= 2012–13 Crewe Alexandra F.C. season =

Crewe Alexandra
2012–13 season
- Chairman: John Bowler
- Manager: Steve Davis
- Stadium: Alexandra Stadium
- League One: 13th
- FA Cup: Second round
- League Cup: Second round
- JP Trophy: Winners
- Highest home attendance: 5,740 vs Tranmere
- Lowest home attendance: 2,501 vs Hartlepool United

This 2012–13 season in League One was Crewe's 89th competitive season in the English Football League and first upon return to League One after an absence spanning over three seasons.

== Season key events ==
- 27 May 2012: Goals from Nick Powell and Byron Moore secure a 2–0 win over Cheltenham Town in the 2011-12 Football League Two play-off final at Wembley.
- 1 June 2012: The club announce that they will be releasing David Artell, Lee Bell, Carl Martin, Danny Shelley, Jordan Brown, Jason Oswell, Caspar Hughes, Michael Koral, Danny Ting and Jordan Connerton.
- 4 June 2012: The club announce that youngster Paris Bateman has signed his first professional contract after graduating from the famed Crewe Academy.
- 6 June 2012: It is announced that Harry Clayton has re-signed on a new one-year deal.
- 8 June 2012: The club announces that Andy White has also re-signed a new one-year deal.
- 13 June 2012: Crewe announce that Nick Powell has signed a four-year contract with Manchester United for £4m.
- 14 June 2012: The club announces the re-signing of Ollie Turton, on a new one-year contract.
- 28 June 2012: Crewe announce the signing of Torquay defender Mark Ellis for an undisclosed fee.
- 3 July 2012: Goalkeeper Steve Phillips re-signs at the club on a new two-year deal, which involves him acting as the academy's goal-keeping coach. Also, the club announces the signing of defender Gregor Robertson on a two-year contract after he was released by Chesterfield at the end of the 2011–12 season.
- 6 July 2012: Crewe announce the signing of Mathias Pogba from Conference National side Wrexham.
- 9 July 2012: Goalkeeper Alan Martin re-signs with the club on a new six-month deal.
- 10 July 2012: The signing of Ebbsfleet United winger Michael West is announced for a nominal compensation package.
- 14 July 2012: Crewe announce that striker Byron Moore has re-signed on a two-year deal.
- 16 July 2012: The club announces the re-signing of defender Kelvin Mellor on a new two-year deal.
- 25 July 2012: The club announce the signing of midfielder Abdul Osman on a free transfer and a two-year contract.
- 30 July 2012: The club announces the departure of striker Shaun Miller on a two-year deal to Sheffield United for an undisclosed fee.
- 11 August 2012: The season proper kicks off with a 5 – 0 victory over Hartlepool United in the first round of the Football League Cup.
- 13 August 2012: The re-signing of defender Adam Dugdale on a three-year deal is announced by the club.
- 18 August 2012: The league campaign starts with a loss to Notts County; the club's first loss in twenty competitive matches.
- 21 August 2012: Striker Harry Bunn joins the club from Manchester City on a six-month loan deal. Crewe beat Scunthorpe United 2–1 for their first win of the league campaign.
- 28 August 2012: Crewe are knocked out of the Football League Cup in the second round with a 2 – 0 loss away to West Ham United.
- 31 August 2012: Club captain Ashley Westwood is signed by Aston Villa for an undisclosed fee on a four-year deal.
- 7 September 2012: Midfielder Chuks Aneke becomes Crewe's second loanee of the season signing an initial one-month contract from Arsenal.
- 7 April 2013: Crewe are crowned champions of the Football League Trophy thanks to goals from Luke Murphy and Max Clayton.

== Pre-season ==
14 July 2012	Congleton Town	0–2	Crewe Alexandra	Congleton, Cheshire
13:30 BST		Report	Moore 41'; Pogba 47'	Stadium: Booth Street; Attendance: ?

16 July 2012	Quorn	0–3	Crewe Alexandra	Quorn, Leicestershire
19:30 BST		Report	Daniels; H.Clayton; Pogba	Stadium: Sutton Park; Attendance: ?

16 July 2012	Chasetown	1–7	Crewe Alexandra XI	Chasetown, Staffordshire
19:45 BST	Russell	Report	Hands (o.g.); Miller; Miller; M.Clayton; M.Clayton; Moore (pen.); Grice	Stadium: The Scholars Ground; Attendance: ?

20 July 2012	Leek Town	1–1	Crewe Alexandra	Leek, Staffordshire
19:45 BST	Ruddock 3'	Report	Pogba 88'	Stadium: Harrison Park

21 July 2012	Nantwich Town	0–3	Crewe Alexandra	Nantwich, Cheshire
15:00 BST		Report	Moore 24'; M. Clayton 75'; Leitch-Smith 90'	Stadium: Weaver Stadium; Attendance: 1,257

24 July 2012	Bashley	0–2	Crewe Alexandra	Bashley, Hampshire
19:45 BST		Report	Moore 48'; Pogba 64'	Stadium: The Recreation Ground

26 July 2012	Pewsey Vale	0–5	Crewe Alexandra	Pewsey, Wiltshire
19:45 BST		Report	H.Clayton; M. Clayton; Pogba; Pogba; Pogba	Stadium: The Recreation Ground

28 July 2012	Crewe Alexandra	1–1	Bolton Wanderers	Crewe, Cheshire
15:00 BST	Clayton 13'		Petrov 27' (pen.)	Stadium: Alexandra Stadium

1 August 2012	Crewe Alexandra	1–0	Huddersfield Town	Crewe, Cheshire
19:30 BST	Dugdale 17'	Report		Stadium: Alexandra Stadium; Attendance: 1,400

4 August 2012	Tamworth	1–1	Crewe Alexandra	Tamworth, Staffordshire
15:00 BST	Kelly 84'	Report	Pogba 6'	Stadium: The Lamb Ground; Attendance: 475

7 August 2012	Crewe Alexandra	1–0	Barnsley	Crewe, Cheshire
19:30 BST	Dugdale 19'	Report		Stadium: Alexandra Stadium

== Competitions ==
=== League One ===
==== League table ====
Pos	Team	Pld	W	D	L	GF	GA	GD	Pts
11	Tranmere Rovers	46	19	10	17	58	48	+10	67
12	Notts County	46	16	17	13	61	49	+12	65
13	Crewe Alexandra	46	18	10	18	54	62	−8	64
14	Preston North End	46	14	17	15	54	49	+5	59
15	Coventry City	46	18	11	17	66	59	+7	55 (Note: On 28 March Coventry City were deducted ten points for entering administration.)

Updated to match(es) played on 27 April 2013. Source: BBC Sport
Rules for classification: 1) Points; 2) Goal difference; 3) Number of goals scored

==== Results ====
18 August 2012	Crewe Alexandra	1–2	Notts County	Crewe, Cheshire
15:00 BST	Pogba 73'	Report	Arquin 40'; Zoko 58'	Stadium: Alexandra Stadium; Attendance: 5,718

21 August 2012	Scunthorpe United	1–2	Crewe Alexandra	Scunthorpe, Lincolnshire
19:45 BST	Grella 15'	Report	Leitch-Smith 1'; Murphy 73'	Stadium: Glanford Park; Attendance: 3,215

25 August 2012	Brentford	5–1	Crewe Alexandra	London
15:00 BST	Donaldson 13', 89'; El Alagui 20', 45'; Dean 84'	Report	Pogba 48'	Stadium: Griffin Park; Attendance: 4,858

1 September 2012	Crewe Alexandra	1–0	Coventry City	Crewe, Cheshire
15:00 BST	Clayton 24'	Report		Stadium: Alexandra Stadium; Attendance: 5,738

8 September 2012	Crewe Alexandra	0–0	Tranmere	Crewe, Cheshire
15:00 BST		Report		Stadium: Alexandra Stadium; Attendance: 5,740

15 September 2012	Stevenage	2–2	Crewe Alexandra	Stevenage, Hertfordshire
15:00 BST	Freeman 27'; Shroot 81'	Report	Leitch-Smith 6', 8'; Aneke (red card) 73'	Stadium: Broadhall Way; Attendance: 2,826

18 September 2012	Carlisle United	0–0	Crewe Alexandra	Carlisle, Cumbria
19:45 BST		Report		Stadium: Brunton Park; Attendance: 3,519

22 September 2012	Crewe Alexandra	1–1	Leyton Orient	Crewe, Cheshire
15:00 BST	Tootle 2'	Report	Rowlands 19'; (yellow card) 53' (yellow-red card) 90' Griffith	Stadium: Gresty Road; Attendance: 5,183

29 September 2012	MK Dons	1–0	Crewe Alexandra	Milton Keynes, Buckinghamshire
15:00 BST	8' MacDonald			Stadium: stadium:mk Attendance: 11,037

2 October 2012	Crewe Alexandra	0–2	Oldham Athletic	Crewe, Cheshire
19:45 BST	61' Tarkowski; 79' Derbyshire			Stadium: Gresty Road; Attendance: 3,935

7 October 2012	Crewe Alexandra	2–1	Hartlepool United	Crewe, Cheshire
15:00 BST	45' Aneke; 70' Ellis; (penalty missed) Pogba		9' Horwood	Stadium: Gresty Road; Attendance: 4,375

13 October 2012	Portsmouth	2–0	Crewe Alexandra	Portsmouth, Hampshire
15:00 BST				Stadium: Fratton Park

20 October 2012	Walsall	2–2	Crewe Alexandra	Walsall, West Midlands
15:00 BST	12' Paterson; 26' Cuvelier		44' Ellis; 90' Aneke	Stadium: Bescot Stadium; Attendance: 3,836

23 October 2012	Crewe Alexandra	2–1	Swindon Town	Crewe, Cheshire
19:45 GMT	29', 41' Moore		25' De Vita	Stadium: Alexandra Stadium; Attendance: 4,010

27 October 2012	Crewe Alexandra	0–1	Yeovil Town	Crewe, Cheshire
15:00 GMT			40' Webster	Stadium: Alexandra Stadium; Attendance: 4,176

6 November 2012	Doncaster Rovers	0–2	Crewe Alexandra	Doncaster, South Yorkshire
19:45 GMT			5' Dalla Valle; 71' Pobga	Stadium: Keepmoat Stadium; Attendance: 5,411

10 November 2012	Crewe Alexandra	3–2	Colchester United	Crewe, Cheshire
15:00 GMT	51' Dalla Valle; 64' (pen.) Murphy; 74' Pogba		3' Sears; 30' Henderson	Stadium: Alexandra Stadium; Attendance: 4,292

17 November 2012	Shrewsbury Town	1–0	Crewe Alexandra	Shrewsbury, Shropshire
15:00 GMT	43' Summerfield			Stadium: New Meadow; Attendance: 6,169

20 November 2012	Sheffield United	3–3	Crewe Alexandra	Sheffield, South Yorkshire
19:30 GMT	4' Miller; 30' Maguire; 51' Blackman		42' Ellis; 45' Pogba; 47' Aneke	Stadium: Brammall Lane; Attendance: 16,000

24 November 2012	Crewe Alexandra	2–0	Crawley Town	Crewe, Cheshire
15:00 GMT	62', 65' Dalla Valle			Stadium: Alexandra Stadium; Attendance: 5,236

8 December 2012	Preston North End	1–3	Crewe Alexandra	Crewe, Cheshire
15:00 GMT	32' Murphy; 49' Inman; 52' Pogba			Stadium: Alexandra Stadium; Attendance: 8,542

15 December 2012	Crewe Alexandra	1–0	Bury	Crewe, Cheshire
15:00 GMT	Inman; 88'			Stadium: Alexandra Stadium; Attendance: 4,648

26 December 2012	Tranmere Rovers	2–1	Crewe Alexandra	Birkenhead, Wirral
15:00 GMT	58' McGurk; 63' Power		12' Inman	Stadium: Prenton Park; Attendance: 7,252

29 December 2012	Oldham Athletic	1–2	Crewe Alexandra	Oldham, Greater Manchester
15:00 GMT	82' Taylor		61' Pogba; 84' Ellis	Stadium: Boundary Park; Attendance: 3,451

1 January 2013	Crewe Alexandra	1–0	Carlisle United	Crewe, Cheshire
15:00 GMT	43' Dalla Valle			Stadium: Alexandra Stadium; Attendance: 4,802

5 January 2013	Crewe Alexandra	1–2	Stevenage	Crewe, Cheshire
15:00 GMT	32' Aneke		55' Akins; 60' Haber	Stadium: Alexandra Stadium; Attendance: 4,262

12 January 2013	Leyton Orient	1–1	Crewe Alexandra	Leyton, London
15:00 GMT	26' Cook		39' Moore	Stadium: Brisbane Road; Attendance: 3,755

26 January 2013	Bournemouth	3–1	Crewe Alexandra	Bournemouth, Dorset
15:00 GMT	8' (pen.), 67', 82' (pen.) Pitman		76' Colclough	Stadium: Dean Court; Attendance: 8,628

2 February 2013	Crewe Alexandra	1–0	Scunthorpe United	Crewe
15:00 GMT	75' Leitch-Smith		4,302	Stadium: Gresty Road; Attendance: 8,628

9 February 2013	Notts County	1–1	Crewe Alexandra	Nottingham
15:00 GMT	Cofie 57'	Report	Murphy	Stadium: Meadow Lane; Attendance: 5,450; Referee: Andy Woolmer

12 February 2013	Crewe Alexandra	1–2	Bournemouth	Crewe
19:45 GMT	Pogba 79'		59' (pen.), 84' Pitman	Stadium: Alexandra Stadium; Attendance: 4,005; Referee: Clark

23 February 2013	Coventry City	1–2	Crewe Alexandra	Coventry
15:00 GMT	L.Clarke 12'		16' Ellis; 78' Clayton	Stadium: Ricoh Arena; Attendance: 10,139

26 February 2013	Hartlepool United	3–0	Crewe Alexandra	Hartlepool
19:45 GMT	Wyke 27'; Franks 40'; Monkhouse 90+2'			Stadium: Victoria Park; Attendance: 3,509

2 March 2013	Crewe Alexandra	1–2	Portsmouth	Crewe
15:00 GMT				Stadium: Gresty Road; Attendance: 5,120

9 March 2013	Colchester United	1–2	Crewe Alexandra	Colchester
15:00 GMT				Stadium: Colchester Community Stadium; Attendance: 3,085

16 March 2013	Crewe Alexandra	1–1	Shrewsbury Town	Crewe
15:00 GMT				Stadium: Gresty Road; Attendance: 5,106

19 March 2013	Crewe Alexandra	2–1	Milton Keynes Dons	Crewe
19:45 GMT				Stadium: Gresty Road; Attendance: 3,770

26 March 2013	Crawley Town	2–0	Crewe Alexandra	Crawley
19:45 GMT				Stadium: Broadfield Stadium; Attendance: 2,544

29 March 2013	Bury	2–2	Crewe Alexandra	Coventry
15:00 GMT				Stadium: Ricoh Arena; Attendance: 2,749

1 April 2013	Crewe Alexandra	1–0	Preston North End	Crewe
15:00 GMT				Stadium: Gresty Road; Attendance: 6,366

10 April 2013	Crewe Alexandra	0–2	Brentford	Crewe
19:45 GMT				Stadium: Gresty Road; Attendance: 4,594

13 April 2013	Crewe Alexandra	1–2	Doncaster	Crewe
15:00 GMT				Stadium: Gresty Road; Attendance: 5,465

16 April 2013	Swindon Town	4–1	Crewe Alexandra	Swindon
15:00 GMT				Stadium: County Ground; Attendance: 7,169

20 April 2013	Yeovil Town	1–0	Crewe Alexandra	Yeovil
15:00 GMT				Stadium: Huish Park; Attendance: 5,293

23 April 2013	Crewe Alexandra	1–0	Sheffield United	Crewe
19:45 GMT				Stadium: Gresty Road; Attendance: 5,379

27 April 2013	Crewe Alexandra	2–0	Walsall	Crewe
15:00 GMT				Stadium: Gresty Road; Attendance: 6,547

=== FA Cup ===
3 November 2012 Round 1	Crewe Alexandra	4–1	Wycombe Wanderers	Crewe, Cheshire
15:00 GMT	19' Pogba; 40' Ellis; 62' Aneke; 77' Murphy		13' Spring	Stadium: Alexandra Stadium; Attendance: 2,417

1 December 2012 Round 2	Crewe Alexandra	0–1	Burton Albion	Crewe, Cheshire
15:00 GMT			5' Zola	Stadium: Alexandra Stadium; Attendance: 3,065

=== League Cup ===
11 August 2012 Round 1	Crewe Alexandra	5–0	Hartlepool United	Crewe, Cheshire
15:00 BST	Leitch-Smith 7'; Clayton 13', 39'; Pogba 34', 90+1'	Report		Stadium: Alexandra Stadium; Attendance: 2,501

28 August 2012 Round 2	West Ham United	2–0	Crewe Alexandra	London
19:45 BST	Maynard 34'; Maiga 54'	Report		Stadium: Upton Park; Attendance: 18,053

=== Football League Trophy ===
9 August 2012 Second round	Shrewsbury Town	1–2	Crewe Alexandra	Shrewsbury, Shropshire
19:15 BST	61' Hall		9' Murphy; 57' Clayton	Stadium: New Meadow; Attendance: 2,063

4 December 2012 Area quarter-final	Crewe Alexandra	1–1 (5–3 p)	Doncaster Rovers	Crewe, Cheshire
19:30 GMT	45' Pogba		90' Brown	Stadium: Alexandra Stadium; Attendance: 1,892; Referee: Trevor Kettle
	Penalties
	Valle (penalty scored); Davis (penalty scored); Osman (penalty scored); Moore (penalty scored); Robertson (penalty scored)		(penalty scored) Brown; (penalty scored) Hume; (penalty missed) Blake; (penalty scored) Quinn

4 December 2012 Area semi-final	Crewe Alexandra	4–1	Bradford City	Crewe, Cheshire
19:30 GMT	44' (o.g.) Doyle; 77' Clayton; 89' Inman; 90' Aneke		18' Reid	Stadium: Alexandra Stadium; Attendance: 2,935; Referee: Nigel Miller

5 February 2013 Area final first leg	Coventry City	0–3	Crewe Alexandra	Coventry
19:45		Report	Inman 52', 78'; Leitch-Smith 85'	Stadium: Ricoh Arena; Attendance: 31,054; Referee: Graham Salisbury

20 February 2013 Area final second leg	Crewe Alexandra	0–2	Coventry City	Crewe
19:30		Report	Ellis 90+3' (o.g.); L. Clarke 90+4'	Stadium: Alexandra Stadium; Attendance: 8,325; Referee: Graham Scott

7 April 2013 Final	Crewe Alexandra	2–0	Southend United	London
13:15 BST	Murphy 6'; Clayton 49'	Report		Stadium: Wembley Stadium; Attendance: 43,842; Referee: Nigel Miller (Durham County)

== Appearances and goals ==
Numbers in parentheses denote appearances as substitute.
Players with names struck through and marked † left the club during the playing season.
Players with names in italics and marked * were on loan from another club for the whole of their season with Crewe.
Key to positions: GK – Goalkeeper; DF – Defender; MF – Midfielder; FW – Forward

Players included in matchday squads
No.	Pos.	Nat.	Name	League One		FA Cup		League Cup		FL Trophy		Total	
No.	Pos.	Nat.	Name	Apps	Goals	Apps	Goals	Apps	Goals	Apps	Goals	Apps	Goals
1	GK	ENG	Steve Phillips	20	0	0	0	0	0	4 (1)	0	24 (1)	0
2	DF	ENG	Matt Tootle	30 (7)	1	2	0	0	0	5	0	37 (7)	1
3	DF	ENG	Harry Davis	42	1	2	0	2	0	4	0	48	1
4	MF	ENG	~~Ashley Westwood~~ †	3	0	0	0	2	0	0	0	5	0
5	DF	ENG	Mark Ellis	43 (1)	5	2	1	2	0	4	0	51 (1)	6
6	DF	ENG	Adam Dugdale	14 (4)	0	0	0	1 (1)	0	4	0	19 (5)	0
7	FW	ENG	Max Clayton	22 (13)	4	0 (1)	0	2	2	3 (1)	3	27 (15)	9
8	MF	ENG	Luke Murphy	38 (1)	6	2	1	1 (1)	0	5	2	46 (2)	9
9	FW	FRA	Mathias Pogba	31 (3)	12	2	1	1	2	4	1	38 (3)	16
10	FW	ENG	AJ Leitch-Smith	25 (3)	4	0	0	2	1	4 (1)	1	31 (4)	6
11	FW	ENG	Byron Moore	35 (6)	4	2	0	2	0	3 (2)	0	42 (8)	4
12	DF	ENG	Oliver Turton	7 (13)	0	0 (1)	0	0 (2)	0	0 (1)	0	7 (17)	0
13	GK	SCO	Alan Martin	25 (1)	0	2	0	2	0	2	0	31 (1)	0
14	DF	ENG	Kelvin Mellor	33 (2)	0	1	0	1	0	5	0	40 (2)	0
15	DF	SCO	Gregor Robertson	25 (4)	0	1 (1)	0	2	0	2 (1)	0	30 (6)	0
16	DF	ENG	Jon Guthrie	1 (1)	0	0	0	0	0	0	0	1 (1)	0
17	DF	ENG	George Ray	2 (2)	0	0	0	0	0	0 (1)	0	2 (3)	0
18	FW	ENG	Brendon Daniels	2 (5)	0	0 (1)	0	0 (1)	0	0 (1)	0	2 (8)	0
19	MF	ENG	Abdul Osman	37 (1)	0	2	0	1 (1)	0	5	0	45 (2)	0
20	DF	ENG	Andy White	0	0	0	0	0	0	0	0	0	0
21	GK	ENG	Ben Garratt	1	0	0	0	0	0	0	0	1	0
22	FW	ENG	Harry Clayton	0	0	0	0	0	0	0	0	0	0
23	MF	ENG	Michael West	5 (3)	0	1	0	0	0	0	0	6 (3)	0
25	FW	ENG	~~Harry Bunn~~ *†	2 (2)	0	0	0	1	0	0	0	3 (2)	0
26	MF	ENG	Chuks Aneke *	21 (9)	6	2	1	0	0	5 (1)	1	28 (10)	8
27	FW	ENG	Ryan Colclough	5 (13)	1	0 (1)	0	0	0	0 (2)	0	5 (16)	1
28	MF	ENG	~~Andy Bond~~ *†	4	0	0	0	0	0	1	0	5	0
29	MF	ENG	Billy Waters	0	0	0	0	0	0	0	0	0	0
30	FW	FIN	~~Lauri Dalla Valle~~ *†	10	5	1	0	0	0	1	0	12	5
31	MF	AUS	Bradden Inman *	17 (4)	5	0	0	0	0	5	3	22 (4)	8
32	FW	ENG	Nathan Ellington	2 (6)	0	0	0	0	0	0	0	2 (6)	0
33	DF	ENG	Liam Nolan	0	0	0	0	0	0	0	0	0	0
34	DF	ENG	Kevin Stewart *	4	0	0	0	0	0	0	0	4	0

Players not included in matchday squads
No.	Pos.	Nat.	Name
24	DF	ENG	Paris Bateman

== Transfers ==
=== In ===
Date	Pos.	Player	From†	Fee	Ref.
1 July 2012	DF	Mark Ellis (ENG)	Torquay United (ENG)	Undisclosed	
3 July 2012	DF	Gregor Robertson (SCO)	Chesterfield (ENG)	Free	
6 July 2012	FW	Mathias Pogba (FRA)	Wrexham (ENG)	Nominal	
10 July 2012	MF	Michael West (ENG)	Ebbsfleet United (ENG)	Undisclosed	
25 July 2012	MF	Abdul Osman (GHA)	Unattached	Free	
8 March 2013	FW	Nathan Ellington (ENG)	Unattached	Free	

† Brackets around club names denote the player's contract with that club had expired before he joined Crewe.

=== Loans in ===
Date	Pos.	Player	From	Duration	Ref.
21 August 2012	FW	Harry Bunn (ENG)	Manchester City (ENG)	Until 6 January	
7 September 2012	MF	Chuks Aneke (ENG)	Arsenal (ENG)	Until 21 January	
5 November 2012	FW	Lauri Dalla Valle (FIN)	Fulham (ENG)	One month	
22 November 2012	MF	Brad Inman (SCO)	Newcastle United (ENG)	Until end of season	
31 January 2013	MF	Chuks Aneke (ENG)	Arsenal (ENG)	Until end of season	
28 March 2013	MF	Kevin Stewart (ENG)	Tottenham Hotspur (ENG)	Until end of season	

=== Out ===
Date	Pos.	Player	To†	Fee	Ref.
1 June 2012	DF	David Artell (ENG)	(Port Vale (ENG))	Released	
1 June 2012	MF	Lee Bell (ENG)	(Burton Albion (ENG))	Released	
1 June 2012	DF	Carl Martin (ENG)	(Macclesfield Town (ENG))	Released	
1 June 2012	MF	Danny Shelley (ENG)	(Leek Town (ENG))	Released	
1 June 2012	DF	Jordan Brown (ENG)	(Barnet (ENG))	Free	
1 June 2012	FW	Jason Oswell (ENG)	(Inverness Caledonian Thistle (SCO))	Free	
1 June 2012	MF	Caspar Hughes (ENG)	(Nantwich Town (ENG))	Free	
1 June 2012	FW	Michael Koral (ENG)	(Congleton Town (ENG))	Free	
1 June 2012	DF	Daniel Ting (ENG)	Unattached	Free	
1 June 2012	FW	Jordan Connerton (ENG)	Lancaster City (ENG)	Free	
1 July 2012	FW	Nick Powell (ENG)	Manchester United (ENG)	Undisclosed (reported as £3m, rising to £6m)	
30 July 2012	FW	Shaun Miller (ENG)	Sheffield United (ENG)	Undisclosed	
31 August 2012	MF	Ashley Westwood (ENG)	Aston Villa (ENG)	Undisclosed	

† Brackets around club names denote the player joined that club after his Crewe contract expired.
