= 2011–12 Crewe Alexandra F.C. season =

Crewe Alexandra F.C.
2011–12 season
- Chairman: John Bowler
- Manager: Dario Gradi (until 10 November 2011); Steve Davis
- League Two: 7th – Play Off Winners
- FA Cup: 1st round
- League Cup: 1st round
- Football League Trophy: Quarter-final (North)
- Top goalscorer: League: Nick Powell (13); All: Nick Powell (15)
- Highest home attendance: League: 6,919 vs Aldershot Town (5 May 2012); All: 7,221 vs Southend United (12 May 2012)
- Lowest home attendance: League: 3,142 vs Barnet (10 September 2011); All: 2,271 vs Macclesfield Town (5 October 2011)
- Average home league attendance: 4,124
| Home colours | Away colours |

This article details Crewe Alexandra's 2011–12 season in League Two. This will be Crewe's 88th competitive season in the English Football League and third successive in League Two.

== Players ==
=== Squad information ===
| N | Pos. | Nat. | Name | Age | Since | App | Goals | Ends | Transfer fee | Notes |
|---|---|---|---|---|---|---|---|---|---|---|
| 1 | GK | (England) | Phillips | 48 | 2010 | 32 | 0 | 30 Jun 2012 | Free | |
| 2 | DF | (England) | Tootle | 36 | 2009 | 71 | 1 | 30 Jun 2014 | Youth system | |
| 3 | DF | (England) | Davis | 35 | 2009 | 1 | 0 | 30 Jun 2012 | Youth system | |
| 4 | DF | (England) | Westwood | 36 | 2008 | 90 | 12 | 30 Jun 2014 | Youth system | |
| 5 | DF | (Gibraltar) | Artell | 45 | 2010 | 43 | 5 | 30 Jun 2012 | Free | |
| 6 | DF | (England) | Dugdale | 39 | 2010 | 20 | 0 | 30 Jun 2012 | Free | |
| 7 | MF | (England) | Bell | 43 | 2010 | 49 | 2 | 30 Jun 2012 | Free | |
| 8 | MF | (England) | Murphy | 37 | 2008 | 89 | 8 | 30 Jun 2013 | Youth system | |
| 9 | FW | (England) | Miller | 39 | 2006 | 141 | 36 | 30 Jun 2013 | Youth system | |
| 10 | FW | (England) | Leitch-Smith | 36 | 2008 | 19 | 5 | 30 Jun 2012 | Youth system | |
| 11 | FW | (England) | Moore | 38 | 2007 | 154 | 15 | 30 Jun 2012 | Youth system | |
| 12 | DF | (England) | Shelley | 36 | 2008 | 49 | 6 | 30 Jun 2012 | Youth system | |
| 13 | GK | (Scotland) | A Martin | 37 | 2011 | 0 | 0 | 30 Jun 2012 | Free | |
| 14 | MF | (England) | Sarcevic | 34 | 2010 | 5 | 1 | 30 Jun 2012 | Undisclosed | |
| 15 | DF | (England) | C Martin | 40 | 2009 | 6 | 1 | 30 Jun 2012 | Undisclosed | |
| 16 | FW | (England) | Connerton | 37 | 2009 | 2 | 0 | 30 Jun 2012 | Undisclosed | |
| 17 | MF | (England) | Mellor | 35 | 2009 | 1 | 0 | | Youth system | |
| 18 | GK | (England) | Garratt | 32 | 2011 | 0 | 0 | 30 Jun 2013 | Youth system | |
| 19 | MF | (England) | Clayton | 32 | 2011 | 2 | 0 | 30 Jun 2014 | Youth system | |
| 20 | MF | (England) | Turton | 33 | 2011 | 1 | 0 | 30 Jun 2012 | Youth system | |
| 21 | DF | (England) | White | 34 | 2011 | 0 | 0 | 30 Jun 2012 | Youth system | |
| 22 | DF | (England) | Ray | 33 | 2011 | 0 | 0 | 30 Jun 2012 | Youth system | |
| 23 | FW | (England) | Daniels | 33 | 2011 | 0 | 0 | 30 Jun 2012 | Youth system | |
| 24 | MF | (England) | Hughes | 34 | 2011 | 1 | 0 | 30 Jun 2012 | Youth system | |
| 25 | FW | (England) | Powell | 32 | 2010 | 19 | 0 | 30 Jun 2014 | Youth system | |
| | FW | (England) | Koral | 34 | 2011 | 0 | 0 | 30 Jun 2012 | Youth system | |
| | FW | (England) | Oswell | 34 | 2011 | 0 | 0 | 30 Jun 2012 | Youth system | |
| | DF | (England) | Ting | 33 | 2011 | 0 | 0 | 30 Jun 2012 | Youth system | |

- Last updated: 25 July 2011
- Source: Wikipedia players' articles, Crewe Alexandra, soccerbase
- Ordered by Squad numbers.

Appearances (starts and substitute appearances) and goals include those in the League (and playoffs), FA Cup, League Cup and Football League Trophy.

=== Squad stats ===
==== Appearances and goals ====
| No. | Pos | Nat | Player | Total | | League Two | | FA Cup | | League Cup | | FL Trophy | |
| No. | Pos | Nat | Player | Apps | Goals | Apps | Goals | Apps | Goals | Apps | Goals | Apps | Goals |
|---|---|---|---|---|---|---|---|---|---|---|---|---|---|
| 1 | GK | (England) ENG | Steve Phillips | 54 | 0 | 49+0 | 0 | 1+0 | 0 | 1+0 | 0 | 3+0 | 0 |
| 2 | DF | (England) ENG | Matthew Tootle | 44 | 0 | 39+1 | 0 | 1+0 | 0 | 1+0 | 0 | 2+0 | 0 |
| 3 | DF | (England) ENG | Harry Davis | 47 | 5 | 42+2 | 5 | 0+0 | 0 | 1+0 | 0 | 2+0 | 0 |
| 4 | MF | (England) ENG | Ashley Westwood | 47 | 3 | 42+2 | 3 | 1+0 | 0 | 0+0 | 0 | 2+0 | 0 |
| 5 | DF | (Gibraltar) GIB | David Artell | 38 | 3 | 33+1 | 2 | 1+0 | 0 | 1+0 | 1 | 2+0 | 0 |
| 6 | DF | (England) ENG | Adam Dugdale | 51 | 3 | 46+0 | 3 | 1+0 | 0 | 1+0 | 0 | 3+0 | 0 |
| 7 | MF | (England) ENG | Lee Bell | 36 | 0 | 23+10 | 0 | 1+0 | 0 | 1+0 | 0 | 1+0 | 0 |
| 8 | MF | (England) ENG | Luke Murphy | 49 | 7 | 41+3 | 7 | 1+0 | 0 | 1+0 | 0 | 3+0 | 0 |
| 9 | FW | (England) ENG | Shaun Miller | 36 | 5 | 26+7 | 4 | 0+0 | 0 | 1+0 | 1 | 2+0 | 0 |
| 10 | FW | (England) ENG | A-Jay Leitch-Smith | 44 | 10 | 34+7 | 10 | 1+0 | 0 | 1+0 | 0 | 0+1 | 0 |
| 11 | FW | (England) ENG | Byron Moore | 49 | 11 | 45+0 | 10 | 1+0 | 1 | 1+0 | 0 | 2+0 | 0 |
| 12 | MF | (England) ENG | Danny Shelley | 29 | 1 | 12+14 | 1 | 0+0 | 0 | 0+1 | 0 | 1+1 | 0 |
| 14 | MF | (England) ENG | Antoni Sarcevic | 10 | 0 | 1+5 | 0 | 0+1 | 0 | 0+0 | 0 | 3+0 | 0 |
| 15 | DF | (England) ENG | Carl Martin | 34 | 0 | 27+4 | 0 | 1+0 | 0 | 0+0 | 0 | 1+1 | 0 |
| 17 | DF | (England) ENG | Kelvin Mellor | 17 | 1 | 9+6 | 1 | 0+1 | 0 | 0+0 | 0 | 0+1 | 0 |
| 19 | FW | (England) ENG | Max Clayton | 30 | 5 | 1+26 | 4 | 0+0 | 0 | 0+0 | 0 | 1+2 | 1 |
| 20 | DF | (England) ENG | Ollie Turton | 3 | 0 | 0+2 | 0 | 0+0 | 0 | 0+0 | 0 | 1+0 | 0 |
| 24 | MF | (England) ENG | Caspar Hughes | 7 | 0 | 0+4 | 0 | 0+1 | 0 | 0+0 | 0 | 2+0 | 0 |
| 25 | MF | (England) ENG | Nick Powell | 45 | 15 | 37+4 | 14 | 1+0 | 0 | 1+0 | 0 | 2+0 | 1 |
| 33 | DF | (England) ENG | Jordan Brown | 7 | 0 | 2+5 | 0 | 0+0 | 0 | 0+0 | 0 | 0+0 | 0 |
Players on loan to Crewe who returned to their parent club:
| 27 | FW | (England) ENG | Wes Fletcher | 6 | 1 | 3+3 | 1 | 0+0 | 0 | 0+0 | 0 | 0+0 | 0 |
| 28 | MF | (England) ENG | Jamie Lowry | 10 | 0 | 9+1 | 0 | 0+0 | 0 | 0+0 | 0 | 0+0 | 0 |
| 30 | FW | (England) ENG | Greg Pearson | 9 | 3 | 8+1 | 3 | 0+0 | 0 | 0+0 | 0 | 0+0 | 0 |
| 31 | DF | (England) ENG | James Tunnicliffe | 2 | 0 | 2+0 | 0 | 0+0 | 0 | 0+0 | 0 | 0+0 | 0 |
| 34 | FW | (Wales) WAL | Billy Bodin | 9 | 0 | 8+1 | 0 | 0+0 | 0 | 0+0 | 0 | 0+0 | 0 |

==== Top scorers ====
| Place | Position | Nation | Number | Name | League Two^{1} | FA Cup | League Cup | FL Trophy | Total |
|---|---|---|---|---|---|---|---|---|---|
| 1 | MF | (England) | 25 | Nick Powell | 15 | 0 | 0 | 1 | 16 |
| 2 | FW | (England) | 11 | Byron Moore | 9 | 1 | 0 | 0 | 11 |
| 3 | FW | (England) | 10 | A-Jay Leitch-Smith | 9 | 0 | 0 | 0 | 9 |
| 4 | MF | (England) | 8 | Luke Murphy | 8 | 0 | 0 | 0 | 8 |
| 5 | FW | (England) | 9 | Shaun Miller | 5 | 0 | 1 | 0 | 6 |
| | | | | TOTALS | 46 | 1 | 1 | 1 | 50 |

^{1}Includes 2012 Football League play-offs.

==== Disciplinary record ====
| Number | Nation | Position | Name | League Two | | FA Cup | | League Cup | | FL Trophy | | Total | |
| Number | Nation | Position | Name | Yellow card | Red card | Yellow card | Red card | Yellow card | Red card | Yellow card | Red card | Yellow card | Red card |
| 7 | (England) | MF | Lee Bell | 2 | 0 | 0 | 0 | 0 | 0 | 0 | 0 | 2 | 0 |
| 5 | (Gibraltar) | DF | David Artell | 1 | 0 | 0 | 0 | 0 | 0 | 0 | 0 | 1 | 0 |
| 3 | (England) | DF | Harry Davis | 1 | 0 | 0 | 0 | 0 | 0 | 0 | 0 | 1 | 0 |
| 6 | (England) | DF | Adam Dugdale | 1 | 0 | 0 | 0 | 0 | 0 | 0 | 0 | 1 | 0 |
| 9 | (England) | FW | Shaun Miller | 0 | 0 | 0 | 0 | 1 | 0 | 0 | 0 | 1 | 0 |
| 12 | (England) | MF | Danny Shelley | 1 | 0 | 0 | 0 | 0 | 0 | 0 | 0 | 1 | 0 |
| | | | TOTALS | 6 | 0 | 0 | 0 | 1 | 0 | 0 | 0 | 7 | 0 |

=== Transfers ===
==== Transfers in ====
| Date | Pos. | Nat. | Player | From† | Fee | Ref. |
|---|---|---|---|---|---|---|
| 25 July 2011 | GK | SCO | Alan Martin | (Ayr United) | Free transfer | |
| 27 February 2012 | DF | ENG | Jordan Brown | | Free transfer | |

† Brackets around club names denote the player's contract with that club had expired before he joined Crewe.

==== Loans in ====
| Date | Pos. | Nat. | Player | From | Duration | Ref. |
|---|---|---|---|---|---|---|
| 25 November 2011 | FW | ENG | Wes Fletcher | Burnley | Until 5 January 2012 | |
| 25 November 2011 | MF | ENG | Jamie Lowry | Chesterfield | Until 9 January 2012 | |
| 13 January 2012 | FW | ENG | Greg Pearson | Burton Albion | One month | |
| 9 February 2012 | DF | ENG | James Tunnicliffe | Wycombe Wanderers | One month | |
| 22 March 2012 | FW | WAL | Billy Bodin | Swindon Town | Until end of season | |

==== Transfers out ====
| Date | Pos. | Nat. | Player | To† | Fee | Ref. |
|---|---|---|---|---|---|---|
| 30 June 2011 | DF | CMR | Patrick Ada | (Kilmarnock) | Released | |
| 30 June 2011 | DF | ENG | Mat Mitchel-King | (AFC Wimbledon) | Released | |
| 30 June 2011 | FW | DRC | Calvin Zola | (Burton Albion) | Released | |
| 30 June 2011 | MF | JAM | Joel Grant | (Wycombe Wanderers) | Released | |
| 30 June 2011 | DF | ENG | Danny Blanchett | (Burton Albion) | Released | |
| 30 June 2011 | MF | ENG | Lewis Short | | Released | |
| 30 June 2011 | DF | ENG | Ashley M. Westwood | | Released | |
| 30 June 2011 | GK | POL | Bartlek Fogler | | Released | |
| 1 July 2011 | FW | JAM | Clayton Donaldson | (Brentford) | Free transfer | |
| November 2011 | MF | ENG | Antoni Sarcevic | (Chester) | Contract terminated | |

† Brackets around club names denote the player joined that club after his Morecambe contract expired.

==== Loans out ====
| Date | Pos. | Nat. | Player | To | Duration | Ref. |
|---|---|---|---|---|---|---|
| 6 January 2012 | MF | ENG | Caspar Hughes | Chasetown | One month | |
| 2 March 2012 | MF | ENG | Caspar Hughes | Nantwich Town | One month | |
| 22 March 2012 | FW | ENG | Jordan Connerton | Workington | Until end of season | |

== Club ==
=== Coaching staff ===
| Position | Staff |
|---|---|
| First Team Manager | Dario Gradi MBE |
| Assistant Manager | Steve Davis |
| Assistant Manager (Player Recruitment) | Neil Baker |
| Assistant Academy Manager | James Collins |
| Assistant Academy Manager | Neil Critchley |
| Head physiotherapist | Rob Sharp |
| Physiotherapist | Nick Oakley |
| Fitness Coach | Andy Franks |
| Academy Recruitment Officer | Phil Swift |
| Academy Operations Manager | Paul Anthrobus |

Last updated: 21 May 2011
Source: Crewe Alexandra Staff

=== Other information ===
| Chairman | John Bowler |
| Vice Chairman | David Rowlinson |
| Director | Richard Clayton |
| Director | Dario Gradi MBE |
| Director | Mark Hassall |
| Director | Jim McMillan |
| Director | Daniel Potts |
| Director | Norman Hassall |
| Director | Jimmy Rowlinson |
| Head Groundsman | John Huxley |
| Assistant Groundsman | Andrew Wareham |
| Club Doctor | Dr Mike Freeman |
| Club Masseur | Roy Ambrose |
| Club Chaplain | Steve Clapham |
| Ground (capacity and dimensions) | Alexandra Stadium (10,153 / 100 × 66 yd) |

Updated to match played 21 May 2011
Source: Crewe Alexandra Staff

=== Kits ===
| Home; Supplier: Carbrini; Sponsors: Mornflake Oats | Away; Supplier: Carbrini; Sponsors: Mornflake Oats | Home goalkeepers Supplier: Carbrini; Sponsors: Mornflake Oats | Away goalkeepers Supplier: Carbrini; Sponsors: Mornflake Oats |

== Competitions ==
=== Overall ===
| Competition | Started round | Current position / round | Final position / round | First match | Last match |
|---|---|---|---|---|---|
| Football League Two | — | 10 | 7 | 6 August 2011 | 5 May 2012 |
| Football League Cup | 1st round | 1st round | | 9 August 2011 | |
| Football League Trophy | 1st round | Area Quarter Finals | | w/c 29 August 2011 | |
| FA Cup | 1st round | 1st round | | November 2011 | |

Updated to match played 1 July 2011
Source: Competitions

=== League Two ===
==== Table ====
| Pos | Team | Pld | W | D | L | GF | GA | GD | Pts | Promotion, qualification or relegation |
|---|---|---|---|---|---|---|---|---|---|---|
| 5 | Torquay United | 46 | 23 | 12 | 11 | 63 | 50 | +13 | 81 | Qualification for League Two play-offs (Note: Four teams play for one spot and promotion to Football League One.) |
| 6 | Cheltenham Town | 46 | 23 | 8 | 15 | 66 | 50 | +16 | 77 | Qualification for League Two play-offs |
| 7 | Crewe Alexandra (O, P) | 46 | 20 | 12 | 14 | 67 | 59 | +8 | 72 | Qualification for League Two play-offs |
| 8 | Gillingham | 46 | 20 | 10 | 16 | 79 | 62 | +17 | 70 | |
| 9 | Oxford United | 46 | 17 | 17 | 12 | 59 | 48 | +11 | 68 | |

Updated to match(es) played on 5 May 2012. Source: BBC Sport
Rules for classification: 1) Points; 2) Goal difference; 3) Number of goals scored
(O) Play-off winners; (P) Promoted

==== Results summary ====
| Overall | | | | | | | | Home | | | | | | Away | | | | | |
| Pld | W | D | L | GF | GA | GD | Pts | W | D | L | GF | GA | GD | W | D | L | GF | GA | GD |
|---|---|---|---|---|---|---|---|---|---|---|---|---|---|---|---|---|---|---|---|
| 46 | 20 | 12 | 14 | 67 | 59 | +8 | 72 | 11 | 6 | 6 | 38 | 28 | +10 | 9 | 6 | 8 | 29 | 31 | −2 |

Last updated: 5 May 2012.
Source: https://www.bbc.co.uk/sport/football/tables

==== Results by round ====
| Round | 1 | 2 | 3 | 4 | 5 | 6 | 7 | 8 | 9 | 10 | 11 | 12 | 13 | 14 | 15 | 16 | 17 | 18 | 19 | 20 | 21 | 22 | 23 | 24 | 25 | 26 | 27 | 28 | 29 | 30 | 31 | 32 | 33 | 34 | 35 | 36 | 37 | 38 | 39 | 40 | 41 | 42 | 43 | 44 | 45 | 46 |
|---|---|---|---|---|---|---|---|---|---|---|---|---|---|---|---|---|---|---|---|---|---|---|---|---|---|---|---|---|---|---|---|---|---|---|---|---|---|---|---|---|---|---|---|---|---|---|
| Ground | A | H | H | A | A | H | H | A | A | H | A | H | A | H | A | A | H | A | H | A | H | A | A | H | H | A | H | A | H | A | H | A | H | H | A | A | H | H | A | H | A | H | A | H | A | H |
| Result | L | L | L | L | W | W | W | L | W | D | L | L | W | L | W | L | L | W | W | D | D | L | W | L | W | W | W | L | W | D | W | L | D | D | D | W | W | W | W | D | D | W | D | W | D | D |
| Position | 24 | 23 | 23 | 24 | 22 | 20 | 15 | 20 | 15 | 16 | 19 | 19 | 15 | 16 | 14 | 17 | 18 | 16 | 15 | 16 | 14 | 15 | 15 | 15 | 14 | 13 | 11 | 12 | 12 | 12 | 10 | 9 | 10 | 10 | 10 | 10 | 9 | 8 | 8 | 8 | 8 | 8 | 8 | 7 | 7 | 7 |

Updated to match(es) played on 5 May 2012. Source: Crewe Alexandra
A = Away; H = Home; W = Win; D = Draw; L = Loss

== Matches ==
Won Drawn Lost Postponed

=== Pre-season friendlies ===
| 11 July 2011 | Rhyl | 0–0 | Crewe Alexandra | Belle Vue |
| 19:30 | | Report | | Attendance: 250 |

| 11 July 2011 | Congleton Town | 0–4 | Crewe Alexandra | Congleton |
| 19:30 | | Report | Moore; Moore; Daniels; Trialist (McCammon) | Stadium: Booth Street |

| 16 July 2011 | Crewe Alexandra | 2–1 | Wolverhampton Wanderers | Alexandra Stadium |
| 15:00 | Miller 44'; Sarcevic 85' | Report | Doyle 81' | Attendance: 2,567; Referee: Tony Bates |

| 19 July 2011 | Newcastle Town | 1–3 | Crewe Alexandra | Newcastle-under-Lyme |
| 19:30 | Gartside | Report | Powell; Pires; Sarcevic (pen.) | Stadium: Lyme Valley Stadium |

| 19 July 2011 | Quorn | 1–9 | Crewe Alexandra | Quorn |
| 19:45 | 87' | Report | Miller 5', 20', 38', 51'; Westwood 33'; Shelley 40'; Moore 51'; Oswell | Stadium: Sutton Park |

| 22 July 2011 | Nantwich Town | 1–1 | Crewe Alexandra | Nantwich |
| 19:30 | Nicholls 89' | Report | Daniels 90' | Stadium: The Weaver Stadium; Attendance: 1,084 |

| 26 July 2011 | Crewe Alexandra | 2–1 | Derby County | Alexandra Stadium |
| 19:30 | Moore; Shelley 46' | Report | Riggott 14' | Attendance: 2,063; Referee: Steve Rushton |

| 30 July 2011 | Crewe Alexandra | 2–1 | Rochdale | Alexandra Stadium |
| 15:00 | Miller 2'; Shelley 18' (pen.) | Report | Marshall 78' |

| 1 August 2011 | Wealdstone | 2–3 | Crewe Alexandra | Ruislip, London Borough of Hillingdon |
| 19:30 | | Report | | Stadium: St Georges Stadium |

Last updated: 4 May 2011

=== League Two ===
| 6 August 2011 1 | Swindon Town | 3–0 | Crewe Alexandra | The County Ground |
| 15:00 | Kennedy 45' (pen.); Risser 63'; Flint 77' | Report | | Attendance: 8,248 |

| 13 August 2011 2 | Crewe Alexandra | 1–2 | Gillingham | Alexandra Stadium |
| 15:00 | Miller 74' | | Whelpdale 23'; Spiller 25' | Attendance: 3,401 |

| 16 August 2011 3 | Crewe Alexandra | 1–2 | Rotherham United | Alexandra Stadium |
| 19:45 | Moore 74' | | Le Fondre 15'; Pringle 72' | Attendance: 3,458 |

| 20 August 2011 4 | Shrewsbury Town | 2–0 | Crewe Alexandra | Greenhous Meadow |
| 15:00 | McAllister 23'; Wroe 90+1' | | | Attendance: 5,050 |

| 27 August 2011 5 | Plymouth Argyle | 0–1 | Crewe Alexandra | Home Park |
| 15:00 | | | Miller 42' | Attendance: 5,720 |

| 3 September 2011 6 | Crewe Alexandra | 3–1 | Oxford United | Alexandra Stadium |
| 15:00 | Miller 30', 37'; Leitch-Smith 65' | | Davis 77' | Attendance: 3,680 |

| 10 September 2011 7 | Crewe Alexandra | 3–1 | Barnet | Alexandra Stadium |
| 15:00 | Murphy 27'; Miller 55'; Dugdale 90+1' | | McLeod 81' | Attendance: 3,142 |

| 13 September 2011 8 | Burton Albion | 1–0 | Crewe Alexandra | Pirelli Stadium |
| 19:45 | Richards 34' | | | Attendance: 2,246 |

| 17 September 2011 9 | Accrington Stanley | 0–2 | Crewe Alexandra | Crown Ground |
| 15:00 | | | Leitch-Smith 11'; Moore 14' | Attendance: 1,503 |

| 24 September 2011 10 | Crewe Alexandra | 1–1 | Port Vale | Alexandra Stadium |
| 15:00 | Moore 72' | | Pope 74' | Attendance: 6,613 |

| 1 October 2011 11 | Dagenham & Redbridge | 2–1 | Crewe Alexandra | Victoria Road |
| 15:00 | Williams 76'; Rose 90+5' | | Moore 75' | Attendance: 1,725 |

| 8 October 2011 12 | Crewe Alexandra | 1–3 | Southend United | Alexandra Stadium |
| 15:00 | Davis 75' | | Ferdinand 37'; Mohsni 88' 90+1' | Attendance: 3,808 |

| 15 October 2011 13 | AFC Wimbledon | 1–3 | Crewe Alexandra | Kingsmeadow |
| 15:00 | Jolley 60' | | Powell 46' Dugdale 79' Leitch-Smith 88' | Attendance: 4,604 |

| 22 October 2011 14 | Crewe Alexandra | 0–1 | Macclesfield Town | Alexandra Stadium |
| 15:00 | | | Draper 19' | Attendance: 3,877 |

| 25 October 2011 15 | Cheltenham Town F.C. | 0–1 | Crewe Alexandra | Abbey Business Stadium |
| 19:45 | | | Davis 54' (pen.) | Attendance: 3,089 |

| 29 October 2011 16 | Aldershot Town | 3–1 | Crewe Alexandra | Recreation Ground |
| 15:00 | Hylton 23', 62'; McGlashan 48' | | Leitch-Smith 30' | Attendance: 2,552 |

| 5 November 2011 17 | Crewe Alexandra | 0–3 | Torquay United | Alexandra Stadium |
| 15:00 | | | Howe 9'; Mansell 53'; Bodin 68' | Attendance: 3,521 |

| 19 November 2011 18 | Morecambe | 1–2 | Crewe Alexandra | Globe Arena |
| 15:00 | Ellison 69' | | Powell 79'; Clayton 90+5' | Attendance: 2,169 |

| 26 November 2011 19 | Crewe Alexandra | 1–0 | Hereford United | Alexandra Stadium |
| 15:00 | Powell 60' | | | Attendance: 3,591 |

| 10 December 2011 20 | Northampton Town | 1–1 | Crewe Alexandra | Sixfields Stadium |
| 15:00 | Akinfenwa 16' | | Moore 61' | Attendance: 4,579 |

| 17 December 2011 21 | Crewe Alexandra | 1–1 | Crawley Town | Alexandra Stadium |
| 15:00 | Fletcher 9' | | Tubbs 31' | Attendance: 3,635 |

| 26 December 2011 22 | Bradford City | 3–0 | Crewe Alexandra | Valley Parade |
| 15:00 | Wells 2'; Hanson 64', 84' | | | Attendance: 11,060 |

| 31 December 2011 23 | Bristol Rovers | 2–5 | Crewe Alexandra | Memorial Stadium |
| 15:00 | Harrold 9'; Bolger 27' (o.g.); McGleish 48' | | Leitch-Smith 2'; Powell 33'; Artell 44'; Powell 93' | Attendance: 5,037 |

| 2 January 2012 24 | Crewe Alexandra | 0–1 | Morecambe | Alexandra Stadium |
| 15:00 | | | Ellison 28' | Attendance: 3,840 |

| 7 January 2012 24 | Crewe Alexandra | 3–2 | Plymouth Argyle | Alexandra Stadium |
| 15:00 | Murphy 20', 44'; Westwood 53' (pen.) | | Walton 50' (pen.); LeCointe 66' | Attendance: 3.707 |

| 14 January 2012 25 | Oxford United | 0–1 | Crewe Alexandra | Kassam Stadium |
| 15:00 | | | Pearson 89' | Attendance: 7,052 |

| 21 January 2012 26 | Crewe Alexandra | 4–1 | Dagenham & Redbridge | Alexandra Stadium |
| 15:00 | Pearson 41'; Ogogo 71' (o.g.); Dugdale 83'; Powell 86' | | Woodall 17'; Ahmed Abdulla (yellow card) 83' | Attendance: 3,282 |

| 28 January 2012 27 | Barnet | 2–0 | Crewe Alexandra | Underhill Stadium |
| 15:00 | McLeod 30' (pen.); Hector 77' | | Artell (red card) 29'; Dugdale (red card) 44' | Attendance: 2,263 |

| 14 February 2012 28 | Crewe Alexandra | 3–2 | Burton Albion | Alexandra Stadium |
| 19:45 | Shelley 30'; Westwood 55'; Murphy 87'; Martin (yellow card) 90+1' | | McGrath (yellow card) 25'; Driver 57'; Stanton (yellow card) 66'; Zola 90' | Attendance: 3,157 |

| 18 February 2012 29 | Southend United | 1–0 | Crewe Alexandra | Roots Hall |
| 15:00 | Kalala (yellow card) 61'; Mohsni 74' | | Martin (yellow card) 73'; Phillips (yellow card) 79' | Attendance: 5,645 |

| 21 February 2012 30 | Crewe Alexandra | 2–0 | Accrington Stanley | Alexandra Stadium |
| 19:45 | Westwood (yellow card) 20'; Powell (yellow card) 39'; Clayton 81'; Murphy 90+2' | | McIntyre (yellow card) 43' | Attendance: 3,179 |

| 25 February 2012 31 | Crewe Alexandra | 3–3 | AFC Wimbledon | Alexandra Stadium |
| 15:00 | Moore 10'; Powell 11'; Pearson 31'; Bell (yellow card) 90+3' | | Knott 7'; Bush (yellow card) 47'; Moore (yellow card) 52' (goal) 81'; Jolley 90+2' | Attendance: 4,240 |

| 28 February 2012 32 | Port Vale | 1–1 | Crewe Alexandra | Vale Park |
| 19:45 | Artell 49' (o.g.) | | Moore 80'; Bell (yellow card) 86' | Attendance: 6,356 |

| 3 March 2012 33 | Crewe Alexandra | 1–1 | Shrewsbury Town | Alexandra Stadium |
| 15:00 | Martin (yellow card) 15'; Powell 22'; Murphy (yellow card) 33' | | Collins 5'; Richards (yellow card) 54'; McLaughlin (yellow card) 72' | Attendance: 5,086 |

| 6 March 2012 34 | Rotherham United | 1–1 | Crewe Alexandra | Don Valley Stadium |
| 19:45 | Grabban 62'; Wood (yellow card) 72'; Pringle (yellow card) 82' | | Davis 16' (pen.) | Attendance: 2,447 |

| 10 March 2012 35 | Gillingham | 3–4 | Crewe Alexandra | Priestfield Stadium |
| 15:00 | Lee (yellow card) 16'; Jackman (yellow card) 42'; Payne 48' (yellow card) 79'; Whelpdale 67'; Montrose (yellow card) 71'; Miller 73'; Spiller (red card) 80' | | Powell 27', 53'; Leitch-Smith 52'; Davis (yellow card) 76'; Tootle (yellow card) 83'; Clayton 90+5' | Attendance: 5,428 |

| 17 March 2012 36 | Crewe Alexandra | 2–0 | Swindon Town | Alexandra Stadium |
| 15:00 | Powell 29'; Westwood 65' | | McCormack (yellow card) 39'; Flint (yellow card) 69' | Attendance: 4,641 |

| 20 March 2012 37 | Crewe Alexandra | 1–0 | Bradford City | Alexandra Stadium |
| 19:45 | Davis 22' (pen.) | | | Attendance: 3,556 |

| 24 March 2012 38 | Hereford United | 0–1 | Crewe Alexandra | Edgar Street |
| 15:00 | Stam (yellow card) 56' | | Murphy 79' (yellow card) 88' | Attendance: 2,326 |

| 31 March 2012 39 | Crewe Alexandra | 1–1 | Northampton Town | Alexandra Stadium |
| 15:00 | Murphy 17'; Artell (yellow card) 45+1' | | Akinfenwa 59'; Williams (yellow card) 67' | Attendance: 4,893 |

| 6 April 2012 40 | Crawley Town | 1–1 | Crewe Alexandra | Broadfield Stadium |
| 15:00 | Alexander (yellow card) 43' (goal) 88' (pen.) | | Moore 29'; Phillips (yellow card) 87'; Artell (yellow card) 89' | Attendance: 4,723 |

| 9 April 2012 41 | Crewe Alexandra | 3–0 | Bristol Rovers | Alexandra Stadium |
| 15:00 | Leitch-Smith 2'; Mellor 6'; Davis 49' (pen.) | | Lund (yellow card) 18'; Bolger (yellow card) 76' | Attendance: 4,139 |

| 14 April 2012 43 | Macclesfield Town | 2–2 | Crewe Alexandra | Moss Rose |
| 15:00 | Chalmers 17' (pen.) (yellow card) 68'; Hamshaw (yellow card) 64'; Daniel 80'; Tomlinson (yellow card) 90+5' | | Powell 40', 58'; Murphy (yellow card) 69' | Attendance: 3,434 |

| 21 April 2012 44 | Crewe Alexandra | 1–0 | Cheltenham Town | Alexandra Stadium |
| 15:00 | Artell 44' | | | Attendance: 5,495 |

| 28 April 2012 45 | Torquay United | 1–1 | Crewe Alexandra | Plainmoor |
| 15:00 | Stevens 53'; Ellis (yellow card) 73'; Howe (yellow card) 87'; O'Kane (yellow card) 90+7' | | Davis (yellow card) 17'; Dugdale (yellow card) 70'; Powell 90+4'; Leitch-Smith (yellow card) 90+7' | Attendance: 3,802 |

| 5 May 2012 46 | Crewe Alexandra | 2–2 | Aldershot Town | Alexandra Stadium |
| 15:00 | Leitch-Smith 4'; Davis 31' (o.g.); Murphy 76' | | Molesley 45'; Payne (yellow card) 51' | Attendance: 6,919 |

=== FA Cup ===
| 12 November 2011 First round | Crewe Alexandra | 1–4 | Colchester United | Alexandra Stadium |
| 15:00 | Moore 19' | | James 60'; Bond 75'; Cocker 87'; James 92' | Attendance: 2,325; Referee: David Coote |

=== Football League Cup ===
| 9 August 2011 First round | Preston North End | 3–2 | Crewe Alexandra | Deepdale |
| 19:45 | Tootle 3' (o.g.); Mellor 84'; Hume 90' | Report | Miller 18'; Artell 40' | Attendance: 5,401; Referee: Webb |

=== Football League Trophy ===
| 30 August 2011 First round | Bury | 0–0 (2–4 p) | Crewe Alexandra | Gigg Lane Stadium |
| | | | | Attendance: 1,295; Referee: Bobby Madley |
| | Penalties |
| | Cregg (penalty missed); Bishop (penalty missed); Worrall (penalty scored); Picken (penalty scored) | | Westwood (penalty scored); Shelley (penalty scored); Davis (penalty scored); Bell (penalty scored) |

| 5 October 2011 Second round | Crewe Alexandra | 1–0 | Macclesfield Town | Alexandra Stadium |
| | Clayton 76'; Powell (yellow card) 87' | | Brown (yellow card) 78' | Attendance: 2,271; Referee: Jock Waugh |

| 8 November 2011 Quarter Final | Oldham Athletic | 3–1 | Crewe Alexandra | Boundary Park |
| | Kuqi 12', 59'; M'voto (yellow card) 23'; Scapuzzi 72' | | Powell 54' | Attendance: 2,163; Referee: Graham Salisbury |
