= Byron Moore =

English footballer (born 1988)

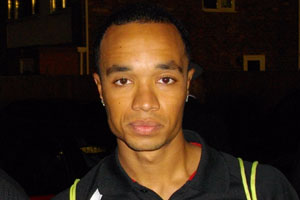
- Moore in 2010

Personal information
- Full name: Byron Curtis Moore
- Date of birth: 24 August 1988 (age 38)
- Place of birth: Stoke-on-Trent, England
- Height: 6 ft 0 in (1.83 m)
- Positions: Winger; forward; wing-back

Team information
- Current team: Nantwich Town

Youth career
- 2004–2007: Crewe Alexandra

Senior career*
Years	Team	Apps	(Gls)
2007–2014	Crewe Alexandra	262	(30)
2007	→ Kidsgrove Athletic (loan)	15	(7)
2014–2016	Port Vale	51	(4)
2016–2018	Bristol Rovers	47	(2)
2018–2019	Bury	36	(5)
2019–2021	Plymouth Argyle	68	(6)
2021–2022	Torquay United	5	(0)
2022–2025	AFC Telford United	109	(10)
2025–	Nantwich Town		
- * Club domestic league appearances and goals as of 18:44, 30 April 2026 (UTC)

Byron Curtis Moore (born 24 August 1988) is an English footballer who plays as a winger or as a forward and has also been utilised as a wing-back. He plays for Northern Premier League Division One West club Nantwich Town.

A graduate of the Crewe Alexandra Academy, he made his senior debut for Crewe Alexandra in August 2007. He went on to spend the next seven years with the club, twice playing at Wembley Stadium as he helped the "Railwaymen" to win promotion out of League Two via the play-offs in 2012 and then to go on and lift the Football League Trophy in 2013. He signed with nearby league rivals Port Vale in July 2014 and switched to Bristol Rovers in June 2016. He joined Bury in June 2018 and helped the club to win promotion out of League Two at the end of the 2018–19 season. He joined Plymouth Argyle in July 2019 and then won his second successive League Two promotion. He joined non-League club Torquay United on a short-term deal in October 2021 and moved on to AFC Telford United in February 2022. He won the Southern League Premier Division Central play-offs with the club in 2025, before moving on to Nantwich Town.

== Career ==
=== Crewe Alexandra ===
Moore began his career at Cheshire club Crewe Alexandra, graduating through the club's Academy to turn professional at Gresty Road after initially being spotted as a 15-year-old playing for Sandon High School and representing Stoke-on-Trent Schoolboys. Before turning professional he spent part of the 2006–07 season on loan at nearby Kidsgrove Athletic, scoring seven goals in 15 Northern Premier League appearances for the "Grove". He made his debut for the "Railwaymen" on 11 August 2007, following a last minute injury to first-team regular Ryan Lowe, and helped the Crewe to a 2–1 home victory over Brighton & Hove Albion. He signed a three-year contract with the club in September 2007. He scored the first goal of his career in a 3–2 defeat to Oldham Athletic at Boundary Park on 29 September; his goal put Crewe 2–0 ahead before Oldham launched a successful comeback. He was named on the League One 'Team of the Week' for his performance in a 2–0 victory over Yeovil Town, a game in which he scored the second goal of his senior career. Manager Steve Holland showed faith in Moore, who ended the 2007–08 season with three goals in 36 appearances.

He scored four goals in 41 games in the 2008–09 season, as the club suffered relegation into League Two under new manager Guðjón Þórðarson, ending four points short of safety. He scored three goals in 35 matches in the 2009–10 campaign and signed a new contract with the "Alex" in December 2009. However, the season ended in a disappointing 18th-place finish, the club finishing 11 points above the English Football League's relegation zone. In the 2010–11 season, Moore was switched to the wings and formed an effective front-three partnership with Clayton Donaldson and Shaun Miller. He finally signed a new one-year contract with Crewe in July 2011, having held out for some months in the hope of attracting interest from bigger clubs. Manager Dario Gradi stated that "I am not surprised that there has been no real interest in them [Moore and Donaldson]".

Moore scored ten goals in 49 appearances in the 2011–12 campaign as he continued to progress under the stewardship of new manager Steve Davis. Two of these goals came in 1–1 draws with local rivals Port Vale, as his strikes won a crucial two points in the club's play-off push. He sealed promotion for Crewe when he scored the second goal in their 2–0 victory over Cheltenham Town to win the League Two play-off final. He signed a new two-year contract with the club in July 2012. Mpore scored four goals in 50 appearances in the 2012–13 season as Crewe ended the season in 13th place, ten points outside of the play-off zone. On 7 April, he provided assists to both Luke Murphy and then Max Clayton as Crewe beat Southend United 2–0 at Wembley to win the Football League Trophy. He scored four goals in 43 appearances in the 2013–14 campaign, his form being described as "hot and cold" as Crewe finished just two places and four points above the relegation zone. In June 2014 Moore confirmed that he would not be signing a new 12-month extension to his contract and would instead seek out a new club.

=== Port Vale ===
Moore signed a two-year contract with League One side Port Vale in July 2014. His arrival at Vale Park increased the local rivalry between Vale and Crewe, especially as the two managers had recently exchanged a war of words via local newspaper The Sentinel following the decision of Steve Davis to criticize Micky Adams for a contract offer he described as "derisory" that Vale offered to his son Joe Davis. He was missing throughout the 2014–15 pre-season as he was on compassionate leave following the death of his brother. He made ten appearances before failing to get a game for three months following 8 November, but then forced himself back into first-team contention after an impressive substitute appearance at Bristol City on 10 February. Eleven days later he scored his first goal for the "Valiants" in a 3–0 win over Doncaster Rovers. He remained in the startling line-up until he picked up a groin strain in March.

On 11 August 2015, he scored the winning goal in a 1–0 victory over Championship club Burnley in the first round of the League Cup. He went on to score five goals in 41 appearances throughout the 2015–16 campaign and was named in the Football League Team of the Week and providing an assist for A-Jay Leitch-Smith in a 1–0 win at Blackpool on 9 January. He then departed on a free transfer after rejecting the club's offer of a new contract.

=== Bristol Rovers ===
In June 2016, Moore joined League One club Bristol Rovers on a two-year contract. He made his debut for the "Pirates" on 13 September, in a 1–1 draw with Walsall at the Memorial Stadium. On 28 February 2017, Moore scored his first goal with a late equaliser to earn a 1–1 draw away to Bolton Wanderers. He scored his second goal for the club after just 11 seconds in a 1–0 away win at AFC Wimbledon – the fastest ever goal in Bristol Rovers' league history. However, he struggled for first-team appearances, and went from 8 November 2017 to 10 February 2018 without making it onto the pitch. He was released by manager Darrell Clarke at the end of the 2017–18 season.

=== Bury ===
On 4 June 2018, Moore signed for newly relegated League Two side Bury. Manager Ryan Lowe, a former teammate at Crewe Alexandra, described his signing as a "big coup". On 15 September, he scored his first two goals for the club in a 2–1 win at Swindon Town, earning himself a place on the EFL Team of the Week. He scored a total of eight goals in 23 starts and 21 substitute appearances as the "Shakers" secured automatic promotion at the end of the 2018–19 season, before quitting his contract 12 months early over non-payment of his wages.

=== Plymouth Argyle ===
On 23 July 2019, he signed with League Two side Plymouth Argyle, becoming the fifth player from financially troubled Bury to follow manager Ryan Lowe from Gigg Lane to Home Park that summer. He made his "Pilgrims" debut in a 3–0 victory over former club Crewe Alexandra on the opening day of the 2019–20 season. He scored his first goal for Plymouth in an EFL Trophy tie against former club Bristol Rovers on 3 September. In January, Plymouth Herald reporter Chris Errington wrote that "quietly, almost unnoticed, Byron Moore is going about having a very good season for Plymouth Argyle." The next month, manager Ryan Lowe praised his versatility and consistency. Plymouth went on to win promotion at the end of the 2019–20 season, with Moore scoring six goals from 36 appearances. In Plymouth's first season back in League One he made 43 appearances, scoring once, but was released by the club at the end of the season. Lowe said that it was a difficult decision to release Moore but that "he hasn't performed as well as he probably would have liked and I would have liked."

=== Torquay United ===
On 29 October 2021, Moore signed for National League side Torquay United after having impressed manager Gary Johnson on trial. He was on a "cut-price" three-month deal at Plainmoor. He made his debut the following day when he came off of the bench in a 1–1 draw at Wrexham.

=== AFC Telford United ===
On 11 February 2022, Moore joined National League North side AFC Telford United on a deal until the end of the 2021–22 season. Manager Paul Carden explained that Moore was looking for a club close to his home in Crewe. He scored one goal in 15 appearances for the "Bucks" in the second half of the season. Speaking in January 2023, manager Kevin Wilkin said that he was impressed by the "grit and determination" in his attitude. Moore featured 36 times in the league during the 2022–23 campaign as Telford were relegated in last place. He made 34 appearances in the 2023–24 campaign, scoring four goals.

Wilkin complained that Moore was taking too long to return to fitness following a calf injury sustained in December 2024. He played 32 games in the 2024–25 campaign, including the play-off final victory over Kettering Town that secured promotion. He was released at the end of the season.

=== Nantwich Town ===
On 6 June 2025, Moore joined Northern Premier League Division One West side Nantwich Town. He signed a new contract in January 2026, having scored later winners against Avro in the FA Cup and Shifnal Town in the league.

== Style of play ==
Crewe Alexandra manager Steve Davis criticised Moore for his lack of goalscoring ability during the course of his time at the club, though stated that this was the player's only weakness as a winger. In January 2013 he said that "he works very hard in training but there's just something missing with him". In June 2014 he stated that Moore had the potential to become a "key player" but was still young enough to improve further. He can play a winger or as a forward.

In the 3–5–2 formation utilised by manager Ryan Lowe at first Bury, and then Plymouth Argyle, Moore's versatility and stamina saw him utilised as both a striker and as a wing-back, often starting up front, before moving to wing-back as a result of second-half substitutions. Lowe commented, "He can play left side, he can play right side, he can play centre forward... he looks absolutely shattered on 60 minutes and then when you put him over to left wing or right wing, he just motors again."

== Personal life ==
Born in England, Moore is of Jamaican descent.

== Career statistics ==
As of end of the 2025–26 season

Appearances and goals by club, season and competition
Club	Season	League			FA Cup		League Cup		Other		Total	
Club	Season	Division	Apps	Goals	Apps	Goals	Apps	Goals	Apps	Goals	Apps	Goals
Crewe Alexandra	2007–08	League One	33	2	2	0	1	0	0	0	36	2
Crewe Alexandra	2008–09	League One	36	3	1	0	3	1	1 (Note: Appearances in Football League Trophy / EFL Trophy.)	0	41	4
Crewe Alexandra	2009–10	League Two	32	3	1	0	1	0	1	0	35	3
Crewe Alexandra	2010–11	League Two	38	6	1	0	2	0	2	0	43	6
Crewe Alexandra	2011–12	League Two	42	8	1	1	1	0	5 (Note: Two appearances in EFL Trophy; three in EFL League Two play-offs.)	1	49	10
Crewe Alexandra	2012–13	League One	41	4	2	0	2	0	5	0	50	4
Crewe Alexandra	2013–14	League One	40	4	2	0	0	0	1	0	43	4
Crewe Alexandra	Total		262	30	10	1	10	1	15	1	297	33
Port Vale	2014–15	League One	15	1	1	0	1	0	1	0	18	1
Port Vale	2015–16	League One	36	3	2	1	2	1	1	0	41	5
Port Vale	Total		51	4	3	1	3	1	2	0	59	6
Bristol Rovers	2016–17	League One	27	2	2	0	0	0	1	0	30	2
Bristol Rovers	2017–18	League One	20	0	0	0	3	0	3	0	26	0
Bristol Rovers	Total		47	2	2	0	3	0	4	0	56	2
Bury	2018–19	League Two	36	5	2	2	1	0	5	1	44	8
Plymouth Argyle	2019–20	League Two	30	5	3	0	1	0	2	1	36	6
Plymouth Argyle	2020–21	League One	38	1	3	0	1	0	1	0	43	1
Plymouth Argyle	Total		68	6	6	0	2	0	3	1	79	7
Torquay United	2021–22	National League	5	0	0	0	—		0	0	5	0
AFC Telford United	2021–22	National League North	15	1	0	0	—		0	0	15	1
AFC Telford United	2022–23	National League North	36	2	0	0	—		1 (Note: Appearances in FA Trophy.)	0	37	2
AFC Telford United	2023–24	Southern League; Premier Division Central	32	4	1	0	—		1	0	34	4
AFC Telford United	2024–25	Southern League; Premier Division Central	26	3	1	0	—		5 (Note: 3 appearances in the FA Trophy and 2 appearances in the play-offs)	0	32	3
AFC Telford United	Total		109	10	2	0	0	0	7	0	118	10
Career totals			578	57	25	4	19	2	36	3	658	66

== Honours ==
Crewe Alexandra

- Football League Two play-offs: 2012
- Football League Trophy: 2012–13

Bury

- EFL League Two second-place promotion: 2018–19

Plymouth Argyle

- EFL League Two third-place promotion: 2019–20

AFC Telford United

- Southern League Premier Division Central play-offs: 2025
