= Harry Davis (footballer, born 1991) =

English footballer (born 1991)

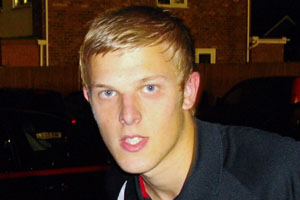
- Davis in 2010

Personal information
- Full name: Harry Spencer Davis
- Date of birth: 24 September 1991 (age 35)
- Place of birth: Burnley, England
- Height: 6 ft 1 in (1.85 m)
- Position: Centre back

Team information
- Current team: Northwich Victoria
- Number: 4

Youth career
- –2009: Crewe Alexandra

Senior career*
Years	Team	Apps	(Gls)
2009–2017	Crewe Alexandra	184	(12)
2017	→ St Mirren (loan)	6	(2)
2017–2018	St Mirren	20	(3)
2018–2020	Grimsby Town	56	(4)
2020–2021	Morecambe	27	(0)
2021–2022	Scunthorpe United	14	(2)
2022–2025	AFC Fylde	102	(5)
2025-	Northwich Victoria	30	(7)
- * Club domestic league appearances and goals as of 11:32, 28 January 2022 (UTC)

Harry Spencer Davis (born 24 September 1991) is an English professional footballer who plays as a centre back for National League club AFC Fylde. Davis has previously played for Crewe Alexandra, St Mirren, Grimsby Town, Morecambe and Scunthorpe United. Early in his career, he was loaned by Crewe to Nantwich Town, Stafford Rangers and Curzon Ashton.

== Career ==
=== Crewe Alexandra ===
Davis was born in Burnley, Lancashire. After progressing through the club's academy, he made his first-team debut for Crewe Alexandra on 8 May 2010, in a 1–0 defeat to Bradford City on the final day of the 2009–10 season. Before making his Crewe debut he enjoyed a short loan spell at Northern Premier League Premier Division team Nantwich Town. He was given his first professional contract in May 2010. In August 2010 he joined Stafford Rangers of the Conference North on a one-month loan, along with teammate Kelvin Mellor. His second game for the club came on the final day of the following season, also against Bradford. Crewe won the game 5–1 at Valley Parade.

He started in the first game of the following season, a 3–0 defeat away to Swindon Town. He began to feature regularly under manager Dario Gradi and scored his first goal for the club in a 3–1 defeat to Southend United on 8 October 2011. A few games later he scored in a 1–0 away win to Cheltenham Town. On 10 November 2011, Gradi stepped down as manager of Crewe, with Harry's father Steve Davis taking over as manager. After scoring penalties in a 1–0 win against Bradford, a 3–0 win against Bristol Rovers and in a 1–1 draw against Rotherham United, Davis helped Crewe to reach the 2012 League Two play-off final at Wembley Stadium, which Crewe won 2–0 against Cheltenham and were promoted to League One. The following year, he was part of Crewe's winning side in the 2013 Football League Trophy Final at Wembley.

In January 2015, Davis signed a 2½-year contract to remain at Crewe. He was announced as club captain for the 2015–16 season. At the end of this contract, Crewe announced that Davis had been released by the club.

=== St Mirren ===
On 31 January 2017, Davis signed on loan with Scottish Championship side St Mirren until the end of the 2016–17 season, and scored on his debut in a 2–2 draw at Dumbarton. Davis suffered a knee injury in St Mirren's 3–2 win over Dundee United in the Scottish Championship on 15 March 2017, after scoring his third goal for the club, and was set to return to Crewe for treatment.

He signed on a permanent basis with St Mirren on 1 August 2017. Davis helped St Mirren win the 2017–18 Scottish Championship, but decided to leave at the end of the season for family reasons.

=== Grimsby Town ===
Davis signed an initial one-year deal with EFL League Two side Grimsby Town on a free transfer on 7 June 2018. He was released by Grimsby Town on 21 May 2020.

=== Morecambe ===
Davis signed for Morecambe on 2 August 2020 on a one-year deal following his release from Grimsby Town.

=== Scunthorpe United ===
On 30 June 2021, Davis joined League Two side Scunthorpe United on a one-year deal, making 17 appearances and scoring twice.

=== AFC Fylde ===
On 28 January 2022, Davis joined National League North side AFC Fylde on a free transfer.

== Style of play ==
Throughout his career, Davis is noted as a centre back and can also play as a right back, he established himself as a full back at Crewe in the 2011–12 season under Dario Gradi.

== Personal life ==
Harry Davis's playing career at Crewe coincided with his father Steve's managerial roles at the club. Steve Davis was assistant manager at Crewe as Harry made his debut, later (November 2011) becoming manager. When Steve Davis was sacked in January 2017, Harry Davis sought a loan move away from the club.

Harry's younger brother, Joe, was a defender at Port Vale, having previously been at Port Vale (first spell), Leicester City and Fleetwood Town. On 22 February 2014, for 33 minutes of a match at Port Vale, the two brothers played on opposite sides against each other.

== Career statistics ==
As of match played 13 March 2021

Appearances and goals by club, season and competition
Club	Season	League			Cup (Note: Cup competitions include the FA Cup, Scottish Cup)		League Cup		Other		Total	
Club	Season	Division	Apps	Goals	Apps	Goals	Apps	Goals	Apps	Goals	Apps	Goals
Crewe Alexandra	2009–10	League Two	1	0	0	0	0	0	0	0	1	0
Crewe Alexandra	2010–11	League Two	1	0	0	0	0	0	0	0	1	0
Crewe Alexandra	2011–12	League Two	41	5	0	0	1	0	5 (Note: Two appearances in Football League Trophy, three in League Two play-offs)	0	47	5
Crewe Alexandra	2012–13	League One	42	1	2	0	2	0	4 (Note: Appearance(s) in Football League Trophy)	0	50	1
Crewe Alexandra	2013–14	League One	32	3	2	0	1	1	1	0	36	4
Crewe Alexandra	2014–15	League One	31	1	2	0	0	0	0	0	33	1
Crewe Alexandra	2015–16	League One	11	1	0	0	0	0	0	0	11	1
Crewe Alexandra	2016–17	League Two	25	1	2	0	1	0	1 (Note: Appearance(s) in EFL Trophy)	0	29	1
Crewe Alexandra	Total		184	12	8	0	5	1	11	0	208	13
Stafford Rangers (loan)	2010–11	Conference North	6	0	—		—		—		6	0
St Mirren (loan)	2016–17	Scottish Championship	6	2	2	1	—		1	0	9	3
St Mirren	2017–18	Scottish Championship	20	3	2	0	0	0	0	0	22	3
St Mirren	Total		26	5	4	1	0	0	1	0	31	6
Grimsby Town	2018–19	League Two	35	4	2	0	1	0	0	0	38	4
Grimsby Town	2019–20	League Two	21	0	1	0	2	0	2	0	26	0
Grimsby Town	Total		56	4	3	0	3	0	2	0	64	4
Morecambe	2020–21	League Two	27	0	2	0	3	0	2	1	28	1
Scunthorpe United	2021–22	League Two	14	2	0	0	1	0	2	0	17	2
Career total			307	23	17	1	12	1	18	1	348	26

== Honours ==
Crewe Alexandra

- Football League Two play-offs: 2012
- Football League Trophy: 2012–13

St Mirren

- Scottish Championship: 2017–18

Morecambe

- EFL League Two play-offs: 2021
