= Jordan Connerton =

English footballer (born 1989)

Personal information
- Full name: Jordan Stuart Connerton
- Date of birth: 2 October 1989 (age 37)
- Place of birth: Lancaster, England
- Height: 5 ft 11 in (1.80 m)
- Position: Striker

Youth career
- 2003–2005: Lancaster City

Senior career*
Years	Team	Apps	(Gls)
2006–2007	Lancaster City	25	(2)
2008–2009	Chorley	12	(5)
2009	Kendal Town	1	(1)
2009–2010	Lancaster City	57	(38)
2010–2012	Crewe Alexandra	1	(0)
2010	→ Nantwich Town (loan)	11	(9)
2011	→ ÍBV (loan)	4	(0)
2011–2012	→ Kendal Town (loan)	8	(5)
2012	→ Workington (loan)	7	(3)
2012–2013	Workington	11	(6)
2013	Kendal Town	6	(7)
2013-2014	Lancaster City	17	(9)
2014–2015	Kendal Town	28	(26)
2015	Kendal Town	17	(12)
2015–2016	Chorley	14	(6)
2016–2017	Lancaster City	43	(35)
2017–2019	Craigieburn City	59	(142)
- * Club domestic league appearances and goals as of 23:59, 7 September 2019 (UTC)

Jordan Stuart Connerton (born 2 October 1989) is an English footballer who last played as a striker for Lancaster City.

== Career ==
=== Early career ===
He started his football career with Lancaster City at the age of just sixteen years of age playing in the Football Conference as Lancaster were relegated with just one point to their name. This was due to the club having to go into administration due to financial difficulties.

Soon after the end of the 2006–07 season after a bad injury, Jordan was then picked up by Chorley, scoring five goals in twelve appearances before moving to Kendal Town, under Lee Ashcroft, scoring on his debut in a 2–2 draw in his only game for them. Similar to his spell at Chorley, he was hampered by injuries and he returned to Lancaster City in the summer of 2009.

=== Crewe Alexandra ===
After a superb season in which he had scored 30 goals by Christmas, he was signed on a three-year contract by Crewe Alexandra for a fee believed to be in the region of £35,000. Indeed, there had been interest from several clubs, including Morecambe, Swindon Town, Derby County, Preston North End, Rochdale, Grimsby Town, Leeds United, Celtic and Motherwell. In fact a move to Motherwell looked the more likely with a deal more or less finalised until manager Jim Gannon left the club. After signing for Crewe he was however loaned back to Lancaster City for the remainder of the season in order to help them with their promotion push.

Made his Crewe Alexandra debut as a substitute, replacing Matt Tootle just before half time in the 2nd round League Cup defeat to Ipswich Town.

Jordan went on loan to Nantwich Town and scored nine goals in eleven appearances before returning to Crewe. He made his League debut for Crewe in their home game against Cheltenham Town. At the end of the English 2010–11 season, he was loaned to Icelandic club ÍBV, along with midfielder Kelvin Mellor, until July 2011 although returned home early due to injury.

Had a loan spell at Kendal scoring five times in eight games before returning to Crewe.

He joined Workington on loan in March 2012 and scored on his debut against Solihull Moors

For the 2012–13 season, Jordan signed for Conference North league club Workington F.C. although only played a dozen games due to injury.

Jordan returned for a third spell with Kendal Town at the start of the 2013–14 season but moved on after just four months to return to hometown club Lancaster City in November 2013.

In December 2015, he was signed for Chorley for the second time, by Matt Jansen. After a slow start, Jordan found his goalscoring vein, scoring 6 times in total. He also won the Lancashire cup during this spell.

For the start of the 2016–17 season he returned to hometown club Lancaster City for a fourth spell and was back to his prolific best.

In May 2017, Connerton moved to Melbourne, Australia, and signed for ninth tier semi-professional club Craigieburn City FC. In his first season at the club, he scored 55 goals in only 17 appearances in a 21 match season, including eight in his team's 13–0 victory over Reservoir Yeti. He became the top goal scorer in his division that season, thirty goals clear of teammate Taner Altanhan.

== Personal and early life ==
Connerton was born and educated in Lancaster, Lancashire, before he enrolled at Myerscough College near Garstang.
