= A-Jay Leitch-Smith =

English footballer (born 1990)

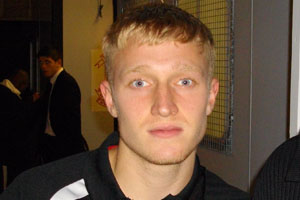
- Leitch-Smith in 2010

Personal information
- Full name: Jay Leitch-Smith
- Date of birth: 6 March 1990 (age 36)
- Place of birth: Crewe, England
- Height: 5 ft 8 in (1.73 m)
- Position: Forward

Team information
- Current team: Northwich Victoria

Youth career
- 1997–2008: Crewe Alexandra

Senior career*
Years	Team	Apps	(Gls)
2008–2014	Crewe Alexandra	103	(19)
2008	→ FC Halifax Town (loan)		
2009	→ Newcastle Town (loan)		
2009	→ ÍBV (loan)	14	(4)
2010	→ Curzon Ashton (loan)		
2014–2015	Yeovil Town	33	(2)
2015–2016	Port Vale	37	(10)
2016–2018	Shrewsbury Town	16	(1)
2017–2018	→ Dundee (loan)	28	(6)
2018–2021	Morecambe	53	(9)
2021–2022	Altrincham	19	(4)
2022	Nantwich Town	14	(2)
2022–2023	Warrington Rylands	9	(2)
2023	→ Hyde United (loan)	5	(1)
2023	Nantwich Town	5	(0)
2023–2024	Stafford Rangers	21	(1)
2024–2025	Hanley Town	20	(2)
2025–	Northwich Victoria		
- * Club domestic league appearances and goals as of 14:54, 15 May 2025 (UTC)

Jay Leitch-Smith (born 6 March 1990), known as A-Jay Leitch-Smith, is an English former professional footballer who plays as a forward for Midland League Premier Division club Northwich Victoria.

A graduate of the Academy at Crewe Alexandra, he played on loan for FC Halifax Town, Newcastle Town, ÍBV (Iceland), and Curzon Ashton. He spent six years with Crewe, winning the League Two play-offs in 2012 and the Football League Trophy in 2013. He signed with Yeovil Town in June 2014 but moved on to Port Vale in July 2015 after a poor season with Yeovil. He finished as Port Vale's top-scorer before moving on to Shrewsbury Town in June 2016. He joined Scottish Premiership club Dundee on loan for the 2017–18 season. He signed with Morecambe in August 2018 and remained with the club for three seasons. He joined National League side Altrincham in August 2021 and moved on to Warrington Rylands via Nantwich Town in 2022. He joined Hyde United for a brief spell on loan in March 2023. He rejoined Nantwich the following season before a switch to Stafford Rangers, Hanley Town, and Northwich Victoria.

== Career ==
=== Crewe Alexandra ===
Whilst on the books at Crewe Alexandra as a youth player, Leitch-Smith was loaned out to non-League clubs FC Halifax Town in November 2008 and Newcastle Town in March 2009. He signed his first professional contract in April 2009, before joining Icelandic club ÍBV on loan. He was recalled from his loan, along with Chris Clements, in early September due to injury problems at Crewe.

He made his League Two debut for Crewe at Gresty Road in a 3–2 defeat to Bury on 29 September 2009, replacing Joel Grant as a substitute in the 80th minute. This was his only appearance of the 2009–10 season. He joined Curzon Ashton on loan in March 2010. He scored seven goals in ten Northern Premier League appearances, which was enough to win him a new contract at Crewe.

He scored his first goal in the English Football League on 21 August 2010, adding the final goal of the "Railwaymen's" 7–0 win over Barnet. However, he was limited to only 18 appearances in the 2010–11 season as he struggled to step up to first-team football, and manager Dario Gradi devised a special pre-season fitness programme in the summer to help him to adapt to senior football.

Leitch-Smith scored nine goals in 44 games in the 2011–12 campaign. He signed a new one-year contract in April 2012, and manager Steve Davis stated, "I'd like to think that he can become the 15 to 20 goal a season man we need." On 27 May, he played the first 85 minutes of the League Two play-off final victory over Cheltenham Town at Wembley Stadium, providing the assist for Byron Moore's goal which secured the 2–0 victory and Crewe's promotion into League One.

He scored six goals in 35 matches in the 2012–13 season. On 7 April he made another appearance at Wembley, as the Alex beat Southend United 2–0 in the Football League Trophy final; he was an 83rd-minute substitute for Max Clayton. The next month he signed a one-year extension to his existing contract. However, he played just 24 games in the 2013–14 season, scoring two goals. He left Crewe after an eleven-year association with his hometown club.

=== Yeovil Town ===
In June 2014, Leitch-Smith signed for Gary Johnson's League One club Yeovil Town on a two-year contract. He struggled in his first season for the "Glovers", as he was played mostly in a wide position. He only scored twice in 38 appearances. He was one of four players offered a contract termination by new manager Paul Sturrock following Yeovil's relegation into League Two at the end of the season.

=== Port Vale ===
In July 2015, Leitch-Smith signed a 12-month deal with League One side Port Vale after agreeing to leave Yeovil. He earned the contract after impressing manager Rob Page during pre-season training. He scored his first goal for the "Valiants" on 14 November, with a header that opened the scoring in a 2–1 win at Barnsley. This was to start a sequence of five goals in four games, which was the best scoring run of his career to that point. For his performances he was short-listed for the League One player of the month award. After scoring his sixth goal of the season in a 1–1 draw with Scunthorpe United at Vale Park on 12 December he was named in the Football League Paper's team of the day. He scored four goals in four games in January to go into double figures for the season to earn himself a nomination for the PFA fans' Player of the Month award for League One. Chairman Norman Smurthwaite confirmed that Leitch-Smith had rejected the offer of a new contract from the club in May 2016.

=== Shrewsbury Town ===
Leitch-Smith signed with League One side Shrewsbury Town in June 2016, along with former Port Vale teammates Ryan McGivern and Louis Dodds. He scored his first goal for the club in the first minute of a first-round League Cup tie against Championship side Huddersfield Town, with Shrewsbury going on to win 2–1. After an indifferent run of form in Micky Mellon's last weeks as manager, he was recalled to the starting eleven by new manager Paul Hurst for an FA Cup first round tie on 5 November, and scored the second goal in a 3–0 victory over Barnet. He was limited to five goals in 12 starts and nine substitute appearances throughout the 2016–17 campaign, and was not allocated a squad number ahead of the following season as he was not in the club's future plans.

On 31 August 2017, he joined Scottish Premiership club Dundee on a five-month loan deal. He made his debut for the "Dee" on 9 September, coming on as a 38th-minute substitute for Scott Allan in a 4–1 defeat at Rangers. He was given his first start at Dens Park seven days later, scoring twice in a 3–2 win over St Johnstone. In January 2018, the loan agreement was extended to the end of the 2017–18 season after "Dee" manager Neil McCann was impressed by the link-up play he made with striker Sofien Moussa despite him being unable to secure a regular place in the starting eleven. He was released by Shrewsbury at the end of the 2017–18 season.

=== Morecambe ===
On 8 August 2018, Leitch-Smith signed a one-year contract with League Two side Morecambe; manager Jim Bentley stated that he had "tried to sign him a couple of years ago." He scored six goals in 29 appearances for the "Shrimps" in the 2018–19 season, having missed the second half of the campaign with a hamstring tear. Despite only scoring six goals and missing half the season he ended the campaign as the club's top-scorer and went on to sign a new two-year contract at the Globe Arena. However, he was restricted to just eight league starts in the 2019–20 season before football was suspended in March due to the COVID-19 pandemic in England. He played just seven times in the 2020–21 promotion season, scoring one goal, and was released at the end of his contract.

=== Non-League ===
On 7 August 2021, Leitch-Smith joined National League side Altrincham. He said that the attractive football played at Moss Lane reminded him of his time at Crewe. He made just four starts during the 2021–22 season, though made a further 15 substitute appearances and scored four goals, claiming one assist.

In July 2022, Leitch-Smith returned to his native Cheshire to join Northern Premier League Premier Division side Nantwich Town. He scored two goals in 16 games for the "Dabbers". In November 2022, Leitch-Smith signed for league rivals Warrington Rylands. He joined Hyde United on loan in March 2023. He scored one goal in five games for Hyde.

Leitch-Smith returned to Nantwich Town on 11 August 2023, and made 11 appearances during the early part of the 2023–24 season, scoring four goals, before leaving to join Stafford Rangers. He left the field injured as Stafford lost 1–0 to Ashton United at Marston Road as relegation from the Northern Premier League Premier Division was confirmed. He switched to divisional rivals Hanley Town in October 2024. He featured 20 times in the 2024–25 campaign, scoring two goals, as the club suffered relegation.

On 28 July 2025, he signed with Midland League Premier Division side Northwich Victoria. The club qualified for the play-offs at the end of the 2025–26 season, and Leitch-Smith played in the play-off final defeat to 1874 Northwich.

== Style of play ==
Though Leitch-Smith lacks natural athleticism and pace, he is an intelligent and creative attacker with good technical skills and a high work rate. Former teammate Tom Pope stated that Leitch-Smith was "one of the most intelligent strikers... in League One".

== Career statistics ==
As of match played 26 April 2025

Appearances and goals by club, season and competition
Club	Season	League			National cup (Note: Includes FA Cup, Icelandic Football Cup, Scottish Cup)		League cup (Note: Includes Football League Cup, Scottish League Cup)		Other		Total	
Club	Season	Division	Apps	Goals	Apps	Goals	Apps	Goals	Apps	Goals	Apps	Goals
Crewe Alexandra	2008–09	League One	0	0	0	0	0	0	0	0	0	0
Crewe Alexandra	2009–10	League Two	1	0	0	0	0	0	0	0	1	0
Crewe Alexandra	2010–11	League Two	16	5	1	0	0	0	1 (Note: Appearance(s) in the Football League Trophy / EFL Trophy.)	0	18	5
Crewe Alexandra	2011–12	League Two	38	8	1	0	1	0	4 (Note: 1 appearance in the Football League Trophy, 3 appearances and 1 goal in the play-offs.)	1	44	9
Crewe Alexandra	2012–13	League One	28	4	0	0	2	1	5	1	35	6
Crewe Alexandra	2013–14	League One	20	2	1	0	1	0	2	0	24	2
Crewe Alexandra	Total		103	19	3	0	4	1	12	2	122	22
ÍBV (loan)	2009	Úrvalsdeild	14	4	0	0	0	0	0	0	14	4
Yeovil Town	2014–15	League One	33	2	3	0	1	0	1	0	38	2
Port Vale	2015–16	League One	37	10	3	2	2	0	1	0	43	12
Shrewsbury Town	2016–17	League One	16	1	1	1	1	1	3	2	21	5
Shrewsbury Town	2017–18	League One	0	0	0	0	0	0	0	0	0	0
Shrewsbury Town	Total		16	1	1	1	1	1	3	2	21	5
Dundee (loan)	2017–18	Scottish Premiership	28	6	3	1	1	0	—		32	7
Morecambe	2018–19	League Two	25	6	2	0	1	0	1	0	29	6
Morecambe	2019–20	League Two	23	2	1	0	1	0	1	0	26	2
Morecambe	2020–21	League Two	5	1	1	0	0	0	1	0	7	1
Morecambe	Total		53	9	4	0	2	0	3	0	62	9
Altrincham	2021–22	National League	19	4	0	0	—		0	0	19	4
Nantwich Town	2022–23	Northern Premier League; Premier Division	14	2	1	0	—		1 (Note: Appearances in FA Trophy)	0	16	2
Warrington Rylands 1906	2022–23	Northern Premier League; Premier Division	9	2	0	0	—		0	0	9	2
Warrington Rylands 1906	2023–24	Northern Premier League; Premier Division	0	0	0	0	—		0	0	0	0
Warrington Rylands 1906	Total		9	2	0	0	0	0	0	0	9	2
Hyde United (loan)	2022–23	Northern Premier League; Premier Division	5	1	0	0	—		0	0	5	1
Nantwich Town	2023–24	Northern Premier League; Division One West	5	0	3	2	—		3 (Note: Two appearances, one goal, in FA Trophy; one appearance, one goal, in Cheshire Senior Cup)	2	11	4
Stafford Rangers	2023–24	Northern Premier League; Premier Division	19	1	0	0	—		1 (Note: One appearance in Staffordshire Senior Cup)	0	20	1
Stafford Rangers	2024–25	Northern Premier League; Division One West	2	0	0	0	—		1	0	3	0
Stafford Rangers	Total		21	1	0	0	0	0	2	0	23	1
Hanley Town	2024–25	Northern Premier League; Division One West	20	2	0	0	—		0	0	20	2
Career total (Note: Statistics for FC Halifax Town, Newcastle Town, Curzon Ashton and Northwich Victoria unavailable.)			377	63	21	6	11	2	26	6	435	77

== Honours ==
Crewe Alexandra

- Football League Two play-offs: 2012
- Football League Trophy: 2012–13
