= Carbrini Sportswear =

British sportswear brand

Carbrini Sportswear was a leisure wear brand of clothing that was sold at JD Sports and Argos. They developed a full range of leisure wear, ranging from trainers to tracksuits. They also made a line of school bags and lunchboxes. The brand was associated with football and several pro teams that play in the English and Scottish football pyramids were supplied with Carbrini kits and training range.

In 2019, it was revealed that Carbrini sportswear had ceased production.

== Involvement in football ==
Carbrini was first introduced to JD Sports in 2006 with their funky clothing line of urban footwear.

In March 2009, Carbrini Sportswear manufactured a one-off set of unique pink kits for Oldham Athletic for their home game against Leeds United. After the game, the kits were auctioned off on the club's website and all proceeds were donated to a charity associated with the Victoria Breast Unit at the Royal Oldham Hospital.

The Carbrini Sportswear football shirts use Carbrini CBX TEX garment technology, which makes the shirts more breathable and able to wick moisture away from the skin. From the start of the 2010–11 season, the shirts featured the innovative "Twist" design. "The Twist" is an intelligent shirt that allows the shirt to work with the movement of the body.

== Football clubs formerly supplied ==
- (England) Tranmere Rovers
- (England) Crewe Alexandra
- (England) Luton Town
- (England) Morecambe
- (England) Walsall
- (England) Notts County
- (England) Birmingham City
- (England) Aldershot Town
- (England) Blackpool
- (England) AFC Bournemouth
- (England) Carlisle United
- (England) Exeter City
- (England) Macclesfield Town
- (England) Oldham Athletic
- (England) Rochdale
- (Scotland) Inverness Caledonian Thistle
- (Scotland) Ross County
- (Scotland) St Mirren
