= Luke Murphy (English footballer) =

English footballer (born 1989)

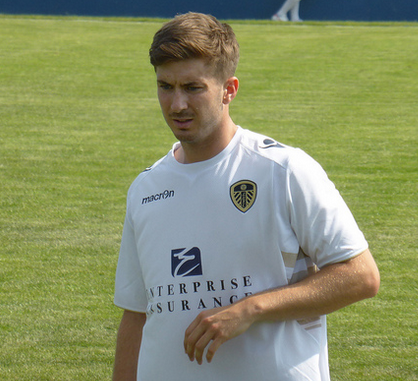
- Murphy playing for Leeds United in 2013

Personal information
- Full name: Luke John Murphy
- Date of birth: 21 October 1989 (age 37)
- Place of birth: Macclesfield, England
- Height: 6 ft 2 in (1.88 m)
- Position: Midfielder

Team information
- Current team: Macclesfield

Youth career
- –2008: Crewe Alexandra

Senior career*
Years	Team	Apps	(Gls)
2008–2013	Crewe Alexandra	161	(21)
2013–2018	Leeds United	103	(7)
2017–2018	→ Burton Albion (loan)	57	(2)
2018–2020	Bolton Wanderers	40	(2)
2020–2022	Crewe Alexandra	78	(1)
2022–2024	Macclesfield	55	(1)
- * Club domestic league appearances and goals as of 15:36, 9 May 2024 (UTC)

Luke John Murphy (born 21 October 1989) is an English professional footballer who most recently played as a midfielder for Northern Premier League Division One West side Macclesfield.

He is a product of Crewe Alexandra's academy. He was Crewe captain prior to spending five years at Leeds United, with a loan spell at Burton Albion, and then two seasons at Bolton Wanderers, before returning to Crewe once again.

== Career ==
=== Crewe Alexandra ===
Born in Macclesfield, Cheshire, Murphy made his debut for Crewe Alexandra on 13 December 2008 in a 1–0 home win against Swindon Town. He scored his first goal for Crewe in a 4–1 away win against Hartlepool United on 28 December 2008. His second goal for the club came in a 3–2 FA Cup replay loss to Millwall on 13 January 2009. He finished his breakthrough season with 11 appearances as Crewe were relegated from League One. He scored his first goal of the 2009–10 season in a 5–3 away loss to Accrington Stanley and scored his second and final goal of the season in a 3–2 away win against Chesterfield on 2 December.

Murphy scored his first goal of the 2010–11 season on 11 September 2010 in a 3–0 win against Bury. He scored again the following game in a 1–1 draw against Burton Albion. His third goal of the season came in a 5–5 draw away to eventual League Two winners Chesterfield. Murphy extended his contract with Crewe in November 2010.

Murphy missed the final month of the 2010–11 season after having a hernia operation. During the 2011–12 pre-season Murphy who had been playing as a right winger was moved into his favoured more central position alongside Ashley Westwood. His 10th league goal for Crewe came in the 2011–12 season, during a 3–2 against Plymouth Argyle, where he scored two goals. He scored his fifth goal of the 2011–12 season in a 2–0 home win to Accrington. He ended the season with eight goals and helped Crewe secure promotion after beating Cheltenham Town in the 2012 League Two play-off final at Wembley Stadium, to win promotion back to League One.

After the departure of Ashley Westwood to Aston Villa, Murphy was appointed as the new Crewe Alexandra Captain in August 2012. In September 2012, Murphy signed a new 2-year deal at Crewe. On 7 April 2013, Murphy scored the first goal in the Football League Trophy final against Southend United, which Crewe went on to win 2–0. In the final match of the 2012–13 season, Murphy led out a Crewe Alexandra side against Walsall in a 2–0 win in which Murphy scored the opening goal for Crewe. The game made history being the first English fixture a side had fielded a team entirely made out of their academy players.

Murphy who was the captain of Crewe Alexandra collected the club's Player of the Year award for the 2012–13 season, a season in which he scored nine goals, gained 12 assists and captained Crewe to victory for the Football League Trophy. Murphy also finished 4th in the voting for the League One player-of-the-season for 2012–13. Murphy was also named in the 2012–13 PFA Team of the Year for League One. After the season Murphy proclaimed that he was ready to step up to play at a higher level. Murphy was heavily linked with a move to Premier League side Aston Villa to join up with ex-teammate Ashley Westwood. On 25 June, Crewe assistant manager Neil Baker revealed he expected Murphy to leave the club for a higher level and that he would go with the club's blessing.

=== Leeds United ===
==== 2013–14 season ====
In June 2013, Crewe accepted bids believed to be over £1 million from both Wolverhampton Wanderers and Blackburn Rovers for Murphy. Despite this on 1 July, Leeds United confirmed the signing of Murphy on a three-year deal. Crewe manager, Steve Davis revealed the transfer fee for Murphy was above £1 million. The signing of Murphy was the first time that Leeds had spent over £1 million on a transfer fee since signing Richard Cresswell in 2005.

Murphy made his debut against Brighton & Hove Albion on 3 August in the first game of the season, he scored a dramatic 94th-minute winner in the game to give Leeds a 2–1 victory. On 12 April 2014, Murphy scored both goals in Leeds' 2–0 victory against Blackpool. On 15 April, Leeds owner Massimo Cellino revealed after the game that he advised the then Leeds manager Brian McDermott to play Murphy in a more attacking midfield role.

==== 2014–15 season ====
On 1 August 2014, Murphy was assigned the Leeds number seven shirt for the 2014–15 season. On 27 August 2014, Murphy was sent off in the first half against Bradford City to condemn Leeds to a shock 2–1 League Cup defeat against the League One opposition. Head coach, Dave Hockaday was sacked the following day.

After a long spell out of favour under new head coach Neil Redfearn Murphy returned to Leeds' starting lineup in the FA Cup 1–0 defeat against Sunderland on 4 January 2015. He started the following league game, a 1–1 draw against Bolton Wanderers on 10 January. He scored in consecutive games for Leeds, firstly helping to earn a point by equalising in a 1–1 draw against Birmingham City on 17 January. He then scored the winner, with a long range strike, in a 1–0 win against Bournemouth on 20 January. As a result of his rise in form over this period Murphy was subsequently nominated for the January 2015 Championship Player of the Month award. Murphy followed this up with a long range strike in a 2–0 victory against Reading on 10 February.

On 2 May 2015, Murphy was one of five players nominated for the Fans Player of the Year Award at Leeds United's official end of 2014–15 season awards ceremony, but lost out to eventual winner Alex Mowatt. Murphy also lost out to goal of the season for his goal against Bournemouth to teammate Rodolph Austin's volley against Watford.

==== 2015–16 season ====
On 9 July 2015, it was announced that Murphy would miss all of pre-season and the beginning of the season after picking up a knee injury which required surgery during pre season training.

Despite being out injured, on 14 July 2015, Murphy signed a new four-year contract at the club keeping him at Leeds until the summer of 2019. The contract saw Murphy actually sign on reduced terms as a considerable sign of his commitment to stay with the club. On 31 July 2015, Murphy was given the number 8 shirt for the upcoming 2015–16 season. After missing all of the pre season and the beginning of the Championship season, on 12 August 2015, Murphy returned for Leeds as a substitute in the League Cup against Doncaster Rovers, Murphy scored a penalty in a penalty shootout with Leeds losing 4–2 on penalties after a 1–1 draw. On 2 April 2016, Murphy scored his first goal of the season and Leeds' only goal in the 2–1 loss to Rotherham.

==== 2016–17 season ====
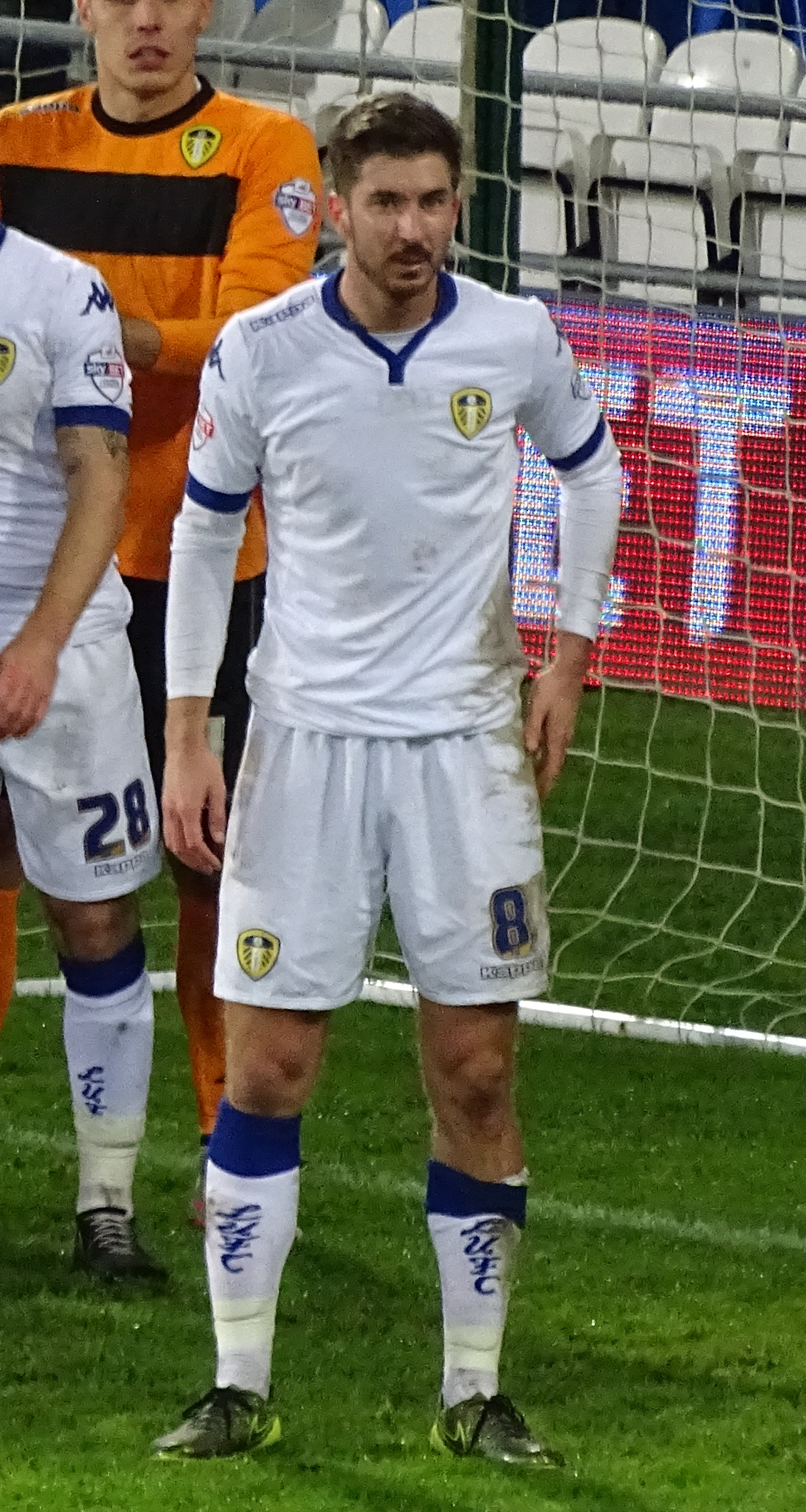
Murphy playing for Leeds United in 2016

He made his first appearance for Leeds on 23 August 2016, starting in Leeds League Cup fixture against Luton Town.

By 24 September, Murphy had fallen so far out of favour that he, along with Toumani Diagouraga and Ross Turnbull, was no longer listed in the Leeds United match programme as a member of the squad, and all three were training with the under-23 team.

==== Burton Albion loan ====
On 6 January 2017, Murphy left Leeds for fellow Championship side Burton Albion, on loan until the end of the 2016–17 season. On 28 January 2017, Murphy scored his first goal for Burton against Queens Park Rangers. He impressed during his time at Burton, and formed a vital partnership in midfield alongside midfielder Jackson Irvine and helped the club to avoid relegation after finishing 20th.

On 3 July 2017, he re-joined Burton on loan for the entirety of the 2017–18 season. Playing in a deeper central midfield position for most of the 2017/18 season, he scored his first goal of the season on 15 April 2018, in a 3–1 victory against Derby County.

==== Return to Leeds ====
With speculation that he was not in Marcelo Bielsa's plans, on 26 July 2018, Murphy was not given a shirt number for Leeds for the upcoming 2018–19 season for Leeds.

=== Bolton Wanderers ===
He was released from his Leeds contract, a year early, on 1 August 2018. The following day he signed for Bolton Wanderers on a two-year contract. He made his debut for Bolton on 4 August 2018 when starting in Wanderers' 2–1 victory over West Bromwich Albion at The Hawthorns. His first goal for Bolton was on 22 October 2019, as he scored the opening goal in Bolton's first win of the 2019/2020 season, a 2–0 win against Bristol Rovers. On 26 June it was announced Murphy would be one of 14 senior players released at the end of his contract on 30 June.

=== Crewe Alexandra ===
On 4 September 2020, Murphy signed a two-year deal to return to Crewe Alexandra, and played in a 2–1 defeat by Lincoln City in the first round of the EFL Cup at Gresty Road the following day, 5 September 2020. Reappointed Crewe captain for the 2021–2022 season, he scored the first (and only) goal of his second spell at Crewe, the winner in a 2–1 victory at Morecambe, on 29 December 2021. Following relegation to League Two, Murphy was released by Crewe at the end of the 2021–22 season, though he continued to train with the club to maintain his fitness during the summer.

=== Macclesfield ===
Murphy joined Northern Premier League Division One West side Macclesfield in late August 2022. He helped them win the title during his first season which meant promotion to the Northern Premier League Premier Division. He was released at the end of the 2023–2024 season.

== Career statistics ==
As of end of 2023–24 season

Appearances and goals by club, season and competition
Club	Season	League			FA Cup		League Cup		Other		Total	
Club	Season	Division	Apps	Goals	Apps	Goals	Apps	Goals	Apps	Goals	Apps	Goals
Crewe Alexandra	2008–09	League One	9	1	2	1	0	0	0	0	11	2
Crewe Alexandra	2009–10	League Two	32	3	1	0	1	0	0	0	34	3
Crewe Alexandra	2010–11	League Two	39	3	1	0	2	0	2 (Note: Appearance(s) in the EFL Trophy.)	0	44	3
Crewe Alexandra	2011–12	League Two	42	8	1	0	1	0	5 (Note: Three appearances in the Football League Trophy and two in the League Two play-offs)	0	49	8
Crewe Alexandra	2012–13	League One	39	6	2	1	2	0	5	2	48	9
Crewe Alexandra	Total		161	21	7	2	6	0	12	2	186	25
Leeds United	2013–14	Championship	37	3	1	0	2	0	0	0	40	3
Leeds United	2014–15	Championship	30	3	1	0	1	0	0	0	32	3
Leeds United	2015–16	Championship	36	1	1	0	1	0	0	0	38	1
Leeds United	2016–17	Championship	0	0	0	0	1	0	0	0	1	0
Leeds United	Total		103	7	3	0	5	0	0	0	111	7
Burton Albion (loan)	2016–17	Championship	19	1	1	0	—		—		20	1
Burton Albion (loan)	2017–18	Championship	38	1	1	0	2	0	0	0	41	1
Burton Albion (loan)	Total		57	2	2	0	2	0	0	0	61	2
Bolton Wanderers	2018–19	Championship	11	0	2	0	0	0	—		13	0
Bolton Wanderers	2019–20	League One	29	2	1	0	1	0	1	0	32	2
Bolton Wanderers	Total		40	2	3	0	1	0	1	0	45	2
Crewe Alexandra	2020–21	League One	40	0	1	0	1	0	1	0	43	0
Crewe Alexandra	2021–22	League One	38	1	1	0	2	0	2	0	43	1
Crewe Alexandra	Total		78	1	2	0	3	0	3	0	86	1
Macclesfield	2022–23	NPL Division One West	35	1	2	0	—		5 (Note: Four appearances in the FA Trophy and one in the Cheshire Senior Cup.)	0	42	1
Macclesfield	2023–24	NPL Premier Division	20	0	2	0	—		7 (Note: Five appearances in the FA Trophy and two in the Cheshire Senior Cup.)	0	29	0
Macclesfield	Total		55	1	4	0	0	0	12	0	71	1
Career total			494	34	21	2	17	0	28	2	556	38

== Honours ==
Crewe Alexandra

- Football League Two play-offs: 2012
- Football League Trophy: 2012–13

Macclesfield

- Northern Premier League Division One West: 2022–23

Individual

- PFA Team of the Year: 2012–13 League One
- Crewe Alexandra Player of the Season: 2012–13
