= Matt Tootle =

English footballer

Personal information
- Full name: Matthew James Anthony Tootle
- Date of birth: 11 October 1990 (age 36)
- Place of birth: Widnes, England
- Height: 5 ft 9 in (1.75 m)
- Position: Defender

Team information
- Current team: Brighouse Town

Youth career
- 1998–2009: Crewe Alexandra

Senior career*
Years	Team	Apps	(Gls)
2009–2015	Crewe Alexandra	199	(2)
2015–2016	Shrewsbury Town	16	(0)
2016–2020	Notts County	95	(4)
2019–2020	→ Chesterfield (loan)	3	(0)
2020–2022	Boston United	38	(0)
2022–2023	Grantham Town	37	(3)
2023–2025	Peterborough Sports	34	(4)
2025–2026	Brighouse Town	1	(0)
2026–	Retford United		
- * Club domestic league appearances and goals as of 13:11, 26 September 2026 (UTC)

Matthew James Anthony Tootle (born 11 October 1990) is an English professional footballer who plays as a defender for Northern Counties East League Premier Division club Retford United.

== Career ==
=== Crewe Alexandra ===
Tootle was born in Widnes, Cheshire. Joining Crewe as an eight-year old, Tootle signed his first professional contract after making an impression on Crewe manager Gudjon Thordarsson in July 2009.

He made his full debut on 21 November for Crewe Alexandra in a 2–2 draw, away at Northampton Town in League Two, playing the full 90 minutes. Tootle became a regular in the first team after Dario Gradi took over for his third spell as Crewe manager. His first goal in senior football came in Crewe's 2–2 draw with Rochdale on Boxing Day 2009.

Tootle appeared in the 2012 Football League Two play-off final at Wembley, as Crewe beat Cheltenham Town 2–0 to win promotion to League One after three seasons in League Two. Less than a year later, Tootle became a winner at Wembley for the second time, playing the whole match as Crewe defeated Southend 2–0 in the 2013 Football League Trophy Final.

As Crewe battled against relegation in the 2013–14 season, Tootle replaced teammate Abdul Osman as captain of the side in March 2014. Crewe stayed up following a final-day win over Preston North End, and following Osman's departure it was decided he would continue in this role for the 2014–15 season.

Despite not featuring since October 2014 due to injury and illness, Crewe offered Tootle a contract extension at the end of the season.

=== Shrewsbury Town ===
Tootle moved to Shrewsbury Town on a free transfer, signing a two-year contract on 16 June 2015. He made his debut on the opening day of the 2015–16 season against Millwall, and scored his first goal for the club in a League Cup second-round tie against Crystal Palace, but he did not feature again at first-team level following a defeat at Port Vale on 31 October. He was released from his contract one year early by mutual consent in June 2016.

=== Notts County ===
On the same day that he left Shrewsbury Town, Tootle joined League Two side Notts County on a two-year contract.

He signed a new contract with Notts County at the end of the 2017–18 season.

At the end of the 2019–20 season, Tootle was released by the club.

=== Non-League ===
On 25 August 2020, Tootle signed for National League North side Boston United.

In February 2025, Tootle joined Northern Premier League Division One East club Brighouse Town.

Tootle joined newly promoted Northern Counties East League Premier Division club Retford United for the 2026/27 season.

== Style of play ==
Tootle can play at either left back or right back, as well as on the wing.[1]

== Career statistics ==
As of match played 31 August 2024

Club statistics
Club	Season	League			FA Cup		League Cup		Other		Total	
Club	Season	Division	Apps	Goals	Apps	Goals	Apps	Goals	Apps	Goals	Apps	Goals
Crewe Alexandra	2009–10	League Two	28	1	0	0	0	0	0	0	28	1
Crewe Alexandra	2010–11	League Two	39	0	1	0	2	0	2 (Note: Appearances in Football League Trophy)	0	44	0
Crewe Alexandra	2011–12	League Two	37	0	1	0	1	0	5 (Note: Two appearances in Football League Trophy, three in Football League Two play-offs)	0	44	0
Crewe Alexandra	2012–13	League One	37	1	2	0	0	0	5	0	44	1
Crewe Alexandra	2013–14	League One	43	0	0	0	1	0	2	0	46	0
Crewe Alexandra	2014–15	League One	15	0	0	0	2	1	1	0	18	1
Crewe Alexandra	Total		199	2	4	0	6	1	15	0	224	3
Shrewsbury Town	2015–16	League One	16	0	0	0	2	2	0	0	18	2
Notts County	2016–17	League Two	33	2	3	0	1	0	1	0	38	2
Notts County	2017–18	League Two	36	2	3	0	1	0	2 (Note: Two appearances in League Two play-offs)	0	42	2
Notts County	2018–19	League Two	24	0	0	0	0	0	0	0	24	0
Notts County	2019–20	National League	2	0	0	0	–		0	0	2	0
Notts County	Total		95	4	6	0	2	0	3	0	106	4
Chesterfield (loan)	2019–20	National League	3	0	0	0	–		0	0	3	0
Boston United	2020–21	National League North	13	0	0	0	–		2 (Note: Appearance(s) in FA Trophy)	0	15	0
Boston United	2021–22	National League North	25	0	0	0	–		3	0	28	0
Boston United	Total		38	0	0	0	–		5	0	43	0
Grantham Town	2022–23	NPL Division One East	37	3	4	1	–		2 (Note: 1 appearance in FA Trophy, 1 appearance in Lincolnshire Senior Cup)	0	43	4
Peterborough Sports	2023–24	National League North	26	3	0	0	–		3	0	29	3
Peterborough Sports	2024–25	National League North	8	1	0	0	–		0	0	8	1
Peterborough Sports	Total		34	4	0	0	–		3	0	37	4
Career total			422	13	14	1	10	3	28	0	474	17

== Honours ==
Crewe Alexandra

- Football League Two play-offs: 2012
- Football League Trophy: 2012–13

Individual

- Crewe Alexandra Player of the Year: 2013–14
