= Kelvin Mellor =

English footballer (born 1991)

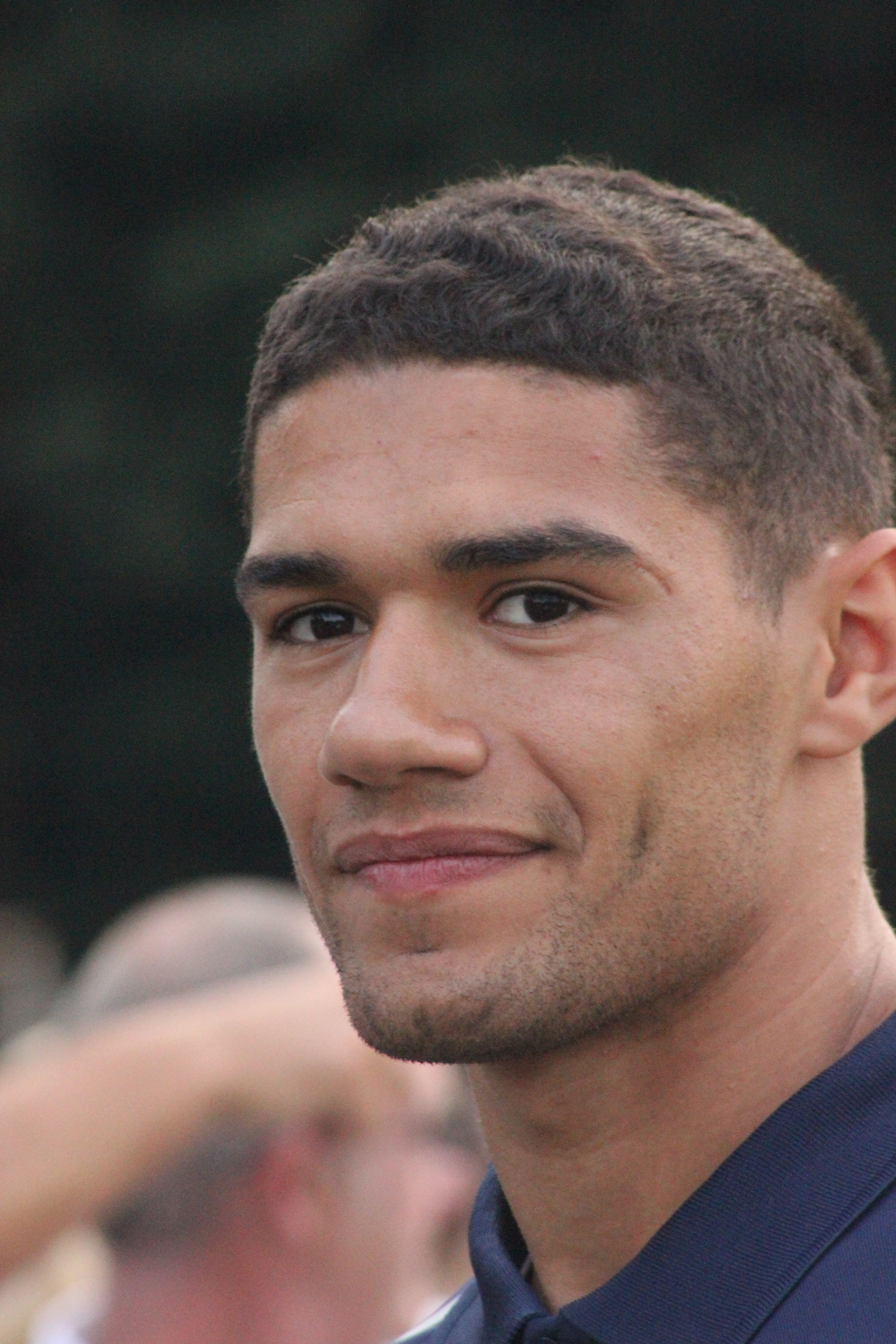
- Mellor in 2012

Personal information
- Full name: Kelvin Mellor
- Date of birth: 25 January 1991 (age 35)
- Place of birth: Crewe, England
- Height: 6 ft 3 in (1.91 m)
- Position: Defender

Senior career*
Years	Team	Apps	(Gls)
2007–2008	Nantwich Town	6	(0)
2008–2014	Crewe Alexandra	76	(2)
2009	→ Nantwich Town (loan)	3	(0)
2010	→ Newcastle Town (loan)	12	(4)
2010	→ Stafford Rangers (loan)	7	(0)
2011	→ Leek Town (loan)	5	(0)
2011	→ ÍBV (loan)	11	(2)
2014–2016	Plymouth Argyle	78	(2)
2016–2018	Blackpool	73	(10)
2018–2020	Bradford City	45	(2)
2020–2021	Morecambe	33	(1)
2021–2022	Carlisle United	21	(0)
2022–2023	Crewe Alexandra	36	(2)
2023–2024	Accrington Stanley	23	(0)
2024-2026	Nantwich Town		
- * Club domestic league appearances and goals as of 14:53, 18 October 2026 (UTC)

Kelvin Mellor (born 25 January 1991) is a retired English professional footballer.

== Early life ==
Mellor was born in Crewe in Cheshire.

== Career ==
=== Nantwich Town ===
Mellor started his career at Nantwich Town, before joining Crewe Alexandra in 2008.

=== Crewe Alexandra ===
After loan spells at Nantwich Town, Newcastle Town and Stafford Rangers, Mellor made his debut for the Alex on 27 November 2010, in the 2–1 win away at Morecambe at the Globe Arena. He came on as a second-half substitute for Byron Moore.

After several further loan spells away from Crewe at Leek Town and Icelandic team ÍBV, Mellor broke into the first team at Crewe towards the end of the 2011–12 season. He scored his first goal for the club in a 3–0 home win over Bristol Rovers. He then played the full game as Crewe won promotion in the League Two play-off final at Wembley with a 2–0 win over Cheltenham Town. He was offered a new contract at the end of the season.

He signed a new two-year contract on 16 July 2012, despite interest from Championship side Derby County, who offered Mellor a three-year contract. Mellor with his father and representatives held talks with Derby after he was initially offered a one-year contract at Crewe, with an angry Derby manager Nigel Clough saying "It must be difficult for him going back to the dressing room after all the things he said to us. And then when everyone was starting back for pre-season he decided to go to Ibiza with his mates for five days."

=== Plymouth Argyle ===
After leaving Crewe Alexandra in the summer of 2014 he signed for League Two side Plymouth Argyle on a two-year deal. Mellor subsequently left Argyle in July 2016.

=== Blackpool ===
In 2016, he signed for Blackpool. He scored his first goal for Blackpool in a 4–2 EFL Cup win against Bolton Wanderers on 9 August 2016.

=== Bradford City ===
On 31 July 2018, Kelvin Mellor signed for fellow League One side Bradford City on a two-year deal On 26 May 2020 it was announced that he was one of 10 players who would leave Bradford City when their contract expired on 30 June 2020.

=== Morecambe ===
On 13 August 2020, Mellor signed for Morecambe. Following promotion with the club to League One, he signed a one-year extension in June 2021.

=== Carlisle United ===
On 31 August 2021, Mellor signed a one-year deal with League Two side Carlisle United. On 9 May 2022, Mellor was released by the club at the end of the 2021–22 season.

=== Return to Crewe ===
On 20 May 2022, Mellor returned to his first professional club Crewe Alexandra on a free transfer following their relegation to League Two. He started in Crewe's opening game of the 2022–23 season, a 2–1 victory over Rochdale at Spotland, and scored in the following game, a 3–0 home win over Harrogate Town at Gresty Road on 6 August 2022. On 12 May 2023, Mellor's departure was announced by the club.

=== Accrington Stanley ===
On 21 July 2023, Mellor signed a one-year deal with League Two side Accrington Stanley. After 26 appearances, he was released by Accrington at the end of the season.

=== Back to Nantwich Town ===
In 2024, Mellor returned to Nantwich Town, after working on the club's Academy programme with Malbank Sixth Form in Nantwich. Player of the season, he stayed with the Dabbers for the 2025–26 season and was appointed as club captain.

== Career statistics ==
As of match played 29 March 2024

Appearances and goals by club, season and competition
Club	Season	League			National Cup		League Cup		Other		Total	
Club	Season	Division	Apps	Goals	Apps	Goals	Apps	Goals	Apps	Goals	Apps	Goals
Crewe Alexandra	2010–11	League Two	1	0	0	0	0	0	0	0	1	0
Crewe Alexandra	2011–12	League Two	12	1	1	0	0	0	4 (Note: One appearance in Football League Trophy and three in League Two play-offs)	0	17	1
Crewe Alexandra	2012–13	League One	35	0	1	0	1	0	5 (Note: Appearances in Football League Trophy)	0	42	0
Crewe Alexandra	2013–14	League One	28	1	2	0	1	0	1	0	32	1
Crewe Alexandra	Total		76	2	4	0	2	0	10	0	92	2
ÍBV (loan)	2011	Úrvalsdeild	10	2	1	0	—		—		11	2
Plymouth Argyle	2014–15	League Two	37	1	2	0	1	0	3 (Note: One appearance in Football League Trophy and two in League Two play-offs)	0	43	1
Plymouth Argyle	2015–16	League Two	41	1	1	0	1	0	6 (Note: Three appearances in Football League Trophy and three in League Two play-offs)	0	49	1
Plymouth Argyle	Total		78	2	3	0	2	0	9	0	92	2
Blackpool	2016–17	League Two	44	4	5	1	2	1	4 (Note: One appearance in EFL Trophy, three appearances in League Two play-offs)	1	55	7
Blackpool	2017–18	League One	29	6	1	0	0	0	4 (Note: Appearance(s) in EFL Trophy)	1	34	7
Blackpool	Total		73	10	6	1	2	1	8	2	89	14
Bradford City	2018–19	League One	20	1	2	1	0	0	0	0	22	2
Bradford City	2019–20	League Two	25	1	2	0	0	0	1	0	28	1
Bradford City	Total		45	2	4	1	0	0	1	0	50	3
Morecambe	2020–21	League Two	32	1	3	0	2	0	3 (Note: Two appearances in EFL Trophy and one in League Two play-offs)	0	40	1
Morecambe	2021–22	League One	1	0	0	0	1	0	0	0	2	0
Morecambe	Total		33	1	3	0	3	0	3	0	42	1
Carlisle United	2021–22	League Two	21	0	1	0	0	0	3	1	25	1
Crewe Alexandra	2022–23	League Two	36	2	2	0	1	0	3	0	42	2
Accrington Stanley	2023–24	League Two	23	0	2	0	0	0	1	0	26	0
Career total			395	21	25	2	9	1	34	2	463	26

== Honours ==
Crewe Alexandra

- Football League Two play-offs: 2012
- Football League Trophy: 2012–13

Blackpool

- EFL League Two play-offs: 2017

Morecambe

- EFL League Two play-offs: 2021

Individual

- PFA Team of the Year: 2016–17 League Two
