= Carl Martin (footballer) =

English footballer

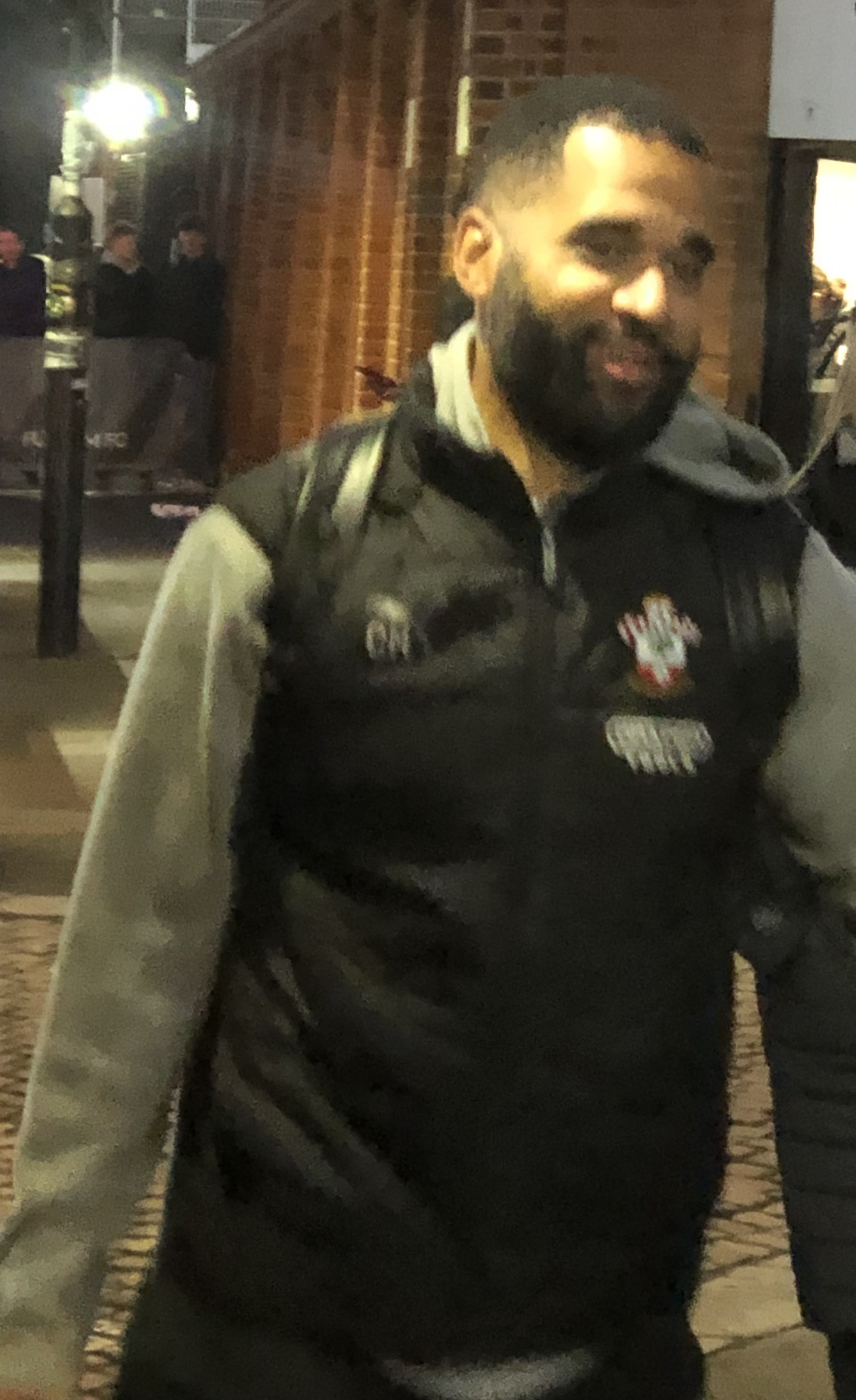
- Carl Martin in 2024

Personal information
- Full name: Carl Clarke Martin
- Date of birth: 24 October 1986 (age 40)
- Place of birth: Camden, England
- Height: 5 ft 8 in (1.73 m)
- Position: Defender

Team information
- Current team: Brighton & Hove Albion (U18s head coach)

Senior career*
Years	Team	Apps	(Gls)
–2009	Wealdstone		
2009–2012	Crewe Alexandra	35	(1)
2012–2014	Macclesfield Town	32	(0)
2014–2015	Wealdstone	35	(1)
- * Club domestic league appearances and goals

Carl Clarke Martin (born 24 October 1986) is an English professional football coach and former player who played as a defender. He is the current Under-18s head coach of Brighton & Hove Albion. He last played in 2015 for Wealdstone.

== Club career ==
Martin was born in Camden, London. He started his career in non-league football with Wealdstone before signing for Football League Two side Crewe Alexandra in October 2009. He made his league debut for Crewe on 19 January 2010 in the 1–1 draw with Hereford United at Edgar Street. On 9 March 2010, Martin was sent off in a league game against Grimsby Town, which led to his manager Dario Gradi slating him to the media, not for the sending off but for not following his manager's instructions by running with the ball. Gradi went on to state that Martin would not feature again until he could trust him to follow instructions, also stating: "whatever ban he gets will be music to my ears."

On 1 June 2012 Martin was released by Crewe Alexandra, joining Macclesfield Town, where he remained until 2014. On 30 June 2014, he returned to Wealdstone.

== Coaching career ==
Martin moved to London to pursue a career in coaching and initially had a part-time role with Watford coaching their U15s. A few months later, he went full-time and coached the U18s.

In January 2019, Martin joined Southampton as U18s coach before being put on a year-long sabbatical at the beginning of the 2020–21 season so he could develop a better understanding of an elite first team environment. Under Martin, Southampton U18s won the Premier League South during the 2021–22 season before losing to Manchester City in the National U18s Premier League final. On 30 June 2022, he stepped up to support the senior side. Following the sacking of Will Still on 2 November 2025, Martin left his position at the club.

On 5 July 2026, it was announced that Martin had been appointed as the Under-18s head coach for Brighton & Hove Albion.

== Honours ==
Crewe Alexandra

- Football League Two play-offs: 2012
