= Caspar Hughes =

English footballer

Personal information
- Full name: Caspar Dennis Shankly Hughes
- Date of birth: 9 June 1993 (age 33)
- Place of birth: Crewe, England
- Height: 5 ft 7 in (1.70 m)
- Positions: Midfielder; right back

Team information
- Current team: Nantwich Town
- Number: 2

Youth career
- –2011: Crewe Alexandra

Senior career*
Years	Team	Apps	(Gls)
2011–2012	Crewe Alexandra	12	(0)
2011	→ Nantwich Town (loan)		
2012	→ Chasetown (loan)		
2012	→ Nantwich Town (loan)	11	(0)
2012–2013	Nantwich Town	33	(4)
2013–2017	AFC Fylde	109	(8)
2017–	Nantwich Town		
- * Club domestic league appearances and goals as of 17 December 2016

Caspar Dennis Shankly Hughes (born 9 June 1993) is an English footballer. Career

Hughes was born in Crewe, Cheshire. He made his debut for Crewe Alexandra in the Football League Two game against Stockport County at the Alexandra Stadium on 30 April 2011, which ended in a 2–0 win for Crewe. He came on as a late substitute for Ashley Westwood. Hughes joined Chasetown of the Northern Premier League on a short-term loan on 6 January 2012, and joined their divisional rivals Nantwich Town on a month's loan on 2 March. He was released by Crewe at the end of the 2011/12 season, subsequently rejoining Nantwich Town on a permanent contract.

He started the 2013–2014 season with AFC Fylde who had gained promotion from the Northern Evostik Premiership. The club was in the English Conference North for seasons 2014–2015 and 2015–2016 where Hughes established himself as a right-back.

Hughes later rejoined Nantwich, and played in the side defeated by Fylde in the first round of the F.A. Cup in November 2019.

== Career statistics ==
As of match played 12 November 2011.

Club	Season	League		FA Cup		League Cup		Other (Note: Includes appearances in Football League Trophy.)		Total	
Club	Season	Apps	Goals	Apps	Goals	Apps	Goals	Apps	Goals	Apps	Goals
Crewe Alexandra	2010–11	1	0	0	0	0	0	0	0	1	0
Crewe Alexandra	2011–12	8	0	1	0	0	0	2	0	7	0
Career total		12	0		0	0	0	2	0	8	0
