= Shaun Miller =

English footballer (born 1987)

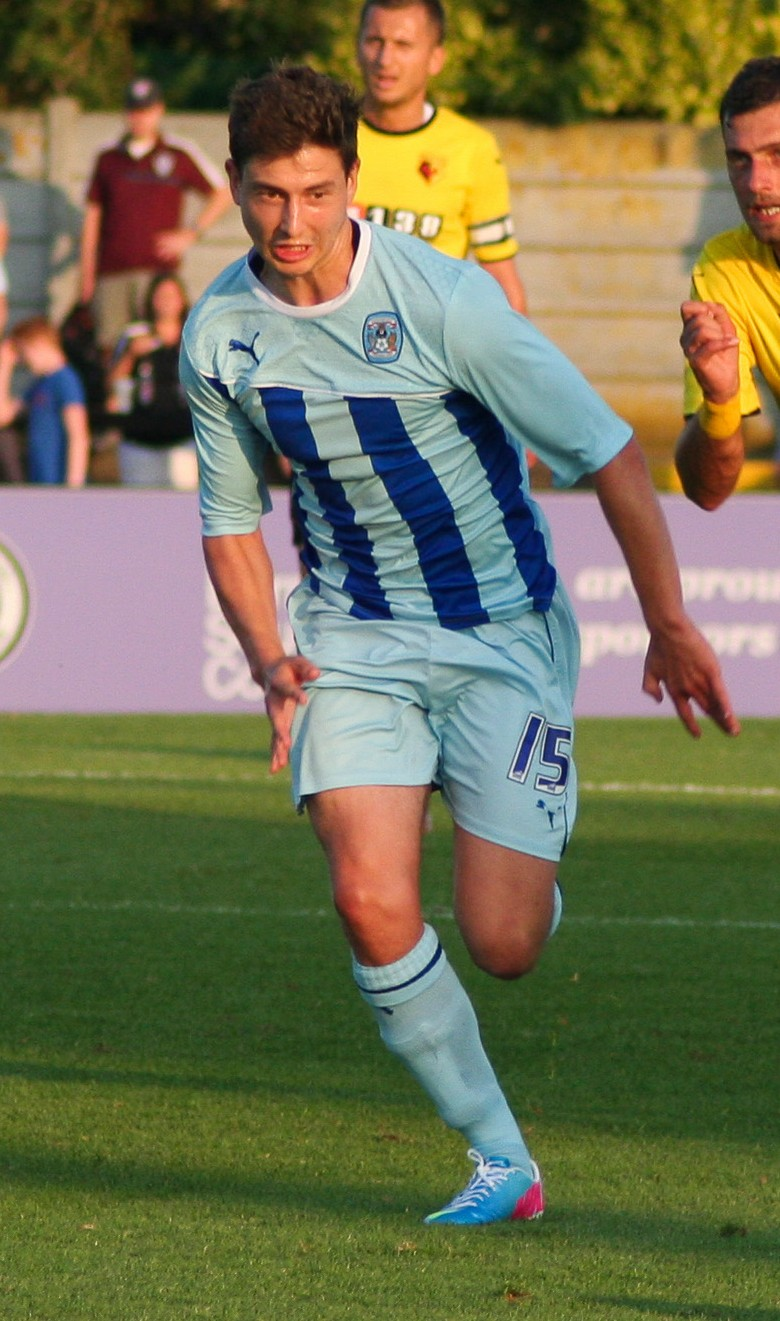
- Miller playing for Coventry City in 2014

Personal information
- Full name: Shaun Robert Miller
- Date of birth: 25 September 1987 (age 39)
- Place of birth: Alsager, England
- Height: 5 ft 10 in (1.78 m)
- Position: Striker

Team information
- Current team: Kidsgrove Athletic

Youth career
- 1995–2006: Crewe Alexandra

Senior career*
Years	Team	Apps	(Gls)
2006–2012	Crewe Alexandra	163	(39)
2006–2007	→ Witton Albion (loan)	3	(1)
2012–2014	Sheffield United	28	(4)
2014	→ Shrewsbury Town (loan)	8	(3)
2014–2015	Coventry City	12	(1)
2014–2015	→ Crawley Town (loan)	5	(0)
2015	→ York City (loan)	6	(0)
2015–2016	Morecambe	37	(15)
2016–2018	Carlisle United	53	(7)
2018	→ Crewe Alexandra (loan)	15	(6)
2018–2020	Crewe Alexandra	29	(3)
2019–2020	→ Morecambe (loan)	18	(2)
2020–2021	Bolton Wanderers	20	(3)
2021–2022	Nantwich Town	36	(4)
2023–	Kidsgrove Athletic	10	(0)
- * Club domestic league appearances and goals as of 20:22, 14 August 2023 (UTC)

Shaun Robert Miller (born 25 September 1987) is an English professional footballer who plays as a striker for Kidsgrove Athletic.

Miller began his career at Crewe Alexandra before moving to Sheffield United in 2012 and Coventry City in 2014. He also spent time on loan at Witton Albion, Shrewsbury Town and York City. He was released by Coventry in 2015 before signing for Morecambe. Miller spent one season there before joining Carlisle United in 2016, returning to Crewe on loan in early 2018 and rejoining the club in May 2018. In July 2019, he returned to Morecambe on a season-long loan. He was released by Crewe in June 2020 and subsequently joined Bolton three months later.

== Early and personal life ==
Born in Alsager, Cheshire, Miller has a son called Zac who was born in January 2014, a son called Luca who was born in April 2016 and a son called Jude who was born in December 2019

.

== Career ==
=== Crewe Alexandra ===
Miller started his career with Crewe Alexandra's youth system, and he signed a professional contract with the club on 3 July 2006. He made his first-team debut on 11 November 2006 in a 4–0 FA Cup loss to Bradford City at Valley Parade. He made his league debut in a 1–0 loss away to Gillingham on 10 March 2007, before marking his first professional start with a goal in a 2–1 loss away to Blackpool at the end of the month.

In his second season Miller was in and out of the first team making 17 appearances, his only goal coming in a 4–1 home loss to AFC Bournemouth. The following season Miller played 40 times for Crewe, scoring 7 goals. He scored his first goal of the 2009–10 season in a 2–1 loss at home to Aldershot Town. He finished the season with 7 goals including a goal in a 1–0 win against rivals Port Vale.

On 21 August 2010, he scored two goals as Crewe beat Barnet 7–0 at home. He scored his fifth goal of the season in an incredible 5–5 draw with Chesterfield. He scored his 17th goal of the season in an 8–1 win against Cheltenham Town. On the final day of the season Miller scored two goals as Crewe beat Bradford 5–1, giving him a total of 19 goals for the season. His first goal of the 2011–12 season came in a 3–2 League Cup defeat to Preston North End. On 3 September he scored two goals as Crewe beat Oxford United 3–1. He scored his 5th league goal of the season in a 3–1 win over Barnet on 10 September. On 17 December 2011 Miller was sent off in a 1–1 draw against Crawley Town.

=== Sheffield United ===
Miller signed for Sheffield United at the end of July 2012, agreeing a two-year contract with the option of a further year. He made his debut on 11 August 2012, in a 2–2 draw against Burton Albion in the League Cup, and made his league debut a week later during a 1–0 win against Shrewsbury Town at Bramall Lane. Miller had to wait until mid October to score his first goals for the club, netting twice in a 4–1 win against Notts County in the Football League Trophy. On 1 December 2012, Miller netted two goals in the 90th minute for the Blades in a 2–1 win over Port Vale in the FA Cup second round. Miller then scored against Scunthorpe in a 3–0 victory on Boxing Day 2012, only to be taken off later in the match with what turned out to be cruciate ligament damage to his knee, ruling him out for almost nine months. Miller did not appear for the United first team again until 19 October 2013, in a 2–1 victory against Port Vale at Bramall Lane. On 4 February 2014, Miller scored an extra time winning goal away at Premier League Fulham in a fourth-round FA Cup replay match.

On 22 March 2014, Miller joined Shrewsbury Town on loan until the end of the season, scoring an injury time winner on his debut, as a substitute against Bradford City. Miller scored three goals in eight appearances before returning to United. On 15 May, it was revealed that Sheffield United would not be renewing Miller's contract, thus making him a free agent.

=== Coventry City ===
Miller signed a one-year contract with League One club Coventry City on 16 July 2014. He scored two goals in the early stages of the season, both coming off the bench against Cardiff City in the League Cup and in the league against Bristol City.

=== Morecambe ===
Miller signed for League Two club Morecambe on 5 August 2015 on a one-year contract.

=== Carlisle United ===
On 17 June 2016, Miller joined Morecambe's League Two rivals Carlisle United on a two-year contract. He scored his first goal for Carlisle in a 2–1 EFL Cup win against Port Vale on 9 August 2016. In October 2017, Miller became the first player to be charged with a simulated dive under new FA rules and served a two match ban.

=== Crewe Alexandra ===
On 25 January 2018, Miller rejoined Crewe Alexandra on loan for the remainder of the 2017–18 season, scoring six goals in 15 appearances. On 17 May 2018, Miller signed a two-year contract, with an option of a further year, to return to Crewe. He scored the first goal of his new spell at Crewe at Gresty Road in a 2–0 win over Grimsby Town on 27 October 2018. However, he made only 16 league starts during the 2018–2019 season, and in May 2019 was transfer-listed at his own request.

==== Morecambe return (loan) ====
On 24 July 2019, Miller returned to Morecambe, on a season-long loan deal from Crewe.

His release by Crewe was announced on 10 June 2020.

=== Bolton Wanderers ===
On 5 September 2020 Miller signed for newly relegated Bolton Wanderers on a one-year contract and was assigned number 20. He made his debut later the same day, coming on as a late substitute for Liam Gordon in Bolton's first match of the season, a 1–2 home defeat against Bradford in the first round of the EFL Cup. He scored his first goal three days later, scoring Bolton's second equaliser after coming off the bench once again in 2–3 home defeat against his former club Crewe Alexandra in the EFL Trophy. His first League goal, and 100th career goal, came on 20 February 2021 as he scored Bolton's winner in a 1–0 win against Southend United. On 19 May 2021 Bolton announced he would be released at the end of his contract.

=== Nantwich Town ===
On 7 August 2021, Miller signed for Northern Premier League side Nantwich Town. He scored on his debut in a 3–2 win against Stalybridge Celtic. Miller had his contract terminated by mutual consent in December 2022.

=== Kidsgrove Athletic ===
On 20 January 2023, Miller signed for Northern Premier League Division One West side Kidsgrove Athletic.

== Career statistics ==
As of match played 22 April 2023

Appearances and goals by club, season and competition
Club	Season	League			FA Cup		League Cup		Other		Total	
Club	Season	Division	Apps	Goals	Apps	Goals	Apps	Goals	Apps	Goals	Apps	Goals
Crewe Alexandra	2006–07	League One	7	3	1	0	0	0	0	0	8	3
Crewe Alexandra	2007–08	League One	15	1	0	0	1	0	1 (Note: Appearance(s) in EFL Trophy)	0	17	1
Crewe Alexandra	2008–09	League One	33	4	4	3	1	0	2	0	40	7
Crewe Alexandra	2009–10	League Two	33	7	0	0	0	0	1	0	34	7
Crewe Alexandra	2010–11	League Two	42	19	0	0	2	0	0	0	44	19
Crewe Alexandra	2011–12	League Two	33	5	0	0	1	1	2	0	36	6
Crewe Alexandra	Total		163	39	5	3	5	1	6	0	179	43
Witton Albion (loan)	2006–07	Northern Premier League	3	1	—		—		1 (Note: Appearance in FA Trophy)	0	4	1
Sheffield United	2012–13	League One	15	4	2	2	1	0	1	2	19	8
Sheffield United	2013–14	League One	13	0	3	1	0	0	0	0	16	1
Sheffield United	Total		28	4	5	3	1	0	1	2	35	9
Shrewsbury Town (loan)	2013–14	League One	8	3	—		—		—		8	3
Coventry City	2014–15	League One	12	1	0	0	1	1	0	0	13	2
Crawley Town (loan)	2014–15	League One	5	0	—		—		—		5	0
York City (loan)	2014–15	League Two	6	0	—		—		—		6	0
Morecambe	2015–16	League Two	37	15	2	0	1	0	3	1	43	16
Carlisle United	2016–17	League Two	30	4	2	0	2	1	5 (Note: Three appearances and two goals in EFL Trophy, two appearances and one goal in League Two play-offs)	3	39	8
Carlisle United	2017–18	League Two	23	3	4	1	2	1	3	1	32	6
Carlisle United	Total		53	7	6	1	4	2	8	4	71	14
Crewe Alexandra (loan)	2017–18	League Two	15	6	—		—		—		15	6
Crewe Alexandra	2018–19	League Two	29	3	1	0	0	0	3	0	33	3
Crewe Alexandra	Total		29	3	1	0	0	0	3	0	33	3
Morecambe (loan)	2019–20	League Two	18	2	1	0	2	0	0	0	21	2
Bolton Wanderers	2020–21	League Two	20	3	1	0	1	0	2	1	24	4
Nantwich Town	2021–22	Northern Premier League	23	4	2	1	—		2	0	27	5
Nantwich Town	2022–23	Northern Premier League	13	0	0	0	—		1 (Note: Appearance(s) in Cheshire Senior Cup)	0	14	0
Nantwich Town	Total		36	4	2	1	0	0	3	0	41	5
Kidsgrove Athletic	2022–23	NPL Division One West	10	0	—		—		2 (Note: Appearance(s) in Staffordshire Senior Cup)	0	12	0
Career total			443	88	23	8	15	4	29	8	508	108
