= 2015–16 Notts County F.C. season =

Notts County F.C.
2015–16 season
- Chairman: Ray Trew
- Manager: Ricardo Moniz (until 29 December); Jamie Fullarton (from 10 January until 19 March); Mark Cooper (from 20 March)
- Stadium: Meadow Lane
- League Two: 17th
- FA Cup: First round (eliminated by Salford City)
- League Cup: Second round (eliminated by Aston Villa)
- Highest home attendance: 10,074 (league)
- Lowest home attendance: 3,098 (league)
- Average home league attendance: 4,860

The 2015–16 season was Notts County's 153rd season in their history and their first season back in League Two since being relegated from League One the previous season. Along with League Two, the club will also compete in the FA Cup, League Cup and League Trophy. The season covers the period from 1 July 2015 to 30 June 2016.

== Transfers ==
=== Transfers in ===
Date from	Position	Nationality	Name	From	Fee	Ref.
1 July 2015	CB	ENG	Scot Bennett	Exeter City	Free transfer	
1 July 2015	CM	ENG	Robert Milsom	Rotherham United	Free transfer	
1 July 2015	LB	NIR	Rhys Sharpe	Derby County	Free transfer	
1 July 2015	RB	BEL	Gill Swerts	NAC Breda	Free transfer	
2 July 2015	CF	ENG	Jon Stead	Huddersfield Town	Free transfer	
3 July 2015	RB	TOG	Mawouna Amevor	Go Ahead Eagles	Free transfer	
6 July 2015	CF	ENG	Adam Campbell	Newcastle United	Free transfer	
6 July 2015	CF	ENG	Kyle de Silva	Crystal Palace	Free transfer	
6 July 2015	LW	SUR	Genaro Snijders	Oss	Free transfer	
7 July 2015	RW	NED	Julian Jenner	Diósgyőri	Free transfer	
8 July 2015	SS	IRL	Graham Burke	Aston Villa	Free transfer	
8 July 2015	SS	SVN	Filip Valenčič	Monza	Free transfer	
15 July 2015	GK	ENG	Scott Loach	Rotherham United	Free transfer	
17 July 2015	CM	BEL	Stanley Aborah	Ferencvárosi	Free transfer	
20 July 2015	RB	ENG	Wes Atkinson	West Bromwich Albion	Free transfer	
3 August 2015	CB	FRA	Thierry Audel	Crewe Alexandra	Free transfer	
4 August 2015	RB	WAL	Elliott Hewitt	Ipswich Town	Free transfer	
6 August 2015	CB	CUR	Civard Sprockel	Othellos Athienou	Free transfer	
22 August 2015	CF	ENG	Izale McLeod	Crawley Town	Undisclosed	
13 February 2016	LW	ENG	Jason Banton	Wycombe Wanderers	Free	

=== Transfers out ===
Date from	Position	Nationality	Name	To	Fee	Ref.
1 July 2015	CF	HUN	Bálint Bajner	Free agent	Released	
1 July 2015	RB	SLE	Mustapha Dumbuya	Free Agent	Released	
1 July 2015	CF	ENG	Shaun Harrad	Free Agent	Released	
1 July 2015	LB	IRL	Cieron Keane	Free Agent	Released	
1 July 2015	CB	ENG	Brad McGowan	Free Agent	Released	
1 July 2015	CB	ENG	Hayden Mullins	Free Agent	Released	
1 July 2015	GK	GER	Fabian Spiess	Torquay United (Note: Following Spiess' release he joined Torquay United.)	Free transfer	
1 July 2015	CM	NIR	Greg Tempest	Lincoln City (Note: Following Tempest's release he joined Lincoln City.)	Free transfer	
1 July 2015	RW	ENG	Garry Thompson	Wycombe Wanderers	Free transfer	
1 July 2015	DM	FRA	Drissa Traoré	Swindon Town (Note: Following Traoré's release he joined Swindon Town.)	Free transfer	
1 July 2015	CM	ENG	Elliott Whitehouse	FC Halifax Town (Note: Following Whitehouse's release he joined FC Halifax Town.)	Free transfer	
27 July 2015	LB	WAL	Jordan Cranston	Free Agent	Mutual consent	
6 August 2015	CM	ENG	Gary Jones	Southport	Free transfer	
1 September 2015	CF	ENG	Billy Daniels	Nuneaton Town	Mutual consent	

=== Loans in ===
Date from	Position	Nationality	Name	From	Date until	Ref.
24 September 2015	AM	ENG	Jack Barmby	Leicester City	13 November 2015	
25 September 2015	LB	IRL	Alan Sheehan	Bradford City	26 December 2015	
1 February 2016	CB	SCO	Gary MacKenzie	Doncaster Rovers	1 March 2016	
10 March 2016	CB	ENG	Andrew Boyce	Notts County	End of season	

=== Loans out ===
Date from	Position	Nationality	Name	To	Date until	Ref.
11 September 2015	DF	ENG	Jordan Richards	Boston United	13 December 2015	
11 September 2015	MF	ENG	Lartey Sarpong	Boston United	13 December 2015	

== Competitions ==
=== Pre-season friendlies ===
On 20 May 2015, Notts County announced their pre-season schedule which included five friendly matches. On 4 June 2015 a friendly against Arnold Town was announced. On 24 June 2015, Notts County announced a home friendly against Scunthorpe United.

8 July 2015 Friendly	Arnold Town	0–8	Notts County	Arnold
19:30 BST	Stead 10'; De Silva 46', 48', 68', 86'; Campbell 71'; Sarpong 76'; Thompson 81'	Report		Stadium: Eagle Valley

11 July 2015 Friendly	Rolls Royce Leisure	0–9	Notts County	Hucknall
14:00 BST		Report	Valenčič 19'; Spencer 21', 35'; Stead 38', 45'; Adams 41'; Snijders 76'; Sarpong 82'; Trialist 90' (pen.)

15 July 2015 Friendly	Carlton Town	1–4	Notts County	Carlton
19:30 BST	(?)	Report	Stead (?); Campbell (?); De Silva (?); Burke (?)	Stadium: Bill Stokeld Stadium

18 July 2015 Friendly	Alfreton Town	2–3	Notts County	Alfreton
15:00 BST	Goal	Report	Spencer; Trialist; Hollis (?)	Stadium: North Street

21 July 2015 Friendly	Port Vale	2–1	Notts County	Burslem
19:30 BST	(?) (?)	Report	Stead (?)	Stadium: Vale Park

31 July 2015 Friendly	Notts County	1–2	Scunthorpe United	Nottingham
15:00 BST	Jenner 45'	Report	Henderson; Dyche	Stadium: Meadow Lane; Attendance: 1,634 (86 travelling supporters); Referee: Darren Deadman

=== Result by round ===
Round	1	2	3	4	5	6	7	8	9	10	11	12	13	14	15	16	17	18	19	20	21	22	23	24	25	26	27	28	29	30	31	32	33	34	35	36	37	38	39	40	41	42	43	44	45	46
Ground	A	H	A	H	A	H	A	H	H	A	A	H	H	A	A	H	H	H	A	H	A	A	H	H	A	H	A	A	A	H	A	A	H	H	A	H	A	H	A	H	H	A	A	H	A	H
Result	W	L	L	D	L	W	L	W	W	D	L	L	W	D	D	W	L	W	L	W	D	L	D	L	W	L	W	L	W	L	L	L	D	L	L	L	L	D	D	W	W	L	L	L	W	L
Position	6	9	14	16	20	18	19	16	13	13	16	16	15	15	16	15	16	14	15	14	13	16	15	17	16	17	14	18	14	15	16	16	17	17	19	19	19	19	20	18	17	17	17	17	17	17

A = Away; H = Home; W = Win; D = Draw; L = Loss

=== League Two ===
==== League table ====
Pos	Team	Pld	W	D	L	GF	GA	GD	Pts
15	Barnet	46	17	11	18	67	68	−1	62
16	Hartlepool United	46	15	6	25	49	72	−23	51
17	Notts County	46	14	9	23	54	83	−29	51
18	Stevenage	46	11	15	20	52	67	−15	48
19	Yeovil Town	46	11	15	20	43	59	−16	48

Updated to match(es) played on 7 May 2016. Source: BBC Sport
Rules for classification: 1) Points; 2) Goal difference; 3) Number of goals scored

==== Matches ====
On 17 June 2015, the fixtures for the forthcoming season were announced.

8 August 2015 1	Stevenage	0–2	Notts County	Stevenage
15:00 BST		Report	Thompson 35'; Amevor 88'	Stadium: Broadhall Way; Attendance: 3,652; Referee: Graham Salisbury

14 August 2015 2	Notts County	0–2	Mansfield Town	Nottingham
19:45 BST		Report	Clements 36'; Tafazolli 80'	Stadium: Meadow Lane; Attendance: 10,074; Referee: Tim Robinson

18 August 2015 3	Oxford United	3–1	Notts County	Oxford
19:45 BST	O'Dowda 36'; Roofe 49'; Hylton 79'	Report	Audel 21'	Stadium: Kassam Stadium; Attendance: 5,774; Referee: Robert Lewis

22 August 2015 4	Notts County	1–1	Accrington Stanley	Nottingham
15:00 BST	Burke 76'; Noble (red card) 87'	Report	Crooks 90'	Stadium: Meadow Lane; Attendance: 3,825; Referee: Lee Swabey

29 August 2015 5	Morecambe	4–1	Notts County	Morecambe
15:00 BST	Goodall 20'; Mullin 65'; Kenyon 88'; Devitt 90'	Report	Snijders 41'	Stadium: Globe Arena; Attendance: 1,621; Referee: Ross Joyce

12 September 2015 6	Notts County	3–2	Luton Town	Nottingham
15:00 BST	McLeod (yellow card) 10' (goal) 32', 48'; Noble 90+3'; Swerts (yellow card) 15'; Snijders (yellow card) 29'; Amevor (yellow card) 44'; Burke (yellow card) 88'	Report	McGeehan 71'; Smith 76'; Green (yellow card) 34'; Cuthbert (red card) 90+1'	Stadium: Meadow Lane; Attendance: 5,820; Referee: Ben Toner

19 September 2015 7	AFC Wimbledon	2–1	Notts County	Norbiton
15:00 BST	Bulman 85'; Akinfenwa 90'	Report	Hollis 16'	Stadium: Kingsmeadow; Attendance: 3,962; Referee: Andy Davies

22 September 2015 8	Notts County	4–1	Crawley Town	Nottingham
19:45 BST	Edwards 31', 77'; Noble 32', 49' (pen.)	Report	Murphy 24'	Stadium: Meadow Lane; Attendance: 3,267; Referee: Gary Sutton

26 September 2015 9	Notts County	1–0	York City	Nottingham
15:00 BST	McLeod 12'	Report		Stadium: Meadow Lane; Attendance: 5,159; Referee: Eddie Ilderton

29 September 2015 10	Dagenham & Redbridge	1–1	Notts County	Dagenham
19:45 BST	Jones 72'	Report	Campbell 34'	Stadium: Victoria Road; Attendance: 1,327; Referee: Iain Williamson

3 October 2015 11	Leyton Orient	3–1	Notts County	Leyton
15:00 BST	Moore 16', 84'; Simpson 79'	Report	Stead 46'; Smith (yellow card) 72'	Stadium: Mathchroom Stadium; Attendance: 5,193; Referee: Darren England

11 October 2015 12	Notts County	0–2	Plymouth Argyle	Nottingham
14:30 BST	Hewitt (yellow card) 56'; McLeod (yellow card) 65'	Report	Reid 18', 86', (yellow card) 79'	Stadium: Meadow Lane; Attendance: 5,266; Referee: Jeremy Simpson

17 October 2015 13	Notts County	2–0	Yeovil Town	Nottingham
15:00 BST	Edwards (yellow card) 21'; Aborah 55'; McLeod 61'	Report	Arthurworrey (yellow card) 50'	Stadium: Meadow Lane; Attendance: 4,030; Referee: Brendan Malone

20 October 2015 14	Bristol Rovers	0–0	Notts County	Bristol
19:45 BST		Report	Aborah (yellow card) 49'; Amevor (yellow card) 85'	Stadium: Memorial Stadium; Attendance: 6,743; Referee: Steve Martin

24 October 2015 15	Exeter City	1–1	Notts County	Exeter
15:00 BST	Nichols 20'; Tillson (yellow card) 72'; McAllister (yellow card) 90+2'; Olejnik (yellow card) 90+4'	Report	Noble 31'	Stadium: St James Park (Exeter); Attendance: 3,429; Referee: Graham Salisbury

31 October 2015 16	Notts County	2–1	Portsmouth	Nottingham
15:00 GMT	Burke 22'; Sheehan 77'	Report	Lavery 19'; Burgess (yellow card) 21'	Stadium: Meadow Lane; Attendance: 6,917; Referee: Andy Haines

21 November 2015 17	Notts County	1–2	Northampton Town	Nottingham
15:00 GMT	Stead 52'; Burke (yellow card) 34'	Report	McDonald 31'; Moloney 76'; Adams (yellow card) 82'	Stadium: Meadow Lane; Attendance: 5,513; Referee: Andy Davies

24 November 2015 18	Notts County	4–2	Barnet	Nottingham
19:45 GMT	Edwards 6', 78'; Stead 9'; Sheehan 73'	Report	McLean 77'; Gambin 90'; Togwell (yellow card) 28'; Yiadom (yellow card) 32'; Batt (yellow card) 53'; Stacey (yellow card) 57'	Stadium: Meadow Lane; Attendance: 3,098; Referee: Ross Joyce

28 November 2015 19	Cambridge United	3–1	Notts County	Cambridge
15:00 GMT	Corr 50' (pen.); Williamson 77'; Berry 87'; Legge (yellow card) 43'	Report	Campbell 24' (yellow card) 83'; Hewitt (yellow card) 38'; Smith (yellow card) 49'; Sheehan (yellow card) 77'	Stadium: Abbey Stadium; Attendance: 4,596; Referee: Charles Breakspear

12 December 2015 20	Notts County	4–3	Newport County	Nottingham
15:00 GMT	Noble 34', 90+5' (yellow card) 90+6'; McLeod 41', 71'; Sprockel (yellow card) 49'; Burke (yellow card) 72'	Report	Byrne 5'; Rodman 10'; Boden 83'; Partridge (yellow card) 39'; McBurnie (yellow card) 64'	Stadium: Meadow Lane; Attendance: 4,105; Referee: Darren Handley

15 December 2015 21	Wycombe Wanderers	2–2	Notts County	High Wycombe
19:45 GMT	Harriman 44'; Amadi-Holloway 62'	Report	Stead 9' (pen.); Campbell 47'; Noble (red card) 38'; Smith (yellow card) 74'	Stadium: Adams Park; Attendance: 2,886; Referee: Nick Kinseley

19 December 2015 22	Carlisle United	3–0*	Notts County	Preston
15:00 GMT	Grainger 6' (pen.); Ibehre 49', 59'; Wyke (yellow card) 54'	Report	McLeod (yellow card) 34'; Sheehan (yellow card) 43'; Campbell (yellow card) 47'	Stadium: Deepdale; Attendance: 3.336; Referee: Darren Bond

28 December 2015 23	Notts County	2–2	Morecambe	Nottingham
15:00 GMT	McLeod 45', 63'	Report	Miller 8' (yellow card) 72'; Ellison 23'; Dugdale (yellow card) 67'	Stadium: Meadow Lane; Attendance: 4,556; Referee: Rob Lewis

3 January 2016 24	Notts County	2–4	Oxford United	Nottingham
15:00 GMT	Stead 61'; Thompson 76'; Hewitt (yellow card) 2'; Smith (yellow card) 31'; Carroll (yellow card) 44'	Report	Sercombe 45' (pen.); MacDonald 79'; O'Dowda 90'; Roofe 90+2'	Stadium: Meadow Lane; Attendance: 5,877; Referee: Carl Boyeson

16 January 2016 25	Crawley Town	0–1	Notts County	Crawley
15:00 GMT	Harrold (yellow card) 79'	Report	Valencic 63'; Milsom (yellow card) 43'; Campbell (yellow card) 88'	Stadium: Broadfield Stadium; Attendance: 2,074; Referee: Keith Stroud

23 January 2016 26	Notts County	0–2	AFC Wimbledon	Nottingham
15:00 GMT	Milsom (yellow card) 45'	Report	Elliott 9'; Barcham 83'; Rigg (yellow card) 58'	Stadium: Meadow Lane; Attendance: 5,301; Referee: Seb Stockbridge

30 January 2016 27	Luton Town	0–2	Notts County	Luton
15:00 GMT	Lawless (yellow card) 3'; McGeehan (yellow card) 32'	Report	Sheehan 58' (o.g.); Stead 70'; McLeod (yellow card) 60'	Stadium: Kenilworth Road; Attendance: 8.147; Referee: Keith Hill

13 February 2016 28	York City	2–1	Notts County	York
15:00 GMT	Coulson 24', (yellow card) 51'; Fewster 39'	Report	Šatka 63' (o.g.); MacKenzie (yellow card) 28'; McLeod (yellow card) 66'; Hollis (yellow card) 74'	Stadium: Bootham Crescent; Attendance: 3,811; Referee: Mark Heywood

16 February 2016 29	Hartlepool United	2–3	Notts County	Hartlepool
19:45 GMT	Gray 62'; Paynter 66'	Report	Stead 4', 80'; Noble 14'	Stadium: Victoria Park; Attendance: 3,433; Referee: David Webb

20 February 2016 30	Notts County	0–1	Leyton Orient	Nottingham
15:00 GMT		Report	Brisley 76'; Nolan (yellow card) 64'	Stadium: Meadow Lane; Attendance: 4,878; Referee: Andy Woolmer

23 February 2016 31	Accrington Stanley	3–2	Notts County	Accrington
19:45 GMT	Kee 14' (yellow card) 78'; Boco 21', 51'	Report	Murray 72'; Campbell 81'	Stadium: Crown Ground; Attendance: 1,215; Referee: Eddie Ilderton

27 February 2016 32	Plymouth Argyle	1–0	Notts County	Plymouth
15:00 GMT	Carey 47'; Sawyer (yellow card) 47'	Report	Carroll (yellow card) 90+8'	Stadium: Home Park; Attendance: 7,642; Referee: Iain Williamson

1 March 2016 33	Notts County	0–0	Dagenham & Redbridge	Nottingham
19:45 GMT		Report		Stadium: Meadow Lane; Attendance: 3,147; Referee: Mark Haywood

5 March 2016 34	Notts County	0–2	Bristol Rovers	Nottingham
15:00 GMT	Audel (yellow card) 40'	Report	Montaño 43'; Brown 50'	Stadium: Meadow Lane; Attendance: 5,052; Referee: Tim Robinson

12 March 2016 35	Yeovil Town	1–0	Notts County	Yeovil
15:00 GMT	Zoko 50'; Laird (yellow card) 33'; Dickson (yellow card) 37'	Report	Noble (yellow card) 71'; Thompson (yellow card) 77'; Campbell (yellow card) 90+4'	Stadium: Huish Park; Attendance: 3,588; Referee: Gavin Ward

19 March 2016 36	Notts County	1–4	Exeter City	Nottingham
15:00 BST	Stead (yellow card) 20'; McLeod 35'; Thompson (yellow card) 37'	Report	Stockley 8'; Taylor 68'; Ribeiro 71'; Watkins 78'	Stadium: Meadow Lane; Attendance: 3,813; Referee: Tony Harrington

25 March 2016 37	Portsmouth	4–0	Notts County	Portsmouth
15:00 GMT	Bennett 44', 49'; Hollands (yellow card) 45+1'; Burgess 81'; McNulty 90+1'	Report	Aborah (yellow card) 5'; Milsom (yellow card) 40'; Thompson (yellow card) 45+3'; Smith (yellow card) 74'; McLeod (yellow card) 90'	Stadium: Fratton Park; Attendance: 16,670; Referee: Michael Bull

28 March 2016 38	Notts County	0–0	Wycombe Wanderers	Nottingham
15:00 BST		Report		Stadium: Meadow Lane; Attendance: 4,452; Referee: Carl Boyeson

2 April 2016 39	Northampton Town	2–2	Notts County	Northampton
15:00 BST	Holmes 32', 76' (pen.); O'Toole (yellow card) 72'	Report	Audel 36'; Stead 72' (pen.); Edwards (yellow card) 79'; Noble (yellow card) 83'	Stadium: Sixfields Stadium; Attendance: 6,428; Referee: Ben Toner

9 April 2016 40	Notts County	1–0	Stevenage	Nottingham
15:00 BST	Audel (yellow card) 36'; Stead (yellow card) 53'; Noble 80'; Atkinson (yellow card) 88'	Report	Harrison (yellow card) 71'; Gorman (yellow card) 79'	Stadium: Meadow Lane; Attendance: 4,172; Referee: Mark Heywood

12 April 2016 41	Notts County	1–0	Hartlepool United	Nottingham
19:45 BST	Aborah (yellow card) 6'; Stead 55'	Report	Magnay (yellow card) 44'; Hawkins (yellow card) 70'	Stadium: Meadow Lane; Attendance: 3,597; Referee: Darren England

16 April 2016 42	Mansfield Town	5–0	Notts County	Mansfield
15:00 BST	Green 6', 60'; Chapman 57'; Lambe 67'; Rose 83'	Report	Aborah (yellow card) 25'; Stead (yellow card) 48'	Stadium: Field Mill; Attendance: 6,357; Referee: Geoff Eltringham

19 April 2016 43	Barnet	3–1	Notts County	London
19:45 BST	Akinde 47' (pen.); Randall (yellow card) 55', (goal) 57'; Yiadom 63'	Report	Stead 6' (pen.); Audel (yellow card) 57'; Hewitt (yellow card) 86'	Stadium: The Hive Stadium; Attendance: 1,322; Referee: Oliver Langford

April 2016 44	Notts County	1–2	Cambridge United	Nottingham
15:00 BST	Atkinson (yellow card) 13'; Hollis 39'; Smith (yellow card) 5'; Hewitt (yellow card) 73'; Noble (red card) 81'	Report	Berry 4'; Williamson 54'; Furlong (yellow card) 65'; Dunne (yellow card) 75'; Spencer (yellow card) 90+4'	Stadium: Meadow Lane; Attendance: 4,450; Referee: Ross Joyce

30 April 2016 45	Newport County	0–1	Notts County	Newport
15:00 BST	Morgan (yellow card) 33'	Report	Snijders 39'	Stadium: Rodney Parade; Attendance: 4,903; Referee: Nick Kinseley

7 May 2016 46	Notts County	0–5	Carlisle United	Nottingham
15:00 BST	Audel (yellow card) 84'; Hollis (yellow card) 87'	Report	Gilliead 4'; Grainger 28'; Ibehre 40', 54'; Wyke 80'	Stadium: Rodney Parade; Attendance: 5,405; Referee: Fred Graham

- The Carlisle game was relocated due to Storm Desmond
- The Hartlepool game on 16 February was rearranged from Boxing day

=== League Cup ===
On 16 June 2015, the first round draw was made, Notts County were drawn away against Huddersfield Town. In the second round, Notts County were drawn away to Aston Villa.

11 August 2015 First round	Huddersfield Town	1–2	Notts County	Huddersfield
19:45 BST	Wallace 35'	Report	Noble 42', 56'; Swerts (red card) 70'	Stadium: John Smith's Stadium; Attendance: TBA; Referee: Jeremy Simpson

25 August 2015 Second round	Aston Villa	5–3 (a.e.t.)	Notts County	Birmingham
19:45 BST	Traoré 24'; Sinclair 50', 78' (pen.), 99'; Bennett 111'	Report	Snijders 16'; Stead 45' (pen.); Burke 56'	Stadium: Villa Park

=== FA Cup ===
6 November 2015 First round	Salford City	2-0	Notts County	Salford
19:55 BST	Webber (46), Allen (75)			Stadium: Moor Lane

=== Football League Trophy ===
On 8 August 2015, live on Soccer AM the draw for the first round of the Football League Trophy was drawn by Toni Duggan and Alex Scott. In the draw for the second round, held on 5 September 2015, Notts County were drawn away at Sheffield United.

1 September 2015 First round	Notts County	3–1	Mansfield Town	Nottingham
19:45 BST	McLeod 52'; Edwards 79'; Stead 90'	Report	Westcarr 90' (pen.)	Stadium: Meadow Lane; Attendance: 2,696; Referee: Richard Clark

06/10/15 Second round	Sheffield United	5 - 1	Notts County	Sheffield
19:45	Baxter 20' (pen.); Done 23'; Baxter 36' (pen.); Scougall 67'; Adams 72' (pen.)		Stead 61'	Stadium: Bramall Lane; Attendance: 5,497; Referee: CARL BOYESON
