= Chuks Aneke =

English footballer (born 1993)

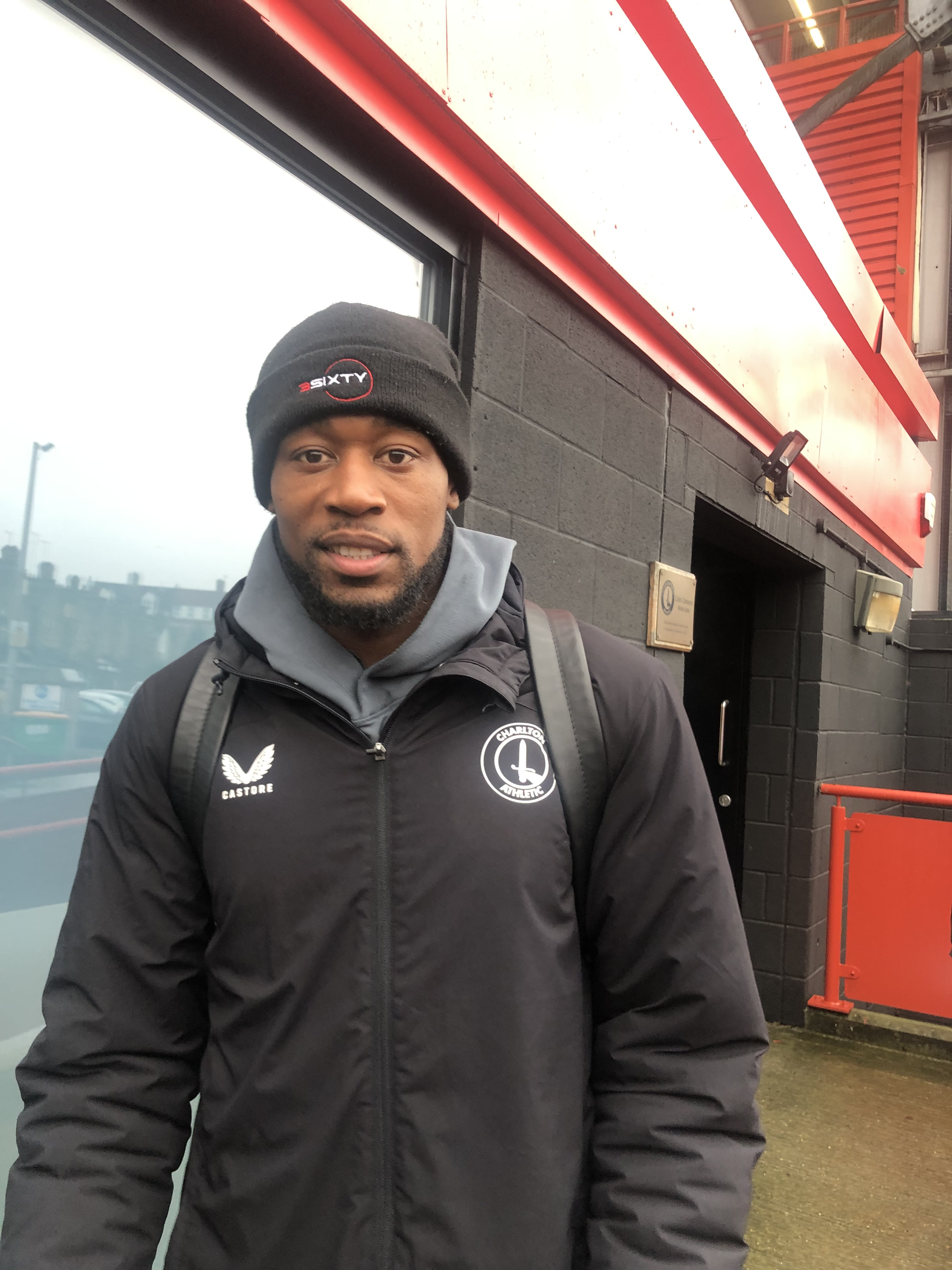
- Aneke in 2025

Personal information
- Full name: Chukwuemeka Ademola Amachi Aneke
- Date of birth: 3 July 1993 (age 33)
- Place of birth: Newham, London, England
- Height: 6 ft 3 in (1.91 m)
- Position: Striker

Youth career
- 2001–2010: Arsenal

Senior career*
| Years | Team | Apps | (Gls) |
| 2010–2014 | Arsenal | 0 | (0) |
| 2011–2012 | → Stevenage (loan) | 6 | (0) |
| 2012 | → Preston North End (loan) | 7 | (1) |
| 2012–2013 | → Crewe Alexandra (loan) | 30 | (6) |
| 2013–2014 | → Crewe Alexandra (loan) | 40 | (14) |
| 2014–2016 | Zulte Waregem | 41 | (4) |
| 2016–2019 | Milton Keynes Dons | 84 | (30) |
| 2019–2021 | Charlton Athletic | 58 | (16) |
| 2021–2022 | Birmingham City | 18 | (2) |
| 2022–2025 | Charlton Athletic | 65 | (8) |
| 2025–2026 | Shrewsbury Town | 13 | (1) |
| Total | | 362 | (82) |

International career
| 2008 | England U16 | 5 | (0) |
| 2009–2010 | England U17 | 7 | (3) |
| 2010 | England U18 | 1 | (0) |
| 2011 | England U19 | 1 | (0) |
- * Club domestic league appearances and goals

Chukwuemeka Ademola Amachi "Chuks" Aneke (born 3 July 1993) is an English retired professional footballer who played as a forward. He is currently a scout for Shewsbury Town.

Aneke began his career as a youngster with Arsenal, and spent time on loan with Football League clubs Stevenage, Preston North End and Crewe Alexandra before leaving for two seasons in Belgian football with Zulte Waregem. Returning to England in 2016, he spent three seasons with Milton Keynes Dons and two with Charlton Athletic before signing briefly for Birmingham City in 2021 before returning to Charlton Athletic in 2022. After leaving Charlton Athletic in 2025, Aneke had a brief spell at Shrewsbury Town.

He was capped for England from under-16 to under-19 levels.

== Club career ==
=== Arsenal ===
Aneke joined Arsenal in 2001 at the age of seven, and progressed through the ranks. He made his reserve-team debut against Maidenhead United in a pre-season friendly on 28 July 2009. Aneke and fellow academy player Benik Afobe were offered the chance to visit FC Barcelona's training base with view to signing for them. Amid to his future, he contributed to Arsenal’s U18 win against Nottingham Forest’s U18 to help the club retain their Premier Academy League title. However, Aneke signed a professional contract with Arsenal in July 2010.

Ahead of the 2011–12 season, Aneke signed a contract extension with the club. He scored for Arsenal's reserve side in friendly victories against Woking, Hastings United, and Stevenage, and finally made his competitive first-team debut for Arsenal in the club's 3–1 League Cup victory against Shrewsbury Town on 20 September 2011, coming on as a 90th-minute substitute in the match.

After thirteen seasons, Aneke was released by Arsenal in June 2014 at the expiry of his contract.

==== Stevenage (loan) ====
Aneke joined League One club Stevenage on 22 November, on loan until 22 January 2012. He made his debut four days later, playing 57 minute of a goalless draw at home to Walsall before being replaced by Darius Charles. Aneke was sent off for a high-footed challenge in a 1–0 defeat to Leyton Orient on 2 January 2012, resulting in a three-game suspension. It was later announced that Aneke would remain on loan at Stevenage until March, with a view to extending the loan until the end of the 2011–12 season. As a result, he didn’t make another appearance for the club until on 25 February 2012 against Charlton Athletic, coming on as a 75th-minute substitute, in the remaining 15 minutes of the game, losing 2–0.

Aneke returned to his parent club on 5 March, and on the same day scored in a 2–0 reserve victory against Chelsea.

==== Preston North End (loan) ====
Aneke joined another League One club, Preston North End, on 22 March on loan until the end of the season, linking up with Graham Westley who had managed him at Stevenage. He scored his first senior goal on his debut two days later in a 1–1 draw with Bury. He made two more starts and four substitute appearances without scoring in what remained of the season.

==== Crewe Alexandra (first loan spell) ====
On 7 September 2012, Aneke joined Crewe Alexandra of League One on a month's loan.

He made his debut the next day as a second-half substitute against Tranmere Rovers and played the rest of the match, as the club drew 2–2. Aneke started the following fixture, away at Stevenage, and set up a goal for A-Jay Leitch-Smith to score his second goal of the game, just two minutes after the first one but he received a second-half red card for a "two-footed lunge" so had to serve a three-match suspension.After returning to the starting line–up against Oldham Athletic on 2 October 2012, Aneke scored his first goal for "The Alex", in a 2–1 win against Hartlepool United four days later. After adding two more goals for Crewe Alexandra, his loan extension with the club was extended for a month.

He became a first team regular before losing his place in the starting eleven and was placed on the substitute bench by December because of his poor performances. On 17 December 2012, Aneke extended his loan spell with Crewe Alexandra for another month. He later scored two more goals throughout January, including a goal against Bradford City in the EFL Trophy that saw him nominated for the Johnstone’s Paint Trophy’s latest ‘Ultimate Finish’ competition. The loan was gradually extended until the end of the season.

However, he found himself pushing for a first team place in the starting eleven, which saw him place on the substitute bench. Despite this, he helped Crewe reach the Football League Trophy Final, started the match, and was involved in the build-up to the second goal as Crewe beat Southend United 2–0 at Wembley. Aneke scored on 23 April 2013 and 27 April 2013 against Sheffield United and Walsall respectively. After the match, manager Davis praised his performance, saying: "He has that quality and shown that he has that type of goal in his locker. I thought Chuks was excellent in behind the striker, where he can play those passes. He looked quick and strong for such a big guy and was a real powerhouse for us." At the end of the 2012–13 season, Aneke scored six goals from 30 league appearances, of which 21 were as a starter.

==== Crewe Alexandra (second loan spell) ====
Aneke returned to Crewe on loan for the first half of the 2013–14 season

He made his second debut for the club, coming on as a 69th-minute substitute, in a 3–3 draw against Rotherham United in the opening game of the season. In a follow–up match, Aneke scored his first goal for Crewe Alexandra in his second spell, in a 3–2 loss against Bury in the first round of the EFL Cup. He then scored the only goal of the game, in a 1–0 win against Accrington Stanley in the first round of the EFL Trophy. Since re–joining the club, Aneke continued to establish himself in the first team, rotating in the midfield position, though he formed a striking partnership with Mathias Pogba, Byron Moore, Tom Hitchcock and Uche Ikpeazu. However, Aneke spent two months, struggling to score goals, with only scoring two goals all leading up to November.

Despite this, his stay was extended to the end of the campaign. Aneke ended up his goal drought when he came on as a 78th-minute substitute and scored the only goal of the game, in a 1–0 win against Crawley Town. This was followed up by setting up the opening goal of the season and scoring the equalising goal, in a 2–2 draw against Coventry City. Aneke then scored four times throughout February, including a brace victory against Sheffield United. After the match, local newspaper Crewe Chronicle praised his performances. His goal scoring form led manager Davis hoping to sign the player on a permanent basis, calling him "unplayable". He then added five more goals throughout March, including two braces against Peterborough United and Gillingham.

Once again, manager Davis praised Aneke’s performance, believing that the player has improved at Crewe Alexandra on two separate interviews. However, Aneke was sent–off in the 45th minute "for leading with an alleged elbow on the stroke of half-time", in a 1–0 loss against Wolves on 12 April 2014. After serving a three match suspension, he returned to the first team, coming on as a 73rd-minute substitute against Preston North End and helped the club win 2–1 to ensure the Crewe’s finish just two places and four points above the relegation zone in League One.

Aneke finished as the club's top scorer, with 14 goals from 40 league matches, 16 from 44 in all competitions. For his performance, he was nominated for Crewe’s Player of the Year award but lost out to Matt Tootle.

=== Zulte Waregem ===
On 21 June 2014, Belgian Pro League club Zulte Waregem announced the signing of Aneke on a three-year contract following his release by Arsenal. Upon joining the club, he said: "I am very impressed with the first training. I want to do well here and work hard for the team. 'I am a player who likes to play around, create chances and score. I have to, because I am an attacking midfielder who prefers to play in the ten position. I knew Thorgan Hazard, but I am a very different type of footballer than him. Of course I hope to score as many goals as he did. I chose Zulte Waregem because I think Belgian football suits my playing style. I didn't know Essevee, but I did know the big clubs like Anderlecht and Standard Liège."

==== 2014–15 season ====
Aneke made his debut for Zulte Waregem in the first leg of the UEFA Europa League Second Round against Zawisza Bydgoszcz and started the whole game, in a 2–1 win. He scored his first goal for the club in the return leg and set up the opening goal of the game, in a 3–1 win to help Zulte Waregem advance to the next round. Since joining the club, Aneke became involved in the first team, where he was rotated in and out of the starting line–up, playing in attacking and centre–midfield positions.

Aneke then scored his first goal for Zulte Waregem, scoring an equalising goal just a minute left to full time, in a 1–1 draw against Royal Excel Mouscron on 20 August 2014. After the match, he said scoring his first goal for the club gave him confidence. Aneke added two more goals in December, coming against Lierse and Royal Excel Mouscron. However, he found himself being booked that saw him suspended for the combination of three matches. Despite this, Aneke went on to make thirty–eight appearances and scoring four times in all competitions. Reflecting on his first season at Zulte Waregem, he said: "Before, I always played on ten (along with the strikers, ed). The coach decides. I'm always happy when I'm on the team. But it could be better. As a team we can do better, individually I can do better too. But it could be better. As a team we can do better, individually I can do better too."

==== 2015–16 season ====
Aneke made three starts in the first three league matches of the 2015–16 season. He said: "I have indeed come here to develop myself further. This is part of football and as a professional you have to deal with it and make the best of it. I already feel that it makes me a better footballer and I also think that this role suits me. I certainly don't feel like I have to do the dirty work now, quite the contrary." However, Aneke suffered a tear in his meniscus that saw him out for a month.

He made his return from injury, coming on as a late substitute, in a 4–2 win against Westerlo on 25 September 2015. Since returning from injury, Aneke made seven more starts, playing in the defensive midfield position and centre–midfield position. He scored his first goal of the season, scoring the last minute goal of the game, in a 4–0 win against Sint-Truidense on 28 October 2015. Aneke scored his second goal of the season, in a 2–2 draw against Royal Excel Mouscron on 6 November 2015. However, he suffered a knee injury and was eventually out for the rest of the 2015–16 season. While out with a knee injury, Aneke was linked with a move to English club and OH Leuven in the January transfer window but he ended up staying at the club. At the end of the 2015–16 season, Aneke went on to make twelve appearances and scoring two times in all competitions.

Ahead of the 2016–17 season, it was expected that Aneke would be leaving Zulte Waregem. On 14 July 2016, his contract at the club was left by mutual consent. Over the following two seasons, which were interrupted by injury, he made a total of 50 appearances in all competitions, scoring six goals. During his time at Zulte Waregem, Aneke said playing abroad was a "positive experience", quoting: "I went there and didn't know what to expect. I played quite a bit in the first season, but got injured in the second at a vital time, very early on in the season. But it just didn't work out there. If you look at foreign leagues like Belgium and Holland, a lot of players go there and get moves to higher levels. It's all football, and there's always someone watching, like a scout. But England isn't the only place in the world, and playing in Belgium was an experience."

=== Milton Keynes Dons ===
On 2 August 2016, while still recovering from a knee operation during the previous season, Aneke joined League One club Milton Keynes Dons, signing a one-year deal with an option of a second year. Upon joining the club, he said: "I’m delighted. This is a great club – I’ve made a lot of appearances in League One, so I’ve known about the manager, the staff and the stadium for a long time and I’m delighted to be here. There was an opportunity to come here before I went to Belgium, so I’ve known about the Club’s interest since then. Now it’s happened, so I’m delighted." Aneke was given a number twenty–five when he joined Milton Keynes Dons.

==== 2016–17 season ====
However, Aneke continued to be on the out through injury in the first three months at the club and was willing to go on a rehab, even after signing for Milton Keynes Dons. While recovering, manager Karl Robinson believed that Aneke could be the best signing for the club once he recover. Aneke made his league debut for Milton Keynes Dons, as an 84th-minute substitute in a 3–2 defeat at home to Chesterfield. After the match, caretaker manager Richie Barker said: "We need to lower our expectations on him at the moment. He can only really come on for 10 minutes or so. He has been out for a year, so we need to take the pressure off him. He has a long, long way to go. We'd like him to be as fit as possible as quick as possible, but we're well aware he hasn't played for so long. It's not just building him up to it, but how he can deal afterwards too. It takes preparation and recovery. I did it as a different option and to give him a boost. He's been excellent in training, but he's not the answer at the moment and I don't want that pressure put on him."

Since returning from injury, Aneke became involved in the first team, rotating in and out of the starting line–up. He scored his first goals for the club with a brace in a 5–3 home win over Northampton Town on 21 January 2017. Aneke scored twice against Peterborough United a week later, which he was nominated for February’s EFL League One Goal of the Month and eventually won Milton Keynes Dons’ Goal of the Season. Both of his performances resulted in him being named EFL Team of the Week twice.

However during a 2–2 draw against Bradford City on 28 February 2017, Aneke came on as a 65th-minute substitute and played 21 minutes before he suffered a hamstring injury and was substituted in the 85th minute as a result. It was announced on 10 March 2017 by the club’s website that Aneke would be loss for the rest of the 2016–17 season. He went on to make eighteen appearances and scoring four times in all competitions. When the 2016–17 season was concluded, Milton Keynes Dons opted to trigger their option of a contract extension that would ensure Aneke remained under contract for another season.

==== 2017–18 season ====
Ahead of the 2017–18 season, Aneke switched number shirt to ten following the departure of Ben Reeves. On 17 August 2017, Aneke signed an extended contract keeping him at the club until June 2019. He spent the first month in the 2017–18 season, continuing to recover from his hamstring injury. Aneke made his return from injury, playing for Milton Keynes Dons’ reserve side against Southend United on 5 September 2017 and scored in a 5–4 win. On 30 September 2017, he made his return to the first team, coming on as an 83rd-minute substitute, in a 2–0 win against Bury.

Since returning from injury, Aneke became a first team regular, rotating in playing both midfield positions and striker positions. He scored his first goal of the season, scoring the opening goal of the game, in a 1–1 draw against Walsall on 17 October 2017. Aneke added three goals by the end of November, scoring against Hyde United, Fleetwood Town and Doncaster Rovers. He added another three goals by the end of December, scoring two goals on 16 December 2017 and 23 December 2017 against Scunthorpe United and Rotherham United respectively before scoring the winning goal against Peterborough United seven days later on 30 December 2017.

However during a 2–1 loss against Northampton Town on 20 January 2018, Aneke came on as a 59th-minute substitute and played 31 minutes before he was sent–off at the last minute after being "fouled on the edge of the box, sparking a fight", resulting in his sending off. As a result, Aneke served a three match suspension. He made his return from suspension, starting a match against Oldham Athletic on 13 February 2018, only for him to be substituted in the 15th minute after suffering an injury and was substituted, as the club loss 1–0. After missing two matches through injury, Aneke made his return against Fleetwood Town on 24 February 2018 and set up the equalising goal for Milton Keynes Dons to draw 1–1. Two weeks later on 13 March 2018, he set up two goals to help the club win 3–2 win against Rotherham United, giving their first win since December. In a follow–up match against Bury, Aneke scored twice, both coming from penalties, in a 2–1 win. Two weeks later on 29 March 2018, he scored his tenth goal of the season, in a 2–1 win against Gillingham. Having regained his first team place for the rest of the 2017–18 season, Aneke, however, was unable to help Milton Keynes Dons avoid relegation to League Two after the club loss 2–0 against Scunthorpe United on 28 April 2018. At the end of the 2017–18 season, he went on to make thirty–five appearances and scoring ten times in all competitions.

==== 2018–19 season ====
The first month of the 2018–19 season, however, saw Aneke out, due to an injury he sustained in the pre–season. At the same time, Aneke was linked with a loan move to Bolton Wanderers in the summer transfer window, but he ended up staying at Milton Keynes Dons once it was closed and returned to the first team squad.

Aneke made his first appearance of the 2018–19 season against Peterborough United in the EFL Trophy and scored twice, as the club won 6–5 on penalties following a 3–3 draw. This was followed up by scoring in a 1–1 draw against Forest Green Rovers. Since returning to the first team, he continued to establish himself in the first team, forming a striking partnership with Kieran Agard and Rhys Healey. His goal scoring form continued when Aneke scored four goals on 29 September 2018, 2 October 2018, 6 October 2018 and 13 October 2018 against Tranmere Rovers, Port Vale, Cheltenham Town and Cambridge United respectively. Shortly after, he was awarded Milton Keynes Dons’ Player of the Month for September. For his performance, Aneke was nominated for October’s League Two Player of the Month, but he did not win.

Aneke scored on 3 November 2018 and 17 November 2018 against Crawley Town and Macclesfield Town respectively. However, during a 2–0 win against Morecambe on 27 November 2018, he suffered an injury and was substituted in the 57th minute. After being out for three weeks, Aneke came on as second half substitute against Colchester United on 22 December 2018 as the club loss 1–0. He scored on 26 December 2018, 29 December 2018 and 1 January 2019 against Cheltenham Town, Northampton Town and Cambridge United respectively. Aneke continued to be linked a move away from Milton Keynes Dons in the January transfer window, but he ended up staying at the club once again.

Since returning from injury, Aneke was involved in the first team for the rest of the 2018–19 season, but he found himself rotating in and out of the starting line–up. The next three months saw Aneke scoring five more goals, including two goals against Newport County (scoring once within a week) and Yeovil Town, which he later earned EFL Team of the Week and Milton Keynes Dons’ Goal of the Month for March respectively. Aneke eventually won the club’s Goal of the Season at Milton Keynes Dons’ award ceremony. On 15 April 2019, Aneke was the subject of an alleged racist social media post. Four days later on 19 April 2019, he came on as a 60th-minute substitute and scored the second goal of the game, in a 2–1 win against Notts County. After the match, manager Paul Tisdale praised Aneke’s handling of the issue. He, once again, was awarded the club’s Goal of the Month for April. In the last game of the season against Mansfield Town, Aneke started the whole game and he was instrumental in helping Milton Keynes Dons achieve promotion back to League One at the first attempt, in a 1–0 win. At the end of the 2018–19 season, Aneke went on to make 41 appearances and scoring 19 goals in all competitions.

Shortly after, he was offered a new contract extension by the club, along with goal scorer, Kieran Agard. After a month on negotiations, it was reported on 27 June 2019 by local newspaper Milton Keynes Citizen that Aneke declined an offer of a contract extension with Milton Keynes Dons and left the club. Shortly after joining Charlton Athletic, local newspaper Milton Keynes Citizen said his departure as a "big hole".

=== Charlton Athletic ===
Aneke joined newly promoted Championship club Charlton Athetic on a free transfer effective from 1 July. Upon joining the club, he was given a number ten shirt.

==== 2019–20 season ====
However, Aneke missed the opening game of the season, due to a hamstring injury that he sustained in the pre–season friendly match against Aston Villa. Aneke returned to the starting line–up and scored on his debut for Charlton Athletic in a 3–1 win over Stoke City on 10 August 2019. After missing one match due to illness, Aneke returned to the first team, coming on as a 63rd-minute substitute, and won a penalty, in a 2–0 win against Reading on 31 August 2019. His return was short–lived when he suffered a groin injury and was out for two matches.

On 23 October 2019, Aneke returned to the first team, coming on as a 72nd-minute substitute, in a 2–1 loss against Bristol City. On 4 November 2019, he scored for the club’s reserve match, in a 2–2 draw against Millwall U23 side. However, during the match, Aneke suffered a muscle injuries and was out for two months. Despite the injuries, he found himself rotating in and out of the starting line–up, due to facing new competitions in the striker position and his playing time coming from the substitute bench. On 20 January 2020, Aneke returned from injury for Charlton Athletic’s reserve match against Swansea City U23 and scored a hat–trick, in a 4–2 win. He scored again for the club’s reserve team, in a 3–3 draw against Watford U23 on 5 February 2020.

The combination of three-month interruption because of the COVID-19 pandemic and the dropping of Lyle Taylor, Chris Solly and David Davis gave Aneke more playing time, playing the remaining nine matches of the 2019–20 season. He made his first appearance in seven months, coming on as a 72nd-minute substitute, in a 1–0 win against Hull City on 20 June 2020. Following this, Aneke received a handful of first team appearances for the club towards the end of the 2019–20 season. However, he was unable to help the club avoid relegation after losing 4–0 against Leeds United in the last game of the season. At the end of the 2019–20 season, he went on to make twenty–one appearances and scoring once in all competitions.

==== 2020–21 season ====
Ahead of the 2020–21 season, Charlton Athletic manager Lee Bowyer expected Aneke to avoid injuries if he wanted more playing time. Despite suffering from a minor knocks, Aneke made a start for the match against Swindon Town in the first round of the League Cup and set up the club’s second goal of the game before he scored the late consolation, In a 3–1 win. Following this, Aneke was nominated for the Carabao Cup goal of the round. After missing two matches due to being tested positive for COVID-19, he returned to the first team, coming on as a 72nd-minute substitute, in a 0–0 draw against Sunderland on 3 October 2020. Aneke scored the only goal of the game, in a 1–0 win against Blackpool on 20 October 2020. After the match, he said: "I’m doing well now thankfully, I just want to get a run in the team. I’ve had injury problems while I’ve been here. I know what I can do in this team, I want to score goals and increase my output with assists and goals like today. It was a great cross. Alfie’s poked it back in and I’m in the six-yard box and I’ve just headed it, so I’m delighted with that." After missing two matches through a groin injury, he scored on his return, in a 2–0 win against Portsmouth on 31 October 2020. Aneke scored on 21 November 2020 and 24 November 2020 against Gillingham and Burton Albion respectively. He, once again, scored on 12 December 2020 and 19 December 2020 against AFC Wimbledon and Swindon Town respectively. Since returning from injury, Aneke was involved in every match until he received a suspension for accumulating five yellow cards.

After a serving a one match suspension, Aneke made his return to the first team, coming on as a second-half substitute, in a 2–0 loss against Accrington Stanley on 8 January 2021. In a follow–up match, he scored twice and set up the Charlton Athletic’s fourth goal of the game, in a 4–4 draw against Rochdale on 12 January 2021. On 23 January 2021, Aneke scored his tenth goal of the season, in a 2–2 draw against Swindon Town. He scored on 6 February 2021 and 13 February 2021 against Rochdale and Gillingham respectively. During the match against Gillingham, Aneke received a red card for a second bookable offence and served a one match suspension. After serving a one match suspension, he returned to the first team, coming on as a 56th-minute substitute, in a 2–1 loss against Burton Albion on 23 February 2021. In a follow–up match against Blackpool, Aneke was sent–off in the 85th minute for a foul on Daniel Ballard, in a 3–0 loss. After the match, his red card was overturned, allowing him to play in the next match against Wigan Athletic, which he scored.

Despite his return to the first team, he continued to suffer injuries on two occasions towards the end of the 2020–21 season. After missing two matches due to a groin injury, Aneke scored on his return, coming on as a 76th-minute substitute, in a 6–0 win against Plymouth Argyle on 20 April 2021. He scored on 1 May 2021 and 4 May 2021 against Accrington Stanley and Lincoln City respectively. At the end of the 2020–21 season, Aneke went on to make forty–one appearances and scoring sixteen times in all competitions. He went on to finish third place for the club’s Player of the Season. Nevertheless, Aneke’s goal against Burton Albion won him Charlton Athletic’s Goal of the Season.

Following this, Aneke was offered a new contract by Charlton Athletic. Amid to his future at the club, he was linked with a move to Sheffield Wednesday, Coventry City and Middlesbrough.

=== Birmingham City ===
Aneke followed his former manager Lee Bowyer to Championship club Birmingham City, where he signed a two-year deal effective from 1 July. Upon joining the club, Aneke was given a number fifteen shirt.

He made his debut in the starting eleven for Birmingham's 1–0 win against Colchester United in the EFL Cup first round, and scored his first goal to complete a 5–0 league win away to Luton Town on 21 August. However, Aneke found his playing time, coming from the substitute bench, due to the in-form of Scott Hogan, Troy Deeney and Jérémie Bela. In what turned out to be his last appearance for the club against Queens Park Rangers on 2 January 2022, he came on as a 67th-minute substitute and scored six minutes later, in a 2–1 loss. By the time Aneke departed Birmingham City in the January transfer window, he made twenty–one appearances and scoring two times in all competitions.

=== Return to Charlton Athletic ===
On 14 January 2022, after just half a season at Birmingham City, Aneke rejoined League One side Charlton Athletic on an undisclosed fee, signing a three–year contract.

==== 2021–22 season ====
The following day, Aneke scored on his second debut for the club, scoring a last minute equaliser with a header against Cheltenham Town. In a match against Hartlepool United in the last 16 of the EFL Trophy, he was one of the players to have their penalty successfully converted, as Charlton Athletic lost 5–4. Aneke scored his second goal for the club, in a 2–1 loss against Bolton Wanderers on 8 February 2022. Shortly after, he, however, suffered a muscle complaints sustained during the match. As a result, Aneke was out for two months. On 15 April 2022, Aneke made his return to the first team, coming as a 75th-minute substitute and scored a header six minutes later, in a 3–2 loss. A week later on 23 April 2022, he scored his fourth goal of the season for Charlton Athletic, in a 2–0 win against Shrewsbury Town. At the end of the 2021–22 season, Aneke went on to make nine appearances and scoring four times in all competitions. He reflected on his injury frustrating season at the club this season, describing it as a "personal battle".

==== 2022–23 season ====
During a 3–0 win against Welling United on 22 July 2022, however, Aneke suffered an injury and was substituted in the 66th minute as a result. Charlton Athletic’s manager Ben Garner revealed that he suffered a calf injury and his subsequent scans that saw him out for three months. This led Garner commented on Aneke’s situation, saying: "It’s been a difficult start for Chuks and he’s had difficult moments throughout his career. First and foremost I want him to be in a good place as a person, which it looks like he is now. He’s more positive. He can see the finishing line in sight. We want to get him back in the fold, back in a good place but, most importantly, people need to understand these are people. You get things thrown at players about being injured and that they don’t care – not the case at all. He’s desperate to get back and get playing."

Aneke made his return to the first team against Exeter City on 11 October 2022, coming on as an 82nd minute and scored his first goal of the season to win 4–2, ending the club’s eight-game winless run. After the match, manager Garner praised his performance and scoring on his return. Following his return from injury, he found his playing time, coming from the substitute bench. He scored on 5 November 2022 and 8 November 2022 in the FA Cup and EFL Cup matches against Coalville Town and Stevenage respectively. On 21 December 2022, Aneke suffered a hamstring injury after coming on as a substitute in the 63rd minute, only to be substituted four minutes later, as Charlton Athletic beat Brighton & Hove Albion 4–3 on a penalty shootout following a 0–0 draw. After the match, he had a scan on his hamstring injury, which it turned out to have suffer a muscle damage.

After being out for two months, Aneke made his return from injury, coming on as a 66th-minute substitute, in a 2–1 loss against Fleetwood Town on 11 February 2023. However, Aneke’s return was short–lived for the second time in the 2022–23 season when he suffered another hamstring injury after coming on as a substitute in the 57th minute, only to be substituted in the 81st minute, as the club loss 1–0 against Sheffield Wednesday on 25 February 2023. After a surgery, it was announced that Aneke would be out for the rest of the 2022–23 season. At the end of the 2022–23 season, he went on to make eighteen appearances and scoring three times in all competitions.

==== 2023–24 season ====
The start of the 2023–24 season saw Aneke absent from the first team, due to a calf injury that he sustained during Charlton Athletic’s pre–season campaign. On 16 September 2023, he made his return to the first team from injury, coming on as a 76th-minute substitute, in a 2–1 win against Stevenage. After the match, Aneke said: "It was really good to be back out there on Saturday. I’ve had a lot of time inside the physio room working hard and I felt sharp. It was great to have an impact on the game. The gaffer told me to just put myself about and that’s what I tried to do: get on and be a physical presence. Even when I was warming up at the beginning of the game I could hear the fans singing my name. It definitely helps and it’s amazing to have that support. I’ve had a hard time with injuries so for the fans to support me like that means a lot. When the fans are behind you it gives you that extra 10%. I want to be on the pitch impacting games. The last year-and-a-half has been topsy-turvy for me. I want to get that consistency and rhythm on the pitch, keep playing and enjoy my football. Whether I start or come off the bench, I want to be a threat and score and create goals. I want to be direct and get the ball forward. The squad compliments each other well. We've got some dangerous players and once it comes together and we get some consistency we can really push forward."

On 21 October 2023, Aneke scored his first goal of the season against Reading, before he suffered a hamstring injury ten minutes after scoring and was substituted, as the club won 4–0. After a successful surgery, Aneke was eventually out for four months. On 13 February 2024, Aneke made his return to the first team from injury, coming on as a 64th-minute substitute, and set up an equalising goal for Freddie Ladapo, in a 1–1 draw against Lincoln City. His return was short–lived when he suffered a fitness concern that saw him out for two matches.

On 29 March 2024, Aneke made his first team return, coming on as a 64th-minute substitute, in a 1–1 draw against Exeter City. Following his return from injury, he found his playing time, coming from the substitute bench. On 9 April 2024, Aneke came on as a 68th-minute substitute and scored from a header eleven minutes later, in a 2–2 draw against Wigan Athletic. At the end of the 2023–24 season, he made eighteen appearances and scoring two times in all competitions.

==== 2024–25 season ====
At the start of the 2024–25 season, Aneke continued to find his playing time, coming from the substitute bench. Manager Nathan Jones spoke about his fitness, saying: "It’s a bit early for Chuks,” he explained. “It’s an ongoing process with Chuks, we’re going to need to try and get everything we can out of him, but we can’t take big risks with him. So when he does feel anything then we tend to not risk him." On 7 September 2024, he came on as a 59th-minute substitute and scored an equalising goal, in a 1–1 draw against Rotherham United. His goal against Rotherham United earned him September's Chicken George Goal of the Month award. Aneke was also nominated for Sky Bet League One's Goal of the Month award for September, but did not win.

However, Aneke suffered a groin injury and was out for the rest of the year. On 4 January 2025, he made his return from injury, coming on as an 81st-minute substitute, in a 0–0 draw against Reading. Since returning from injury, Aneke found his playing time from the substitute bench once again. He later contributed three assists against Mansfield Town, Lincoln City and Northampton Town that saw Charlton Athletic earn points. In a match against Wycombe Wanderers on 21 April 2025, Aneke came on as a 78th-minute substitute, only for him to be sent–off in the 90th minute for an off-ball incident involving Luke Leahy, as the club won 3–0. As a result, he served a three match suspension following an unsuccessful appeal.

In the return leg of the League One play-off semi finals against Wycombe Wanderers, Aneke returned from suspension, coming on as a 70th-minute substitute, in a 1–0 win to help Charlton Athletic reach the final. In the final against Leyton Orient, he came on as an 81st-minute substitute, to help the club secure promotion to the EFL Championship. At the end of the 2024–25 season, Aneke made thirty appearances and scoring once in all competitions. On 30 May 2025, it was confirmed Aneke would leave the club following the conclusion of his contract.

=== Shrewsbury Town ===
On 8 September 2025, Aneke joined Shrewsbury Town on a one-year deal.

He made his debut for the club, coming on as a 75th-minute substitute, in a 2–0 loss against Harrogate Town on 20 September 2025. In a follow–up match, Aneke scored his first goal for Shrewsbury Town, in a 2–1 loss against his former club, Milton Keynes Dons. Since joining the club, he found his playing time, coming from the substitute bench. Aneke made his last appearance as a professional footballer, coming on as an 81st-minute substitute, in a 3–0 loss against Bristol Rovers on 1 January 2026.

On 19 January 2026, it was announced that Aneke had stepped away from his playing duties at the club and was leaving by mutual consent having made 15 substitute appearances in all competitions and scoring just one goal.

== Post–playing career ==
On 30 January 2026, it was confirmed that Aneke had taken a scouting and analytical role at the club.

== International career ==
Aneke has represented England at various youth levels. In September 2008, he was first called up to the England U-16. He made his U-16 side debut and started the whole game, in a 6–0 win against Northern Ireland U-16 in the Victory Shield on 3 October 2008. Aneke went on to contribute for England U-16, as they later won the Victory Shield. He went on to make five appearances for the U-16 side.

On 15 August 2009, Aneke was called up to the England U-17 squad for the first time. He made his U-17 debut, in a 1–1 draw against Italy U-17 on 26 August 2009. Aneke scored his first goal for England U-17, in a 1–0 win against Portugal U-17 on 30 August 2009. He then scored twice for the U-17 side, in a 5–0 win against Malta U-17 on 29 March 2010. He was part of the England U-17 squad that qualified for the 2010 European Championship. However, Aneke was not in England's squad for the finals due to injury. He was replaced by Saido Berahino as England went on to win the tournament.

In October 2010, Aneke was called up to the England U-18 squad for the first time. He made his only appearance for the U-18 side, in a 3–0 win against Poland U-18 on 16 November 2010. Despite rumours that he had switched allegiance to Nigeria, Aneke was selected for the England U-19 team for a friendly against the Netherlands U-19. He made his debut for the U-19 team, in a 0–0 draw against Oranje U-19 on 1 September 2011.

== Style of play ==
Aneke is a player not known for his pace, but the ability to see a pass and physical strength. In 2011, he saw similarities between himself and then Arsenal teammate Abou Diaby. Arsène Wenger assessed his style of play as similar to that of Yaya Touré, whom Wenger had intended to sign in 2003 but failed when the player could not secure a work permit, in terms of "body power and good technique", able to "play behind the striker or in a deeper role as well." At one point, Arsenal then-manager Arsène Wenger once played Aneke in the centre–back position in the 2013–14 pre–season matches and said he was suited to play in the position because of his size.

In December 2010, Arsenal then youth coach Steve Bould said that both Aneke and Afobe "are two of the best in England". Teammate Alex Oxlade-Chamberlain described him as a "bully on the pitch." Then Crewe manager Steve Davis commented on Aneke upon joining saying: "Chuks has come in and understandably he is a bit short of that match fitness and sharpness because he has not played many games. He is a very athletic and powerful lad and will only get better. He has a real presence on the pitch and the fitter he becomes, the better he will be. He is 6’3” and a huge lad for someone so young. He has more work to do but he will build on and improve. There will be more to come from him." In an interview with Milton Keynes Citizen, Aneke said: "I like the ball at my feet, and play to football. With my height and strength, I can win headers - I WILL win headers - but I'm good with my feet. As time goes on, you'll see I'm not just a target man."

In October 2018, his then teammate Baily Cargill praised Aneke’s goal scoring form, saying: "He's on fire at the moment. I wouldn't want to play against him. He bullies defenders, and when he's in front of goal, he's got composure to beat the keeper. If he keeps scoring, we'll keep winning. He has got his head down and works really hard in recent weeks. He's reaping the rewards now. But it's a team effort and he'll be the first to tell you that. He's pure strength, such a handful. If we're in trouble, we can hit Chuks and he can keep it."

== Personal life ==
Aneke was born in England to Nigerian parents, and was eligible for the national teams of both countries. Despite previously played for Arsenal, he was a Tottenham Hotspur, Arsenal’s rival.

In May 2018, Aneke’s name was included for the ‘Ball for All’ ahead of the FA Cup Final.

== Career statistics ==
As of match played 1 January 2026

Appearances and goals by club, season and competition
| Club | Season | League | | | National Cup (Note: Includes FA Cup, Belgian Cup) | | League Cup | | Other | | Total | |
| Club | Season | Division | Apps | Goals | Apps | Goals | Apps | Goals | Apps | Goals | Apps | Goals |
|---|---|---|---|---|---|---|---|---|---|---|---|---|
| Arsenal | 2011–12 | Premier League | 0 | 0 | 0 | 0 | 1 | 0 | — | | 1 | 0 |
| Arsenal | 2012–13 | Premier League | 0 | 0 | 0 | 0 | 0 | 0 | — | | 0 | 0 |
| Arsenal | 2013–14 | Premier League | 0 | 0 | 0 | 0 | 0 | 0 | — | | 0 | 0 |
| Arsenal | Total | | 0 | 0 | 0 | 0 | 1 | 0 | — | | 1 | 0 |
| Stevenage (loan) | 2011–12 | League One | 6 | 0 | 0 | 0 | 0 | 0 | 0 | 0 | 6 | 0 |
| Preston North End (loan) | 2011–12 | League One | 7 | 1 | 0 | 0 | 0 | 0 | 0 | 0 | 7 | 1 |
| Crewe Alexandra (loan) | 2012–13 | League One | 30 | 6 | 2 | 1 | 0 | 0 | 6 (Note: Six appearances and one goal in the EFL Trophy) | 1 | 38 | 8 |
| Crewe Alexandra (loan) | 2013–14 | League One | 40 | 14 | 1 | 0 | 1 | 1 | 2 (Note: Two appearances and one goal in the EFL Trophy) | 1 | 44 | 16 |
| Crewe Alexandra (loan) | Total | | 70 | 20 | 3 | 1 | 1 | 1 | 8 | 2 | 82 | 24 |
| Zulte Waregem | 2014–15 | Belgian Pro League | 30 | 2 | 4 | 1 | — | | 4 (Note: Four appearances and one goal in the UEFA Europa League) | 1 | 38 | 4 |
| Zulte Waregem | 2015–16 | Belgian Pro League | 11 | 2 | 1 | 0 | — | | — | | 12 | 2 |
| Zulte Waregem | Total | | 41 | 4 | 5 | 1 | — | | 4 | 1 | 50 | 6 |
| Milton Keynes Dons | 2016–17 | League One | 15 | 4 | 2 | 0 | — | | 1 (Note: One appearance in the EFL Trophy) | 0 | 18 | 4 |
| Milton Keynes Dons | 2017–18 | League One | 31 | 9 | 3 | 1 | 0 | 0 | 1 (Note: One appearance in the EFL Trophy) | 0 | 35 | 10 |
| Milton Keynes Dons | 2018–19 | League Two | 38 | 17 | 1 | 0 | 0 | 0 | 2 (Note: Two appearances and two goals in the EFL Trophy) | 2 | 41 | 19 |
| Milton Keynes Dons | Total | | 84 | 30 | 6 | 1 | 0 | 0 | 4 | 2 | 94 | 33 |
| Charlton Athletic | 2019–20 | Championship | 20 | 1 | 0 | 0 | 1 | 0 | — | | 21 | 1 |
| Charlton Athletic | 2020–21 | League One | 38 | 15 | 1 | 0 | 2 | 1 | 0 | 0 | 41 | 16 |
| Charlton Athletic | Total | | 58 | 16 | 1 | 0 | 3 | 1 | 0 | 0 | 62 | 17 |
| Birmingham City | 2021–22 | Championship | 18 | 2 | 1 | 0 | 2 | 0 | — | | 21 | 2 |
| Charlton Athletic | 2021–22 | League One | 9 | 4 | — | | — | | 1 (Note: One appearance in the EFL Trophy) | 0 | 10 | 4 |
| Charlton Athletic | 2022–23 | League One | 13 | 1 | 3 | 1 | 2 | 1 | 0 | 0 | 18 | 3 |
| Charlton Athletic | 2023–24 | League One | 17 | 2 | 0 | 0 | 0 | 0 | 1 (Note: One appearance in the EFL Trophy) | 0 | 18 | 2 |
| Charlton Athletic | 2024–25 | League One | 26 | 1 | 1 | 0 | 1 | 0 | 2 (Note: Two appearances in the League One play-offs.) | 0 | 30 | 1 |
| Charlton Athletic | Total | | 65 | 8 | 4 | 1 | 3 | 1 | 4 | 0 | 76 | 10 |
| Shrewsbury Town | 2025–26 | League Two | 13 | 1 | 1 | 0 | — | | 1 (Note: One appearance in the EFL Trophy) | 0 | 15 | 1 |
| Career total | | | 362 | 82 | 21 | 4 | 10 | 3 | 21 | 5 | 414 | 94 |

== Honours ==
=== Club ===
Arsenal U18

- Premier Academy League: 2009–10

Crewe Alexandra

- Football League Trophy: 2012–13

Milton Keynes Dons

- EFL League Two third-place promotion: 2018–19

Charlton Athletic

- EFL League One play-offs: 2025

England U16

- Victory Shield: 2008

England U17

- UEFA European Under-17 Championship: 2010
