= 2013–14 Crewe Alexandra F.C. season =

Crewe Alexandra
2013–14 season
- Chairman: John Bowler
- Manager: Steve Davis
- Stadium: Gresty Road
- League One: 19th
- FA Cup: First round
- League Cup: First round
- Football League Trophy: Second round
- Top goalscorer: Chuks Aneke (15)

The 2013–14 season was Crewe Alexandra F.C.'s 90th in the English Football League. They competed in Football League One, the third division of professional football in England, the 2013–14 FA Cup, 2013–14 Football League Cup, and 2013–14 Football League Trophy.

== Final league table ==
Pos	Team	Pld	W	D	L	GF	GA	GD	Pts	Promotion, qualification or relegation
17	Gillingham	46	15	8	23	60	79	−19	53	
18	Coventry City	46	16	13	17	74	77	−3	51 (Note: On 2 August Coventry City were deducted 10 points for exiting administration without a CVA.)	
19	Crewe Alexandra	46	13	12	21	54	80	−26	51	
20	Notts County	46	15	5	26	64	77	−13	50	
21	Tranmere Rovers (R)	46	12	11	23	52	79	−27	47	Relegation to Football League Two

Updated to match(es) played on 3 May 2014. Source: BBC Sport
Rules for classification: 1) Points; 2) Goal difference; 3) Number of goals scored
(R) Relegated

== Results ==
=== Football League One ===
Win Draw Loss Postponed

3 August 2013 1	Crewe Alexandra	3–3	Rotherham United	Crewe
15:00	Grant 3'; Clayton 9'; Davis 47' (pen.)	Report	Frecklington 10', 90'; Pringle 86'	Stadium: Gresty Road; Attendance: 5,926; Referee: Scott Duncan

10 August 2013 2	Milton Keynes Dons	1–0	Crewe Alexandra	Milton Keynes
15:00	Bamford 20'	Report		Stadium: Stadium MK; Attendance: 6,911; Referee: Rob Lewis

17 August 2013 3	Crewe Alexandra	2–1	Tranmere Rovers	Crewe
15:00	Colclough 42', 85'; Osman (yellow card) 76'	Report	Holmes (yellow card) 12' (yellow-red card) 33'; Thompson (yellow card) 16'; Akpa Akpro 87'	Stadium: Gresty Road; Attendance: 4,720; Referee: Andrew Madley

24 August 2013 4	Leyton Orient	2–0	Crewe Alexandra	Leyton
15:00	Odubajo 7'; Mooney 37' (pen.)	Report		Stadium: Brisbane Road; Attendance: 4,455; Referee: Keith Stroud

31 August 2013 5	Swindon Town	5–0	Crewe Alexandra	Swindon
15:00	Ranger 38'; Luongo 44'; Mason 46' 54' (pen.) 70'	Report		Stadium: County Ground; Attendance: 7,419; Referee: Andy Davies

7 September 2013 6	Crewe Alexandra	2–2	Peterborough United	Crewe
15:00	Oliver 15'; Leitch-Smith 21'	Report	Barnett 45'; Bostwick 90'	Stadium: Gresty Road; Attendance: 4,509; Referee: Lee Collins

14 September 2013 7	Crewe Alexandra	0–3	Walsall	Crewe
		Report	Westcarr 66', 69' (pen.); Baxendale 84'	Stadium: Gresty Road; Attendance: 4,260; Referee: Keith Hill

21 September 2013 8	Oldham Athletic	1–1	Crewe Alexandra	Oldham
15:00	MacDonald 54'	Report	Turton 13'	Stadium: Boundary Park; Attendance: 4,273; Referee: Carl Boyeson

28 September 2013 9	Crewe Alexandra	0–3	Gillingham	Crewe
		Report	McDonald 39'; Martin; 50'; Barrett 70'	Stadium: Gresty Road; Attendance: 4,254; Referee: Oliver Langford

5 October 2013 10	Notts County	4–0	Crewe Alexandra	Nottingham
15:00 BST	McGregor 33', 41'; Haynes 66'; Haber 83'	Report		Stadium: Meadow Lane; Attendance: 1,249; Referee: Phil Gibbs

12 October 2013 11	Preston North End	0–2	Crewe Alexandra	Preston
15:00 BST		Report	27' Moore; 64' Inman	Stadium: Deepdale; Attendance: 9,268; Referee: Trevor Kettle

19 October 2013 12	Crewe Alexandra	1–0	Bristol City	Crewe
15:00 BST	Moore 90' (pen.)	Report		Stadium: Gresty Road; Attendance: 4,781; Referee: Geoff Eltringham

22 October 2013 13	Crewe Alexandra	0–3	Stevenage	Crewe
		Report	Morais 11', 20'; Freeman 13'	Stadium: Gresty Road; Attendance: 3,682; Referee: Steve Martin

26 October 2013 14	Sheffield United	3–1	Crewe Alexandra	Sheffield
15:00	Maguire 18', 29'; Flynn 55'	Report	Clayton 77'	Stadium: Bramall Lane; Attendance: 18,784; Referee: Brendan Malone

2 November 2013 15	Crewe Alexandra	0–0	Bradford City	Crewe
		Report		Stadium: Gresty Road; Attendance: 5,428; Referee: Jeremy Simpson

16 November 2013 16	Brentford	5–0	Crewe Alexandra	Brentford, London
15:00	Trotta 43'; Forshaw 46'; Saville 58'; Donaldson 63', 73'	Report		Stadium: Griffin Park; Attendance: 6,616; Referee: Michael Bull

23 November 2013 17	Crewe Alexandra	1–2	Port Vale	Crewe
15:00	Evans 35'	Report	Taylor 43'; Myrie-Williams 83'	Stadium: Gresty Road; Attendance: 6,820; Referee: Graham Salisbury

26 November 2013 18	Carlisle United	2–1	Crewe Alexandra	Carlisle
19:45	Symington 45'; Robson 45+2'	Report	Davis 90+4'	Stadium: Brunton Park; Attendance: 2,969; Referee: Andy Haines

30 November 2013 19	Crewe Alexandra	1–0	Crawley Town	Crewe
	Oliver (yellow card) 46' (yellow-red card) 55'; Aneke 81'	Report	Connolly (yellow card) 77'; Hurst (yellow card) 84'	Stadium: Gresty Road; Attendance: 4,001; Referee: James Adcock

14 December 2013 20	Coventry City	2–2	Crewe Alexandra	Northampton
15:00 GMT	Moussa 36'; Wilson 56' (pen.); Maguire (yellow card) 84'	Report	Hitchcock 14'; Aneke 66'; Davis (yellow card) 41'	Stadium: Sixfields Stadium; Attendance: 1,618; Referee: Steve Bratt

21 December 2013 21	Crewe Alexandra	1–1	Shrewsbury Town	Crewe
15:00 GMT	Hitchcock 21'	Report	Taylor 56'	Stadium: Gresty Road; Attendance: 4,801; Referee: Malone

26 December 2013 22	Wolverhampton Wanderers	2–0	Crewe Alexandra	Wolverhampton
15:00 GMT	Jacobs 3'; Griffiths 90+2'	Report		Stadium: Molineux; Attendance: 22,693; Referee: Stuart Attwell

29 December 2013 23	Colchester United	1–2	Crewe Alexandra	Colchester
15:00 GMT	Garbutt 29'	Report	Aneke 73'; Hitchcock 76'	Stadium: Colchester Community Stadium; Attendance: 3,430; Referee: Lee Collins

1 January 2014 24	Crewe Alexandra	2–1	Carlisle United	Crewe
15:00 GMT	Aneke 53'; Mesca 64'	Report	Lawrence 78'	Stadium: Gresty Road; Attendance: 4,458; Referee: Darren Drysdale

11 January 2014 25	Rotherham United	4–2	Crewe Alexandra	Rotherham
15:00 GMT	Agard 29'; Frecklington 68' (pen.), 90'; Revell 74'	Report	Inman 12'; Mellor 61'	Stadium: New York Stadium; Attendance: 7,737; Referee: Keith Hill

18 January 2014 26	Crewe Alexandra	1–2	Leyton Orient	Crewe
15:00 GMT	Byron Moore 53'	Report	Chris Dagnall 60', 67'	Stadium: Gresty Road; Attendance: 4,830; Referee: Andy Woolmer

21 January 2014 27	Crewe Alexandra	2–0	Milton Keynes Dons	Crewe
19:45 GMT	Aneke 35'; Leitch-Smith 69'	Report		Stadium: Gresty Road; Attendance: 3,613; Referee: Richard Clark

25 January 2014 28	Tranmere Rovers	1–0	Crewe Alexandra	Birkenhead
15:00 GMT	Pennington 28'; Kennedy (yellow card) 36'; Koumas (yellow card) 83'	Report	Evans (yellow card) 37'; Mellor (yellow card) 39'	Stadium: Prenton Park; Attendance: 5,045; Referee: Scott Mathieson

1 February 2014 29	Crewe Alexandra	3–0	Sheffield United	Crewe
15:00 GMT	Aneke 37', 45'; Moore 90+4'	Report		Stadium: Gresty Road; Attendance: 5,437; Referee: Chris Sarginson

8 February 2014 30	Bradford City	3–3	Crewe Alexandra	Bradford
15:00 GMT	Hanson 58'; Jones 59', 84'	Report	Ikpeazu 12', 54'; Pogba 78'	Stadium: Valley Parade; Attendance: 13,343; Referee: Graham Horwood

15 February 2014 31	Crewe Alexandra	1–3	Brentford	Crewe
15:00 GMT	Aneke 70' (pen.)	Report	Judge 9', 52'; Forshaw 61'	Stadium: Gresty Road; Attendance: 4,812; Referee: Salisbury

22 February 2014 32	Port Vale	1–3	Crewe Alexandra	Burslem, Stoke-on-Trent
15:00 GMT	Pope 76'	Report	Pogba 15'; Aneke 48' (pen.); Inman 73'	Stadium: Vale Park; Attendance: 7,812; Referee: Roger East

25 February 2014 33	Stevenage	1–0	Crewe Alexandra	Stevenage
19:45 GMT	Zoko 5'	Report		Stadium: Broadhall Way; Attendance: 1,970; Referee: Darren Sheldrake

1 March 2014 34	Crewe Alexandra	0–0	Swindon Town	Crewe
15:00 GMT	Oliver 77'	Report	Harley 45'	Stadium: Gresty Road; Attendance: 4,433; Referee: Robert Lewis

8 March 2014 35	Peterborough United	4–2	Crewe Alexandra	Peterborough
	Assombalonga 15' (pen.); Ajose 41'; Swanson 60'; Washington 88'	Report	Aneke 13', 58'	Stadium: London Road; Attendance: 5,109; Referee: Gary Sutton

11 March 2014 36	Walsall	1–1	Crewe Alexandra	Bescot, Walsall
19:45 GMT	Ellis 90+1' (o.g.)	Report	Aneke 51'	Stadium: Bescot Stadium; Attendance: 3,777; Referee: Tony Harrington

15 March 2014 37	Crewe Alexandra	1–1	Oldham Athletic	Crewe
15:00 GMT	Davis 90+4'	Report	Gary Harkins 52'	Stadium: Gresty Road; Attendance: 5,258; Referee: David Phillips

22 March 2014 38	Gillingham	1–3	Crewe Alexandra	Gillingham
15:00 GMT	Linganzi 30'	Report	Aneke 5', 53'; Pogba 83'; Grant 2' (88), 90'	Stadium: Priestfield Stadium; Attendance: 5,767; Referee: Steve Bratt

25 March 2014 39	Crewe Alexandra	1–3	Notts County	Crewe
19:45 GMT	Ellis 90+4'	Report	10' Liddle; 79', 87' Murray	Stadium: Gresty Road; Attendance: 3,895; Referee: Seb Stockbridge

29 March 2014 40	Crewe Alexandra	1–2	Coventry City	Crewe
15:00 GMT	J. Clarke 62' (o.g.)	Report	Wilson 27', 81'; Prutton (yellow card) 8'; Moussa (yellow card) 37'; Robinson (yellow card) 60'; Thomas (yellow card) 64'; J. Clarke (yellow card) 72'; Marshall (yellow card) 83'; Baker (yellow card) 85'	Stadium: Gresty Road; Attendance: 5,042; Referee: Andy Davies

5 April 2014 41	Crawley Town	1–2	Crewe Alexandra	Crawley
15:00 BST	Proctor 69'	Report	Ikpeazu 19'; Inman 80'	Stadium: Broadfield Stadium; Attendance: 3,024; Referee: Trevor Kettle

12 April 2014 42	Crewe Alexandra	0–2	Wolverhampton Wanderers	Crewe
15:00 BST		Report	McDonald 45'; Edwards 66'	Stadium: Alexandra Stadium; Attendance: 6,424; Referee: Darren Bond

18 April 2014 43	Shrewsbury Town	1–3	Crewe Alexandra	Shrewsbury
15:00 BST	Bradshaw 90+1'	Report	Pogba 38'; Ikpeazu 51'; Grant 89'	Stadium: New Meadow; Attendance: 6,947; Referee: Gavin Ward

21 April 2014 44	Crewe Alexandra	0–0	Colchester United	Crewe
15:00 BST		Report		Stadium: Gresty Road; Attendance: 4,603; Referee: Kevin Wright

26 April 2014 45	Bristol City	0–0	Crewe Alexandra	Bristol
15:00 BST		Report		Stadium: Ashton Gate Stadium; Attendance: 14,477; Referee: Eddie Ilderton

3 May 2014 46	Crewe Alexandra	2–1	Preston North End	Crewe
15:00 BST	Dugdale 10'; Pogba 60'; Ellis (yellow card) 65'	Report	Wiseman (yellow card) 24'; Welsh 90'	Stadium: Gresty Road; Attendance: 7,458; Referee: Andy Haines

=== FA Cup ===
9 November 2013 First round	Wycombe Wanderers	1–1	Crewe Alexandra	High Wycombe
15:00	Cowan-Hall 37'	Report	Grant 4'	Stadium: Adams Park; Attendance: 1,929; Referee: David Phillips

19 November 2013 First round replay	Crewe Alexandra	0–2	Wycombe Wanderers	Crewe
19:45		Report	Craig 50' (pen.); Doherty 70'	Stadium: Gresty Road; Attendance: 1,695; Referee: Kevin Wright

=== League Cup ===
6 August 2013 First round	Bury	3–2	Crewe Alexandra	Bury
19:45 BST	Beeley 20'; Harrad 29' (pen.); Hinds 49'	Report	Aneke 5'; Davis 75' (pen.)	Stadium: Gigg Lane; Attendance: 2,146; Referee: Mark Brown

=== Football League Trophy ===
3 September 2013 First round	Crewe Alexandra	1–0	Accrington Stanley	Crewe
19:30	Aneke 79'	Report		Stadium: Gresty Road; Attendance: 2,077; Referee: Tony Harrington

8 October 2013 Second round	Fleetwood Town	4–0	Crewe Alexandra	Fleetwood
19:45 BST	Ball 40'; Parkin 44'; Pond 47'; Blair 90'	Report		Stadium: Highbury Stadium; Attendance: 1,928; Referee: Eddie Ilderton

== First-team squad ==
Note: Flags indicate national team as defined under FIFA eligibility rules; some limited exceptions apply. Players may hold more than one non-FIFA nationality.

No.	Pos.	Nation	Player
1	GK	ENG	Steve Phillips
2	DF	ENG	Matt Tootle
3	DF	ENG	Kelvin Mellor (Note: Mellor was born in Copenhagen, Denmark.)
4	DF	ENG	Harry Davis
5	DF	ENG	Mark Ellis
6	DF	ENG	Adam Dugdale
7	FW	ENG	Max Clayton
8	MF	ENG	Abdul Osman (Note: Osman was born in Accra, Ghana.)
9	FW	GUI	Mathias Pogba
10	FW	ENG	A-Jay Leitch-Smith
11	FW	ENG	Byron Moore
12	DF	WAL	George Ray (Note: Ray was born in Warrington, England.)
14	MF	SCO	Bradden Inman (Note: Inman was born in Adelaide, Australia, but also qualifies to represent Scotland internationally through his mother and has represented Scotland at U-19 and U-21.)
16	DF	ENG	Jon Guthrie

No.	Pos.	Nation	Player
18	DF	ENG	Liam Nolan
19	FW	ENG	Vadaine Oliver
20	MF	ENG	Ollie Turton
21	GK	ENG	Ben Garratt
22	MF	ENG	George Evans (on loan from Manchester City)
23	MF	ENG	John Johnston
25	DF	FRA	Thierry Audel
26	FW	ENG	Chuks Aneke (on loan from Arsenal)
27	FW	ENG	Ryan Colclough
29	MF	ENG	Billy Waters
30	FW	ENG	Uche Ikpeazu (on loan from Watford)
31	MF	ENG	Cameron Park (on loan from Middlesbrough)
38	GK	PHI	Neil Etheridge (on loan from Fulham (Note: Etheridge was born in Enfield, England and represented them at U-16 level, but also qualifies to represent the Philippines internationally through his mother and made his international debut for the Philippines in May 2008.))
42	MF	ENG	Anthony Grant

=== Left club during the season ===
Note: Flags indicate national team as defined under FIFA eligibility rules; some limited exceptions apply. Players may hold more than one non-FIFA nationality.

No.	Pos.	Nation	Player
13	GK	SCO	Alan Martin (to Aldershot Town)
15	DF	SCO	Gregor Robertson (to Northampton Town)
17	FW	ENG	Tom Hitchcock (on loan from Queens Park Rangers)

No.	Pos.	Nation	Player
23	DF	ENG	Michael West (to Ebbsfleet United)
24	DF	ENG	Lee Molyneux (on loan to Accrington Stanley)
28	MF	GNB	Mesca (on loan from Fulham)

== Transfers ==
=== Transfers in ===
Date	Pos.	Nat.	Player	From†	Fee	Ref.
15 July 2013	MF	JAM	Anthony Grant	(Stevenage)	Free transfer	
10 June 2013	FW	ENG	Vadaine Oliver	Lincoln City	Undisclosed	
24 June 2013	DF	FRA	Thierry Audel	Macclesfield Town	Undisclosed	
1 July 2013	MF	ENG	Lee Molyneux	(Accrington Stanley)	Free transfer	
22 August 2013	MF	AUS	Brad Inman	Newcastle United	Undisclosed	
31 January 2014	MF	ENG	John Johnston	Leek Town	Free transfer	

† Brackets around club names denote the player's contract with that club had expired before he joined Crewe.

=== Loans in ===
Date	Pos.	Nat.	Player	From	Duration	Ref.
2 August 2013	FW	ENG	Chuks Aneke	Arsenal	Until end of season	
28 October 2013	MF	ENG	George Evans	Manchester City	Until 3 February 2014	
22 November 2013	GK	PHI	Neil Etheridge	Fulham	Until 1 January 2014	
28 November 2013	FW	ENG	Tom Hitchcock	Queens Park Rangers	Until 7 January 2014	
28 November 2013	MF	GNB	Mesca	Fulham	Until 7 January 2014	
13 January 2014	FW	UGA	Uche Ikpeazu	Watford	Until end of season	
25 February 2014	GK	PHI	Neil Etheridge	Fulham	Until 4 April 2014	
27 February 2014	MF	SCO	Cameron Park	Middlesbrough	One-month loan	

=== Transfers out ===
Date	Pos.	Nat.	Player	To†	Fee	Ref.
30 June 2013	FW	ENG	Harry Clayton	(Nantwich Town)	Released	
30 June 2013	DF	ENG	Andy White	(Nantwich Town)	Released	
30 June 2013	DF	ENG	Paris Bateman	(Stockport County)	Released	
30 June 2013	MF	ENG	Brendon Daniels		Released	
1 July 2013	MF	ENG	Luke Murphy	Leeds United	£1,000,000	
16 October 2013	FW	ENG	Nathan Ellington	(Southport)	Released	
3 January 2014	MF	ENG	Michael West	Ebbsfleet United	Free transfer	
27 January 2014	GK	SCO	Alan Martin	(Aldershot Town)	Mutual consent	
17 January 2014	DF	SCO	Gregor Robertson	(Northampton Town)	Mutual consent	

† Brackets around club names denote the player joined that club after his Morecambe contract expired.

=== Loans out ===
Date	Pos.	Nat.	Player	To	Duration	Ref.
31 January 2014	DF	FRA	Thierry Audel	Lincoln City	One-month loan	
22 November 2013	MF	ENG	Lee Molyneux	Rochdale	Until January 2014	
23 January 2014	MF	ENG	Lee Molyneux	Accrington Stanley	Until April 2014	
30 August 2013	DF	ENG	Adam Dugdale	Tranmere Rovers	One-month loan	
26 August 2013	MF	ENG	Michael West	Hereford United	One-month loan	
31 January 2014	MF	ENG	John Johnston	Leek Town		
