= Mesca =

Bissau-Guinean footballer (born 1993)

Personal information
- Full name: Buomesca Tué Na Bangna
- Date of birth: 6 May 1993 (age 33)
- Place of birth: Bissau, Guinea-Bissau
- Height: 1.75 m (5 ft 9 in)
- Position: Midfielder

Team information
- Current team: Doxa Katokopias
- Number: 70

Youth career
- ?–2010: Sporting CP
- 2010–2011: Chelsea

Senior career*
Years	Team	Apps	(Gls)
2011–2015	Fulham	1	(0)
2013–2014	→ Crewe Alexandra (loan)	6	(1)
2015–2018	AEL Limassol	76	(8)
2018–2019	Beroe	32	(1)
2019–2023	Doxa Katokopias	99	(1)
2024–	Doxa Katokopias	15	(0)

International career^{‡}
2009	Portugal U17	2	(0)
2011	Portugal U18	3	(0)
2011	Portugal U19	3	(0)
- * Club domestic league appearances and goals as of 20 June 2024 ‡ National team caps and goals as of 17:51, 28 November 2013 (UTC)

Buomesca Tué Na Bangna (born 6 May 1993), commonly known as Mesca, is a professional footballer who plays as a midfielder for Doxa Katokopias. Born in Guinea-Bissau, Mesca has represented Portugal internationally at youth level.

== Club career ==
Born in Bissau, Guinea-Bissau, Mesca began his career at Sporting CP before joining Chelsea in May 2010. He joined Chelsea's rivals Fulham on a one-year professional contract in September 2011 that ran until June 2012. He signed a new three-year contract with the club in April 2013.

Ahead of the 2012–13 season, Mesca was included in a pre-season friendly squad with the first team. He made his Premier League debut in Fulham's 2–0 defeat away to Chelsea on 21 September 2013.

On 28 November 2013, Mesca joined Crewe Alexandra on loan until 7 January 2014. He scored his first senior goal against Carlisle United in a 2–1 win on 1 January 2014, and manager Steve Davis considered bringing him back to Gresty Road afterwards.

After playing no part in the previous season for Fulham, Mesca left for AEL Limassol of the Cypriot First Division on 7 August 2015. Five days later he made his debut, playing the entirety of the Cypriot Super Cup against APOEL FC, a penalty shootout victory after a goalless draw.

On 11 June 2018, Mesca signed with Bulgarian club Beroe Stara Zagora.

In August 2019, he joined Cypriot team Doxa Katokopias.

== International career ==
Mesca has represented Portugal at youth level. He was selected to the preliminary Guinea-Bissau squad for the 2017 Africa Cup of Nations.

== Personal life ==
Mesca is the brother of former PSV winger Bruma.

== Career statistics ==
As of match played 21 February 2019

Club	Season	League			Cup		League Cup		Other		Total	
Club	Season	Division	Apps	Goals	Apps	Goals	Apps	Goals	Apps	Goals	Apps	Goals
Fulham	2013–14	Premier League	1	0	0	0	0	0	—		1	0
Crewe Alexandra (loan)	2013–14	League One	6	1	0	0	—		—		6	1
AEL Limassol	2015–16	Cypriot First Division	30	4	4	0	—		1	0	35	4
AEL Limassol	2016–17	Cypriot First Division	29	4	3	0	—		—		32	4
AEL Limassol	2017–18	Cypriot First Division	17	0	0	0	—		6 (Note: Appearances in UEFA Europa League)	1	23	1
AEL Limassol	Total		76	8	7	0	—		7	1	89	9
Beroe	2018–19	First Professional Football League	19	1	2	0	—		—		21	1
Career total			112	10	9	0	0	0	7	1	118	10

== Honours ==
AEL

- Cypriot Super Cup: 2015
