= Lartey Sarpong =

Association football player

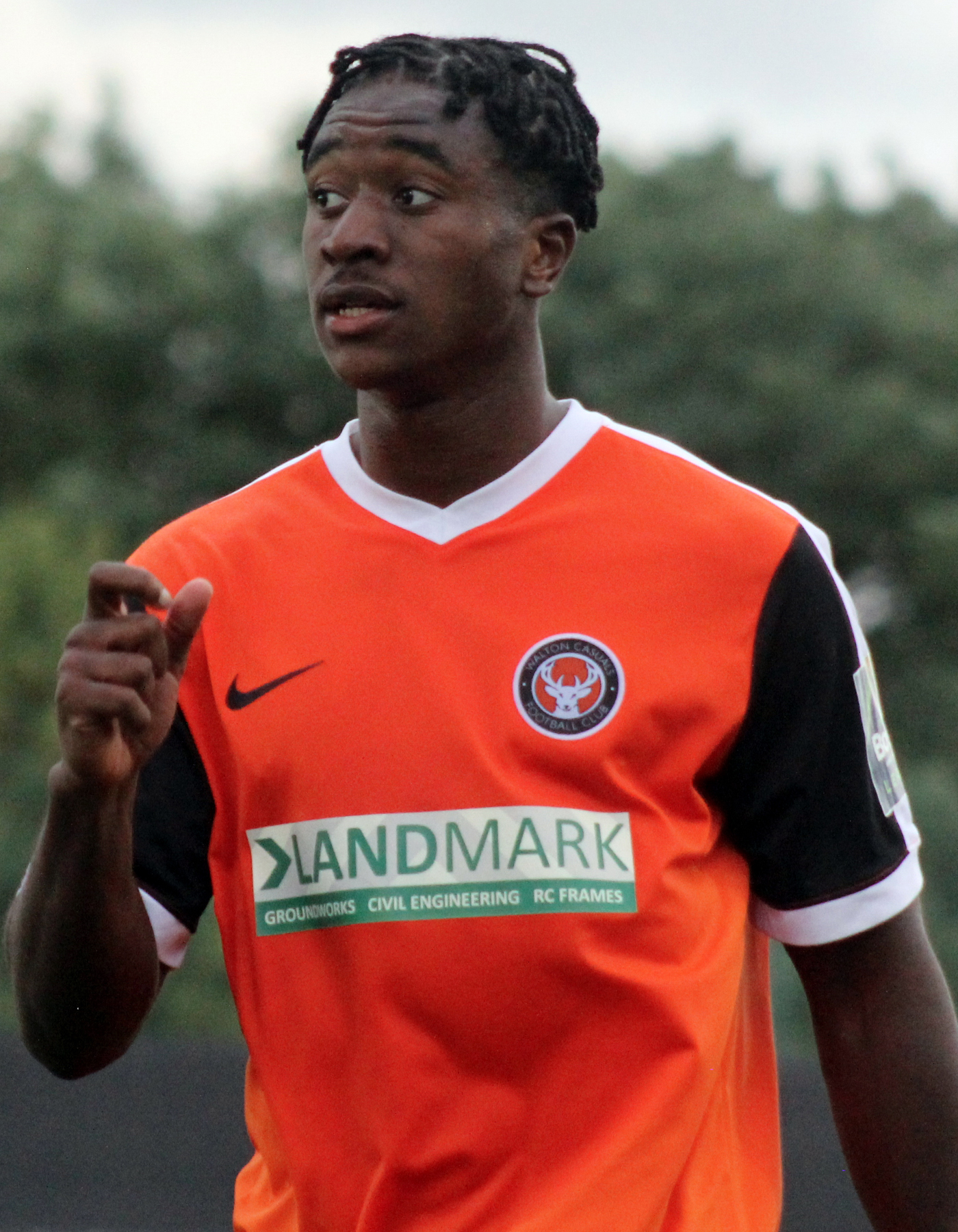
- Sarpong playing for Walton Casuals in 2017

Personal information
- Full name: Nana Owiredu Lartey Sarpong
- Date of birth: 16 September 1996 (age 30)
- Place of birth: London, England
- Position: Midfielder

Youth career
- 2011–2013: Bromley
- 2013–2015: Notts County

Senior career*
| Years | Team | Apps | (Gls) |
| 2015–2016 | Notts County | 1 | (0) |
| 2015 | → Boston United (loan) | 3 | (0) |
| 2016 | Billericay Town | 1 | (0) |
| 2016–2017 | Grays Athletic | 21 | (1) |
| 2017–2018 | Walton Casuals | 43 | (12) |
- * Club domestic league appearances and goals as of 28 April 2018

Nana Owiredu Lartey Sarpong (born 16 September 1996) is an English-Ghanaian footballer who last played for Southern League South Division club Walton Casuals as a midfielder.

He has also played for Notts County, Boston United, Billericay Town and Grays Athletic.

== Club career ==
=== Early career ===
Sarpong began his career as a youth team player at Bromley, and represented the Kent County Football Association team at Under-16 level.

=== Notts County ===
In November 2013, Sarpong joined Notts County after being spotted by local scouts. He signed a professional contract in April 2015.

On 23 April 2016, he made his professional debut as a substitute for Graham Burke in a 2–1 League Two defeat against Cambridge United. Sarpong was released by the club in May 2016.

==== Boston United (loan) ====
In September 2015, Sarpong moved to National League North club Boston United on a three-month loan.

He made his debut as a substitute in a 2–1 defeat to Chorley, but was ruled out for over a month in his second appearance for the club. His final appearance came in a 2–1 win over Alfreton Town before a return to his parent club.

=== Billericay Town ===
Upon his release, Sarpong joined Isthmian Premier Division club Billericay Town's Under-21 squad.

On 24 August 2016, he made a single appearance for the first-team in a 1–0 defeat to Lowestoft Town. Sarpong was named as an unused substitute in the club's FA Cup campaign.

=== Grays Athletic ===
In December 2016, Sarpong joined Isthmian Premier Division rivals Grays Athletic. On 27 December, he made his debut in a 2–0 defeat to Dulwich Hamlet on 27 December. Sarpong scored his first senior goal in a 2–1 defeat to Hendon on 4 February 2017. He left the club at the end of the season.

=== Walton Casuals ===
After trials with Staines Town and Walton Casuals, Sarpong joined the latter in August 2017. He made his debut in a 2–1 win at Hythe Town on Saturday 12 August, and scored his first goal for the club three days later in a 4–0 victory over Chipstead. On 26 September, Sarpong scored twice in a 3–3 draw at Greenwich Borough and added another brace two weeks later in a 3–0 win against Canvey Island. On 5 December, he scored twice in a 3–0 victory against Sittingbourne.

After starting in the Isthmian League South Division Play-Off Semi-Final, Sarpong came off the bench in the Play-Off Final at Corinthian-Casuals. He scored his team's fourth and final penalty to secure promotion to step three of the non-league pyramid.

== Statistics ==
As of match played 5 May 2018

Appearances and goals by club, season and competition
| Club | Season | League | | | FA Cup | | League Cup | | Other | | Total | |
| Club | Season | Division | Apps | Goals | Apps | Goals | Apps | Goals | Apps | Goals | Apps | Goals |
|---|---|---|---|---|---|---|---|---|---|---|---|---|
| Notts County | 2015–16 | League Two | 1 | 0 | 0 | 0 | 0 | 0 | 0 | 0 | 1 | 0 |
| Boston United (loan) | 2015–16 | National League North | 3 | 0 | 0 | 0 | 0 | 0 | 0 | 0 | 3 | 0 |
| Billericay Town | 2016–17 | Isthmian Premier Division | 1 | 0 | 0 | 0 | 0 | 0 | 0 | 0 | 1 | 0 |
| Grays Athletic | 2016–17 | Isthmian Premier Division | 21 | 1 | 0 | 0 | 0 | 0 | 0 | 0 | 21 | 1 |
| Walton Casuals | 2017–18 | Isthmian South Division | 43 | 12 | 2 | 0 | 1 | 0 | 5 (Note: One appearance in the FA Trophy.) (Note: Two appearances in the Southern Combination Challenge Cup.) (Note: Two appearances in the Isthmian League South Division Play-Offs.) | 1 (Note: One goal in the Southern Combination Challenge Cup.) | 51 | 13 |
| Career total | | | 69 | 13 | 2 | 0 | 1 | 0 | 5 | 1 | 77 | 14 |

== Honours ==
Walton Casuals

- Isthmian League South Division Play-Off Champions: 2017–18
