= Thierry Audel =

French footballer (born 1987)

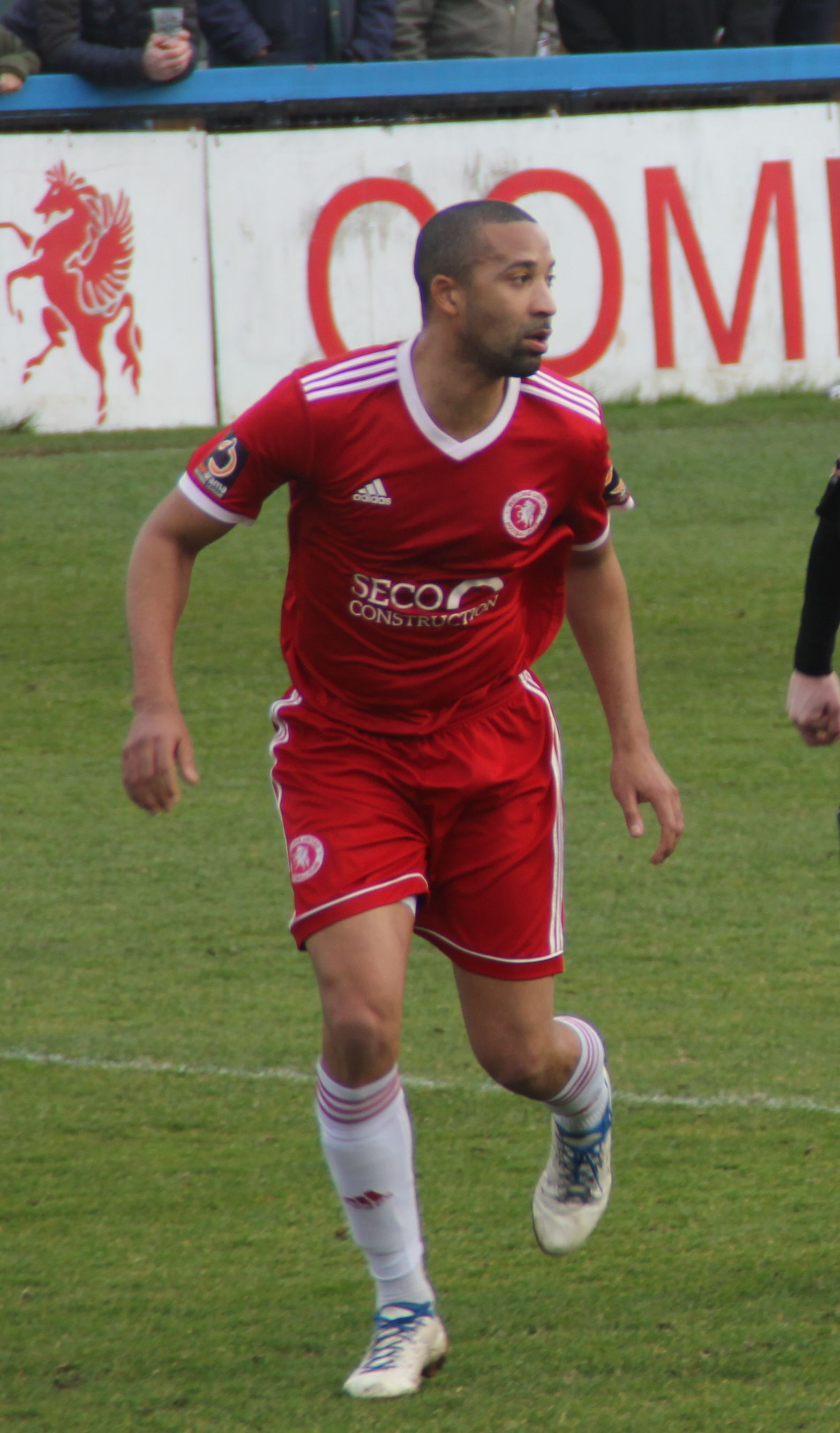
- Thierry Audel playing for Welling United against St Albans City (2 March 2019)

Personal information
- Full name: Thierry Gerard Audel
- Date of birth: 15 January 1987 (age 39)
- Place of birth: Nice, France
- Height: 1.88 m (6 ft 2 in)
- Positions: Centre back; right back

Team information
- Current team: Brackley Town

Youth career
- 1992–1997: Saint Laurent Du Var
- 1997–2001: Cavigal de Nice
- 2001–2003: OGC Nice
- 2003–2004: FC Istres
- 2004–2006: Auxerre

Senior career*
Years	Team	Apps	(Gls)
2006–2007	Auxerre	0	(0)
2007	Izola	0	(0)
2007–2010	Triestina	6	(1)
2008–2009	→ San Marino (loan)	32	(1)
2010–2012	Pisa	29	(0)
2013	Macclesfield Town	19	(1)
2013–2015	Crewe Alexandra	4	(0)
2014	→ Lincoln City (loan)	14	(3)
2014	→ Lincoln City (loan)	3	(0)
2015	Macclesfield Town	12	(2)
2015–2017	Notts County	44	(3)
2017–2018	Barrow	7	(0)
2018–2019	Welling United	41	(8)
2019–2020	Brackley Town	28	(7)
2020–2022	Rapallo Ruentes		
2022–2023	Sestrese		

International career
- France U19
- * Club domestic league appearances and goals as of 12:27, 3 March 2019 (UTC)

Thierry Gerard Audel (born 15 January 1987) is a French footballer who plays as a centre back.

He has played in France, Italy and England (also spending a brief time on the books of Slovenian club Izola). A reserve team player at AJ Auxerre, he spent three years at Italian side Triestina from 2007 to 2010, and also played on loan at San Marino, before moving on to Pisa. He moved to England in January 2013 to play for Macclesfield Town, before signing with Crewe Alexandra five months later. During his time at Crewe, Audel had two loan spells at Lincoln City. In February 2015, Audel re-signed for Macclesfield Town, before a summer move to newly relegated Notts County in League Two. In July 2017, Audel joined Barrow, moving to Welling United a year later.

== Career ==
Audel played for the reserves of Auxerre before moving to the Italian Serie B club U.S. Triestina Calcio in 2007 via MNK Izola (a pure transfer trick or allegedly false accounting). (Note: Triestina also signed Nicolas Desenclos, Michel Orneck along with Audel (for €200,000) from Izola for a total of €900,000 in 3-year contract. Izola signed Desenclos, Orneck and Audel from Montpellier, Monaco and Auxerre respectively and responsible to pay training compensation instead of Triestina (and may in difference amount, i.e. saved cost), despite FIFA DRC later ruled that the true club they joined should pay the training compensation in Attila Filkor's case. The liquidator of Triestina, accused the €900,000 to Izola was instead false accounting.) He played two Serie B games for Triestina in the 2007–08 season, and spent the 2008–09 season in the Lega Pro Seconda Divisione for San Marino, making 31 appearances.

Audel had an unsuccessful trial at Portsmouth in summer 2009. He moved to A.C. Pisa 1909 of the Lega Pro Prima Divisione in mid-2010. He made eight appearances in the 2010–11 season and played 23 matches in the 2011–12 campaign.

He had a trial with Conference National club Luton Town in December 2012. The following month he signed a deal with Macclesfield Town. He played 20 games for the Silkmen in the latter half of the 2012–13 season, putting in a number of impressive displays. He did, however, give away a penalty in a 1–0 defeat to Premier League side Wigan Athletic at Moss Rose on 26 January after mistiming a tackle on Callum McManaman.

He signed a two-year contract with League One side Crewe Alexandra in June 2013 after manager Steve Davis paid Macclesfield an undisclosed fee. However, he played just five games for the Railwaymen, being sent on two loan spells to Lincoln City, before returning to Macclesfield Town in February 2015. He then played for newly relegated Notts County in League Two for two seasons. In July 2017, Audel joined Barrow, moving to Welling United a year later.

On 27 June 2019, it was confirmed that Audel had joined Brackley Town.

== Style of play ==
Audel is a defender who can play at centre-back and at right-back. His agent described him as a "strong and powerful defender who's good on the ball".

== Personal life ==
He is the cousin of former French footballer Johan Audel.

== Statistics ==
Season	Club	Division	League		FA Cup		League Cup		Other		Total	
Season	Club	Division	Apps	Goals	Apps	Goals	Apps	Goals	Apps	Goals	Apps	Goals
2007–08	Triestina	Serie B	2	0	0	0	0	0	0	0	2	0
2008–09	Triestina	Serie B	0	0	0	0	0	0	0	0	0	0
2008–09	San Marino (loan)	Lega Pro Seconda Divisione	31	1	0	0	0	0	0	0	31	1
2009–10	Triestina	Serie B	6	1	0	0	0	0	1	0	7	1
Triestina total			8	1	0	0	0	0	1	0	9	1
2010–11	Pisa	Lega Pro Prima Divisione	8	0	0	0	0	0	0	0	8	0
2011–12	Pisa	Lega Pro Prima Divisione	21	0	0	0	0	0	2	0	23	0
Pisa total			29	0	0	0	0	0	2	0	31	0
2012–13	Macclesfield Town	National League	19	1	1	0	0	0	0	0	20	1
Macclesfield total			19	1	1	0	0	0	0	0	20	1
2013–14	Crewe Alexandra	League One	2	0	0	0	0	0	0	0	2	0
2013–14	Lincoln City (loan)	National League	14	3	0	0	0	0	0	0	14	3
2014–15	Crewe Alexandra	League One	2	0	0	0	0	0	1	0	3	0
2014–15	Lincoln City (loan)	National League	3	0	1	0	0	0	0	0	4	0
Crewe total			4	0	0	0	0	0	1	0	5	0
2014–15	Macclesfield Town	National League	12	2	0	0	0	0	0	0	12	2
Macclesfield total			12	2	0	0	0	0	2	0	12	2
2015–16	Notts County	League Two	28	2	1	0	2	0	2	0	33	2
2016–17	Notts County	League Two	16	1	1	0	1	0	2	0	20	1
Notts County total			44	3	2	0	3	0	4	0	53	3
2017–18	Barrow	National League	7	0	0	0	0	0	0	0	7	0
Barrow total			7	0	0	0	0	0	0	0	7	0
2018–19	Welling United	National League South	33	4	3	1	0	0	0	0	36	5
Welling United total			33	4	3	1	0	0	0	0	36	5
Career total			204	15	7	1	3	0	8	0	220	16

== Honours ==
Welling United

- London Senior Cup (1): 2018–19
