= Michael West (footballer) =

English footballer (born 1991)

Personal information
- Full name: Michael West
- Date of birth: 9 February 1991 (age 35)
- Place of birth: Maidstone, England
- Position: Midfielder

Team information
- Current team: Ashford United (on loan from Whitstable Town)

Youth career
- Fulham
- ?–2009: Ebbsfleet United

Senior career*
Years	Team	Apps	(Gls)
2009–2012	Ebbsfleet United	106	(27)
2012–2014	Crewe Alexandra	10	(0)
2013	→ Hereford United (loan)	8	(1)
2014–2016	Ebbsfleet United	21	(1)
2016	→ Whitehawk (loan)	15	(2)
2016–2017	Whitehawk	38	(4)
2017–2018	Chelmsford City	20	(1)
2018	→ Kingstonian (loan)	15	(1)
2018–2020	Eastbourne Borough	54	(4)
2018–2019	→ Tonbridge Angels (loan)	5	(0)
2020–2022	Ebbsfleet United	16	(1)
2022	→ Herne Bay (loan)	8	(1)
2022–2023	Herne Bay	22	(0)
2023–2024	Ramsgate	18	(0)
2024–	Whitstable Town	10	(0)
2024–	→ Ashford United (loan)	16	(4)
- * Club domestic league appearances and goals as of 11:34, 12 April 2025 (UTC)

Michael West (born 9 February 1991) is an English footballer who plays as a midfielder for Ashford United on loan from Isthmian League South East Division club Whitstable Town.

== Career ==
He started his career as a trainee with Fulham before joining the Ebbsfleet United PASE youth system. He went on to sign his first professional contract with the club in January 2009, making his debut in a 1–0 win over Northwich Victoria in the Football Conference. A series of impressive performances, including scoring a brace in a 2–2 draw against Luton Town, drawing the attention of many league clubs, with Fulham, Stevenage and Portsmouth all rumoured to have been interested in acquiring his services. In July 2012, he joined newly promoted Football League One side Crewe Alexandra for a nominal compensation fee. He made his professional debut for Crewe on 20 October 2012, in a 2–2 draw with Walsall, coming on as a substitute for Max Clayton.

On 26 August 2013 he joined Conference National side Hereford United on loan for a month, making his debut on the same day in a 2–1 defeat to Alfreton Town. He rejoined Ebbsfleet in January 2014. A serious injury early in his second spell at Ebbsfleet meant that he didn't play for a year. He made his comeback from injury as a substitute in a 3–0 win over Whitehawk, scoring the third goal. Injuries continued to hamper his progress, although West did get the fourth goal in a 4–1 FA Trophy win against Molesey.

West played the second half of the 2015–2016 season on loan at Whitehawk, before signing permanently in July 2016 following his release from Stonebridge Road.

In June 2017, West signed for Chelmsford City.

On 27 June 2018, West signed for Eastbourne Borough.

On 17 July 2020, West returned to Ebbsfleet United.

On 18 March 2022, West joined Isthmian League South East Division side Herne Bay on loan until 23 April 2022. In June 2022, West returned to the club on a permanent basis having helped the club to promotion through the play-offs.

In June 2024, West joined Southern Counties East Football League Premier Division side Whitstable Town. In December 2024, in search of more regular first-team football, he joined Ashford United on loan.

== Career statistics ==
As of match played 14 March 2020

Appearances and goals by club, season and competition
Club	Season	League			FA Cup		League Cup		Other		Total	
Club	Season	Division	Apps	Goals	Apps	Goals	Apps	Goals	Apps	Goals	Apps	Goals
Ebbsfleet United	2008–09	Conference Premier	9	0	0	0	—		0	0	9	0
Ebbsfleet United	2009–10	Conference Premier	22	0	0	0	—		0	0	22	0
Ebbsfleet United	2010–11	Conference South	39	19	3	0	—		2 (Note: Appearances in FA Trophy)	0	44	19
Ebbsfleet United	2011–12	Conference Premier	36	8	1	0	—		2	0	39	8
Ebbsfleet United	Ebbsfleet United total I		106	27	4	0	0	0	4	0	114	27
Crewe Alexandra	2012–13	League One	8	0	1	0	0	0	0	0	9	0
Crewe Alexandra	2013–14	League One	2	0	0	0	1	0	0	0	3	0
Crewe Alexandra	Crewe Alexandra total		10	0	1	0	1	0	0	0	12	0
Hereford United (loan)	2013–14	Conference Premier	8	1	0	0	—		0	0	8	1
Ebbsfleet United	2013–14	Conference South	10	0	0	0	—		1	0	11	0
Ebbsfleet United	2014–15	Conference South	6	1	0	0	—		0	0	6	1
Ebbsfleet United	2015–16	National League South	5	0	1	0	—		4 (Note: Two appearances in Kent Senior Cup, two appearances and a goal in FA Trophy)	1	10	1
Ebbsfleet United	Ebbsfleet United total II		21	1	1	0	0	0	5	1	27	2
Whitehawk (loan)	2015–16	National League South	15	2	0	0	—		0	0	15	2
Whitehawk	2016–17	National League South	38	4	3	0	—		3	2	44	6
Chelmsford City	2017–18	National League South	20	1	2	1	—		3 (Note: Two appearances in Essex Senior Cup, one appearance and one goal in FA Trophy)	1	25	3
Kingstonian (loan)	2017–18	Isthmian League Premier	15	1	0	0	—		0	0	15	1
Eastbourne Borough	2018–19	National League South	28	3	2	0	—		4 (Note: Two appearances and one goal in Sussex Senior Cup, two appearances in FA Trophy)	1	34	4
Eastbourne Borough	2019–20	National League South	26	1	2	0	—		6 (Note: Three appearances in Sussex Senior Cup, three appearances in FA Trophy)	0	34	1
Eastbourne Borough	Eastbourne Borough total		54	4	4	0	0	0	10	1	68	5
Tonbridge Angels (loan)	2018–19	Isthmian League Premier	5	0	0	0	—		0	0	5	0
Ebbsfleet United	2020–21	Conference South	10	1	0	0	—		1	0	11	1
Ebbsfleet United	2021–22	Conference South	6	0	1	0	—		1	0	8	0
Ebbsfleet United	Ebbsfleet United total III		16	1	1	0	0	0	2	0	19	1
Herne Bay (loan)	2021–22	Isthmian League South East	8	1	0	0	—		2 (Note: Two appearances in Isthmian League South East Division Play-Offs)	0	10	1
Career total			316	43	16	1	1	0	29	5	362	49
