= Tom Hitchcock =

English footballer

Personal information
- Full name: Thomas Joseph Hitchcock
- Date of birth: 1 October 1992 (age 34)
- Place of birth: Hemel Hempstead, England
- Height: 1.81 m (5 ft 11 in)
- Position: Forward

Team information
- Current team: Real Bedford F.C.

Youth career
- Watford
- 2007–2011: Blackburn Rovers

Senior career*
Years	Team	Apps	(Gls)
2011–2012	Blackburn Rovers	0	(0)
2011	→ Plymouth Argyle (loan)	8	(0)
2012–2014	Queens Park Rangers	1	(1)
2012	→ Bristol Rovers (loan)	17	(3)
2013–2014	→ Crewe Alexandra (loan)	6	(3)
2014	→ Rotherham United (loan)	11	(5)
2014–2016	Milton Keynes Dons	12	(0)
2014–2015	→ Fleetwood Town (loan)	6	(1)
2015	→ Stevenage (loan)	10	(2)
2016	→ Crewe Alexandra (loan)	7	(0)
2017	Boreham Wood	11	(0)
2017–2018	Chelmsford City	11	(1)
2018	Biggleswade Town		
2018	Chesham United	5	(0)
2018–2019	Harlow Town	24	(8)
2019	Cheshunt	7	(3)
2019–2021	Bedford Town	25	(11)
2020	→ Cambridge City (loan)	2	(1)
2021–2022	Cambridge City	1	(1)
2022–	Real Bedford	0	(0)
- * Club domestic league appearances and goals as of 22:56, 14 August 2021 (UTC)

Thomas Joseph Hitchcock (born 1 October 1992) is an English footballer who plays as a forward for Real Bedford F.C.

== Club career ==
=== Blackburn Rovers ===
Hitchcock progressed through the youth system at Blackburn Rovers academy after officially joining in 2007, after being recommended by his father Kevin Hitchcock who was then goalkeeping coach at the club. He made his breakthrough into the Blackburn Rovers reserve team in 2009, scoring his first goal that year.

On 19 July 2011, following a successful pre-season trial, Hitchcock joined then League Two side Plymouth Argyle on an initial three-month loan, eventually making 10 appearances for the club before returning to his parent club.

On 2 February 2012, Hitchcock became a free agent following the mutual cancellation of his contract with Blackburn.

=== Queens Park Rangers ===
On 4 March 2012 Hitchcock signed a one-year deal with Queens Park Rangers. On 17 August 2013, Hitchcock made his debut for the club as an 83rd-minute substitute for Bobby Zamora, scoring a 90th-minute winner in a 1–0 win over Ipswich Town.

Following limited first team opportunities, Hitchcock signed on loan for League One side Crewe Alexandra. He went on to make 6 appearances for the club, scoring 3 goals.

On 10 January 2014, Tom joined Rotherham United on a month-long loan. He scored his first goal for the club on his second appearance, opening the scoring in a 3–0 win against Shrewsbury Town. On 5 April, he scored his first professional career hat-trick in a 4–3 win against Gillingham.

=== Milton Keynes Dons ===
On 1 July 2014, Hitchcock joined Milton Keynes Dons on a three-year contract following his release from Queens Park Rangers.

On 31 October 2014, Hitchcock signed on loan for Fleetwood Town, and scored just three minutes into his debut in a 1–0 win against Gillingham. He went on to make seven appearances for the club, before returning to Milton Keynes Dons in January 2015.

On 7 August 2015, Hitchcock signed for League Two side Stevenage, initially on a one-month loan which was later extended. Hitchcock made his debut for Stevenage against Notts County but was sent off on his debut. Hitchcock scored his first goal for Stevenage in a 1–1 away draw to Dagenham & Redbridge. Hitchcock scored his second goal for the club on 19 September 2015 in a 3–2 away defeat to Barnet before returning to Milton Keynes Dons. On 23 February 2016, Hitchcock returned to League One side Crewe Alexandra on loan for the rest of the 2015–16 season.

On 9 August 2016, Hitchcock left Milton Keynes Dons, becoming a free agent following the mutual termination of his contract. He joined Port Vale on trial in January 2017.

=== Non-league ===
On 11 September 2017, Hitchcock signed for Chelmsford City.

Following departing Chelmsford in March 2018, Hitchcock joined Biggleswade Town on 31 August 2018. He then joined Chesham United and Harlow Town in quick succession. Hitchcock joined Cheshunt at the start of the 2019–20 season, before joining Bedford Town. Hitchcock signed for Cambridge City for the 2021–22 season, having played for the Lilywhites on loan the previous year.

== Personal life ==
Hitchcock is the son of former Chelsea goalkeeper Kevin Hitchcock. While attending Kingshott School in Hitchin, he was a member of the Watford academy along with classmate Ben Nugent, combining his studies and appearances for the school's first XI with his Academy commitments. When his father was appointed as goalkeeping coach at Blackburn Rovers as part of Mark Hughes' coaching team in 2004, Hitchcock and his family moved north and Tom transferred to the Blackburn youth teams.

== Career statistics ==
As of match played 9 December 2017

Appearances and goals by club, season and competition
Club	Season	League			FA Cup		League Cup		Other		Total	
Club	Season	Division	Apps	Goals	Apps	Goals	Apps	Goals	Apps	Goals	Apps	Goals
Blackburn Rovers	2011–12	Premier League	0	0	0	0	0	0	—		0	0
Blackburn Rovers	Total		0	0	0	0	0	0	—		0	0
Plymouth Argyle (loan)	2011–12	League Two	8	0	0	0	1	0	1 (Note: Appearances in the Football League Trophy)	0	10	0
Plymouth Argyle (loan)	Total		8	0	0	0	1	0	1	0	10	0
Queens Park Rangers	2012–13	Premier League	0	0	0	0	0	0	—		0	0
Queens Park Rangers	2013–14	Championship	1	1	0	0	1	0	—		2	1
Queens Park Rangers	Total		1	1	0	0	1	0	—		2	1
Bristol Rovers (loan)	2012–13	League Two	17	3	0	0	0	0	0	0	17	3
Crewe Alexandra (loan)	2013–14	League One	6	3	0	0	0	0	0	0	6	3
Rotherham United (loan)	2013–14	League One	11	5	0	0	0	0	0	0	11	5
Rotherham United (loan)	Total		34	11	0	0	0	0	0	0	34	11
Milton Keynes Dons	2014–15	League One	12	0	0	0	1	0	1	0	14	0
Milton Keynes Dons	2015–16	Championship	0	0	0	0	0	0	—		0	0
Milton Keynes Dons	Total		12	0	0	0	1	0	1	0	14	0
Fleetwood Town (loan)	2014–15	League One	6	1	1	0	0	0	0	0	7	1
Stevenage (loan)	2015–16	League Two	10	2	0	0	0	0	1	0	11	2
Crewe Alexandra (loan)	2015–16	League One	7	0	0	0	0	0	0	0	7	0
Crewe Alexandra (loan)	Total		23	3	1	0	0	0	1	0	25	3
Boreham Wood	2016–17	National League	11	0	0	0	—		2 (Note: Appearances in the FA Trophy)	0	13	0
Chelmsford City	2017–18	National League South	8	0	2	0	—		0	0	10	0
Career total			97	15	3	0	3	0	5	0	108	15

== Honours ==
Rotherham United

- Football League One play-offs: 2014
