= Cieron Keane =

Irish footballer (born 1996)

Personal information
- Full name: Cieron Macaully Keane
- Date of birth: 14 August 1996 (age 30)
- Place of birth: Nottingham, England
- Height: 5 ft 10 in (1.78 m)
- Position: Defender

Team information
- Current team: Quorn

Youth career
- –2014: Wolverhampton Wanderers

Senior career*
Years	Team	Apps	(Gls)
2014–2015	Notts County	2	(0)
2015–2016	Nuneaton Town	31	(0)
2016–2017	Worcester City	37	(5)
2017	Kidderminster Harriers	4	(0)
2017–2018	Alfreton Town	25	(3)
2018	Boston United	2	(0)
2018–2019	→ Basford United (dual registration)	8	(0)
2019	Leamington	8	(0)
2019	Bradford Park Avenue	2	(0)
2019–2020	Basford United	9	(0)
2020–2021	Stafford Rangers	8	(0)
2021–2023	Gainsborough Trinity	30	(3)
2023	Long Eaton United	3	(0)
2023	Ilkeston Town	4	(0)
2023	→ Long Eaton United (loan)	3	(0)
2023–2024	Long Eaton United	17	(1)
2024	Barwell	2	(0)
2024–2025	Mickleover	20	(0)
2025–	Quorn	0	(0)

International career
2014	Republic of Ireland U19	10	(1)
- * Club domestic league appearances and goals as of 12:03, 20 June 2025 (UTC)

Cieron Macaully Keane (born 14 August 1996) is an Irish professional footballer who plays as a defender for Northern Premier League Premier Division club Quorn.

== Club career ==
Keane spent time at the Wolverhampton Wanderers youth team and signed his first scholarship in July 2012. However, after two years, Keane was released by the club in February 2014.

Following his release, Keane joined League One side Notts County in July 2014. He made his debut at Meadow Lane on 19 August 2014, and was sent off for two bookable offenses 71 minutes into a 2–1 victory over Colchester United. Keane made his return in his second appearance, in a 2–1 loss against Bristol City on 31 August 2014. At the end of the 2014–15 season, Keane was among ten players to be released by the club, following their relegation to League Two.

During August 2015, Keane was signed by National League North side Nuneaton Town along with his brother Jordan Keane. On 18 August 2015, he made his debut, coming on for Marlon Harewood in the 77th minute in a 0–1 win over Lowestoft Town Keane signed for Boston United Saturday 25 August.

On 25 September 2018, Keane signed for Basford United in the Northern Premier League on a dual registration from Boston United. After spells with Leamington and Bradford Park Avenue, Keane returned to Basford again in November 2019. On 25 May 2021, Keane joined Gainsborough Trinity.

In May 2023, Keane joined Long Eaton United ahead of the new season. Following manager Ian Deakin's departure to Ilkeston Town, the player followed in September 2023. On 1 November 2023, he returned to Long Eaton United on loan, later returning on a permanent basis.

In June 2024, Keane joined Barwell. In June 2025, he joined newly promoted Southern League Premier Division Central side Quorn.

== International career ==
Keane was called up by Republic of Ireland U19 in September 2014. Keane made his Republic of Ireland U19 debut against Netherlands U19.

== Personal life ==
His brothers, Kallum and Jordan, both spent brief periods with professional clubs before embarking on careers in non-league football.

== Career statistics ==
As of match played 29 August 2022

Appearances and goals by club, season and competition
Club	Season	League			FA Cup		Other		Total	
Club	Season	Division	Apps	Goals	Apps	Goals	Apps	Goals	Apps	Goals
Notts County	2014–15	League One	2	0	0	0	0	0	2	0
Nuneaton Town	2015–16	National League North	31	0	1	0	3 (Note: Two appearances in FA Trophy; one appearance in Birmingham Senior Cup)	0	35	0
Worcester City	2016–17	National League North	37	5	0	0	1 (Note: Appearance(s) in FA Trophy)	0	38	5
Kidderminster Harriers	2017–18	National League North	4	0	0	0	0	0	4	0
Alfreton Town	2017–18	National League North	25	3	0	0	0	0	25	3
Boston United	2018–19	National League North	2	0	0	0	0	0	2	0
Basford United (dual reg)	2018–19	Northern Premier League Premier DIvision	8	0	0	0	3	0	11	0
Leamington	2019–20	National League North	8	0	0	0	0	0	8	0
Bradford Park Avenue	2019–20	National League North	2	0	0	0	0	0	2	0
Basford United	2019–20	Northern Premier League Premier Division	9	0	0	0	1 (Note: Appearance(s) in Northern Premier League Challenge Cup)	0	10	0
Stafford Rangers	2020–21	Northern Premier League Premier Division	8	0	4	0	1	0	13	0
Gainsborough Trinity	2021–22	Northern Premier League Premier Division	29	3	1	0	1	0	31	3
Gainsborough Trinity	2022–23	Northern Premier League Premier Division	1	0	0	0	0	0	1	0
Gainsborough Trinity	Total		30	3	1	0	1	0	32	3
Barwell	2024–25	Southern League Premier Division Central	2	0	0	0	0	0	2	0
Mickleover	2024–25	Northern Premier League Premier Division	20	0	2	1	3 (Note: Two appearances in FA Trophy, one appearance in Derbyshire Senior Cup)	0	25	1
Career total			188	11	8	1	13	0	209	12
