= Genaro Snijders =

Dutch footballer (born 1989)

Personal information
- Full name: Genaro Rasan Snijders
- Date of birth: 29 July 1989 (age 37)
- Place of birth: Amsterdam, Netherlands
- Height: 1.68 m (5 ft 6 in)
- Position: Winger

Youth career
- JOS Watergraafsmeer
- Abcoude
- 2002–2007: AZ
- 2007–2008: Vitesse

Senior career*
Years	Team	Apps	(Gls)
2008–2012	Vitesse	23	(0)
2010	→ Omniworld (loan)	11	(3)
2012	→ Willem II (loan)	0	(0)
2012–2013	Willem II	23	(2)
2013–2014	Dordrecht	10	(2)
2014–2015	FC Oss	27	(3)
2015–2017	Notts County	19	(2)
2017–2018	DVS '33	4	(1)
2018–2019	DHSC	12	(3)
2020–2023	Abcoude		
- * Club domestic league appearances and goals

Genaro Rasan Snijders (born 29 July 1989) is a Dutch former professional footballer who played as a winger. After retiring from professional football, Snijders worked as an account manager for DTG, and became technical manager of FC Abcoude.

== Club career ==
=== Youth career ===
Born in Amsterdam, Netherlands, Snijders started his career at local amateur club JOS Watergraafsmeer. He moved to FC Abcoude as a youngster, an amateur club known for developing top class players like Edson Braafheid, Jeffrey Sarpong and Serginho Greene. Snijders was discovered by AZ, and joined their youth academy. Because of a conflict with Michel Doesburg, Snijders decided to leave for Vitesse's youth department, Vitesse/AGOVV. After a short time, he was promoted to the reserve squad. In 2008, he was picked for Vitesse's first team together with fellow team-mates Ricky van Wolfswinkel, Nicky Kuiper and Alexander Büttner.

=== Vitesse ===
During the 2008–09 Eredivisie campaign, Snijders primarily played for Vitesse's reserve team. However, in early 2009, the first team's coach, Theo Bos, selected him to play for the main squad. Snijders made his professional debut on 25 January 2009, in a derby against NEC, replacing Mads Junker in the 87th minute of the game, which ended in a 0–0 draw. On 9 March 2009, Snijders extended his expiring contract with Vitesse until 2011.

In 2010, Snijders was loaned out to FC Omniworld in the second division. During his stint with Omniworld, Snijders scored three goals in 11 appearances.

=== Willem II ===
In January 2012, Snijders was loaned out to Willem II. After the end of the 2011–12 season, he turned his loan switch into a permanent deal. However, he was released after one season, having played 23 matches in which he scored twice.

=== Dordrecht ===
In November 2013, Snijders signed a deal with Eerste Divisie side FC Dordrecht until the end of the season.

=== FC Oss ===
On 1 September 2014, Snijders signed a one-year deal with Eerste Divisie side FC Oss until the end of the season.

=== Notts County ===
In July 2015, Snijders signed for League Two side Notts County on a free transfer, signing a two-year contract. He scored in the League Cup against Aston Villa.

=== Later career ===
On 21 November 2017, Snijder signed for DVS '33 in the Derde Divisie. He left there in March 2018 and moved to DHSC in Utrecht. In May 2020, he decided to return to the club where he had started his youth career: FC Abcoude, in the capacity as both a player and assistant coach. He announced his definitive retirement from football in March 2023 to become technical manager of FC Abcoude.

== International ==
Snijders played once for the Unofficial Professional Suriname national football team and scored 1 goal against Curaçao in a 3–2 defeat.
