= Mathias Pogba =

Guinean footballer (born 1990)

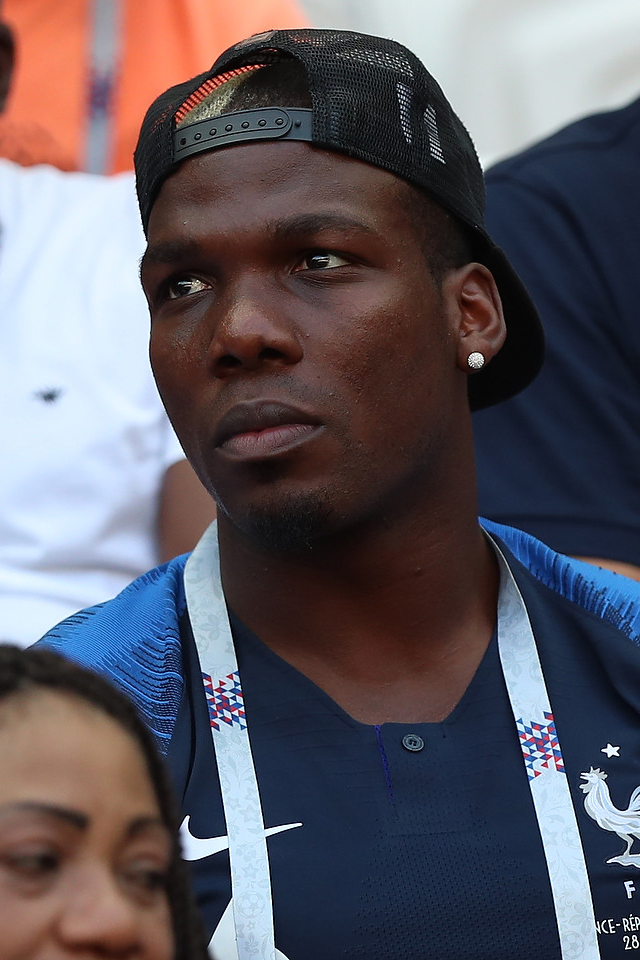
- Pogba at a 2018 FIFA World Cup match

Personal information
- Full name: Mathias Fassou Pogba
- Date of birth: 19 August 1990 (age 36)
- Place of birth: Conakry, Guinea
- Height: 1.91 m (6 ft 3 in)
- Position: Forward

Youth career
- 2007–2009: Celta

Senior career*
Years	Team	Apps	(Gls)
2009–2010	Quimper	19	(2)
2010–2012	Wrexham	66	(15)
2012–2014	Crewe Alexandra	56	(17)
2014–2015	Pescara	4	(0)
2015	Crawley Town	17	(2)
2015–2016	Partick Thistle	30	(2)
2016–2017	Sparta Rotterdam	14	(4)
2016–2017	Sparta Rotterdam B	2	(2)
2018–2019	Tours	5	(0)
2018–2019	Tours B	3	(2)
2019–2020	Manchego Ciudad Real	15	(2)
2020	Lorca	7	(3)
2020	Racing Murcia	0	(0)
2021	Tabor Sežana	1	(0)
2021–2022	Belfort	12	(0)

International career
2013–2017	Guinea	5	(0)
- * Club domestic league appearances and goals as of 18:15, 8 April 2022 (UTC)

Mathias Fassou Pogba (born 19 August 1990) is a Guinean former professional footballer who played as a forward. His twin brother Florentin and younger brother Paul are also professional footballers.

Having started his career as a youth at Celta Vigo, Pogba played briefly for Quimper in France before following his brother Paul to the United Kingdom, where he played for Wrexham and Crewe Alexandra. After four years in the English leagues, he moved to Italian Serie B side Pescara in 2014, but returned to England with Crawley Town only a few months later. After short spells at Scotland's Partick Thistle and in the Netherlands at Sparta Rotterdam, he joined Tours in September 2018. During the 2019–20 season, he played in Spain for both Manchego and Lorca. Pogba has also played five times for the Guinea national team since his debut in 2013.

In December 2024, Pogba was sentenced to three years in prison, with two years suspended, for attempted extortion of €13 million ($13.5 million) from his brother Paul Pogba.

== Club career ==
=== Early career ===
After growing up in Paris, Pogba joined the youth system at Spanish side Celta Vigo along with his twin brother Florentin. The pair left the club in 2009, with Pogba stating his time there was difficult due to language barriers, living abroad and being away from his family. He returned to France to join fourth division side Quimper, scoring twice in the league during one season at the club. While at the club, he lived with Algerian international Riyad Mahrez.

=== Wrexham ===
In September 2010, Pogba joined Conference National side Wrexham after a successful trial spell in August 2010.

Pogba made his Wrexham debut seven days later, coming on as a substitute for Curtis Obeng in the 75th minute, in a 0–0 draw against Fleetwood Town. It took until 3 January 2011 for Pogba to score his first Wrexham goal, in a 2–0 win over Bath City. Pogba then scored two goals in two games against Cambridge United and Mansfield Town. His fourth goal later came on 22 February 2011, in a 1–0 win over Wimbledon. His scoring form in January soon led Pogba to sign a new contract, keeping him at the club until 2012. Pogba made 29 appearances and scored four times in his first season at Wrexham.

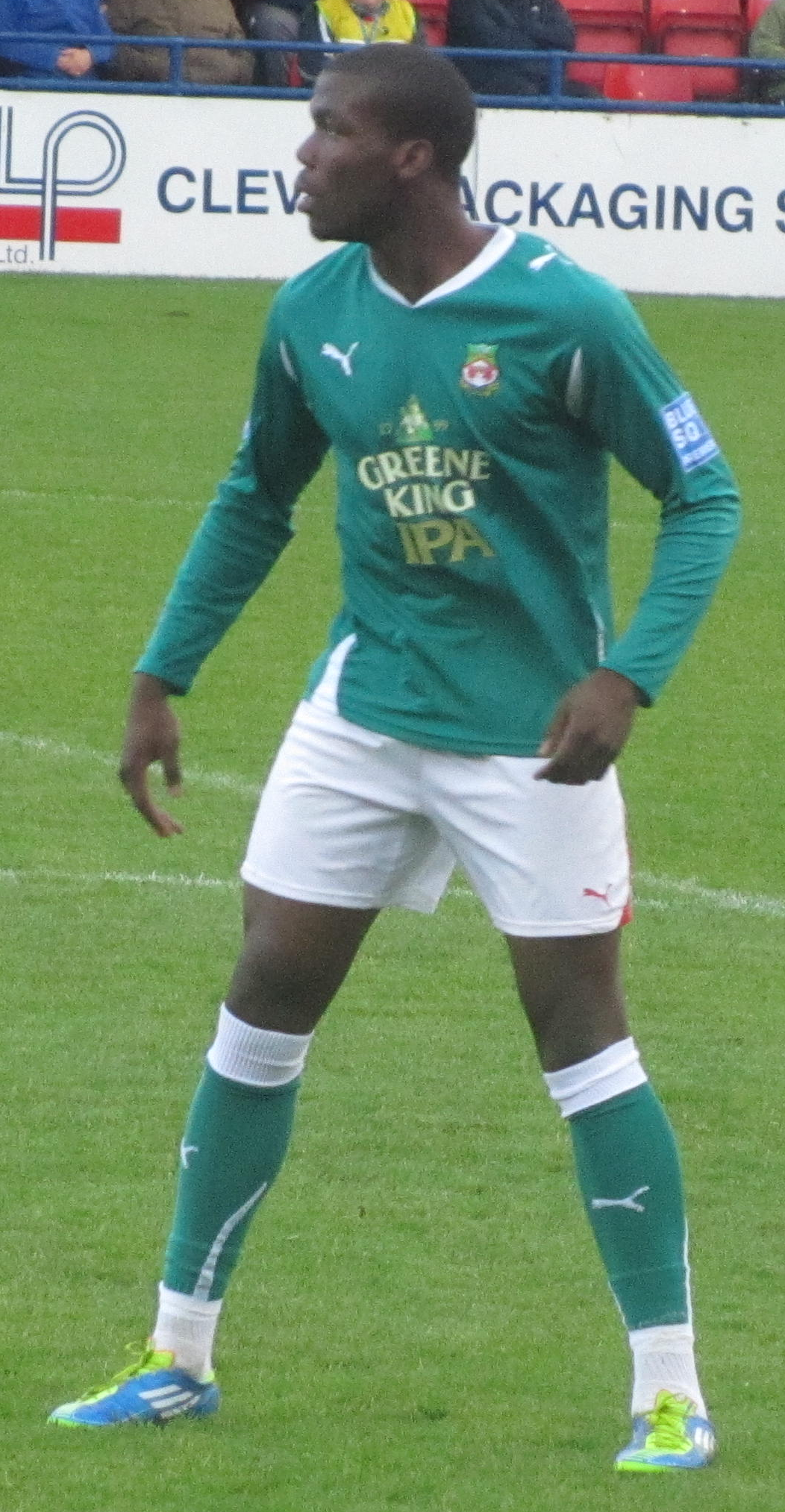
Pogba in 2011

In the 2011–12 season, Pogba played in the first two games, but was then dropped for two matches, due to an off-the-pitch issue. He returned to the first team against Alfreton Town and scored his first goal of the season in a 4–1 win. By the end of December, Pogba had scored a further six times (against Grimsby Town, Hayes & Yeading United, Luton Town, Lincoln City. and two against Gateshead) in 22 appearances. After being sidelined for two games due to fitness, Pogba made his return against Forest Green Rovers, only to be sidelined for the third time after suffering an ankle injury. On his return, Pogba scored in a 4–1 win over Hayes & Yeading United on 18 February 2012. He later added three more goals (against Ebbsfleet United, Darlington and Braintree Town). He was voted the club's young player of the year during the 2011–12 season.

Out of contract at the end of the year, Pogba was offered a new two-year deal by the club, which he rejected in a bid to play football at a higher level. Wrexham boss Andy Morrell criticised Pogba's handling of the situation, describing him as "disrespectful" to the club after not informing them of his intention to leave until 48-hours before the start of the club's pre-season.

=== Crewe Alexandra ===
After leaving Wrexham, Pogba signed for Crewe Alexandra on 7 July 2012 on a two-year deal. After scoring eight goals in 11 pre-season friendly matches, Pogba was given the number 9 shirt ahead of the new season.

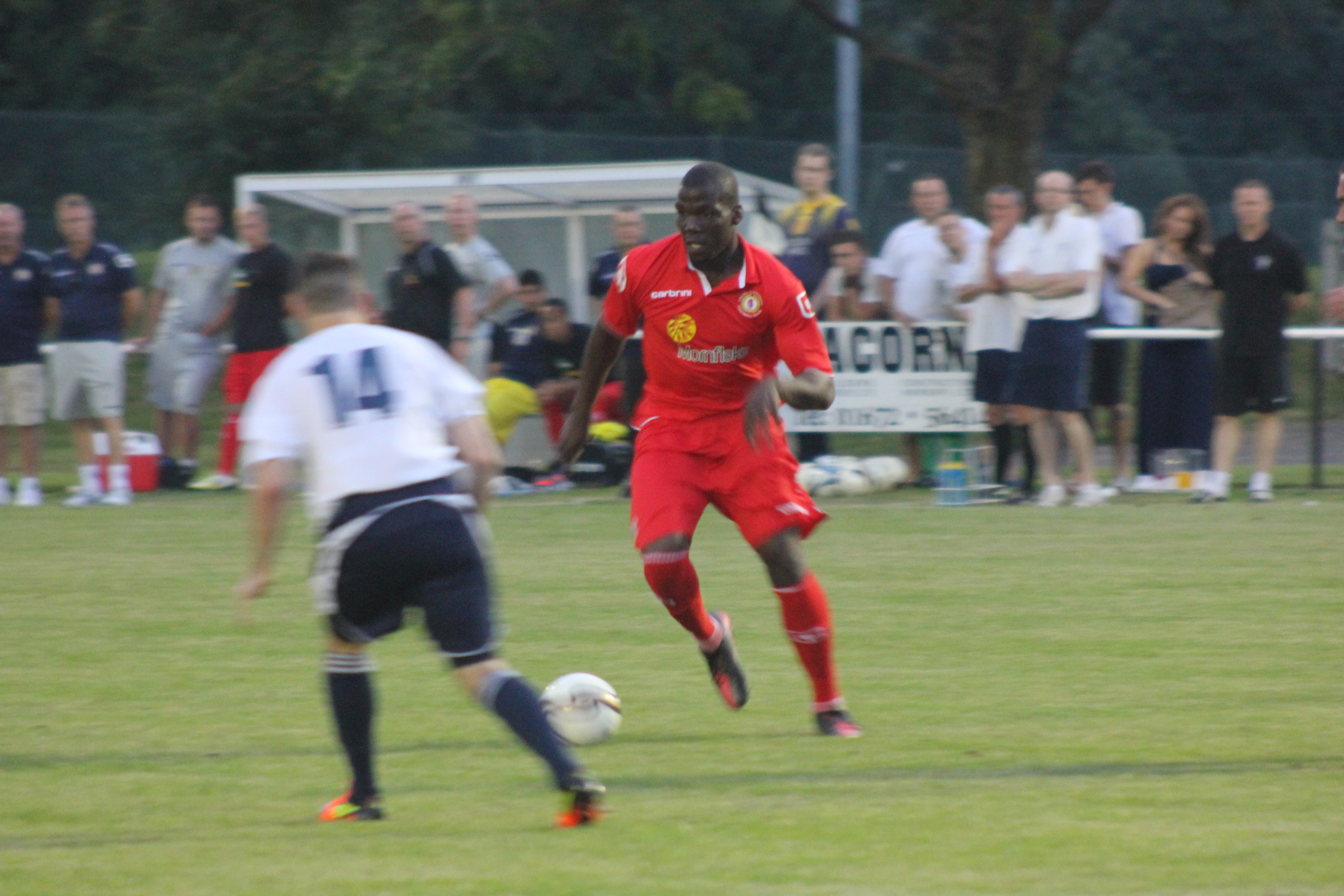
Pogba in 2012

Pogba quickly made an impact when he scored twice on his debut against Hartlepool in a League Cup first round tie on 11 August. A week later, he scored on his league debut, notching a 78th minute consolation in a 2–1 defeat to Notts County. He scored again two weeks later, in a 5–1 loss against Brentford. However, Pogba then suffered a knee injury that kept him out of action for most of September. He made his first team return, coming on as a substitute for A-Jay Leitch-Smith in the 62nd minute, in a 1–0 loss against Milton Keynes Dons on 29 September 2012. By the end of December, Pogba scored four more league goals (against Doncaster Rovers, Colchester United, Sheffield United and Oldham Athletic) in 20 appearances, plus two more goals in separate cup competitions against Wycombe Wanderers and Doncaster Rovers. After two months without scoring, Pogba ended his goal drought when he scored in a 2–1 loss against Bournemouth on 12 February 2013. Pogba later added four more goals - one each against Portsmouth, and Colchester United and a brace against MK Dons. However, Pogba suffered a torn thigh that sidelined him for the rest of the season, resulting him having an operation. Despite missing out for the Football League Trophy Final and the club's promotion to League One, Pogba made 41 appearances and scoring 16 times (making him the club's top scorer of the 2012–13 season) in all competitions.

Ahead of the 2013–14 season, the club's head physio Rob Sharp expected Pogba to be fit for the start of pre-season friendlies. Pogba was included in five pre-season matches still in shirt number 9. However, he sustained a medial ligament injury to his right knee during a 2–0 defeat to a Manchester United XI. It was announced that he would be out for at least three months. By the end of October, Pogba returned to light training under supervision from the club's head physio and conditioning coach. While regaining his fitness, Pogba signed a contract extension with the club, keeping him at the club until 2015. By the end of December, he returned to full training to maintain his fitness. Pogba made his first team return, coming on as a substitute for Leitch-Smith in the 62nd minute, in a 4–2 loss against Rotherham United on 11 January 2014. He then scored his first goal of the 2013–14 season, in a 3–3 draw against Bradford City on 8 February 2014 and scored two weeks later, in a 3–1 win over Port Vale. On 22 March 2014, he scored his third goal of the season, in a 3–1 win over Gillingham. Pogba later added two more goals towards the final month of the season (against Shrewsbury Town and Preston). Despite an injury-hit 2013–14 season, he made 22 appearances and scored five times.

Ahead of the 2014–15 season, manager Steve Davis was determined that Pogba could play as a central striker, but Pogba wanted to leave Crewe despite the club's attempt to persuade him to stay. Crewe accepted a bid from Pescara. Pogba later explained in The Guardian that he wanted to leave Crewe to step up to new challenges.

=== Pescara ===
Pogba signed for Serie B team Pescara in July 2014, joining his brother Paul of Juventus in Italy for an undisclosed fee. He made his Pescara debut on 28 September 2014, coming on as a substitute for Matteo Politano in the 84th minute, in a 2–1 loss against Catania. After six months at the club, Pogba was released by Pescara, after four appearances and no goals. He said that his time at Pescara was not good, as the manager Marco Baroni did not see him play and rarely talked.

=== Crawley Town ===
Pogba signed for League One team Crawley Town on 4 February 2015 after his release by Pescara. Three days after signing for the club, he made his Crawley Town debut, in a 2–1 loss against Yeovil Town. He scored his first goal for Crawley Town during a 4–3 defeat to Peterborough United on 25 April 2015, ending a 15-game run without scoring. Pogba scored once more in the last game of the season, a 2–1 defeat to Coventry City which resulted in Crawley's relegation from League One. Days later, he left the club.

=== Partick Thistle ===
On 3 August 2015, Pogba signed a one-year contract with Scottish Premiership side Partick Thistle, with an option to extend by a further year. He made his Partick Thistle debut, coming on as a substitute for Steven Lawless in the 50th minute, in a 2–1 loss against Celtic five days later. Pogba scored his first Partick Thistle goal in a 1–1 draw with Hamilton on 24 October 2015. He scored his second Partick Thistle goal against the same opponents on 19 March 2016, in a 2–1 victory at New Douglas Park.

Pogba scored his first goal of the 2016–17 season in a 4–1 Scottish League Cup win over Stenhousemuir. On 31 August 2016, he was released from his contract by mutual consent.

=== Sparta Rotterdam ===
On 31 August 2016, Pogba signed a one-year contract with Eredivisie side Sparta Rotterdam. He made his Sparta debut on 27 November 2016 in a 2–2 draw with Roda. Pogba scored his first goal for Sparta on 5 March 2017 in the first minute of the game against Feyenoord.

In August 2018, Pogba trialled with German third-tier side KFC Uerdingen. The trial, however, was cut short after one day with coach Stefan Krämer stating that Pogba, following an injury, was not in the physical shape required to be of any help to the club.

=== Tours ===
In September 2018, Pogba joined French third-tier side Tours.

=== Manchego ===
On 28 July 2019, Pogba completed a move to Spain's Manchego; a team in the Castilla–La Mancha group of the Tercera División.

=== Lorca ===
On 1 January 2020, Pogba moved to Lorca. He was released six months later, on 1 July 2020.

=== Racing Murcia ===
On 7 August 2020, Pogba signed for Spanish Tercera División side Racing Murcia.

=== Tabor Sežana ===
On 16 February 2021, Pogba joined Slovenian PrvaLiga team Tabor Sežana for the remainder of the 2020–21 season.

=== Belfort ===
On 10 August 2021, Pogba joined Championnat National 2 team Belfort for the 2021–22 season.

== International career ==
Pogba made his debut for Guinea in an international friendly against Senegal in Paris on 5 February 2013. He came off the bench to play alongside twin brother Florentin Pogba for the final 30 minutes of Guinea's 1–1 draw.

== Personal life ==
Pogba has two brothers who are also professional footballers. His twin brother, Florentin, plays for Belgian side R.E. Virton. His younger brother, Paul has played for the France national team.

The Pogba brothers grew up in Paris. Mathias and Paul lived together while playing for Wrexham and Manchester United respectively. Mathias was at the Stade de France watching his brother Paul play an international friendly against Germany when the Paris attacks occurred on 13 November 2015.

In 2022, he was charged and detained over an alleged plot to extort money from his brother Paul, the France and Juventus midfielder. Paul filed a complaint with Turin prosecutors on 16 July 2022 claiming he was the target of a €13 million (£11.29 million) blackmail plot. Mathias Pogba was detained in September 2022 in connection with the case before being released under judicial review on 23 December 2022. In June 2024, French prosecutors called for Pogba and fellow defendants to face trial on kidnap charges. In December 2024, Mathias Pogba was sentenced to three years in prison, with two years suspended, for the attempted extortion; he will serve a one-year sentence with an electronic bracelet rather than in prison. He was also fined €20,000. Five other defendants received sentences of up to eight years.

== Honours ==
Crewe Alexandra

- Football League Trophy: 2012–13
