= 2014–15 Aston Villa F.C. season =

English football club season

Aston Villa
2014–15 season
- Chairman: Randy Lerner
- Manager: Paul Lambert (until 11 February 2015); Tim Sherwood (from 14 February 2015)
- Stadium: Villa Park
- Premier League: 17th
- FA Cup: Runners-up
- League Cup: Second round
- Top goalscorer: League: Christian Benteke (13); All: Christian Benteke (15)
Home colours	Away colours	Third colours

The 2014-15 season was Aston Villa's 23rd season in the Premier League. The 2014–15 Premier League season was Villa's 140th season in English football. It was the club's 23rd season in the Premier League and 27th consecutive season in the top flight of English football. Villa participated in the FA Cup (reaching the final) and League Cup. The club was managed by Paul Lambert, until his sacking on 11 February 2015. He was replaced by Tim Sherwood on 14 February.

Lambert's third season had seen a different approach in the transfer market, with him opting to buy players with experience as opposed to the previous seasons, where the club would sign young prospects. Villa started well, with a 1–0 victory over Stoke City. This was followed by a 0–0 draw against Newcastle United, a 2–1 win over Hull City and a 1–0 victory over Liverpool. During this time, the new back four of Alan Hutton, Ron Vlaar, Philippe Senderos and Aly Cissokho were praised by the manager having gainied three clean sheets out of a possible four, whilst gaining ten points out of an available 12. However, the team then went on to have a five-game long goal drought, losing to Arsenal, Chelsea, Manchester City, Everton and QPR before scoring in a 2–1 loss at Villa Park to Tottenham. Villa then went on to gain some valuable points, drawing 0–0 with West Ham and 1–1 against Southampton. They then won 1–0 against Crystal Palace at Selhurst Park, courtesy of a Christian Benteke goal, followed with a 2–1 victory over Leicester City at Villa Park. On 11 February, Villa announced they had parted company with Lambert after a 2–0 loss at Hull, leaving the club 18th in the Premier League table.

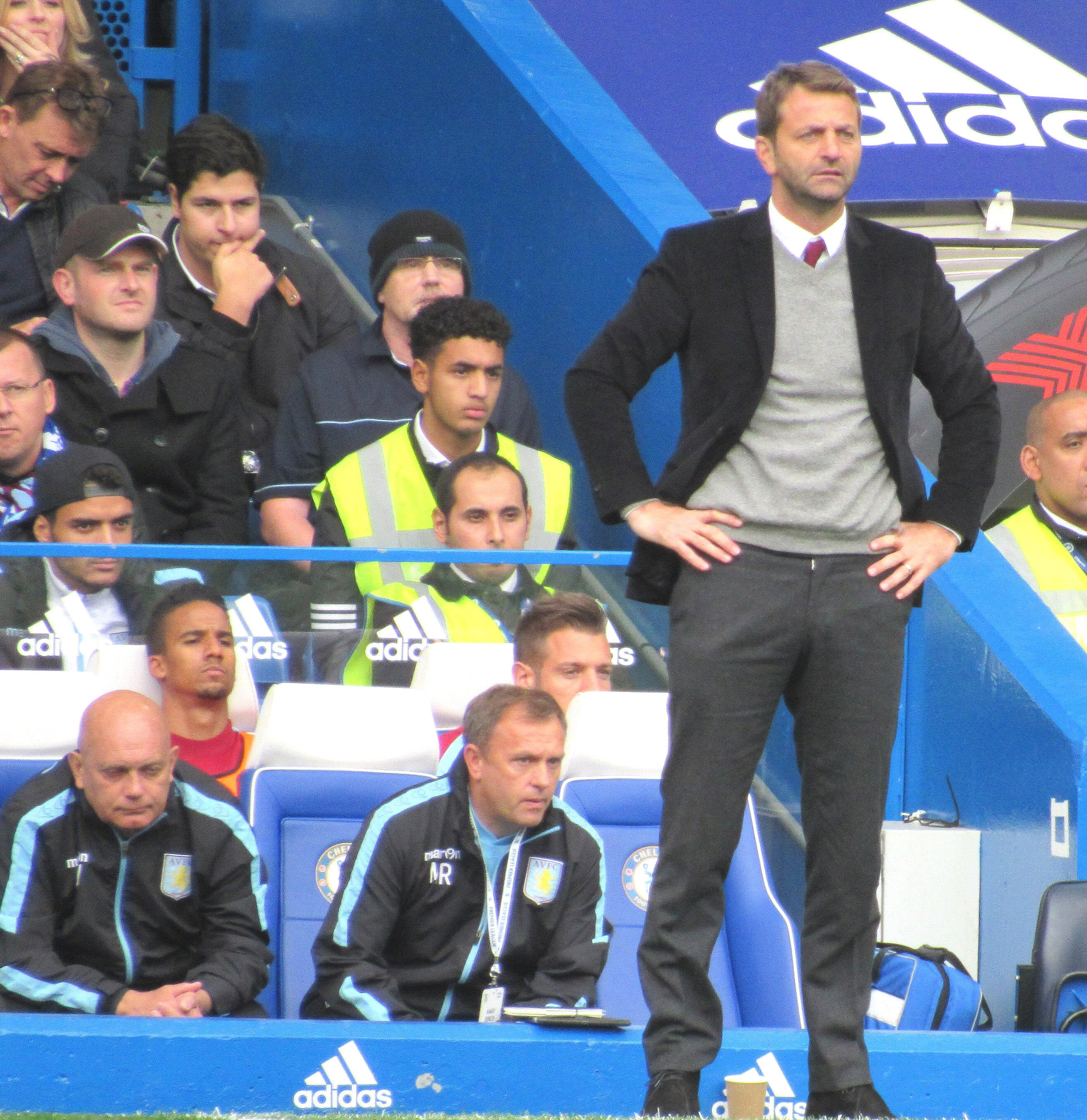
Sherwood managing Aston Villa in 2015

On 14 February 2015, the club's official Twitter page announced the appointment of Tim Sherwood as new manager. Sherwood attended the following day's 2–1 win over Leicester City in the FA Cup and gave a half-time team-talk, his first game in official control of the team was at home to Stoke City almost a week later. Villa lost the game 2–1 after a 93rd-minute penalty from Victor Moses. After also losing his second game in charge, this time going down 1–0 to Newcastle United, Sherwood's first win came on 3 March 2015 against West Midlands rivals West Bromwich Albion. The game finished 2–1, with Christian Benteke scoring a last-minute penalty, which shadowed the decision that went against Villa in the Stoke game. Sherwood led Villa to Wembley for the first time since 2010 just four days later, after winning 2–0 in the FA cup quarter-final again against West Bromwich Albion. Sherwood then led Villa to a third straight win, a 4–0 away win over relegation rivals Sunderland in which all goals were scored in the first half. On 19 April 2015, Aston Villa reached the FA Cup Final for the first time since 2000, coming from behind to defeat Liverpool 2–1 in their semi-final at Wembley. However, they went on to lose the final 4–0 to Arsenal.

== Key events ==
- 12 May 2014: Randy Lerner announces that he has put the club up for sale after eight years of ownership.
- 20 May: Academy graduates Marc Albrighton and Nathan Delfouneso are both released from the club.
- 5 June: The club makes its first summer signing with former Arsenal and Fulham defender Philippe Senderos agreeing to join the club on a free transfer from Valencia.
- 10 June: Joe Cole joins the club on a free transfer.
- 1 July: Roy Keane is appointed as the new assistant manager to Paul Lambert, following the dismissal of Ian Culverhouse towards the end of the previous season.
- 8 July: Chief executive officer Paul Faulkner steps down from his role after failing to reach an agreement on a new non-operational role at the club.
- 11 July: Kieran Richardson signs for a fee believed to be £600,000 from relegated Fulham.
- 8 August: Aly Cissokho joins on a four-year deal from Valencia.
- 15 August: Colombian Carlos Sánchez arrives at the club for a fee believed to be £4.7 million.
- 16 August: Villa win 1–0 against Stoke City in the first match of the new season.
- 21 August: Tom Fox is appointed as the club's new CEO, after five years as Chief Commercial Officer at Arsenal.
- 27 August: Villa are knocked out of the League Cup after a 1–0 home defeat to Leyton Orient of League One.
- 2 September: Villa complete a season-long loan for Tom Cleverley from Manchester United, with a view to a permanent move.
- 17 September: Paul Lambert signs a new contract committing himself to the club until 2018.
- 4 October: Christian Benteke makes his return after six months out with a ruptured achilles tendon, coming on as a substitute in a 2–0 defeat to Manchester City.
- 2 November: For the first time since 1967, the club suffers its sixth straight league defeat after losing 2–1 at home to Tottenham Hotspur.
- 28 November: Roy Keane leaves his role as assistant manager with immediate effect.
- 13 January 2015: Carles Gil becomes Villa's first January signing after joining the club on a four-and-half year deal.
- 30 January: Scott Sinclair joins on loan until the end of the season, with a view to a permanent move.
- 1 February: A 5–0 defeat at Arsenal sees Villa go six league matches (612 minutes) without scoring.
- 10 February: Villa fall into the drop-zone for the time in the season, after losing 2–0 away to relegation rivals Hull City. This prompts angry scenes from the travelling support towards the manager.
- 11 February: Paul Lambert is sacked as manager 24 hours after defeat to Hull.
- 14 February: Tim Sherwood is appointed as the new manager of the club. However, his first match in charge ends in defeat against Stoke City (21 February).
- 28 February: Villa lose 1–0 to Newcastle United condemning them to a seventh consecutive defeat, beating the six recorded earlier in the season.
- 3 March: The run of defeats is eventually ended courtesy of a 2–1 victory over local rivals West Bromwich Albion.
- 7 March: Villa reach Wembley for the first time since 2010 after beating their rivals for the second time in a week. West Bromwich Albion go down 2–0 at Villa Park in the FA Cup quarter-finals.
- 14 March: The club records its biggest victory of the season, 4–0 away against Sunderland. All four goals were scored before half-time.
- 7 April: Christian Benteke scores a hat-trick to salvage a 3–3 draw against fellow relegation candidates Queens Park Rangers.
- 11 April: Villa beat Tottenham Hotspur 1–0 at White Hart Lane in Tim Sherwood's first game against his former employers.
- 20 April: The club reaches the FA Cup Final after a 2–1 win against Liverpool at Wembley Stadium. Christian Benteke and Fabian Delph scored the goals to take Villa to the prestigious final for the first time since 2000.
- 16 May: Despite being thrashed 6–1 at Southampton, Villa's Premier League safety is confirmed after Hull City lose to Tottenham Hotspur.
- 24 May: Villa end the season in 17th place in the Premier League, their second lowest finish since its inception, after a final day defeat to already relegated Burnley.

== Players ==
Squad No.	Name	Nationality	Position	Date of birth (age)	Apps.	Goals	Notes
Goalkeepers
1	Brad Guzan	(United States)	GK	9 September 1984 (aged 29)	140	0	
13	Jed Steer	(England)	GK	23 September 1992 (aged 21)	4	0	
31	Shay Given	(Republic of Ireland)	GK	20 April 1976 (aged 38)	52	0	
Defenders
2	Nathan Baker	(England)	CB / LB	23 April 1991 (aged 23)	86	0	
3	Joe Bennett	(England)	LB	28 March 1990 (aged 24)	37	0	
4	Ron Vlaar	(Netherlands)	CB	16 February 1985 (aged 29)	87	2	
5	Jores Okore	(Denmark)	CB	11 August 1992 (aged 21)	31	1	
6	Ciaran Clark	(Republic of Ireland)	CB / LB	26 September 1989 (aged 24)	136	8	
14	Philippe Senderos	(Switzerland)	CB	14 February 1985 (aged 29)	10	0	
21	Alan Hutton	(Scotland)	RB	30 November 1984 (aged 29)	68	1	
23	Aly Cissokho	(France)	LB	15 September 1987 (aged 26)	27	0	
32	Janoi Donacien	(Saint Lucia)	CB / RB	3 November 1993 (aged 20)	0	0	
34	Matthew Lowton	(England)	RB	9 June 1989 (aged 25)	82	2	
35	Enda Stevens	(Republic of Ireland)	LB	9 July 1990 (aged 24)	9	0	
–	Antonio Luna	(Spain)	LB	17 March 1991 (aged 23)	18	1	On loan at Spezia Calcio.
Midfielders
7	Leandro Bacuna	(Curaçao)	CM / RB / RWB	21 August 1991 (aged 22)	63	6	
8	Tom Cleverley	(England)	CM / AM	12 August 1989 (aged 24)	36	3	On loan from Manchester United.
9	Scott Sinclair	(England)	LW / RW	25 March 1989 (aged 25)	12	3	
12	Joe Cole	(England)	AM	8 November 1981 (aged 32)	15	1	
15	Ashley Westwood	(England)	CM	1 April 1990 (aged 24)	101	3	
16	Fabian Delph (captain)	(England)	CM	21 November 1989 (aged 24)	133	8	
17	Chris Herd	(Australia)	CM / CB / RB	4 April 1989 (aged 25)	42	2	
18	Kieran Richardson	(England)	LW / LB	21 October 1984 (aged 29)	25	0	
22	Gary Gardner	(England)	CM	29 June 1992 (aged 22)	18	0	
24	Carlos Sánchez	(Colombia)	DM	6 February 1986 (aged 28)	32	1	
25	Carles Gil	(Spain)	AM / RW	22 November 1992 (aged 21)	7	1	
28	Charles N'Zogbia	(France)	LW / AM	28 May 1986 (aged 28)	90	5	
39	Riccardo Calder	(England)	LW	26 January 1996 (aged 18)	0	0	
40	Jack Grealish	(England)	LW / AM	10 September 1995 (aged 18)	24	0	
–	Yacouba Sylla	(Mali)	DM	29 November 1990 (aged 23)	24	0	On loan at Kayseri Erciyesspor.
–	Aleksandar Tonev	(Bulgaria)	LW / RW	3 February 1990 (aged 24)	20	0	On loan at Celtic.
Forwards
10	Andreas Weimann	(Austria)	ST / LW / RW	5 August 1991 (aged 22)	129	24	
11	Gabriel Agbonlahor	(England)	ST / LW / RW	13 October 1986 (aged 27)	352	83	
19	Darren Bent	(England)	ST	6 February 1984 (aged 30)	72	25	
20	Christian Benteke	(Belgium)	ST	3 December 1990 (aged 23)	100	49	
27	Libor Kozák	(Czech Republic)	ST	30 May 1989 (aged 25)	15	4	
29	Rushian Hepburn-Murphy	(England)	ST	19 September 1998 (aged 15)	1	0	
37	Callum Robinson	(England)	ST	2 February 1995 (aged 19)	5	0	
38	Graham Burke	(Republic of Ireland)	ST	21 September 1993 (aged 20)	2	0	
–	Nicklas Helenius	(Denmark)	ST / RW	8 May 1991 (aged 23)	6	1	On loan at Aalborg BK.

Last updated: 25 May 2015.
Source: Soccerbase

=== Transfers ===
==== In ====
Summer

Date	Position	Player name	Old club	League	Transfer fee	Notes	Source
5 June 2014	DF	(Switzerland) Philippe Senderos	(Spain) Valencia	(Spain) La Liga	Free transfer	Officially joined on 1/7/14, after release from Valencia.	
10 June 2014	MF	(England) Joe Cole	(England) West Ham United	(England) Premier League	Free transfer	Officially joined on 1/7/14, after release from West Ham.	
11 July 2014	MF	(England) Kieran Richardson	(England) Fulham	(England) Championship	£600,000		
8 August 2014	DF	(France) Aly Cissokho	(Spain) Valencia	(Spain) La Liga	£2,000,000^{1}		
15 August 2014	MF	(Colombia) Carlos Sánchez	(Spain) Elche	(Spain) La Liga	£4,700,000^{1}		

Winter/Spring

Date	Position	Player name	Old club	League	Transfer fee	Notes	Source
13 January 2015	MF	(Spain) Carles Gil	(Spain) Valencia	(Spain) La Liga	£3,200,000^{1}		
19 May 2015	MF	(England) Scott Sinclair	(England) Manchester City	(England) Premier League	£2,600,000^{1}	Originally a loan, made into a permanent move.	

==== Out ====
Summer

Date	Position	Player name	New club	League	Transfer fee	Notes	Source
20 May 2014	MF	(England) Marc Albrighton	(England) Leicester City	(England) Premier League	Free transfer	Signed for Leicester on 23/5/14 after release.	
20 May 2014	FW	(England) Nathan Delfouneso	(England) Blackpool	(England) Championship	Free transfer	Signed for Blackpool on 29/7/14 after release.	
10 June 2014	FW	(England) Jordan Bowery	(England) Rotherham United	(England) Championship	£250,000		
6 August 2014	MF	(Republic of Ireland) Samir Carruthers	(England) MK Dons	(England) League One	£220,000		
1 September 2014	MF	(Morocco) Karim El Ahmadi	(Netherlands) Feyenoord	(Netherlands) Eredivisie	£320,000^{1}		

^{1}Fee officially undisclosed

Winter

Date	Position	Player name	New club	League	Transfer fee	Source
23 January 2015	MF	(Jamaica) Daniel Johnson	(England) Preston North End	(England) League One	£50,000^{1}	

=== Loans ===
==== In ====
Summer

Date	Position	Player name	Club	League	Duration	Return Date	Source
2 September 2014	MF	(England) Tom Cleverley	(England) Manchester United	(England) Premier League	Season-long	30 June 2015	

Winter

Date	Position	Player name	Club	League	Duration	Return Date	Notes	Source
30 January 2015	MF	(England) Scott Sinclair	(England) Manchester City	(England) Premier League	5 months	19 May 2015	Move was made permanent on 19/5/15.	

==== Out ====
Summer

Date	Position	Player name	Club	League	Duration	Return Date	Notes	Source
9 July 2014	FW	(Denmark) Nicklas Helenius	(Denmark) Aalborg BK	(Denmark) Danish Superliga	Season-long	30 June 2015		
1 August 2014	GK	(England) Jed Steer	(England) Doncaster Rovers	(England) League One	3 months	1 November 2014		
4 August 2014	DF	(Spain) Antonio Luna	(Italy) Verona	(Italy) Serie A	6 months	2 February 2015	Loan originally season-long but cut short in February.	
6 August 2014	MF	(Mali) Yacouba Sylla	(Turkey) Kayseri Erciyesspor	(Turkey) Süper Lig	Season-long	30 June 2015		
8 August 2014	MF	(Jamaica) Daniel Johnson	(England) Chesterfield	(England) League One	3 months	8 November 2014		
11 August 2014	MF	(Bulgaria) Aleksandar Tonev	(Scotland) Celtic	(Scotland) Scottish Premiership	Season-long	30 June 2015		
18 August 2014	DF	(Saint Lucia) Janoi Donacien	(England) Tranmere Rovers	(England) League Two	Season-long	30 June 2015		
20 August 2014	DF	(England) Joe Bennett	(England) Brighton & Hove Albion	(England) Championship	Season-long	30 June 2015		
26 August 2014	MF	(England) Gary Gardner	(England) Brighton & Hove Albion	(England) Championship	4 months	1 January 2015		

Winter/Spring

Date	Pos	Player name	Club	League	Duration	Return Date	Notes	Source
16 September 2014	FW	(England) Callum Robinson	(England) Preston North End	(England) League One	2 months	26 November 2014		
23 September 2014	MF	(Australia) Chris Herd	(England) Bolton Wanderers	(England) Championship	1.5 months	8 November 2014		
10 October 2014	DF	(Republic of Ireland) Enda Stevens	(England) Northampton Town	(England) League Two	1 month	6 November 2014		
31 October 2014	GK	(England) Jed Steer	(England) Yeovil Town	(England) League One	2 months	31 January 2015		
6 November 2014	DF	(Republic of Ireland) Enda Stevens	(England) Doncaster Rovers	(England) League One	7 months	30 June 2015		
10 November 2014	MF	(Jamaica) Daniel Johnson	(England) Oldham Athletic	(England) League One	2 months	5 January 2015		
26 November 2014	FW	(England) Darren Bent	(England) Brighton & Hove Albion	(England) Championship	1 month	29 December 2014		
2 January 2015	FW	(England) Darren Bent	(England) Derby County	(England) Championship	4.5 months	30 June 2015		
10 January 2015	MF	(England) Gary Gardner	(England) Nottingham Forest	(England) Championship	4.5 months	30 June 2015		
26 January 2015	DF	(Australia) Chris Herd	(England) Wigan Athletic	(England) Championship	1 month	30 June 2015	Player returned early due to injury,	
2 February 2015	DF	(Spain) Antonio Luna	(Italy) Spezia	(Italy) Serie B	5 months	30 June 2015		
2 February 2015	FW	(England) Callum Robinson	(England) Preston North End	(England) League One	3 months	11 May 2015		
26 March 2015	FW	(Republic of Ireland) Graham Burke	(England) Notts County	(England) League One	2 months	30 June 2015		
26 March 2015	DF	(England) Lewis Kinsella	(England) Luton Town	(England) League Two	2 months	30 June 2015		

== Competitions ==
=== Pre-season and friendlies ===
17 July 2014	Mansfield Town	1–3	Aston Villa	Mansfield
19:45 BST	Fisher 41'	Report	Bent 61', 90'; Gardner 85'	Stadium: Field Mill; Attendance: 3,432

23 July 2014	FC Dallas (United States)	0–2	Aston Villa	Frisco, Texas
20:10 CDT; 02:10 BST		Report	Weimann 44'; N'Zogbia 48'; Delph (yellow card) 62'; Clark (yellow card) 81'	Stadium: Toyota Stadium

26 July 2014	Houston Dynamo (United States)	0–1	Aston Villa	Houston, Texas
20:10 CDT; 02:10 BST		Report	Herd (yellow card) 40'; Bennett 41'; Westwood (yellow card) 83'	Stadium: BBVA Compass Stadium; Attendance: 20,514

30 July 2014	Chesterfield	3–1	Aston Villa	Chesterfield
19:45 BST	Darikwa 6'; Hird 43'; Morsy 85'	Report	Grealish 51'	Stadium: Proact Stadium; Attendance: 3,740

2 August 2014	Groningen (Netherlands)	4–1	Aston Villa	Groningen
17:00 CEST; 19:00 BST	Chery 5', 8'; Antonia 32'; Islamović 90'	Report	N'Zogbia 76'	Stadium: Euroborg Stadium

5 August 2014	Walsall	0–1	Aston Villa	Walsall
19:30 BST		Report	Hutton 28'	Stadium: Banks's Stadium; Attendance: 6,559

9 August 2014	Aston Villa	0–0	(Italy) Parma	Birmingham
15:00 BST	Baker (yellow card) 17'	Report		Stadium: Villa Park

=== Premier League ===
==== League table ====
Pos	Team	Pld	W	D	L	GF	GA	GD	Pts	Qualification or relegation
15	Newcastle United	38	10	9	19	40	63	−23	39	
16	Sunderland	38	7	17	14	31	53	−22	38	
17	Aston Villa	38	10	8	20	31	57	−26	38	
18	Hull City (R)	38	8	11	19	33	51	−18	35	Relegation to Football League Championship
19	Burnley (R)	38	7	12	19	28	53	−25	33	Relegation to Football League Championship

Source: Barclays Premier League
Rules for classification: 1) Points; 2) Goal difference; 3) Goals scored; 4) Play-offs (only if needed to decide champion, teams for relegation or teams for UEFA competitions).
(R) Relegated

==== Result summary ====
Overall								Home						Away					
Pld	W	D	L	GF	GA	GD	Pts	W	D	L	GF	GA	GD	W	D	L	GF	GA	GD
38	10	8	20	31	57	−26	38	5	6	8	18	25	−7	5	2	12	13	32	−19

Last updated: 25 May 2015.
Source: Statto.com

==== Results by matchday ====
Matchday	1	2	3	4	5	6	7	8	9	10	11	12	13	14	15	16	17	18	19	20	21	22	23	24	25	26	27	28	29	30	31	32	33	34	35	36	37	38
Ground	A	H	H	A	H	A	H	A	A	H	A	H	A	A	H	A	H	A	H	H	A	H	A	H	A	H	A	H	H	H	A	H	A	A	H	H	A	H
Result	W	D	W	W	L	L	L	L	L	L	D	D	D	W	W	L	D	L	D	D	L	L	L	L	L	L	L	W	W	L	L	D	W	L	W	W	L	L
Position	3	4	3	2	3	6	7	11	15	15	16	16	16	12	11	12	12	13	13	12	13	14	16	16	18	19	19	17	16	16	16	16	15	15	14	14	15	17

Updated to match(es) played on 25 May 2015. Source: Statto.com
A = Away; H = Home; W = Win; D = Draw; L = Loss

==== Matches ====
Win Draw Loss Postponed

16 August 2014 1	Stoke City	0–1	Aston Villa	Stoke-on-Trent
15:00 BST		Report	Westwood (yellow card) 14'; Weimann 50'; Hutton (yellow card) 80'; Agbonlahor (yellow card) 86'	Stadium: Britannia Stadium; Attendance: 27,478; Referee: Anthony Taylor

23 August 2014 2	Aston Villa	0–0	Newcastle United	Birmingham
12:45 BST	N'Zogbia (yellow card) 50'; Senderos (yellow card) 67'; Weimann (yellow card) 68'; Sánchez (yellow card) 85'	Report	Williamson (yellow card) 86' (yellow-red card) 90'	Stadium: Villa Park; Attendance: 30,267; Referee: Mike Dean

31 August 2014 3	Aston Villa	2–1	Hull City	Birmingham
13:30 BST	Agbonlahor 14'; Weimann 36'; Guzan (yellow card) 90'	Report	Davies (yellow card) 42'; Jelavić 74', (yellow card) 82'; Elmohamady (yellow card) 84'; Quinn (yellow card) 87'	Stadium: Villa Park; Attendance: 28,336; Referee: Mark Clattenburg

13 September 2014 4	Liverpool	0–1	Aston Villa	Liverpool
17:30 BST	Lallana (yellow card) 12'; Moreno (yellow card) 76'	Report	Agbonlahor 9'; Hutton (yellow card) 63'	Stadium: Anfield; Attendance: 44,689; Referee: Lee Mason

20 September 2014 5	Aston Villa	0–3	Arsenal	Birmingham
15:00 BST	Clark (yellow card) 83'	Report	Chambers (yellow card) 22'; Özil 32'; Welbeck 34'; Cissokho 36' (o.g.); Ramsey (yellow card) 56'; Wilshere (yellow card) 84'	Stadium: Villa Park; Attendance: 40,013; Referee: Mike Jones

27 September 2014 6	Chelsea	3–0	Aston Villa	Fulham
15:00 BST	Oscar 7'; Cahill (yellow card) 26'; Fàbregas (yellow card) 58'; Costa 59'; Willian 79'	Report	Cleverley (yellow card) 51'; Senderos (yellow card) 62'	Stadium: Stamford Bridge; Attendance: 41,616; Referee: Phil Dowd

4 October 2014 7	Aston Villa	0–2	Manchester City	Birmingham
17:30 BST		Report	Kolarov (yellow card) 24'; Touré 82'; Agüero 88'	Stadium: Villa Park; Attendance: 32,964; Referee: Chris Foy

18 October 2014 8	Everton	3–0	Aston Villa	Liverpool
15:00 BST	Jagielka 18'; Lukaku 48'; Barry (yellow card) 61'; Naismith (yellow card) 71'; Coleman 76'	Report	Richardson (yellow card) 7'; Agbonlahor (yellow card) 36'	Stadium: Goodison Park; Attendance: 39,505; Referee: Anthony Taylor

27 October 2014 9	Queens Park Rangers	2–0	Aston Villa	Shepherd's Bush
20:00 GMT	Austin 17', 69'	Report	Weimann (yellow card) 58'; Lowton (yellow card) 77'	Stadium: Loftus Road; Attendance: 18,002; Referee: Lee Mason

2 November 2014 10	Aston Villa	1–2	Tottenham Hotspur	Birmingham
16:00 GMT	Weimann 16', (yellow card) 70'; Cissokho (yellow card) 38'; Benteke (red card) 65'; Sánchez (yellow card) 89'	Report	Eriksen (yellow card) 25'; Vertonghen (yellow card) 61'; Chadli (yellow card) 80' (goal) 84'; Kane 90'	Stadium: Villa Park; Attendance: 32,049; Referee: Neil Swarbrick

8 November 2014 11	West Ham United	0–0	Aston Villa	Upton Park
15:00 GMT		Report	Cleverley (yellow card) 69'; Weimann (yellow card) 69'; Agbonlahor (yellow card) 89'	Stadium: Upton Park; Attendance: 34,857; Referee: Jonathan Moss

24 November 2014 12	Aston Villa	1–1	Southampton	Birmingham
20:00 GMT	Agbonlahor 29'; Okore (yellow card) 72'	Report	Wanyama (yellow card) 58'; Clyne 81', (yellow card) 83'	Stadium: Villa Park; Attendance: 25,311; Referee: Phil Dowd

29 November 2014 13	Burnley	1–1	Aston Villa	Burnley
15:00 GMT	Kightly (yellow card) 28'; Marney (yellow card) 38'; Barnes (yellow card) 45+1'; Ings 87' (pen.)	Report	Cole 38'; Cleverley (yellow card) 41'; Hutton (yellow card) 45'; Okore (yellow card) 86'; Clark (yellow card) 87'	Stadium: Turf Moor; Attendance: 19,910; Referee: Graham Scott

2 December 2014 14	Crystal Palace	0–1	Aston Villa	Selhurst
20:00 GMT	Campbell (yellow card) 57'; Bolasie (yellow card) 81'	Report	Benteke 32'; Clark (yellow card) 82'; Weimann (yellow card) 90+2'	Stadium: Selhurst Park; Attendance: 23,935; Referee: Michael Oliver

7 December 2014 15	Aston Villa	2–1	Leicester City	Birmingham
16:00 GMT	Clark 17'; N'Zogbia (yellow card) 34'; Hutton 71', (yellow card) 81'; Sánchez (yellow card) 75'; Agbonlahor (yellow card) 90'	Report	Ulloa 13'; Vardy (yellow card) 41'; Cambiasso (yellow card) 59'; Schlupp (yellow card) 60'; Wasilewski (yellow card) 71'; Konchesky (red card) 80'	Stadium: Villa Park; Attendance: 27,692; Referee: Craig Pawson

13 December 2014 16	West Bromwich Albion	1–0	Aston Villa	West Bromwich
15:00 GMT	McAuley (yellow card) 18'; Pocognoli (yellow card) 63'; Gardner 72' (yellow card) 90+5'; Varela (yellow card) 78'	Report	Richardson (red card) 22'; Cleverley (yellow card) 42'; Hutton (yellow card) 65'	Stadium: The Hawthorns; Attendance: 24,684; Referee: Mike Dean

20 December 2014 17	Aston Villa	1–1	Manchester United	Birmingham
15:00 GMT	Benteke 18'; Agbonlahor (red card) 65'; Guzan (yellow card) 75'	Report	Falcao 53'; Blackett (yellow card) 75'	Stadium: Villa Park; Attendance: 41,273; Referee: Lee Mason
Note: Agbonlahor's red card was rescinded by the FA on 23 December 2014.

26 December 2014 18	Swansea City	1–0	Aston Villa	Swansea
15:00 GMT	Sigurðsson 13'; Shelvey (yellow card) 24'	Report	Sánchez (yellow card) 36'; Clark (yellow card) 49'; Okore (yellow card) 76'; Agbonlahor (yellow card) 89'	Stadium: Liberty Stadium; Attendance: 20,683; Referee: Roger East

28 December 2014 19	Aston Villa	0–0	Sunderland	Birmingham
15:00 GMT	Vlaar (yellow card) 44'; Delph (red card) 49'	Report	Cattermole (yellow card) 56'; Johnson (yellow card) 73'; Giaccherini (yellow card) 90+2'	Stadium: Villa Park; Attendance: 35,436; Referee: Martin Atkinson

1 January 2015 20	Aston Villa	0–0	Crystal Palace	Birmingham
15:00 GMT	Clark (yellow card) 78'	Report	Delaney (yellow card) 86'	Stadium: Villa Park; Attendance: 29,047; Referee: Robert Madley

10 January 2015 21	Leicester City	1–0	Aston Villa	Leicester
15:00 GMT	Konchesky 45+1'; Hammond (yellow card) 56'; James (red card) 90+3'	Report	Okore (yellow card) 35'; Clark (yellow card) 63' (yellow-red card) 90+4'	Stadium: King Power Stadium; Attendance: 31,728; Referee: Michaek Oliver

17 January 2015 22	Aston Villa	0–2	Liverpool	Birmingham
15:00 GMT	Okore (yellow card) 52'	Report	Borini 24'; Lambert 79', (yellow card) 81'	Stadium: Villa Park; Attendance: 39,759; Referee: Mark Clattenburg

1 February 2015 23	Arsenal	5–0	Aston Villa	Holloway
14:00	Giroud 5'; Özil 56'; Walcott 63'; Cazorla 75' (pen.); Bellerín 90+2'	Report	Clark (yellow card) 57'; Gil (yellow card) 68'	Stadium: Emirates Stadium; Attendance: 59,958; Referee: Anthony Taylor

7 February 2015 24	Aston Villa	1–2	Chelsea	Birmingham
15:00	Cleverley (yellow card) 5'; Westwood (yellow card) 44'; Okore 48' (yellow card) 49'	Report	Hazard 8'; Ramires (yellow card) 35'; Ivanović 66', (yellow card) 90+5'	Stadium: Villa Park; Attendance: 35,969; Referee: Neil Swarbrick

10 February 2015 25	Hull City	2–0	Aston Villa	Kingston upon Hull
	Jelavić 22'; N'Doye 74'; Dawson (yellow card) 85'	Report	Hutton (yellow card) 41'; Agbonlahor (yellow card) 56'	Stadium: KC Stadium; Attendance: 21,467; Referee: Michael Oliver

21 February 2015 26	Aston Villa	1–2	Stoke City	Birmingham
15:00	Sinclair 20'; Sánchez (yellow card) 59'; Vlaar (yellow card) 90' (yellow-red card) 90+2'	Report	Wollscheid (yellow card) 35'; Diouf 45'; Whelan (yellow card) 64'; Moses 90+3' (pen.); Walters (yellow card) 90+6'	Stadium: Villa Park; Attendance: 31,880; Referee: Roger East

28 February 2015 27	Newcastle United	1–0	Aston Villa	Newcastle upon Tyne
15:00 GMT	Cissé 37'; Williamson (yellow card) 53'	Report	Hutton (yellow card) 26'; Lowton (yellow card) 47'; Agbonlahor (yellow card) 63'; Clark (yellow card) 83'; Cleverley (yellow card) 90+6'	Stadium: St James' Park; Attendance: 51,373; Referee: Lee Mason

3 March 2015 28	Aston Villa	2–1	West Bromwich Albion	Birmingham
19:45 GMT	Agbonlahor 22'; Clark (yellow card) 81'; Hutton (yellow card) 88'; Benteke 90+4' (pen.)	Report	Yacob (yellow card) 42'; Lescott (yellow card) 52'; Berahino 66' (yellow card) 88'; Gardner (yellow card) 86'	Stadium: Villa Park; Attendance: 31,272; Referee: Jonathan Moss

14 March 2015 29	Sunderland	0–4	Aston Villa	Sunderland
15:00 GMT	Bridcutt (yellow card) 90+1'	Report	Bacuna (yellow card) 8'; Benteke 16', 44'; Agbonlahor 18', 37'	Stadium: Stadium of Light; Attendance: 45,746; Referee: Neil Swarbrick

21 March 2015 30	Aston Villa	0–1	Swansea City	Birmingham
15:00 GMT		Report	Gomis 87'	Stadium: Villa Park; Referee: Robert Madley

4 April 2015 31	Manchester United	3–1	Aston Villa	Manchester
15:00 BST	Herrera 43', 90+2'; Rooney 79'	Report	Benteke 80'; Delph (yellow card) 83'	Stadium: Old Trafford; Attendance: 75,397; Referee: Roger East

7 April 2015 32	Aston Villa	3–3	Queens Park Rangers	Birmingham
15:00 BST	Benteke 10', 33', 83'	Report	Phillips 7'; Sandro (yellow card) 34'; Kranjčar (yellow card) 35'; Hill 55', (yellow card) 82'; Austin (yellow card) 56', (goal) 78'	Stadium: Villa Park; Attendance: 33,708; Referee: Craig Pawson

11 April 2015 33	Tottenham Hotspur	0–1	Aston Villa	Tottenham
15:00 BST	Bentaleb (yellow card) 65'; Rose (yellow card) 81'; Lamela (yellow card) 90+6'	Report	Benteke 35', (yellow card) 81'; Sánchez (yellow card) 58' (yellow-red card) 90+4'; Richardson (yellow card) 90+7'	Stadium: White Hart Lane; Attendance: 35,687; Referee: Lee Probert

25 April 2015 34	Manchester City	3–2	Aston Villa	Manchester
17:30 BST	Agüero 3'; Silva (yellow card) 46'; Kolarov 66'; Fernandinho 89'	Report	Westwood (yellow card) 62'; Sánchez (yellow card) 65', (goal) 85'; Cleverley 68'	Stadium: City of Manchester Stadium; Attendance: 45,036; Referee: Mike Dean

2 May 2015 35	Aston Villa	3–2	Everton	Birmingham
15:00 BST	Benteke 10', 45'; Cleverley 64'; Vlaar (yellow card) 84'; Given (yellow card) 90+3'	Report	Lukaku 59' (pen.); Coleman (yellow card) 73'; Jagielka 90+2'	Stadium: Villa Park; Attendance: 37,859; Referee: Mark Clattenburg

9 May 2015 36	Aston Villa	1–0	West Ham United	Birmingham
15:00 BST	Cleverley 31'; N'Zogbia (yellow card) 45+1'	Report	Song (yellow card) 72'	Stadium: Villa Park; Attendance: 39,294; Referee: Lee Mason

16 May 2015 37	Southampton	6–1	Aston Villa	Southampton
12:45 BST	Mané 13', 14', 16'; Long 26', 38'; Wanyama (yellow card) 69'; Pellè 81'	Report	Westwood (yellow card) 21'; Benteke 45+3'	Stadium: St Mary's Stadium; Attendance: 31,636; Referee: Robert Madley
Note: During Southampton's final home match of the season, Sadio Mané scored three times in 2 minutes 56 seconds to set a new Premier League record for the fastest hat-trick.

24 May 2015 38	Aston Villa	0–1	Burnley	Birmingham
15:00 BST	Vlaar (yellow card) 53'	Report	Ings 6'; Ulvestad (yellow card) 29'; Arfield (yellow card) 66'	Stadium: Villa Park; Attendance: 40,792; Referee: Mike Jones

=== FA Cup ===
Round	3	4	5	6	SF	F
Ground	H	H	H	H	N	N
Result	1–0	2–1	2–1	2–0	2–1	0–4

4 January 2015 3rd round	Aston Villa	1–0	Blackpool	Villa Park, Birmingham
15:00 GMT	Hutton (yellow card) 22'; Clark (yellow card) 60'; N'Zogbia (yellow card) 77'; Benteke 88'	Report		Attendance: 21,837; Referee: Chris Foy

25 January 2015 4th round	Aston Villa	2–1	Bournemouth	Villa Park, Birmingham
15:00 GMT	Gil 51'; Hutton (yellow card) 62'; Okore (yellow card) 62'; Weimann 71'; Bacuna (yellow card) 83'	Report	Wilson 90+3'	Attendance: 27,415; Referee: Mike Dean

15 February 2015 5th round	Aston Villa	2–1	Leicester City	Villa Park, Birmingham
12:30 GMT	Bacuna 68'; Sinclair 89'	Report	Konchesky (yellow card) 60'; Kramarić 90+1'; Simpson (yellow card) 90+2'	Attendance: 28,098; Referee: Mark Clattenburg

7 March 2015 6th round	Aston Villa	2–0	West Bromwich Albion	Villa Park, Birmingham
17:30 GMT	N'Zogbia (yellow card) 14'; Delph 51'; Agbonlahor (yellow card) 60'; Sinclair 85'; Grealish (yellow card) 86' (yellow-red card) 90+2'; Bacuna (yellow card) 90+6'	Report	Dawson (yellow card) 54'; Yacob (yellow card) 77' (yellow-red card) 79'	Attendance: 39,952; Referee: Anthony Taylor

19 April 2015 Semi-finals	Aston Villa	2–1	Liverpool	Wembley Stadium, London
15:00 BST	Benteke 36'; Delph 54', (yellow card) 80'	Report	Coutinho 30'	Attendance: 85,416; Referee: Michael Oliver

30 May 2015 Final	Arsenal	4–0	Aston Villa	Wembley Stadium, London
17:30 BST	Walcott 40'; Sánchez 50'; Mertesacker 62'; Giroud 90+3'	Report	Cleverley (yellow card) 14'; Hutton (yellow card) 33'; Delph (yellow card) 37'; Westwood (yellow card) 52'; Agbonlahor (yellow card) 83'	Attendance: 89,323; Referee: Jonathan Moss

=== League Cup ===
Round	2
Ground	H
Result	0–1

27 August 2014 2nd round	Aston Villa	0–1	Leyton Orient	Villa Park, Birmingham
19:45 BST		Report	Lowry (yellow card) 28'; Bartley (yellow card) 48'; Vincelot 87'	Attendance: 17,918; Referee: Carl Boyeson

== Statistics ==
=== Overall ===
Games played	**45** (38 Premier League, 6 FA Cup, 1 League Cup)
Games won	**15** (10 Premier League, 5 FA Cup)
Games drawn	**8** (8 Premier League)
Games lost	**22** (20 Premier League, 1 FA Cup, 1 League Cup)
Goals scored	**40** (31 Premier League, 9 FA Cup)
Goals conceded	**65** (58 Premier League, 1 League Cup, 7 FA Cup)
Total goal difference	**–25** (−26 Premier League, −1 League Cup, +2 FA Cup)
Clean sheets	**12** (10 Premier League, 2 FA Cup)
Yellow Cards	**82** (71 Premier League, 11 FA Cup)
Red Cards	**8** (7 Premier League, 1 FA Cup)
Most appearances	(England) **Cleverley** (36)
Most minutes played	(United States) **Guzan** (3060)
Top scorer	(Belgium) **Benteke** (15)
Worst Discipline	(Republic of Ireland) **Clark** (9 (yellow card) 1 (red card) )
Points	**38**
Best Result	**4–0** v Sunderland, Premier League (14/3/15)
Worst Result	**0–5** v Arsenal, Premier League (1/2/15); **1–6** v Southampton, Premier League (16/5/15)

=== Appearances ===
**Number**	**Nation**	**Name**	**Premier League**		**FA Cup**		**League Cup**		Total		Notes
**Number**	**Nation**	**Name**	Start	Sub	Start	Sub	Start	Sub	Start	Sub	
Goalkeepers
1	(United States)	Guzan	34	–	–	–	–	–	34	0	
13	(England)	Steer	1	–	–	–	–	–	1	0	(Note: Loaned to Doncaster Rovers on 1 August 2014. Returned 1 November 2014) (Note: Loaned to Yeovil Town on 31 October 2014. Returned 31 January 2015.)
31	(Republic of Ireland)	Given	3	–	5	–	1	–	9	0	
Defenders
2	(England)	Baker	8	3	1	–	1	–	9	3	
3	(England)	Bennett	–	–	–	–	–	–	0	0	(Note: Loaned to Brighton & Hove Albion on 20 August 2014. Returned 2 May 2015.)
4	(Netherlands)	Vlaar	19	1	1	–	–	–	21	1	
5	(Denmark)	Okore	22	1	3	1	–	–	25	2	
6	(Republic of Ireland)	Clark	22	3	4	–	–	–	27	2	
14	(Switzerland)	Senderos	7	1	–	–	1	–	8	1	
21	(Scotland)	Hutton	27	3	3	–	1	–	31	3	
23	(France)	Cissokho	24	1	2	–	–	–	26	1	
32	(Saint Lucia)	Donacien	–	–	–	–	–	–	0	0	(Note: Loaned to Tranmere Rovers on 18 August 2014. Returned 2 May 2015.)
34	(England)	Lowton	8	4	1	–	–	–	9	4	
35	(Republic of Ireland)	Stevens	–	–	–	–	–	–	0	0	(Note: Loaned to Northmapton Town on 10 October 2014. Returned 6 November.) (Note: Loaned to Doncaster Rovers on 6 November 2014. Returned 2 May 2015.)
–	(Spain)	Luna	–	–	–	–	–	–	0	0	(Note: Loaned to Verona on 4 August 2014. Returned 2 February 2015.) (Note: Loaned to Spezia on 2 February 2015.)
Midfielders
7	(Curaçao)	Bacuna	10	9	5	–	1	–	16	9	
8	(England)	Cleverley	31	–	5	–	–	–	36	0	(Note: Loaned from Manchester United on 2 September 2014.)
9	(England)	Sinclair	5	4	1	2	–	–	6	6	(Note: Loaned from Manchester City on 30 January 2015.) (Note: Signed for the club permanently on 19 May 2015.)
12	(England)	Cole	3	9	1	1	1	–	5	8	
15	(England)	Westwood	25	2	4	1	1	–	29	3	
16	(England)	Delph	27	1	2	–	–	–	30	1	
17	(Australia)	Herd	–	–	–	–	–	–	0	0	(Note: Loaned to Bolton Wanderers on 23 September 2014. Returned 8 November 2014.) (Note: Loaned to Wigan Athletic on 26 January 2015. Returned 19 February 2015 due to injury.)
18	(England)	Richardson	16	6	2	–	1	–	19	6	
22	(England)	Gardner	–	–	–	–	–	–	0	0	(Note: Loaned to Brighton & Hove Albion on 26 August 2014. Recalled on 29 December 2014.) (Note: Loaned to Nottingham Forest on 10 January 2015. Returned 2 May 2015.)
24	(Colombia)	Sánchez	20	8	2	1	1	–	23	9	
25	(Spain)	Gil	4	1	1	1	–	–	7	1	(Note: Signed for the club on 13 January 2015.)
28	(France)	N'Zogbia	19	8	2	1	–	–	21	9	
36	(Jamaica)	Johnson	–	–	–	–	–	–	0	0	(Note: Loaned to Chesterfield on 8 August 2014.) (Note: Loaned to Oldham Athletic on 10 November 2014. Returned 5 January 2015.) (Note: Permanently joined Preston North End on 23 January 2015.)
39	(England)	Calder	–	–	–	–	–	–	0	0	
40	(Republic of Ireland)	Grealish	7	10	2	3	1	–	10	13	
–	(Mali)	Sylla	–	–	–	–	–	–	0	0	(Note: Loaned to Kayseri Erciyesspor on 6 August 2014.)
–	(Bulgaria)	Tonev	–	–	–	–	–	–	0	0	(Note: Loaned to Celtic on 11 August 2014.)
Forwards
10	(Austria)	Weimann	20	11	2	1	–	1	22	13	
11	(England)	Agbonlahor	30	4	1	–	–	–	31	4	
19	(England)	Bent	–	7	–	–	1	–	1	7	(Note: Loaned to Brighton & Hove Albion on 26 November 2014. Recalled 29 December.) (Note: Loaned to Derby County on 2 January 2015. Returned 2 May 2015.)
20	(Belgium)	Benteke	26	3	4	–	–	–	30	3	
27	(Czech Republic)	Kozák	–	–	–	–	–	–	0	0	
29	(England)	Hepburn-Murphy	–	1	–	–	–	–	0	1	
37	(England)	Robinson	–	–	–	–	–	–	0	0	(Note: Loaned to Preston North End on 16 September 2014. Recalled 26 November.) (Note: Loaned to Preston North End on 2 February 2015. Returned 11 May 2015.)
–	(Denmark)	Helenius	–	–	–	–	–	–	0	0	(Note: Loaned to Aalborg BK on 9 July 2014.)

Last updated: 25 May 2015.
Source: World Football

=== Goalscorers ===
Correct as of 24 May 2015
Players with the same number of goals are listed by their position on the club's official website Source
Players highlighted in light grey denote the player had scored for the club before leaving for another club
Players highlighted in light cyan denote the player has scored for the club after arriving at Aston Villa during the season
Players highlighted in Blonde denote the player has scored for the club before leaving the club on loan for part/the rest of the season

Pos.	Playing Pos.	Nation	Name	Premier League	FA Cup	League Cup	Total
1	FW	(Belgium)	Christian Benteke	13	2	–	15
2	FW	(England)	Gabriel Agbonlahor	6	–	–	6
3	FW	(Austria)	Andreas Weimann	3	1	0	4
4	MF	(England)	Tom Cleverley	3	–	0	3
4	MF	(England)	Scott Sinclair	1	2	–	3
6	MF	(England)	Fabian Delph	–	2	–	2
6	DF	(Denmark)	Jores Okore	1	–	0	1
6	DF	(Republic of Ireland)	Ciaran Clark	1	–	0	1
6	DF	(Scotland)	Alan Hutton	1	–	0	1
6	MF	(Curaçao)	Leandro Bacuna	–	1	0	1
6	MF	(England)	Joe Cole	1	–	0	1
6	MF	(Colombia)	Carlos Sánchez	1	–	0	1
6	MF	(Spain)	Carles Gil	–	1	–	1
**Total**				**31**	**9**	**0**	40

=== Disciplinary record ===
Correct as of 24 May 2015
Players are listed in descending order of (yellow card)
Players with the same number of cards are listed by their position on the club's official website Source
Players highlighted in light grey denote the player has received a yellow/red card for the club before leaving for another club
Players highlighted in light cyan denote the player has received a yellow/red card for the club after arriving at Aston Villa during the season
Players highlighted in Blonde denote the player has received a yellow/red card for the club before leaving the club on loan for part/the rest of the season

**No.**	**Nat**	**Pos**	**Name**	**Premier League**			**FA Cup**			**League Cup**			**Total**		
**No.**	**Nat**	**Pos**	**Name**	Yellow card	(yellow card) (yellow-red card)	Red card	Yellow card	(yellow card) (yellow-red card)	Red card	Yellow card	(yellow card) (yellow-red card)	Red card	Yellow card	(yellow card) (yellow-red card)	Red card
6	(Republic of Ireland)	DF	Ciaran Clark	8	1	–	1	–	–	–	–	–	**9**	1	**0**
21	(Scotland)	DF	Alan Hutton	8	–	–	2	–	–	0	0	0	**10**	0	**0**
11	(England)	FW	Gabriel Agbonlahor	8	–	1	–	–	–	–	–	–	**8**	0	**1**^{1}
24	(Colombia)	MF	Carlos Sánchez	6	1	–	–	–	–	0	0	0	**6**	1	**0**
4	(Netherlands)	DF	Ron Vlaar	4	1	–	–	–	–	–	–	–	**4**	1	**0**
5	(Denmark)	DF	Jores Okore	5	–	–	1	–	–	–	–	–	**6**	0	**0**
8	(England)	MF	Tom Cleverley	6	–	–	–	–	–	–	–	–	**6**^{2}	0	**0**
28	(France)	MF	Charles N'Zogbia	3	–	–	2	–	–	–	–	–	**5**	0	**0**
10	(Austria)	FW	Andreas Weimann	5	–	–	–	–	–	0	0	0	**5**	0	**0**
15	(England)	MF	Ashley Westwood	4	–	–	–	–	–	0	0	0	**4**	0	**0**
7	(Curaçao)	MF	Leandro Bacuna	1	–	–	2	–	–	0	0	0	**3**	0	**0**
16	(England)	MF	Fabian Delph	1	–	1	1	–	–	–	–	–	**2**	0	**1**
18	(England)	MF	Kieran Richardson	2	–	1	–	–	–	0	0	0	**2**	0	**1**
1	(United States)	GK	Brad Guzan	2	–	–	–	–	–	–	–	–	**2**	0	**0**
14	(Switzerland)	DF	Philippe Senderos	2	–	–	–	–	–	0	0	0	**2**	0	**0**
34	(England)	DF	Matthew Lowton	2	–	–	–	–	–	–	–	–	**2**	0	**0**
40	(Republic of Ireland)	MF	Jack Grealish	–	–	–	1	1	–	0	0	0	**1**	1	**0**
31	(Republic of Ireland)	GK	Shay Given	1	–	–	–	–	–	–	–	–	**1**	0	**0**
20	(Belgium)	FW	Christian Benteke	1	–	1	–	–	–	–	–	–	**1**	0	**1**
23	(France)	DF	Aly Cissokho	1	–	–	–	–	–	–	–	–	**1**	0	**0**
25	(Spain)	MF	Carles Gil	1	–	–	–	–	–	–	–	–	**1**	0	**0**
			**TOTALS**	**70**	**2**	**4**	**11**	**1**	–	**0**	**0**	**0**	**81**	2	**4**

Notes

^{1}Red card rescinded by the FA on 23/12/14.
^{2}Cleverley received one yellow card whilst playing for Manchester United (not included in this total).

==== Suspensions ====
Player	Date Received	Offence	Length of suspension	
(Belgium) Christian Benteke	(red card) v Tottenham Hotspur, 2/11/14	Violent conduct	3 Matches	West Ham (H), Southampton (H), Burnley (A), Premier League
(Austria) Andreas Weimann	(yellow card) v Crystal Palace, 2/12/14	5 cautions	1 Match	Leicester City (H), Premier League
(Scotland) Alan Hutton	(yellow card) v West Bromwich Albion, 13/12/14	5 cautions	1 Match	Manchester United (H), Premier League
(England) Tom Cleverley	(yellow card) v West Bromwich Albion, 13/12/14	5 cautions	1 Match	Manchester United (H), Premier League
(England) Kieran Richardson	(red card) v West Bromwich Albion, 13/12/14	Serious foul play	3 Matches	Manchester United (H), Swansea City (A), Sunderland (H), Premier League
(England) Gabriel Agbonlahor	(yellow card) v Swansea City, 26/12/14	5 cautions	1 Match	Sunderland (H), Premier League
(England) Fabian Delph	(red card) v Sunderland, 28/12/14	Serious foul play	3 Matches	Crystal Palace (H), Leicester City (A), Premier League; Blackpool (H), FA Cup
(Republic of Ireland) Ciaran Clark	(red card) v Leicester City, 10/1/15	2nd bookable offence	1 Match	Liverpool (H), Premier League
(Netherlands) Ron Vlaar	(red card) v Stoke City, 21/2/15	2nd bookable offence	1 Match	Newcastle United (A), Premier League
(Scotland) Alan Hutton	(yellow card) v West Bromwich Albion, 3/3/15	10 cautions	2 Matches	Sunderland (H), Premier League; West Bromwich Albion (H), FA Cup
(Republic of Ireland) Jack Grealish	(red card) v West Bromwich Albion, 8/3/15	2nd bookable offence	1 Match	Sunderland (H), Premier League
(Colombia) Carlos Sánchez	(red card) v Tottenham Hotspur, 11/4/15	2nd bookable offence	1 Match	Liverpool (N), FA Cup

=== Injuries ===
Players in bold are still out from their injuries.
Players listed will/have miss(ed) at least one competitive game (missing from whole matchday squad).

Date reported	Pos.	Name	Injury	Notes	Recovery time	Return date*	Source
2/1/14	FW	Libor Kozák	Broken leg	Occurred during training incident (2013/14)	15 months	8/4/15	
3/4/14	FW	Christian Benteke	Ruptured Achilles tendon	Occurred during training (2013/14).	6 months	4/10/14	
17/7/14	MF	Joe Cole	Thigh injury	Occurred in pre-season match against Mansfield Town.	5 weeks	23/8/14	
16/8/14	DF	Jores Okore	Illness / knee injury		1 month	13/9/14	
23/8/14	DF	Aly Cissokho	Ankle injury	Occurred in match against Newcastle United.	1 week	31/8/14	
31/8/14	DF	Ron Vlaar	Calf strain	Occurred in match against Hull City.	6 weeks	18/10/14	
20/9/14	DF	Nathan Baker	Sickness bug		1 week	27/9/14	
20/9/14	MF	Ashley Westwood	Sickness bug		1 week	27/9/14	
20/9/14	FW	Darren Bent	Sickness bug		1 week	27/9/14	
27/9/14	FW	Gabriel Agbonlahor	Illness	Fell ill during warm up before Manchester City match.	1 week	18/10/14	
9/10/14	FW	Philippe Senderos	Thigh injury	Occurred whilst on international duty.	1 month	8/11/14	
14/10/14	MF	Fabian Delph	Dislocated shoulder	Occurred during training.	2 months	13/12/14	
18/10/14	DF	Nathan Baker	Hamstring injury	Occurred during match against Everton.	2 weeks	2/11/14	
25/10/14	DF	Alan Hutton	Ankle injury	Occurred during training.	3 weeks	24/11/14	
8/11/14	FW	Nathan Baker	Knee injury	Occurred during match against West Ham United.	2 months	17/1/15	
8/11/14	DF	Ron Vlaar	Calf injury	Occurred after match against West Ham United.	5 weeks	13/12/14	
20/11/14	FW	Philippe Senderos	Calf injury	Occurred whilst on international duty.	5 months	20/4/15	
2/12/14	MF	Joe Cole	Hamstring injury	Occurred in match against Crystal Palace.	1 month	4/1/15	
8/12/14	MF	Ashley Westwood	Medial ligament injury	Occurred in match against Leicester City.	3.5 weeks	4/1/15	
1/1/15	DF	Ron Vlaar	Knee injury	Occurred during match against Crystal Palace.	6 weeks	7/2/15	
17/1/15	MF	Fabian Delph	Achilles injury	Occurred after match against Liverpool.	1 week	1/2/15	
19/1/15	MF	Joe Cole	Hamstring injury	Occurred during training.	2 weeks	7/2/15	
19/1/15	FW	Gabriel Agbonlahor	Hamstring injury	Occurred during training.	1 week	1/2/15	
5/2/15	DF	Nathan Baker	Knee injury	Ongoing injury.	2 months	4/4/15	
14/2/15	MF	Carles Gil	Thigh injury	Occurred during training.	1 week	21/2/15	
14/2/15	FW	Gabriel Agbonlahor	Hamstring injury	Occurred during training.	1 week	21/2/15	
17/2/15	MF	Chris Herd	Medial ligament injury	Occurred while on loan at Wigan Athletic.	N/A	Postseason	
21/2/15	DF	Kieran Richardson	Calf/shin injury	Occurred during match against Stoke City.	6 weeks	7/4/15	
24/2/15	DF	Aly Cissokho	Groin/pelvis injury	Occurred during training.	2 months	20/4/15	
26/2/15	DF	Ron Vlaar	Calf muscle strain	Ongoing injury.	5 weeks	4/4/15	
3/3/15	FW	Christian Benteke	Hip injury	Occurred during game against West Bromwich Albion.	11 days	14/3/15	
1/4/15	MF	Scott Sinclair	Hamstring injury	Occurred during training.	2 weeks	19/4/15	
2/4/15	MF	Ashley Westwood	Hamstring injury	Occurred during training.	2 weeks	19/4/15	
4/4/15	DF	Alan Hutton	Ankle/foot injury	Occurred during match against Manchester United.	1 month	2/5/15	
8/4/15	MF	Carles Gil	Hip/thigh injury	Occurred during under-21 match against Wolverhampton Wanderers.	11 days	19/4/15	
11/4/15	DF	Ciaran Clark	Knee injury	Occurred during match against Tottenham Hotspur.	N/A	Postseason	
11/4/15	FW	Gabriel Agbonlahor	Hamstring injury	Occurred during match against Tottenham Hotspur.	1 month	9/5/15	
19/4/15	DF	Nathan Baker	Knee injury	Occurred during match against Liverpool.	1 month	24/5/15	
11/5/15	FW	Libor Kozák	Back injury	Occurred during training.	N/A	Postseason	
16/5/15	DF	Jores Okore	Knee injury	Injury aggravated due to player's involvement in matches.	N/A	Postseason	
18/5/15	DF	Kieran Richardson	Calf injury	Occurred during training.	10 days	30/5/15	
23/5/15	GK	Shay Given	Groin injury	Occurred during training.	5 days	30/5/15	

• 'Return date' is date that player returned to any AV match day squad.

As of

== Awards ==
=== Club awards ===
At the end of the season, Aston Villa's annual award ceremony, including categories voted for by the players and backroom staff, the supporters and the supporters club, saw the following players recognised for their achievements for the club throughout the 2014–15 season.

Supporters' Player of the Year (Terrace Trophy)	(England) Fabian Delph
Supporters' Young Player of the Year	(Republic of Ireland) Jack Grealish
Goal of the Season	(Spain) Carles Gil vs. Bournemouth, FA Cup

=== Divisional awards ===
Date	Nation	Winner	Award
April 2015	(Belgium)	Christian Benteke	Premier League Player of the Month
