= Carlos Sánchez (footballer, born 1986) =

Colombian footballer (born 1986)

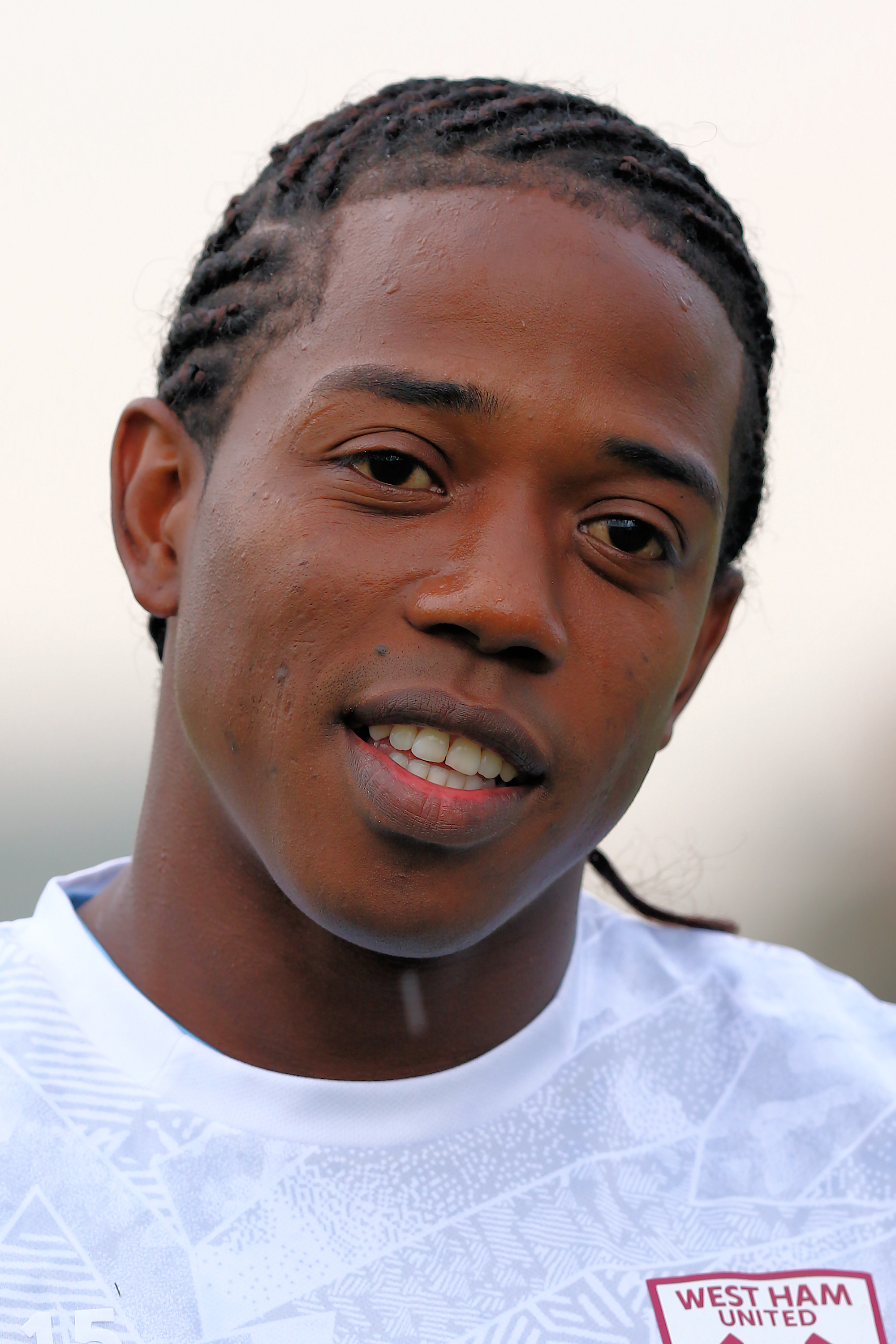
- Sánchez with West Ham United in 2019

Personal information
- Full name: Carlos Alberto Sánchez Moreno
- Date of birth: 6 February 1986 (age 40)
- Place of birth: Quibdó, Colombia
- Height: 1.82 m (6 ft 0 in)
- Positions: Defensive midfielder; centre-back

Youth career
- 2003–2005: Danubio

Senior career*
Years	Team	Apps	(Gls)
2005–2007	River Plate Montevideo	40	(1)
2007–2013	Valenciennes	178	(10)
2013–2014	Elche	30	(0)
2014–2017	Aston Villa	48	(1)
2016–2017	→ Fiorentina (loan)	31	(1)
2017–2018	Fiorentina	9	(1)
2018	→ Espanyol (loan)	14	(0)
2018–2020	West Ham United	13	(0)
2021	Watford	9	(0)
2021–2023	Santa Fe	51	(3)
2023–2024	San Lorenzo	41	(0)
2024	Barracas Central	11	(0)
Total		457	(17)

International career^{‡}
2007–2018	Colombia	88	(0)
Medal record
Representing Colombia
Copa América Centenario
Bronze medal – third place	2016
- * Club domestic league appearances and goals as of 18:00, 10 January 2025 (UTC) ‡ National team caps and goals as of 3 July 2018

Carlos Alberto Sánchez Moreno (born 6 February 1986) is a Colombian former professional footballer who played as a defensive midfielder. He is nicknamed La Roca (The Rock), due to his strength.

He began his career at River Plate Montevideo before moving to Valenciennes in 2007, where he made 178 Ligue 1 appearances and scored ten goals across six seasons. He later played in La Liga for Elche and Espanyol, the Premier League for Aston Villa and Serie A for Fiorentina.

A full international since 2007, Sánchez has earned over 80 caps for Colombia. He was part of the squads that reached the quarter-finals of the 2011 Copa América, 2014 FIFA World Cup and the 2015 Copa América, and finished third in the 2016 Copa América Centenario and 2018 FIFA World Cup.

== Club career ==
=== Colombia ===
Born in Quibdó, Chocó, Sánchez moved to a football school in Medellín and then onto Uruguayan club Danubio, where he signed his first professional contract in 2003 and was a teammate of Edinson Cavani. However, he was released two years later, making no first-team appearances.

In the summer of 2005, Sánchez joined fellow league team River Plate Montevideo. He featured in 40 matches during his two-year spell, scoring once.

=== Valenciennes ===
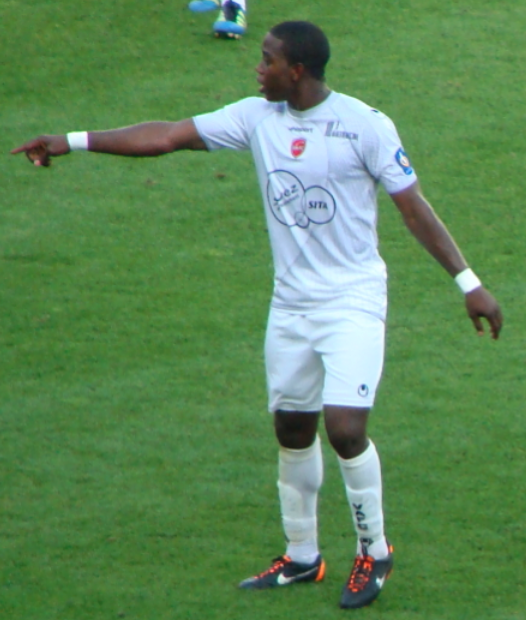
Sánchez playing for Valenciennes in 2011

In July 2007, Sánchez was bought by a group of investors and was assigned to Rangers de Talca, subsequently moving abroad for the first time in his career, by agreeing to a five-year deal with Ligue 1 side Valenciennes. He made his debut on 4 August, starting in a 3–1 home win against Toulouse.

Sánchez featured regularly for the side in his debut campaign, and was an ever-present figure during the following seasons. In March 2010, he damaged his anterior cruciate ligament, being sidelined nearly a year.

After making 148 appearances for the club, scoring 8 goals in the league, Sánchez left the club in the summer of 2012 when his contract expired. After long negotiations with Bolton Wanderers and West Ham United, he failed to reach an agreement with any club, and subsequently rejoined his former club Valenciennes on 25 August 2012.

=== Elche ===
On 16 August 2013, Sánchez signed a three-year deal with Spanish side Elche, freshly promoted to La Liga, for a €3.7 million fee. He made his debut on 24 August, starting in a 1–1 home draw against Real Sociedad.

=== Aston Villa ===
On 15 August 2014, Aston Villa announced the signing of Sánchez on a four-year contract for an undisclosed fee reported to be around £4.7 million. His first Villa appearance came eight days later when he replaced Charles N'Zogbia as a substitute in the 62nd minute of a goalless draw with Newcastle United at Villa Park. He made his first start for the club in their 3–0 home defeat against Arsenal on 20 September, after illness had ruled out some of his teammates. On 11 April 2015, he was sent off for two yellow cards as the team won 1–0 away to Tottenham Hotspur at White Hart Lane, causing him to miss their victory over Liverpool in the FA Cup semi-final eight days later. Sánchez scored his first goal for Villa on 25 April, an 85th-minute deflected volleyed equaliser away to title holders Manchester City, but Fernandinho later netted a winner for City. He made a 19-minute substitute appearance in the 2015 FA Cup Final on 30 May at Wembley Stadium in place of Ashley Westwood, in an eventual 4–0 loss to Arsenal.

=== Fiorentina ===
On 10 August 2016, after Villa's relegation, Sánchez was loaned to Serie A club Fiorentina for a season. He made his debut ten days later as a 65th-minute substitute for Milan Badelj in a 2–1 loss away to reigning champions Juventus on the first day of the season. Eight days later, he made his first start in a 1–0 home win over Chievo, in which he scored the goal. The move was made permanent at the end of the campaign.

=== RCD Espanyol ===
On 31 January 2018, Sánchez returned to La Liga on loan to RCD Espanyol for the remainder of the season. He made his debut four days later in a 1–1 home draw with FC Barcelona in the Derbi barceloní, playing the final four minutes in place of Léo Baptistão.

=== West Ham United ===
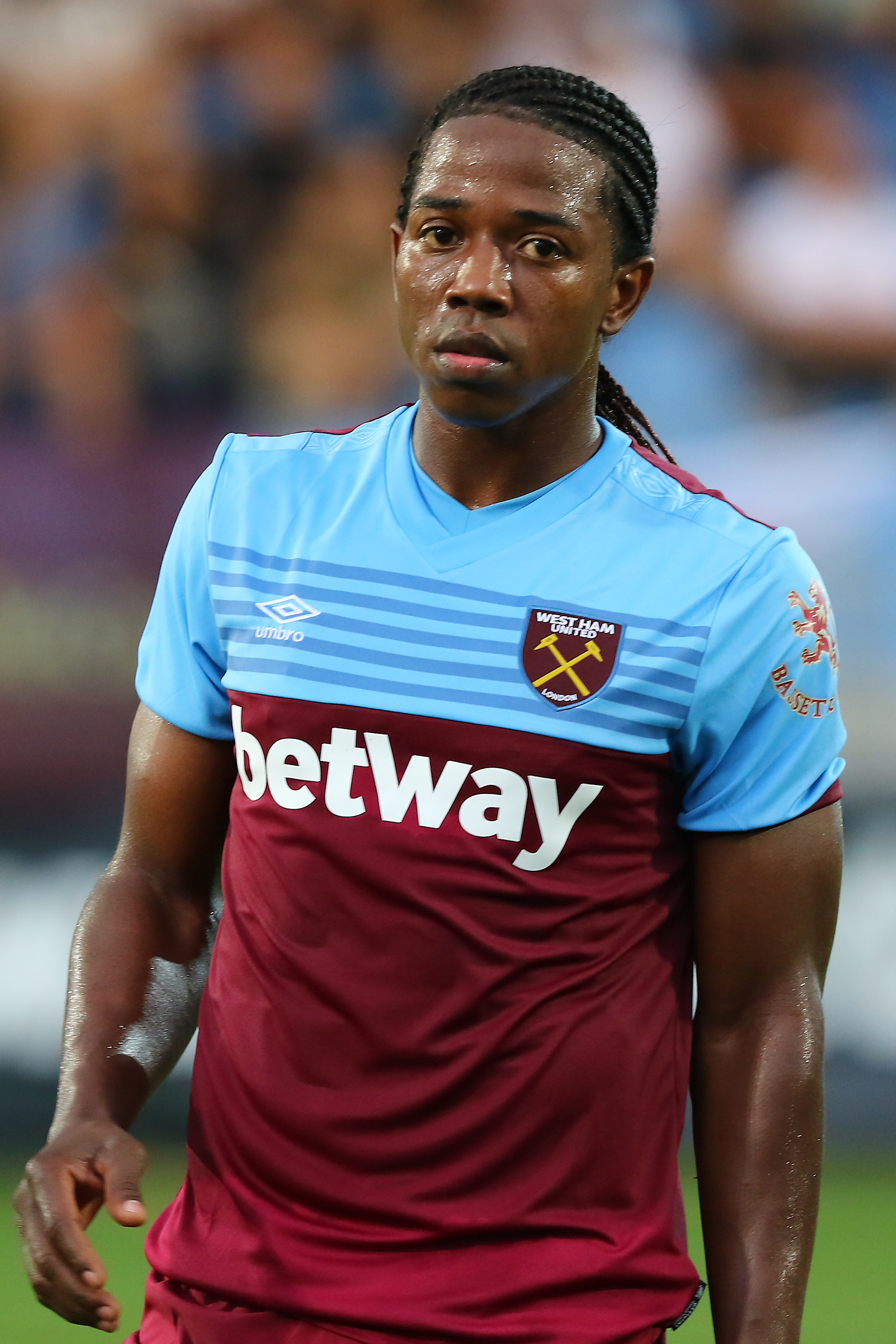
Sánchez with West Ham United in 2019

On 9 August 2018, Sánchez signed a two-year deal with Premier League club West Ham United. Having made just six appearances, in September 2018 he injured his knee in an EFL Cup game against Macclesfield Town requiring knee surgery. He returned to the first team in May 2019, playing in their 3–0 home win against Southampton. In June 2020, West Ham confirmed his departure from the club at the end of the month.

=== Watford ===
On 4 March 2021, Sanchez joined English side Watford on a short-term deal until the end of the 2020–21 season. He left Watford at the end of the season following the expiration of his contract.

== International career ==
Sánchez made his international debut against Panama on 9 May 2007. He was then included in the 34-man provisional squad for the Copa América 2007, but later dropped for the final list. He was in the first team for all of Colombia's matches for 2010 FIFA World Cup qualification including the 2–1 victory over Argentina on 20 November 2007 in Bogotá. At the 2011 Copa América, he started three of Colombia's four matches as they reached the quarter-finals, coming into the team at the expense of Gustavo Bolívar after the opening game. He played in all five of Colombia's matches in the FIFA World Cup finals in Brazil in 2014, playing a defensive role which allowed James Rodríguez and Juan Cuadrado to be attacking midfielders.

Sánchez was included in Colombia's squad for the 2015 Copa América, where he was credited with "dominating" Neymar during his man of the match performance in the 1–0 group stage defeat of Brazil in Santiago.

His performance at the 2018 FIFA World Cup was poor. He got a red card for stretching his hand to block Shinji Kagawa's shot in the 3rd minute against Japan, denying an obvious goal scoring opportunity and giving away a penalty, which led to a 2–1 win for the Japanese. Then in the round-of-16, when defending a corner kick, he pulled down Harry Kane in the 57th minute to give away a penalty, which Kane converted.

Only José Batista of Uruguay in 1986 was sent off earlier in a World Cup game. Sánchez received death threats for his red card, which were likened by BBC Sport to the assassination of Colombia player Andrés Escobar for his own goal at the 1994 FIFA World Cup. Manager José Pékerman dedicated the team's 3–0 win over Poland to the suspended Sánchez.

== Personal life ==
Sánchez is married to Noelia Polvoria, whom he met in Montevideo.

== Career statistics ==
=== Club ===
As of match played on 10 April 2024

Appearances and goals by club, season and competition
Club	Season	League			National Cup		League Cup		Continental		Total	
Club	Season	Division	Apps	Goals	Apps	Goals	Apps	Goals	Apps	Goals	Apps	Goals
River Plate Montevideo	2005–06	Uruguayan Primera División	14	0	—		—		—		14	0
River Plate Montevideo	2006–07	Uruguayan Primera División	26	1	—		—		—		26	1
River Plate Montevideo	Total		40	1	—		—		—		40	1
Valenciennes	2007–08	Ligue 1	34	0	0	0	0	0	—		34	0
Valenciennes	2008–09	Ligue 1	37	1	0	0	0	0	—		37	0
Valenciennes	2009–10	Ligue 1	28	5	0	0	1	0	—		29	0
Valenciennes	2010–11	Ligue 1	28	2	2	0	1	0	—		31	2
Valenciennes	2011–12	Ligue 1	21	2	2	0	0	0	—		23	2
Valenciennes	2012–13	Ligue 1	30	0	0	0	1	0	—		31	0
Valenciennes	Total		178	10	4	0	3	0	—		185	10
Elche	2013–14	La Liga	30	0	1	0	—		—		31	0
Aston Villa	2014–15	Premier League	28	1	4	0	1	0	—		34	1
Aston Villa	2015–16	Premier League	20	0	3	0	—		—		23	0
Aston Villa	Total		48	1	7	0	1	0	—		56	1
Fiorentina	2016–17	Serie A	31	1	2	0	—		8	0	41	1
Fiorentina	2017–18	Serie A	9	1	2	0	—		—		11	1
Fiorentina	Total		40	2	4	0	—		8	0	52	2
Espanyol (loan)	2017–18	La Liga	14	0	0	0	—		—		14	0
West Ham United	2018–19	Premier League	7	0	0	0	1	0	—		8	0
West Ham United	2019–20	Premier League	6	0	2	0	2	0	—		10	0
West Ham United	Total		13	0	2	0	3	0	0	0	18	0
Watford	2020–21	Championship	9	0	0	0	0	0	—		9	0
Santa Fe	2021	Categoría Primera A	9	1	0	0	2	0	—		11	1
Santa Fe	2022	Categoría Primera A	42	2	1	0	0	0	—		43	2
Santa Fe	Total		51	3	1	0	2	0	0	0	54	3
San Lorenzo	2023	Argentine Primera División	23	0	3	0	13	0	4	0	43	0
San Lorenzo	2024	Argentine Primera División	0	0	0	0	4	0	1	0	5	0
Career total			446	17	22	0	23	0	13	0	507	17

=== International ===
As of match played 3 July 2018

Appearances and goals by national team and year
National team	Year	Apps	Goals
Colombia
Colombia	2007	5	0
Colombia	2008	6	0
Colombia	2011	7	0
Colombia	2012	8	0
Colombia	2013	10	0
Colombia	2014	10	0
Colombia	2015	10	0
Colombia	2016	12	0
Colombia	2017	10	0
Colombia	2018	10	0
Total		88	0

== Honours ==
Aston Villa

- FA Cup runner-up: 2014–15

Independiente Santa Fe

- Superliga Colombiana: 2021

Colombia

- Copa América third place: 2016
