= 2015 FA Cup final =

English association football match

- The match was played at Wembley Stadium.
- Event: 2014–15 FA Cup
Arsenal	Aston Villa
4	0
- Date: 30 May 2015
- Venue: Wembley Stadium, London
- Man of the Match: Santi Cazorla (Arsenal)
- Referee: Jon Moss (West Yorkshire)
- Attendance: 89,283
- Weather: Scattered clouds 16 °C (61 °F)

The 2015 FA Cup final was an association football match played between Arsenal and Aston Villa at Wembley Stadium, London, on 30 May 2015. Organised by the Football Association (FA), it was the 134th final of the Football Association Challenge Cup (FA Cup), the world's oldest football cup competition. En route to the final, Arsenal defeated Hull City, Brighton & Hove Albion, Middlesbrough, Manchester United and Reading (after extra time). Aston Villa secured victories over Blackpool, Bournemouth, Leicester City, West Bromwich Albion and Liverpool in the rounds before the final.

Theo Walcott gave Arsenal the lead in the 40th minute. Nacho Monreal crossed from the left side of the pitch to Alexis Sánchez whose header found Walcott who struck the ball on the volley into the goal. Ten minutes later, Alexis Sánchez struck the ball from around 30 yards (27 m) into the roof of the Aston Villa net to double his side's lead before Per Mertesacker made it 3–0 with a header midway through the second half. Three minutes into stoppage time, Olivier Giroud scored from close range to give Arsenal a 4–0 victory. It was the sixth FA Cup win for manager Arsène Wenger, putting him in joint first place for wins with George Ramsay.

Arsenal had already qualified for the Champions League by finishing third in the Premier League, and following a change in UEFA rules, the remaining Europa League place went to Southampton, the highest-placed Premier League team that had not qualified for any European competition instead of Aston Villa. As FA Cup winners, Arsenal played Chelsea, winners of the Premier League, in the 2015 FA Community Shield at Wembley.

== Background ==
The FA Cup is an annual knockout tournament involving professional and amateur men's football clubs in the English football league system. It is the world's oldest football cup competition. The 2015 final was the 134th final to be played since it was first held in 1872.

Arsenal were playing a record nineteenth FA Cup final, surpassing Manchester United. Of these, they had won eleven, a joint record with Manchester United, most recently the previous season's final against Hull City. Their most recent defeat in the final was in 2001, losing 2–1 to Liverpool. It was Aston Villa's eleventh final, of which they had won seven, most recently in 1957 with a 2–1 win over Manchester United. Their most recent final was a 1–0 defeat to Chelsea in 2000.

Arsenal and Aston Villa played twice during the league season, both games resulting in Arsenal victories. On 20 September 2014, they won 3–0 at Villa Park with three goals in less than four minutes of the first half, from Mesut Özil, Danny Welbeck and an own goal from Aly Cissokho off a shot from Kieran Gibbs. At their home ground, the Emirates Stadium, on 1 February 2015, Arsenal triumphed 5–0 with goals by Olivier Giroud, Özil, Theo Walcott, a penalty kick by Santi Cazorla after goalkeeper Brad Guzan had committed a foul on Chuba Akpom, and Héctor Bellerín.

== Route to the final ==
=== Arsenal ===
Arsenal's route to the final
Round	Opposition	Score
3rd	Hull City (H)	2–0
4th	Brighton & Hove Albion (A)	3–2
5th	Middlesbrough (H)	2–0
6th	Manchester United (A)	2–1
SF	Reading (N)	2–1 (a.e.t.)
Key: (H) = Home venue; (A) = Away venue; (N) = Neutral venue.

FA Cup holders Arsenal, as a Premier League club, entered the competition in the third round where they were drawn at home against fellow top-flight team Hull City in a repeat of the previous year's final. At the Emirates Stadium, Per Mertesacker scored in the 20th minute with a header from an Alexis Sánchez corner. With eight minutes remaining, Sánchez doubled Arsenal's lead with a strike from inside the Hull penalty area and his side won the match 2–0. In the fourth round, Arsenal's opposition were Championship team Brighton & Hove Albion away at the Falmer Stadium. Arsenal's Walcott opened the scoring after less than two minutes from a Calum Chambers cross before Özil made it 2–0 midway through the first half. Chris O'Grady scored for Brighton five minutes after half-time but Tomáš Rosický restored Arsenal's two-goal advantage nine minutes later with a volley after a one-two with Giroud. Sam Baldock's 75th-minute goal made it 3–2 but no further goals were scored and Arsenal progressed to the fifth round. There, they were drawn at home against Middlesbrough, another Championship club, at the Emirates Stadium. Giroud scored twice in the space of three first-half minutes and, after a goalless second half, Arsenal secured their passage to the sixth round with a 2–0 victory.

Arsenal were drawn away at Manchester United in a match televised on BBC One on a Monday evening. This led to criticism from Arsenal supporters as they suggested there would be no trains back to London after the match. Despite this, 9,000 away supporters attended the game at Old Trafford. Nacho Monreal gave the visiting side the lead in the 25th minute from close range after receiving a pass from Alex Oxlade-Chamberlain. Wayne Rooney equalised for Manchester United four minutes later, heading an Ángel Di María cross past Wojciech Szczęsny in the Arsenal goal. Former Manchester United player Welbeck then capitalised on a poor backpass by Antonio Valencia to take possession of the ball, dribbling it round David de Gea and scoring to make it 2–1. Di María was sent off with 14 minutes of the game remaining and the match ended without further scoring. In the semi-finals at Wembley Stadium, a neutral venue, Arsenal faced Championship side Reading. Sánchez scored from close range in the 39th minute before Reading's Garath McCleary equalised with a volley nine minutes into the second half. With the score level at the end of regular time, the match went into extra time when Sánchez scored in stoppage time of the first period to restore his side's lead. The second period of extra time was goalless ending the match 2–1, and Arsenal reached the FA Cup Final for the second consecutive year.

=== Aston Villa ===
Aston Villa's route to the final
Round	Opposition	Score
3rd	Blackpool (H)	1–0
4th	Bournemouth (H)	2–1
5th	Leicester City (H)	2–1
6th	West Bromwich Albion (H)	2–0
SF	Liverpool (N)	2–1
Key: (H) = Home venue; (A) = Away venue; (N) = Neutral venue.

Also a Premier League team, Aston Villa entered the tournament in the third round with a 1–0 home win over Championship club Blackpool. Christian Benteke scored the only goal two minutes from the end of the game when he controlled a pass from Carlos Sánchez before striking it past Blackpool goalkeeper Joe Lewis from around 18 yards (16 m). In the fourth round, they faced another second-tier team at home, Bournemouth. After a goalless first half, Carles Gil opened the scoring for Aston Villa on his debut six minutes after half-time with a 25-yard (23 m) curling strike past Lee Camp. Twenty minutes later, the lead was doubled by Andreas Weimann who scored from Alan Hutton's pass. Bournemouth substitute Callum Wilson scored in second-half stoppage time but Aston Villa won the match 2–1. Two weeks after the fourth round, Aston Villa's manager Paul Lambert was dismissed with his side in the relegation positions in the Premier League. He was replaced by Tim Sherwood and in the fifth round, his side were drawn at home, this time against Premier League club Leicester City. The first half ended 0–0 but Leandro Bacuna scored midway through the second half with a curling shot from outside the Leicester City penalty area. Scott Sinclair scored Aston Villa's second in the 89th minute after the ball was fumbled by Mark Schwarzer, the Leicester City goalkeeper. Andrej Kramarić scored a consolation goal one minute into stoppage time but Aston Villa progressed with a 2–1 win.

The sixth round draw saw Aston Villa drawn at home against West Midlands rivals West Bromwich Albion. After a goalless first half, Fabian Delph gave the home side the lead after receiving the ball from Charles N'Zogbia and striking it low past West Bromwich Albion goalkeeper Boaz Myhill. With ten minutes to go, West Bromwich Albion's Claudio Yacob was sent off after receiving a second yellow card and Sinclair doubled Aston Villa's lead five minutes later. Substitute Jack Grealish, who had been on the pitch less than 20 minutes, was sent off in second-half stoppage time for a second yellow card, but his side won 2–0. The victory prompted a pitch invasion for which Aston Villa were charged by The Football Association. (Note: In May 2015, Aston Villa were fined £200,000 following the sixth round pitch invasions and were severely warned as to the club's future conduct.) In the semi-final at Wembley Stadium, Aston Villa faced Liverpool. Philippe Coutinho gave Liverpool the lead in the 30th minute, shooting past Shay Given in the Aston Villa goal. Benteke scored the equaliser six minutes later, sidefooting the ball past Simon Mignolet, the Liverpool goalkeeper. Delph then gave Aston Villa the lead 11 minutes into the second half to secure his side a 2–1 victory. Aston Villa reached the final for the first time since 2000.

== Match ==
=== Pre-match ===
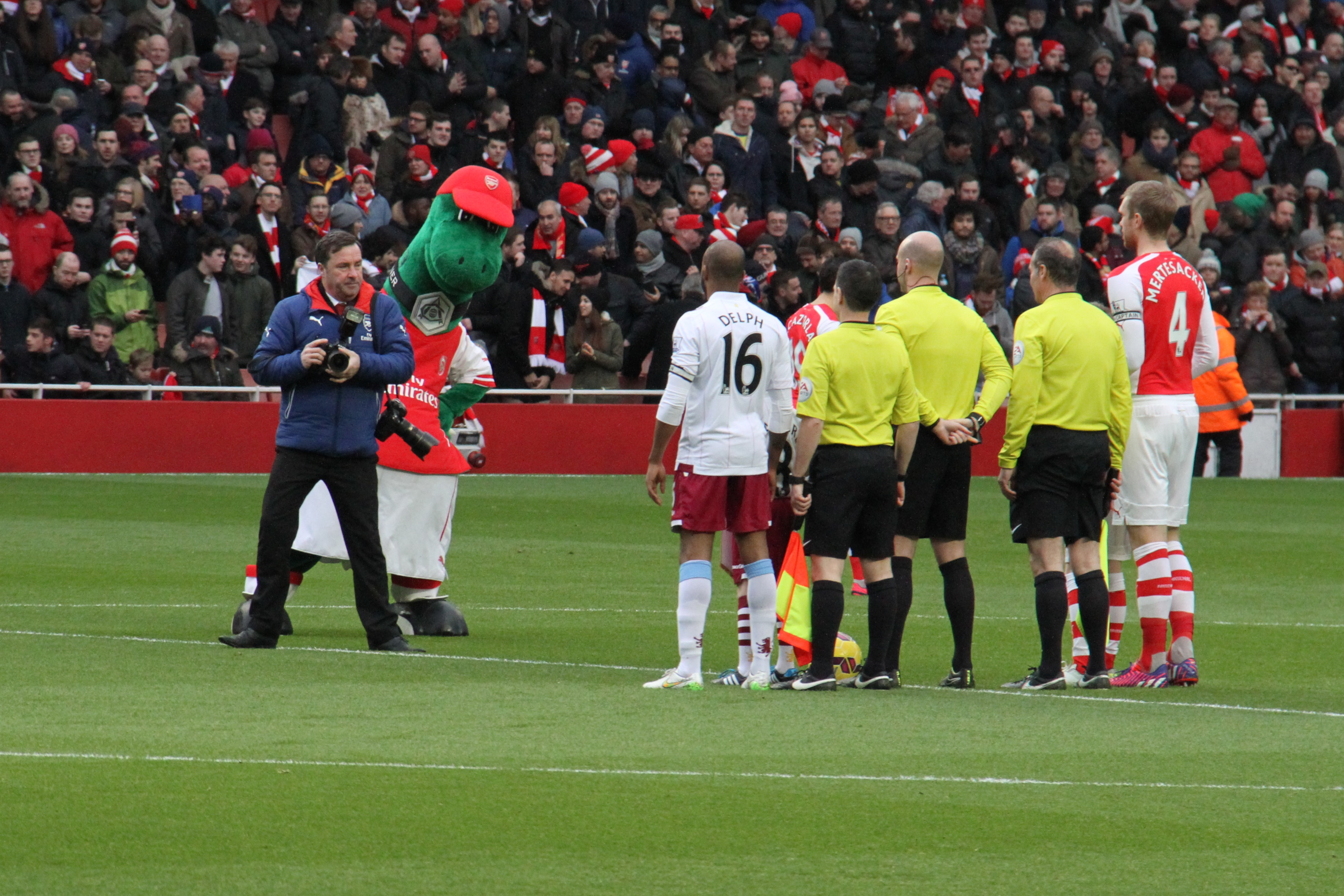
Arsenal defeated Aston Villa 5–0 in the Premier League on 1 February 2015. Pictured are Villa's Fabian Delph and Arsenal's Per Mertesacker, both club captains.

Children's television programme Blue Peter ran a competition to design the mascot for the final. The winning entry was "Billie", a horse inspired by the one which controlled the crowds ahead of the 1923 final. Former England international Phil Neville, one of the judges in the competition, said that: "I think the design is great, the story behind it is even better and I think it’s something everyone’s going to be really impressed with.” Religious television programme Songs of Praise ran a competition to be part of a 64-person choir to sing the traditional hymn "Abide with Me" before the final. The 64 were fans of each of the clubs which reached the third round of the competition, including a 99-year-old Newcastle United fan and a Liverpool fan who survived the Hillsborough disaster. The music was performed by the Band of the Brigade of Gurkhas.

Following the semi-finals, both clubs met at Wembley to discuss final arrangements. Arsenal were designated as the "home" team because they were first alphabetically. Despite this, Aston Villa won the pre-match coin toss for choice of strips and chose to wear their home claret and blue kit that they had worn for all of the previous rounds. Arsenal decided to wear their yellow and blue away strip instead of their dark blue cup kit. The BBC devoted a whole day of programming to the final, reviving the tradition of its all-day coverage. Both Aston Villa and Arsenal received a ticket allocation of 25,000 for the game with 17,000 being offered to members of Club Wembley, de facto season ticket holders at Wembley Stadium. Ticket prices ranged from £50, £70, £90 and £120.

=== Summary ===
==== First half ====
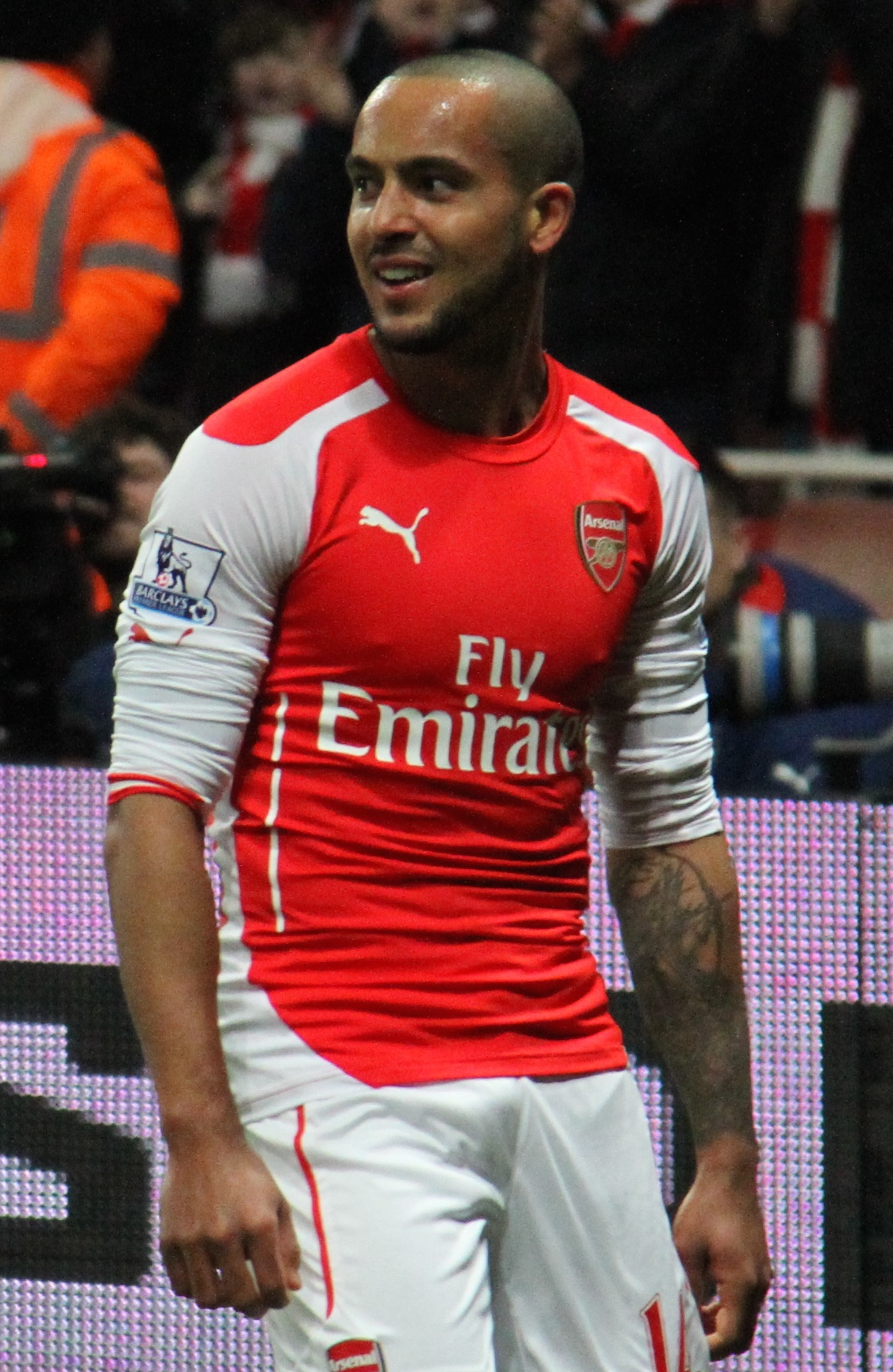
Theo Walcott scored the opening goal for Arsenal.

Aston Villa kicked off the final at around 5:30 p.m. on 30 May 2015 in front of a crowd of 89,283 spectators, under scatter cloudy conditions and a temperature of around 16 °C (61 °F). Two minutes into the match, Alexis Sánchez was fouled by Ashley Westwood, and from the resulting free kick, Özil eventually headed the ball on to Walcott but he was deemed to be in an offside position. Two minutes later, Delph's cross was caught by Arsenal goalkeeper Szczesny. In the eighth minute, Cazorla's low shot from inside the Aston Villa penalty area was defended by Hutton, and from the second of two subsequent corners, Koscielny headed wide of the goal. Benteke then fouled Cazorla but Özil's free kick was easily cleared by Ron Vlaar. Richardson's 13th-minute cross was then punched clear by Szczesny to deny Benteke a chance to open the scoring. A minute later, Tom Cleverley became the first player to be booked after he fouled Monreal. From the resulting free kick, Koscielny's header was saved by Given in the Aston Villa goal. In the 17th minute, Bellerin turned past Richardson and sent in a low cross to Aaron Ramsey whose shot hit the side netting. Özil's 20th minute pass found Ramsey inside the penalty area but his shot was high over the Aston Villa crossbar.

Midway through the first half, Özil crossed to Walcott who was 6 yards (5 m) out from the Aston Villa goal but he was denied by a sliding tackle from Richardson. In the 28th minute, Francis Coquelin passed to Ramsey who ran into the Aston Villa penalty area but his shot took a deflection off Vlaar and was easily caught by Given. Six minutes later, Hutton was shown the yellow card for a late tackle on Alexis Sánchez but Aston Villa eventually cleared the resulting free kick. In the 38th minute, Delph was booked for repeated fouls. With five minutes of the half remaining, Arsenal took the lead through Walcott. Monreal crossed from the left side of the pitch and found Alexis Sánchez; he headed back to Walcott who ran into the Aston Villa penalty area to strike the ball on the volley into the goal. After two minutes of stoppage time, the first half was brought to a close with the score at 1–0.

==== Second half ====
Neither side made changes to their personnel during the half-time interval and Arsenal kicked off the second half, with Ramsey's early shot being easily saved by Given. In the 50th minute, Alexis Sánchez struck the ball from around 30 yards (27 m) into the roof of the Aston Villa net to double his side's lead. Two minutes later, Westwood was booked for a foul on Alexis Sánchez before Aston Villa made their first substitution of the match with N'Zogbia being replaced by Agbonlahor. Alexis Sánchez then headed the ball into the Aston Villa goal but it was disallowed by the referee for offside. Cazorla's 57th minute low shot was saved by Given before Mertesacker scored with a header from a Cazorla corner, making it 3–0 to Arsenal in the 62nd minute. Midway through the second half, Delph's free kick was easily gathered by Szczesny, before Bacuna came on to replace an injured Richardson and Carlos Sánchez was brought on for Westwood.

In the 76th minute, Walcott's curling long-range shot was high and wide, before he was replaced by Giroud, and Wilshere came on for Özil. Agbonlahor was then brought down on the edge of the Arsenal area and claimed for a penalty but nothing was given by the referee. The Aston Villa player was then booked for his protests. Bellerin subsequently tackled Grealish in the Arsenal penalty area but once again, no foul was given. Grealish's subsequent 25-yard (23 m) shot was blocked before Oxlade-Chamberlain came on for Alexis Sánchez. In the third minute of second-half stoppage time, Oxlade-Chamberlain's pass found Giroud who flicked the ball into the Aston Villa goal to make it 4–0 to Arsenal, the final score. In winning their 12th FA Cup, they became the most successful team in the competition's history.

=== Details ===
30 May 2015
17:30 BST

Arsenal	4–0	Aston Villa
Walcott 40'; Sánchez 50'; Mertesacker 62'; Giroud 90+3'	Report, positions, nationalities

Wembley Stadium, London
Attendance: 89,283
Referee: Jon Moss (West Yorkshire)

Arsenal	Aston Villa

GK	1	(Poland) Wojciech Szczęsny
RB	39	(Spain) Héctor Bellerín
CB	4	(Germany) Per Mertesacker (c)
CB	6	(France) Laurent Koscielny
LB	18	(Spain) Nacho Monreal
CM	34	(France) Francis Coquelin
CM	19	(Spain) Santi Cazorla
RM	16	(Wales) Aaron Ramsey
AM	11	(Germany) Mesut Özil	(substituted off) 77'
LM	17	(Chile) Alexis Sánchez	(substituted off) 90'
CF	14	(England) Theo Walcott	(substituted off) 77'
Substitutes:
GK	13	(Colombia) David Ospina
DF	3	(England) Kieran Gibbs
DF	5	(Brazil) Gabriel Paulista
MF	10	(England) Jack Wilshere	(substituted on) 77'
MF	15	(England) Alex Oxlade-Chamberlain	(substituted on) 90'
MF	20	(France) Mathieu Flamini
FW	12	(France) Olivier Giroud	(substituted on) 77'
Manager:
(France) Arsène Wenger

GK	31	(Republic of Ireland) Shay Given
RB	21	(Scotland) Alan Hutton	(yellow card) 33'
CB	4	(Netherlands) Ron Vlaar
CB	5	(Denmark) Jores Okore
LB	18	(England) Kieran Richardson		(substituted off) 68'
DM	15	(England) Ashley Westwood	(yellow card) 52'	(substituted off) 71'
CM	8	(England) Tom Cleverley	(yellow card) 14'
CM	16	(England) Fabian Delph (c)	(yellow card) 37'
RW	28	(France) Charles N'Zogbia		(substituted off) 53'
LW	40	(England) Jack Grealish
CF	20	(Belgium) Christian Benteke
Substitutes:
GK	1	(United States) Brad Guzan
DF	2	(England) Nathan Baker
MF	7	(Netherlands) Leandro Bacuna		(substituted on) 68'
MF	9	(England) Scott Sinclair
MF	12	(England) Joe Cole
MF	24	(Colombia) Carlos Sánchez		(substituted on) 71'
FW	11	(England) Gabriel Agbonlahor	(yellow card) 83'	(substituted on) 53'
Manager:
(England) Tim Sherwood

Man of the match

- Santi Cazorla (Arsenal)

Match officials

- Assistant referees:
  - Darren England (South Yorkshire)
  - Simon Bennett (Staffordshire)
- Fourth official: Craig Pawson (South Yorkshire)
- Reserve official: Harry Lennard (East Sussex)

Match rules

- 90 minutes.
- 30 minutes of extra-time if necessary.
- Penalty shoot-out if scores still level.
- Seven named substitutes.
- Maximum of three substitutions.

Statistics
	Arsenal	Aston Villa
Goals scored	4	0
Possession	59%	41%
Shots on target	8	0
Shots off target	8	2
Corner kicks	8	0
Fouls	8	15
Offsides	5	2
Yellow cards	0	5
Red cards	0	0

== Post-match ==
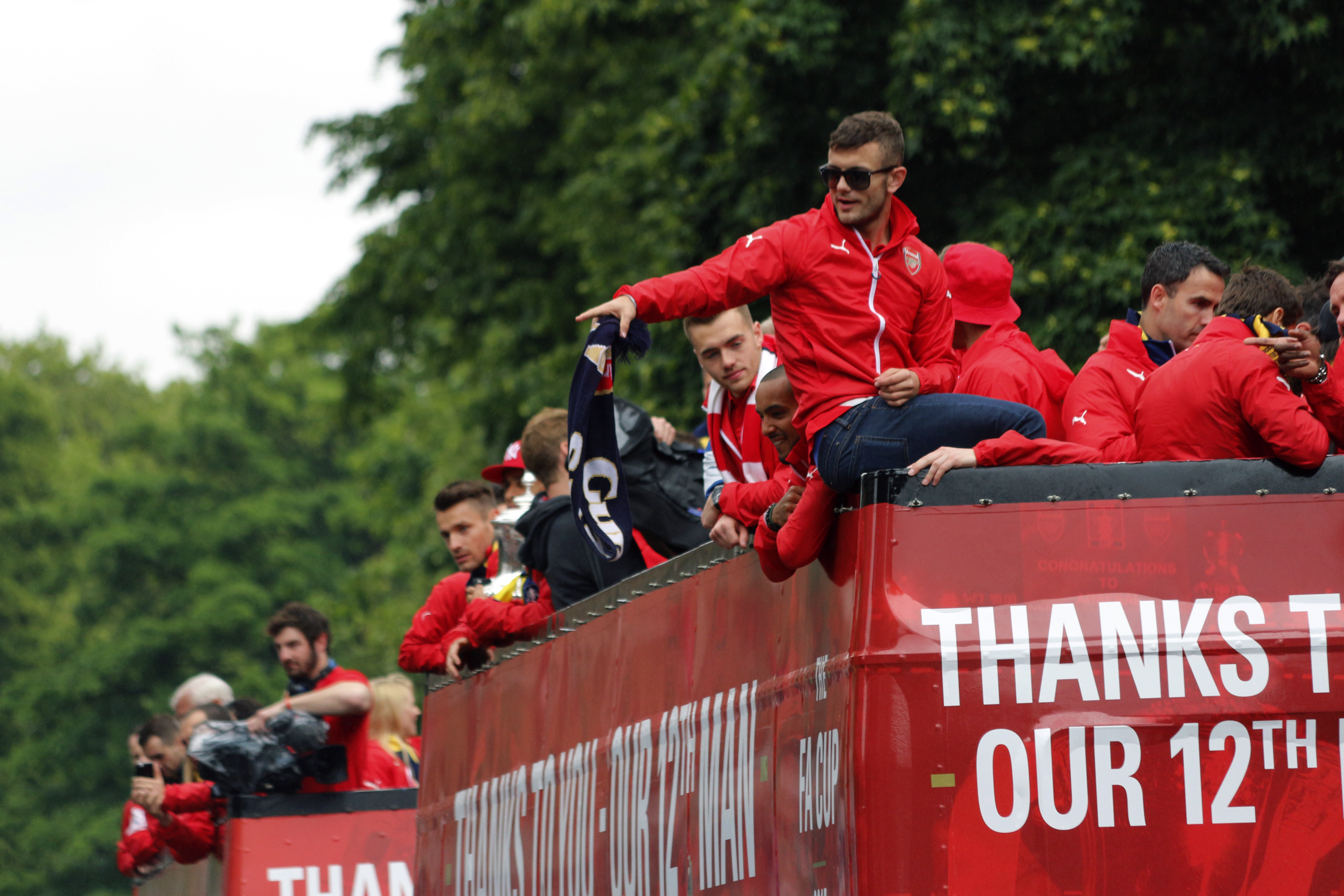
Arsenal's Jack Wilshere was charged with misconduct by the FA for his role in their victory parade.

This was the sixth FA Cup win for manager Arsène Wenger, putting him in joint first place for wins with George Ramsay. Wenger said "We have shown today that we are a real team. I’d like to congratulate everyone, my players, my staff, the supporters" and described it as "the perfect day". Mertesacker said "We deserved this today. We played on the front foot from the start and that makes a massive difference". Sherwood conceded that Arsenal had deserved to win, saying "I can't make any excuses for that today, Arsenal were too good for us. We couldn't impose ourselves on them or nullify what they had." His captain, Delph, agreed, noting "Arsenal showed why they deserved the win. We were up against it, we tried to dig deep but their quality shone through and we struggled."

The game was broadcast live in the UK on free-to-air TV on BBC One and on pay TV on BT Sport. It was the first FA Cup Final broadcast by the BBC in seven years and they restored the tradition of having an all-day build-up for the final, linking up with other BBC programmes. The game's viewership on BBC One peaked at 8.8 million with an average of 8 million.

On Arsenal's victory parade after winning the final, Jack Wilshere led fans in a chant calling local rivals Tottenham Hotspur "shit". Having previously been warned after a similar chant in the previous season's victory parade, The Football Association charged him with misconduct. He admitted the charge, was fined £40,000 and was "severely warned as to his future conduct".

Following a change in UEFA rules, this was the first season where runners-up in cup competitions did not enter the Europa League if the winners had already qualified for Europe. Therefore, as Arsenal had already qualified for the Champions League by finishing third in the Premier League, the remaining Europa League place went to Southampton, the highest-placed Premier League team that had not qualified for any European competition. As winners, Arsenal played Chelsea, winners of the Premier League, in the 2015 FA Community Shield at Wembley.

== Bibliography ==
- O'Leary, Leanne (2017). Employment and Labour Relations Law in the Premier League, NBA and International Rugby Union. Springer. ISBN 978-9-462-65158-6.
