= Aly Cissokho =

French footballer (born 1987)

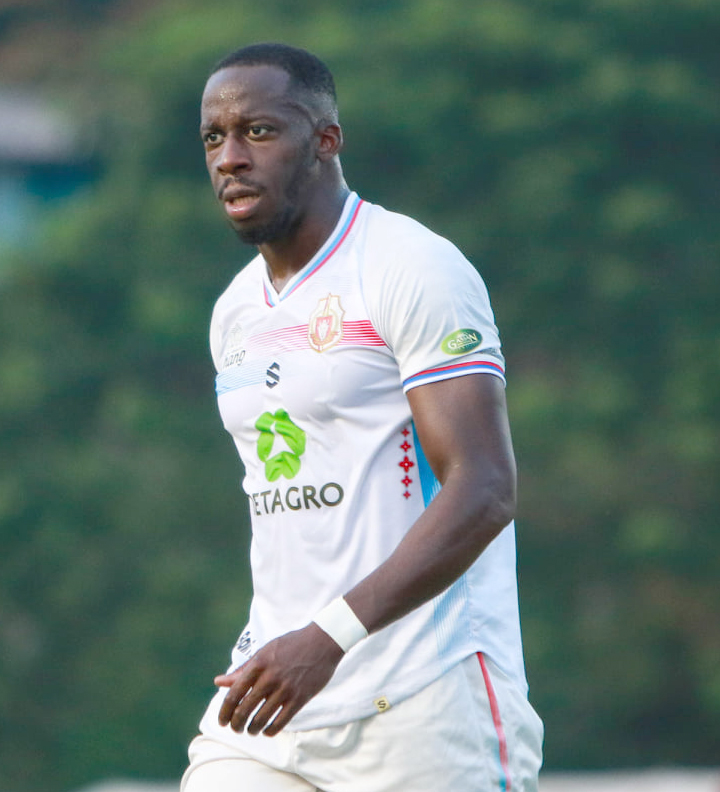
- Cissokho playing for Lamphun Warriors in 2022

Personal information
- Full name: Aly Cissokho
- Date of birth: 15 September 1987 (age 39)
- Place of birth: Blois, France
- Height: 1.81 m (5 ft 11 in)
- Positions: Left-back; centre-back

Team information
- Current team: Lamphun Warriors
- Number: 22

Youth career
- 1995–1999: AMJ Blois
- 1999–2003: Blois Foot
- 2003–2004: Saint-Jean-de-la-Ruelle
- 2004–2007: Gueugnon

Senior career*
Years	Team	Apps	(Gls)
2007–2008	Gueugnon	22	(0)
2008–2009	Vitória Setúbal	13	(0)
2009	Porto	15	(0)
2009–2012	Lyon	93	(1)
2012–2014	Valencia	25	(2)
2013–2014	→ Liverpool (loan)	15	(0)
2014–2017	Aston Villa	55	(0)
2015	→ Porto (loan)	2	(0)
2017	→ Olympiacos (loan)	3	(0)
2017–2018	Yeni Malatyaspor	30	(0)
2018–2020	Antalyaspor	22	(0)
2021–2024	Lamphun Warriors	80	(5)
2024–2025	Muangthong United	21	(1)
2025–	Lamphun Warriors	17	(0)

International career^{‡}
2010	France	1	(0)
- * Club domestic league appearances and goals as of 10 May 2026 ‡ National team caps and goals as of 11 August 2010

Aly Cissokho (French pronunciation: [ali sisɔko], born 15 September 1987) is a French professional footballer who plays as a left-back for Thai League 1 club Lamphun Warriors. He has been described as a "sprightly left-back with good speed and stamina".

Cissokho began his career playing for local clubs within his hometown, such as Blois Foot. In 2004, he signed with professional club Gueugnon and spent three years in the club's youth system before making his debut in the 2006–07 season. He spent only one season at the club and, in June 2008, signed with Portuguese club Vitória Setúbal in the Primeira Liga. After spending only half a season with the club, Cissokho departed Vitória for the league's defending champions Porto, where he won the Portuguese league and cup double and played in the UEFA Champions League for the first time. In July 2009, after a failed transfer attempt to Italian club AC Milan, he signed a five-year contract with French club Lyon for a fee of €15 million. At the beginning of the 2012–13 season Cissokho was sold to Valencia and was subsequently loaned to Liverpool for the 2013–14 season.

Cissokho is also a French international and earned his first call-up to the team in November 2009. He made his senior debut a year later in August 2010 in a friendly match against Norway.

== Club career ==
=== Early career ===
Cissokho was born and raised in Blois, the capital city of the Loir-et-Cher département, to Senegalese parents. He grew up learning the sport of football from his three older brothers who are also football players. Mamadou, the eldest, and Demba remain in Blois playing for local amateur clubs AFM Blois and Blois Foot 41, respectively, while Issa plays for professional club Nantes in Ligue 1.

Cissokho began his football career at the age of eight playing for AMJ Blois. He spent four years in the club's benjamins section and, in 1999, joined the biggest club in the city, Blois Foot 41. While at the club, Cissokho settled into his role as a left back with his coaches describing him as a player with great potential. Following his move from Porto to Lyon, Blois were compensated €162,500 due to an agreement Blois reached with both Gueugnon and Porto. The payment helped the club achieve some stability after a few years of financial difficulties. After four years at Blois, Cissokho had a year's stint at FCO Saint-Jean-de-la-Ruelle. In 2004, while playing with Saint-Jean-de-la-Ruelle, Cissokho was spotted by the assistant manager of professional club FC Gueugnon Jean Acédo who recommended the player join his club, who were playing in the second division of French football, Ligue 2. In July 2004, he signed with the club and was inserted into the club's youth academy.

After two years in the club's academy and another two years in the reserves, Cissokho made his professional debut on 25 May 2007 in a league match against Metz. He started and played the entire match in a 2–1 victory. Following the season, Cissokho signed his first professional contract agreeing to a three-year deal until June 2010. He was, subsequently, promoted to the senior team for the 2007–08 season and assigned the number 3 shirt by manager Alain Ravera. Under Ravera, Cissokho struggled for playing time often being utilized as a substitute, however, after the sacking of Ravera in October 2007, he was inserted into the starting lineup by new manager Alex Dupont. He appeared in 22 league matches during the campaign, starting in 15, but could not prevent Gueugnon from finishing last in the league, which meant relegation to the Championnat National.

On 2 June 2008, Primeira Liga club Vitória de Setúbal confirmed on its website that the club had signed Cissokho to a three-year contract until 2011. He made his debut for the club on 22 August 2008 in a match against Vitória de Guimarães playing the entire match in a 1–1 draw. Cissokho appeared in 15 league matches for the club and, also, made his European debut in a UEFA Cup match against Dutch club SC Heerenveen.

=== Porto ===
After positive displays for Vitória de Setúbal, on 9 January 2009, the defending champions Porto announced the club had acquired 60% of Cissokho's rights for a modest fee of €300,000. Upon his arrival, Cissokho was given the number 28 shirt and immediately inserted into the starting lineup by manager Jesualdo Ferreira making his debut 17 January in a Taça da Liga match against Académica de Coimbra. In the league, Cissokho appeared in 15 matches with the club going undefeated in that span. The unbeaten streak led to the club winning its fourth consecutive league title and giving Cissokho his first major honour.

In the UEFA Champions League, Cissokho made his debut on 24 February 2009 in the opening leg of the team's first knockout round tie against Spanish club Atlético Madrid. The match finished 2–2 and Porto won the tie by the same scoreline via the away goals rule. In the quarter-finals, Porto faced English club Manchester United and Cissokho was tasked with the objective of containing the 2008 FIFA World Player of the Year Cristiano Ronaldo. Despite putting up a strong effort in the first leg, which ended 2–2 at Old Trafford, Porto were defeated 3–2 on aggregate after losing 1–0 at the Estádio do Dragão. On 31 May, Porto completed the league and cup double after defeating Paços de Ferreira 1–0 in the 2009 final of the Taça de Portugal. Cissokho played the entire match.

==== Transfer saga ====
On 14 June 2009, Italian club A.C. Milan announced the club had signed Cissokho, subject to medical, with a reported deal of €15 million. Cissokho underwent his medical on 16 June, but the next day, it was revealed he had failed it due to a problem with his teeth that could indicate potential spinal problems, and that the move was in jeopardy of collapse. Later that day, Cissokho declared he had passed a second medical he undertook, and that he had subsequently signed a pre-contract. In the meantime, Milan tried to re-negotiate the bid on a loan basis due to Cissokho's health concerns. As the parties failed to reach an agreement, Milan general manager Adriano Galliani announced the deal was cancelled.

=== Lyon ===
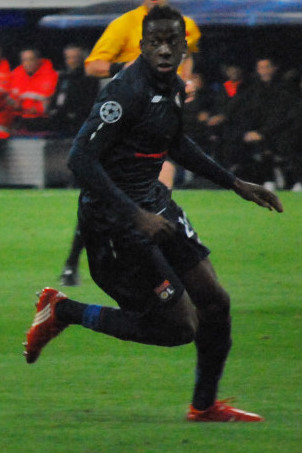
Cissokho playing for Lyon in 2010

On 18 July, French club Olympique Lyonnais announced the club had reached an agreement with Porto for the transfer of Cissokho, in a deal which equaled Milan's €15 million bid. However, Porto remain eligible to receive 20% of the added value/differential value if Lyon sold him for a higher price. Cissokho successfully passed his medical and agreed to a five-year contract. He was presented to the media, along with fellow new signing Michel Bastos, on 20 July and was assigned the number 20 shirt.

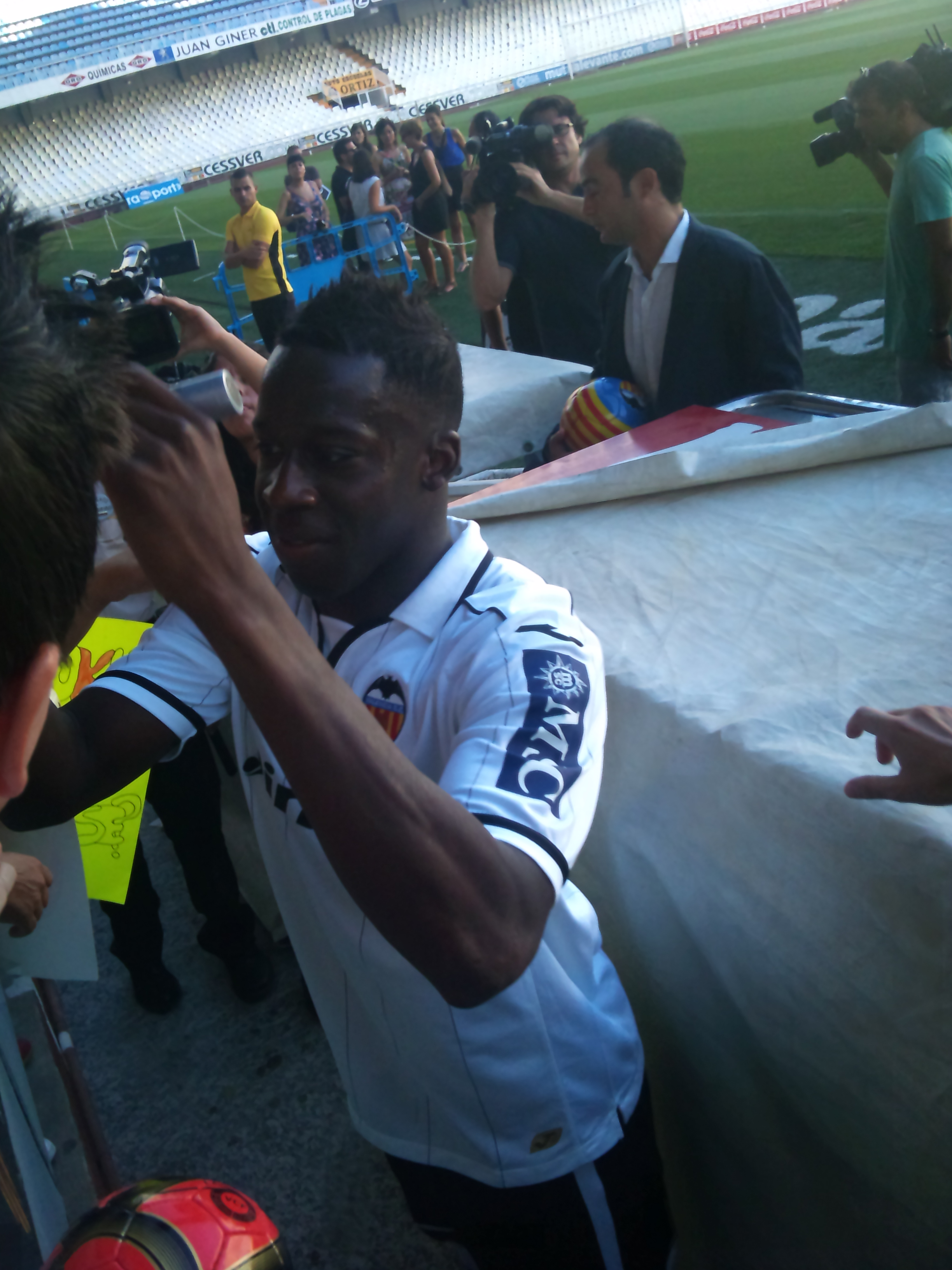
Cissokho at his presentation at the Mestalla Stadium as a Valencia player

Cissokho was immediately inserted to the starting 11 by manager Claude Puel, replacing the Italian international Fabio Grosso, who departed for Juventus. He made his debut for Lyon in the team's opening league match of the season, a 2–2 draw with Le Mans in which Cissokho played the entire match. On 26 September 2009, Cissokho assisted on the equalizing goal, scored by Yannis Tafer, in the 52nd minute of a league match against Toulouse. Lyon later won 2–1 with a goal from Bafétimbi Gomis. On 9 December, he scored his first professional goal in Lyon's 4–0 thrashing of Hungarian club Debrecen. Two weeks later, he provided his second league assist of the season on Lyon's only goal in the team's 2–1 loss to Montpellier.

=== Valencia ===
On 23 August 2012, Valencia CF announced on their official website they had completed a deal to sign Cissokho for the next four seasons, in exchange for a €5 million and €1 million variable and a portion of future transfer fee Valencia received. He made his official debut against FC Barcelona, at an eventual 1–0 away loss. On 15 September, Cissokho's 25th birthday, he scored his first goal, which also turned out to be the winning goal, for Valencia in a 2–1 win over Celta de Vigo at the Mestalla Stadium.

==== Liverpool (loan) ====
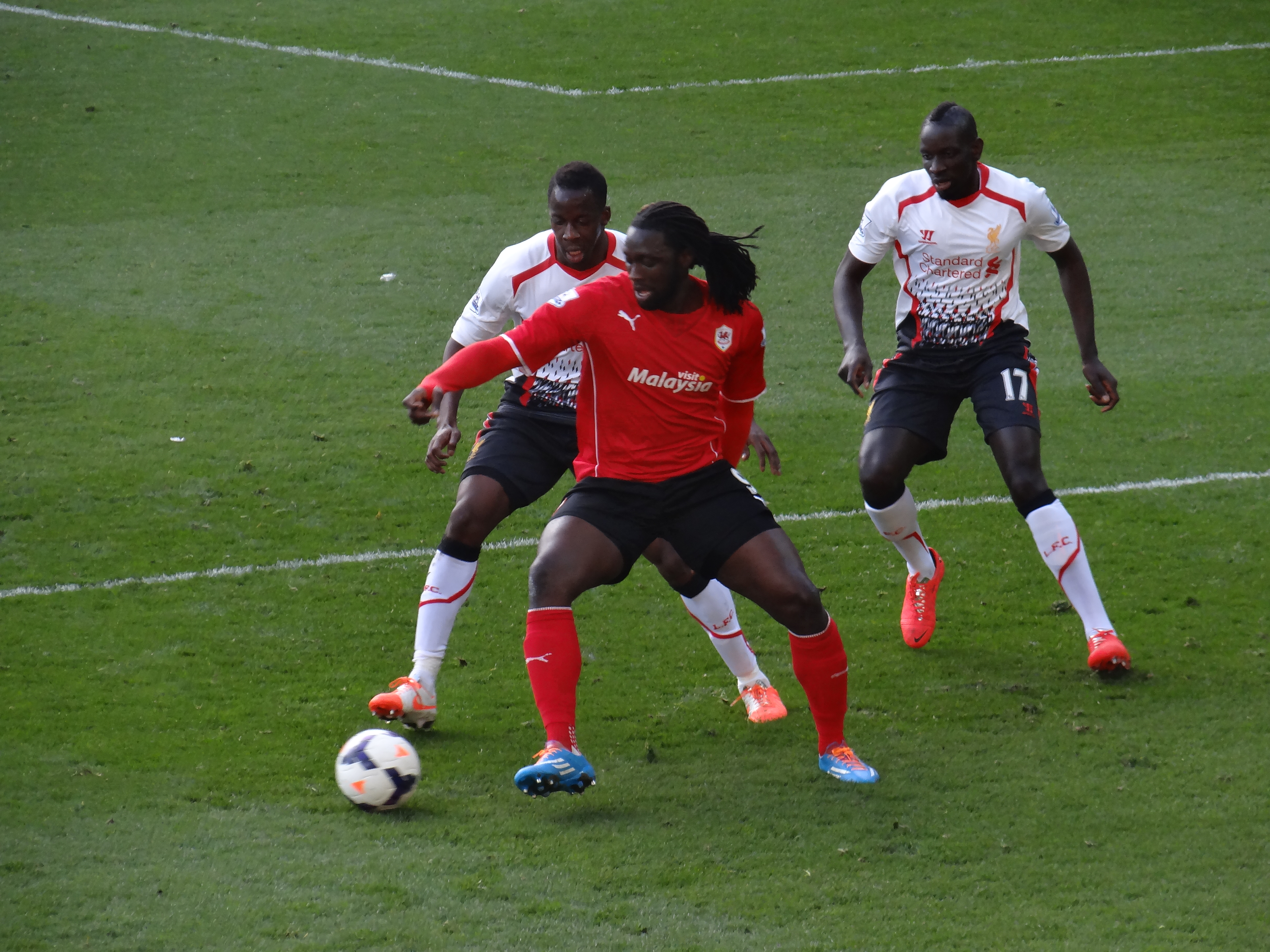
Cissokho playing with Liverpool challenging Cardiff City's Kenwyne Jones in 2014

On 20 August 2013, Cissokho signed for English side Liverpool on a season-long loan deal. He made his Premier League debut four days later away to Aston Villa, being substituted on in the 69th minute. He was ruled out for six weeks after an injury which caused him to be taken off after ten minutes in the League Cup match against Notts County. He made his first assist for Luis Suárez's second goal in a 4–1 victory over West Bromwich Albion, via an inadvertent rebound. He soon fell out of favour after making six appearances for the senior team. Cissokho returned to first-team action on 26 December against Manchester City in the absence of injured Jon Flanagan in a narrow 2–1 defeat at the City of Manchester Stadium. Cissokho made his second and final goal contribution for Liverpool at Stoke City in January, when his shot deflected off the groin of Ryan Shawcross for an own goal after five minutes to open a 5–3 win.

=== Aston Villa ===
On 8 August 2014, Cissokho signed a four-year deal with Premier League club Aston Villa. He impressed during his debut – the first match of the 2014–15 Premier League season against Stoke City, which Villa won 1–0. On 23 August 2014, in the match against Newcastle United, Cissokho suffered an ankle injury, sidelining him for one week. On 20 September 2014, he scored an own goal while attempting to clear Arsenal's Kieran Gibbs' shot. On 24 February 2015, he sustained a groin/pelvis injury during training, sidelining him for two months. He made a total of 27 appearances and helped Villa reach the FA Cup final.

==== Loan to Porto and premature return ====
On 5 August 2015, Cissokho returned to Portuguese club Porto on a season-long loan, rejoining the side after a short spell in 2009. However, on 18 December, after only two appearances in the Primeira Liga, he was recalled to Aston Villa by new Villa manager Rémi Garde – who had managed him at Lyon – to cover after Jordan Amavi was ruled out for the season, although Cissokho was not eligible to play until the new year. He was eventually issued squad number 43 and went straight into the starting 11 against fellow relegation candidates Sunderland in a 3–1 defeat on 2 January 2016.

==== Loan to Olympiacos ====
On 14 January 2017, Olympiacos officially announced Cissokho had joined the club on a six-month loan from Aston Villa, with the option of permanently purchasing the player during the summer 2017 transfer window, subject to satisfactory performances. At the end of season, Cissokho returned to Aston Villa.

=== Yeni Malatyaspor ===
On 2 August 2017, Cissokho signed for Turkish Süper Lig newcomers Yeni Malatyaspor.

=== Antalyaspor ===
On 27 July 2018, he signed for Antalyaspor for an undisclosed fee.

=== Lamphun Warriors ===
On 27 June 2021, Cissokho signed with Lamphun Warrior of the Thai League 2. Lamphun Warriors have entered as the promoted teams from the 2021–22 Thai League 2 as a champions. In the 2022–23 Thai League 1, he was appointed captain of the team. On 23 May 2023, Lamphun Warrior announced a contract renewal with Cissokho, Out until the 2023-24 season. On 19 June 2024, Lamphun Warriors announced he would be leaving the club in the summer when his contract expires.

=== Muangthong United ===
On 5 July 2024, Cissokho signed with Muangthong United of the Thai League 1. On 8 February 2025, Cissokho scored his first and decisive late goal for the club against Chiangrai United in a 2–1 win.

== International career ==
Due to hovering in the second division with Gueugnon, Cissokho never earned call-ups with any of France's international youth teams. However, he did earn the attention of the Senegalese Football Federation ("FSF"), which governs the Senegal national team. The FSF wanted the player to play for the nation of his ancestors, and Cissokho initially accepted; however, he lost confidence in the FSF when it lost his passport and informed him it preferred homegrown players on the national team. After excelling in Portugal, the FSF contacted him again, but Cissokho refused contact, stating he had not made up his mind. On 3 October 2009, Cissokho announced he would be open to representing the France national team, but his main focus was currently with his new club.

On 5 November 2009, Cissokho was included in the France squad by coach Raymond Domenech for the team's 2010 FIFA World Cup qualification playoff round tie against the Republic of Ireland to serve as backup to Patrice Evra. Cissokho described the call up as a "childhood dream". He made the substitutes' bench for the first match played at Croke Park, Dublin, but remained unused. In the second leg, he did not make the bench as France nonetheless earned a place in the 2010 World Cup. On 25 February 2010, he received his second call-up to the team for the friendly against Spain on 3 March, but did not make an appearance. On 11 May, he was named to the 30-man preliminary list by Domenech to play in the 2010 World Cup finals, but failed to make the final 23-man squad.

On 5 August 2010, Cissokho was called up to the team by new manager Laurent Blanc for the nation's friendly against Norway on 11 August. He made his international debut in the match, starting and playing the full match as left-back.

== Career statistics ==
=== Club ===
As of match played 29 June 2017

Appearances and goals by club, season and competition
Club	Season	League			National cup		League cup		Continental		Other (Note: Includes Trophée des champions, UEFA Super Cup, Intercontinental Cup, FIFA Club World Cup.)		Total	
Club	Season	Division	Apps	Goals	Apps	Goals	Apps	Goals	Apps	Goals	Apps	Goals	Apps	Goals
Gueugnon	2006–07	Ligue 2	1	0	0	0	1	0	—		—		2	0
Gueugnon	2007–08	Ligue 2	21	0	2	0	0	0	—		—		23	0
Gueugnon	Total		22	0	2	0	1	0	—		—		25	0
Vitória Setúbal	2008–09	Primeira Liga	13	0	3	0	0	0	2	0	—		18	0
Porto	2008–09	Primeira Liga	15	0	4	0	0	0	4	0	—		23	0
Lyon	2009–10	Ligue 1	31	0	1	0	2	0	14	1	0	0	48	1
Lyon	2010–11	Ligue 1	29	1	2	0	0	0	6	0	0	0	37	1
Lyon	2011–12	Ligue 1	31	0	4	0	4	0	9	0	0	0	48	0
Lyon	2012–13	Ligue 1	2	0	0	0	0	0	0	0	1	0	3	0
Lyon	Total		93	1	7	0	6	0	29	1	1	0	136	2
Valencia	2012–13	La Liga	25	2	4	0	0	0	7	0	0	0	36	2
Liverpool (loan)	2013–14	Premier League	15	0	3	0	1	0	0	0	0	0	19	0
Aston Villa	2014–15	Premier League	25	0	2	0	0	0	—		—		27	0
Aston Villa	2015–16	Premier League	18	0	1	0	0	0	—		—		19	0
Aston Villa	2016–17	Championship	12	0	0	0	0	0	—		—		12	0
Aston Villa	Total		55	0	3	0	0	0	—		—		58	0
Porto (loan)	2015–16	Primeira Liga	2	0	1	0	0	0	0	0	—		4	0
Olympiacos (loan)	2016–17	Super League Greece	3	0	3	1	0	0	4	0	—		10	1
Career total			243	3	30	1	8	0	46	1	1	0	328	5

=== International ===
Appearances and goals by national team and year
National team	Year	Apps	Goals
France	2010	1	0
Total		1	0

== Honours ==
Porto

- Primeira Liga: 2008–09
- Taça de Portugal: 2008–09

Lyon

- Coupe de France: 2011–12
- Trophée des Champions: 2012

Lamphun Warrior

- Thai League 2: 2021–22
