= Tom Fox (executive) =

American businessman

- Education: Miami University
- Occupation: Sports marketing executive
- Known for: President of FaZe Clan. Chief executive, Aston Villa; Chief Operating Officer, Arsenal; Managing Director, NBA Asia

Tom Fox is an American sports and esports executive, most recently he is the President of FaZe Clan.

Fox was the chief executive of Aston Villa in the Premier League from 2014 until 2016, and later the president of the San Jose Earthquakes from 2017 to 2020. Between 2009 and 2014 he was the chief commercial officer of Arsenal and was formerly the chief executive of NBA Asia and the Senior Vice President of Gatorade at PepsiCo.

Fox was appointed as CEO of Aston Villa on 21 August 2014 succeeding Paul Faulkner in the role.
