= Ashley Westwood (footballer, born 1990) =

English footballer (born 1990)

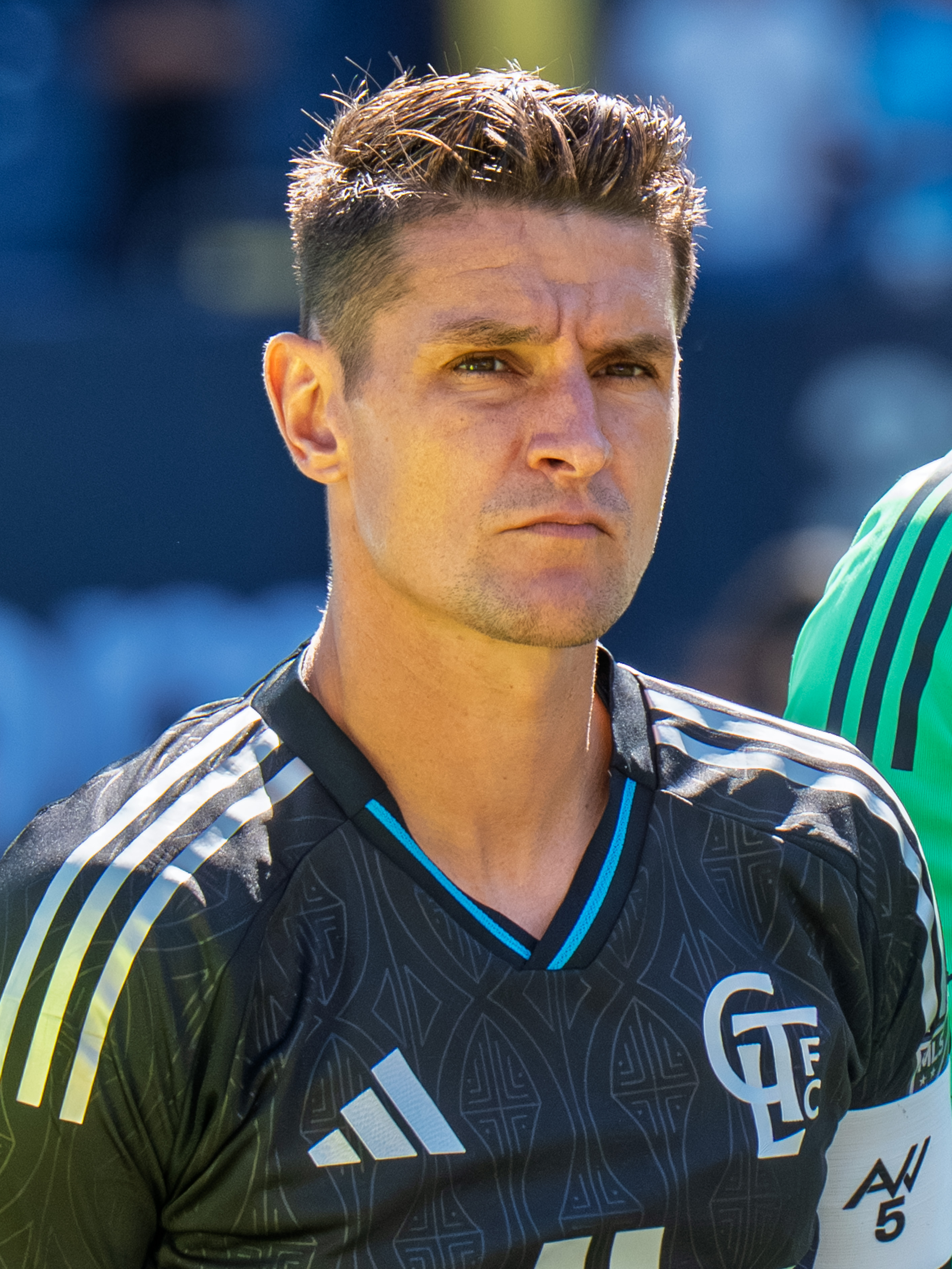
- Westwood in 2025

Personal information
- Full name: Ashley Roy Westwood
- Date of birth: 1 April 1990 (age 36)
- Place of birth: Nantwich, England
- Height: 5 ft 9 in (1.75 m)
- Position: Midfielder

Team information
- Current team: Charlotte FC
- Number: 8

Youth career
- –2008: Crewe Alexandra

Senior career*
| Years | Team | Apps | (Gls) |
| 2008–2012 | Crewe Alexandra | 128 | (14) |
| 2012–2017 | Aston Villa | 147 | (5) |
| 2017–2023 | Burnley | 162 | (7) |
| 2023– | Charlotte FC | 125 | (9) |
- * Club domestic league appearances and goals as of 19:44, 15 November 2026 (UTC)

Ashley Roy Westwood (born 1 April 1990) is an English professional footballer who plays as a defensive midfielder for and captains Major League Soccer club Charlotte FC.

Westwood's first club was Crewe Alexandra, where he spent his first season on loan at his hometown club Nantwich Town from the Northern Premier League Premier Division. After five seasons and 128 league appearances in League One and League Two for Crewe, Westwood joined Premier League club Aston Villa, where he scored his first Premier League goal in his second season with them. Six months after Aston Villa dropped out of the Premier League, in January 2017, Westwood joined Burnley, returning to the Premier League in the process. In the 2018–19 season, he became Burnley's Player of the Season.

== Career ==
=== Crewe Alexandra ===
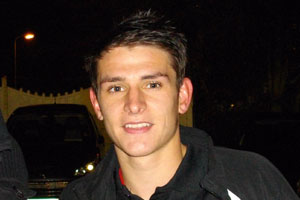
Westwood in 2010

Born in Nantwich, Cheshire, Westwood started his career in the academy at Crewe Alexandra. He signed his first professional contract in April 2008, along with Luke Danville, Chris Clements, Josh Thompson, A-Jay Leitch-Smith and Luke Murphy. He joined hometown club Nantwich Town, playing in the Northern Premier League Premier Division, on loan in 2008.

The following season saw Westwood break into first team appearing 38 times for the club along with six goals – the first coming in a 3–2 away win at Chesterfield. The season, however, did see Westwood receive his first career red card in the 0–1 home defeat to Notts County for squaring up to Luke Rodgers after the pair tussled for the ball, the County striker was sent off for the incident as well. The young midfielder impressed the Crewe management over the season and was rewarded with a new two-year contract in December and his performances over the season were further recognised when he was named the club's player of the season.

A further 46 appearances followed in the 2010–11 season along with six goals, including two in the 3–3 home draw to Torquay United. Following a string of impressive performances, Westwood signed a new deal intended to keep him at the club until 2014 midway through the campaign.

With the release of David Artell in the summer of 2012, Westwood was handed the club captaincy of Crewe by manager Steve Davis. The young midfielder made three league appearances before he was linked with a move to the Premier League with Swansea City. "It's the first time he'll have had this sort of speculation in his career", Crewe manager Steve Davis commented before adding: "he's got to be professional in how he deals with it".

=== Aston Villa ===
Despite the speculation of a transfer to Swansea City, talks between the two clubs broke down as the South Wales club was unable to match the asking price set by the Railwaymen. With talks of the deal reaching a stumbling block, Aston Villa were quick to capitalise and signed the midfielder on the final day of the summer 2012 transfer window. Westwood signed on a four-year deal with the Birmingham based club for a fee believed to be around £2 million.

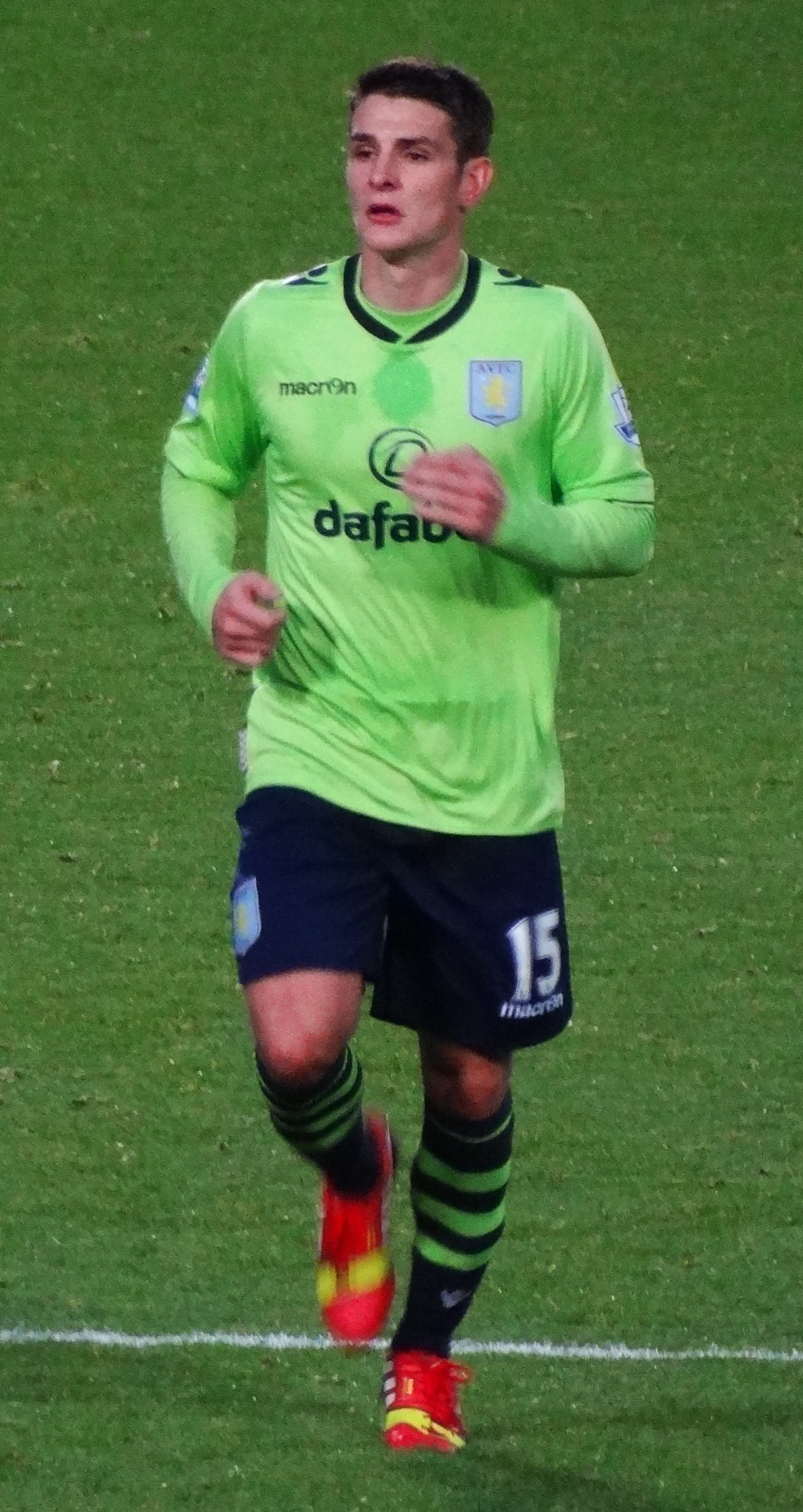
Westwood playing for Aston Villa in 2013

He made his debut on 15 September 2012, coming on as a second-half substitute for Stephen Ireland during a 2–0 win at home to Swansea City. On 3 November, Westwood made his first league start for Villa in a 1–0 win away at Sunderland. The young midfielder was highly praised for his role in the win, alongside Barry Bannan. On 15 July 2013, Westwood signed a new four-year contract keeping him at the club until summer 2017. He scored his first goal for the club against local rivals West Bromwich Albion in a 2–2 draw at The Hawthorns. On 29 March 2014, he scored in a 4–1 defeat away to Manchester United at Old Trafford. On 3 May 2014, Westwood scored after 54 seconds against Hull City in a 3–1 home victory that helped ensure Villa avoided relegation.

On 12 August 2015, Westwood signed a new five-year contract with the Villans.

=== Burnley ===
On 31 January 2017, Westwood signed for Premier League club Burnley on a three-and-a-half-year contract, with the option of a further year. He scored his first goal for Burnley on 10 March 2019, opening the scoring direct from a corner in a 4–2 defeat by Liverpool at Anfield. He was voted Burnley's player of the season for 2018–19 by both supporters and players. On 3 October 2020, Westwood scored on his 100th Premier League appearance for Burnley in a 3–1 defeat against Newcastle United at St James' Park.

During Burnley's game against West Ham United at the London Stadium on 17 April 2022, Westwood suffered a serious ankle injury in a collision with Nikola Vlašić, ruling him out for the rest of the season.

=== Charlotte ===
On 7 January 2023, Westwood signed for Major League Soccer club Charlotte FC on a contract until 2024.

== Playing style ==
Westwood operates primarily as a deep-lying playmaker although he is capable of playing in a role higher up the midfield as well as right back. After his transfer to Aston Villa, Westwood compared himself to Michael Carrick adding that he is "someone who stays out of the limelight and keeps it simple, retaining the ball and laying it off to team-mates".

== Career statistics ==
As of match played 25 October 2023

Appearances and goals by club, season and competition
| Club | Season | League | | | FA Cup | | League Cup | | Other | | Total | |
| Club | Season | Division | Apps | Goals | Apps | Goals | Apps | Goals | Apps | Goals | Apps | Goals |
|---|---|---|---|---|---|---|---|---|---|---|---|---|
| Crewe Alexandra | 2008–09 | League One | 2 | 0 | 0 | 0 | 0 | 0 | 0 | 0 | 2 | 0 |
| Crewe Alexandra | 2009–10 | League Two | 36 | 6 | 1 | 0 | 1 | 0 | 0 | 0 | 38 | 6 |
| Crewe Alexandra | 2010–11 | League Two | 46 | 5 | 1 | 1 | 2 | 0 | 2 (Note: Appearances in Football League Trophy) | 0 | 51 | 6 |
| Crewe Alexandra | 2011–12 | League Two | 41 | 3 | 1 | 0 | 0 | 0 | 5 (Note: Two appearances in Football League Trophy, three in League Two play-offs) | 0 | 47 | 3 |
| Crewe Alexandra | 2012–13 | League One | 3 | 0 | — | | 2 | 0 | — | | 5 | 0 |
| Crewe Alexandra | Total | | 128 | 14 | 3 | 1 | 5 | 0 | 7 | 0 | 143 | 15 |
| Aston Villa | 2012–13 | Premier League | 30 | 0 | 1 | 0 | — | | — | | 31 | 0 |
| Aston Villa | 2013–14 | Premier League | 35 | 3 | 1 | 0 | 1 | 0 | — | | 37 | 3 |
| Aston Villa | 2014–15 | Premier League | 27 | 0 | 6 | 0 | 1 | 0 | — | | 34 | 0 |
| Aston Villa | 2015–16 | Premier League | 32 | 2 | 3 | 0 | 2 | 0 | — | | 37 | 2 |
| Aston Villa | 2016–17 | Championship | 23 | 0 | 0 | 0 | 0 | 0 | — | | 23 | 0 |
| Aston Villa | Total | | 147 | 5 | 11 | 0 | 4 | 0 | — | | 162 | 5 |
| Burnley | 2016–17 | Premier League | 9 | 0 | 1 | 0 | — | | — | | 10 | 0 |
| Burnley | 2017–18 | Premier League | 19 | 0 | 1 | 0 | 2 | 0 | — | | 22 | 0 |
| Burnley | 2018–19 | Premier League | 34 | 2 | 1 | 0 | 1 | 0 | 5 (Note: Appearances in UEFA Europa League) | 0 | 41 | 2 |
| Burnley | 2019–20 | Premier League | 35 | 2 | 2 | 0 | 0 | 0 | — | | 37 | 2 |
| Burnley | 2020–21 | Premier League | 38 | 3 | 1 | 0 | 3 | 0 | — | | 42 | 3 |
| Burnley | 2021–22 | Premier League | 27 | 0 | 1 | 0 | 1 | 0 | — | | 29 | 0 |
| Burnley | 2022–23 | Championship | 0 | 0 | 0 | 0 | 0 | 0 | — | | 0 | 0 |
| Burnley | Total | | 162 | 7 | 7 | 0 | 7 | 0 | 5 | 0 | 181 | 7 |
| Charlotte FC | 2023 | Major League Soccer | 29 | 3 | 2 | 0 | — | | 6 (Note: Five appearances in Leagues Cup, one in MLS Cup Playoffs) | 0 | 37 | 3 |
| Career total | | | 466 | 29 | 23 | 1 | 16 | 0 | 18 | 0 | 523 | 30 |

== Honours ==
Crewe Alexandra

- Football League Two play-offs: 2012

Aston Villa

- FA Cup runner-up: 2014–15

Individual

- Burnley Player of the Year: 2018–19
- MLS All-Star: 2026
