= 2010–11 Crewe Alexandra F.C. season =

Crewe Alexandra
2010–11 season
- Chairman: John Bowler
- Manager: Dario Gradi
- League Two: 2009–10: 18th; 2010–11: 10th
- FA Cup: First round (out)
- League Cup: Second round (out)
- Football League Trophy: Area QF (out)
- Top goalscorer: Donaldson (28); All: Donaldson (29)
- Highest home attendance: 7,183 (vs Port Vale, 15 January 2011)
- Lowest home attendance: 3,171 (vs Barnet, 21 August 2010)
- Average home league attendance: 4,073
- All statistics correct as of 21 May 2011.

This article details Crewe Alexandra's 2010–11 season in League Two. This was Crewe's 87th competitive season in the English Football League.

== Players ==
=== Squad information ===
N	Pos.	Nat.	Name	Age	EU	Since	App	Goals	Ends	Transfer fee	Notes
1	GK	(England)	Phillips	32	EU	2010	32	0	30 Jun 2012	Free	
2	DF	(England)	Tootle	19	EU	2009	72	1	30 Jun 2013	Youth system	
3	DF	(England)	Blanchett	23	EU	2010	44	0	30 Jun 2011	Free	
4	DF	(England)	A.R. Westwood	20	EU	2008	91	12	30 Jun 2013	Youth system	
5	DF	(Gibraltar)	Artell	29	EU	2010	44	5	30 Jun 2012	Free	
6	DF	(Cameroon)	Ada	25	Non-EU	2009	66	1	30 Jun 2011	Free	
7	FW	(England)	Donaldson	26	EU	2008	130	49	30 Jun 2011	£125,000	
8	MF	(England)	Murphy	20	EU	2008	89	8	30 Jun 2011	Youth system	
9	FW	(Democratic Republic of the Congo)	Zola	25	Non-EU	2008	79	22	30 Jun 2011	£200,000	On loan at Burton Albion
10	FW	(England)	Miller	22	EU	2006	142	38	30 Jun 2011	Youth system	
11	MF	(Jamaica) (England)	Grant	22	EU	2008	106	18	30 Jun 2011	£130,000	
12	MF	(England)	Bell	27	EU	2010	50	2	30 Jun 2012	Free	
13	GK	(Wales)	Taylor	20	EU	2010	49	0	8 Sep 2010	Loan	On loan from Chelsea
14	FW	(England)	Moore	21	EU	2007	155	15	30 Jun 2011	Youth system	
15	DF	(England)	Mitchel-King	26	EU	2009	51	0	30 Jun 2011	Free	
16	FW	(England)	Connerton	20	EU	2009	2	0	30 Jun 2012	Undisclosed	
17	DF	(England)	Shelley	20	EU	2008	50	8	30 Jun 2011	Youth system	
18	FW	(England)	Leitch-Smith	20	EU	2008	19	5	30 Jun 2011	Youth system	
19	MF	(England)	Mellor	19	EU	2009	1	0	30 Jun 2011	Youth system	
20	DF	(England)	Martin	23	EU	2009	6	1	30 Jun 2012	Undisclosed	
21	MF	(England)	Sarcevic	18	EU	2010	6	1	30 Jun 2011	Undisclosed	
22	DF	(England)	Davis	18	EU	2009	2	0	30 Jun 2011	Youth system	
23	DF	(England)	Dugdale	22	EU	2010	21	0	31 Jan 2011	Free	
24	GK	(Poland)	Fogler	25	EU	2010	0	0	30 Jun 2011	Free	
25	FW	(England)	Powell	16	EU	2010	19	0		Youth system	
28	DF	(England)	A.M. Westwood	33	EU	2011	8	0		Free	
29	MF	(England)	Clayton	15	EU	2011	2	0		Youth system	
30	MF	(England)	Turton	17	EU	2011	1	0		Youth system	
31	MF	(England)	Hughes	18	EU	2011	1	0		Youth system	

- Last updated: 21 May 2011
- Source: Wikipedia players' articles, Crewe Alexandra, soccerbase
- Ordered by Squad Number.

Appearances (starts and substitute appearances) and goals include those in the League (and playoffs), FA Cup, League Cup and Football League Trophy.

=== Squad stats ===
				Total			League Two		FA Cup		Football League Cup		Football League Trophy	
No.	Pos.	Nat.	Name	Sts	App	Gls	App	Gls	App	Gls	App	Gls	App	Gls
1	GK	(England)	Phillips	2	3		3							
2	DF	(England)	Tootle	41	44		39		1		2		2	
3	DF	(England)	Blanchett	42	44		39		1		2		2	
4	DF	(England)	AR Westwood	50	51	6	46	5	1	1	2		2	
5	DF	(Gibraltar)	Artell	44	44	5	40	4	1		2		1	1
6	DF	(Cameroon)	Ada	44	45	1	40	1	1		2		2	
7	FW	(England)	Donaldson	47	48	29	43	28	1		2		2	1
8	MF	(England)	Murphy	41	44	3	39	3	1		2		2	
9	FW	(Democratic Republic of the Congo)	Zola	5	8	1	6	1			1		1	
10	FW	(England)	Miller	40	44	18	42	18			2			
11	MF	(Jamaica)	Grant	19	28	6	25	5	1		1		1	1
12	MF	(England)	Bell	49	50	2	45	1	1		2		2	1
13	GK	(Wales)	Taylor	50	49		44		1		2		2	
14	FW	(England)	Moore	31	42	6	37	6	1		2		2	
15	DF	(England)	Mitchel-King	10	16		14		1				1	
16	FW	(England)	Connerton		2		1				1			
17	DF	(England)	Shelley	17	26	6	25	6			1			
18	FW	(England)	Leitch-Smith	6	18	5	16	5	1				1	
19	MF	(England)	Mellor		1		1							
20	DF	(England)	Martin											
21	MF	(England)	Sarcevic		6	1	6	1						
22	DF	(England)	Davis		1		1							
23	DF	(England)	Dugdale	16	21	1	20	1					1	
24	GK	(Poland)	Fogler											
25	FW	(England)	Powell	1	18		16		1				1	
28	DF	(England)	AM Westwood	7	8		8							
29	MF	(England)	Clayton		2		2							
30	MF	(England)	Turton		1		1							
31	MF	(England)	Hughes		1		1							

Last updated: 21 May 2011
Source: Crewe Alexandra
Ordered by Squad Numbers
0 shown as blank

==== Disciplinary record ====
N	Pos.	Nat.	Name	Yellow card	Second yellow card	Red card	Notes
12	GK	(Wales)	Taylor	3	0	1	
7	FW	(England)	Donaldson	1	0	1	
10	FW	(England)	Miller	6	0	0	
12	MF	(England)	Bell	5	0	0	
23	DF	(England)	Dugdale	5	0	0	
2	DF	(England)	Tootle	4	0	0	
6	DF	(Cameroon)	Ada	4	0	0	
5	DF	(Gibraltar)	Artell	4	0	0	
4	DF	(England)	AR Westwood	3	0	0	
9	FW	(Democratic Republic of the Congo)	Zola	1	0	0	
8	MF	(England)	Murphy	1	0	0	
18	FW	(England)	Leitch-Smith	1	0	0	
14	FW	(England)	Moore	1	0	0	
3	DF	(England)	Blanchett	1	0	0	
28	DF	(England)	AM Westwood	1	0	0	

Last updated: 21 May 2011
Source: Crewe Alexandra
Only competitive matches
(yellow card) = Number of bookings; (second yellow card) = Number of sending offs after a second yellow card; (red card) = Number of sending offs by a direct red card.

==== Awards ====
===== Individual =====
Date	N	P	Nat.	Name	Award	Notes
23 Aug 2010	2	DF	(England)	Tootle	League Two Team of the Week	Source
23 Aug 2010	5	DF	(Gibraltar)	Artell	League Two Team of the Week	Source
23 Aug 2010	7	FW	(England)	Donaldson	League Two Team of the Week	Source
13 Sep 2010	5	DF	(England)	Artell	League Two Team of the Week	Source
13 Sep 2010	8	MF	(England)	Murphy	League Two Team of the Week	Source
27 Sep 2010	5	DF	(England)	Artell	League Two Team of the Week	Source
4 Oct 2010	12	MF	(England)	Bell	League Two Team of the Week	Source
18 Oct 2010	2	DF	(England)	Tootle	League Two Team of the Week	Source
25 Oct 2010	4	MF	(England)	AR Westwood	League Two Team of the Week	Source
13 Dec 2010	7	FW	(England)	Donaldson	League Two Team of the Week	Source
10 Jan 2011	2	DF	(England)	Tootle	League Two Team of the Week	Source
10 Jan 2011	7	FW	(England)	Donaldson	League Two Team of the Week	Source
Jan 2011			(England)	Gradi	League Two Manager of the Month	Source
7 Mar 2011	7	FW	(England)	Donaldson	League Two Team of the Week	Source
24 Mar 2011			(England)	Gradi	Contribution to League Football award	Source
Season	7	FW	(England)	Donaldson	League Two Golden Boot	Source

===== Club =====
Date	Period	Award	Notes
8 Apr 2011	W/E 7 Apr 2011	F&C Performance of the Week	Source 1 Source 2

=== Players in and out ===
==== In ====
No.	Pos.	Nat.	Name	Age	EU	Moving from	Type	Transfer window	Ends	Transfer fee	Source
21	MF	(England)	Sarcevic	18	EU	Woodley Sports	Transfer	Summer	30 Jun 2011	Undisclosed	Crewe Alexandra
12	MF	(England)	Bell	27	EU	Macclesfield Town	Transfer	Summer	20 Jun 2012	Free	Crewe Alexandra
5	DF	(Gibraltar)	Artell	29	EU	Morecambe	Transfer	Summer	30 Jun 2010	Free	Crewe Alexandra
1	GK	(England)	Phillips	32	EU	Bristol Rovers	Transfer	Summer	30 Jun 2012	Free	Crewe Alexandra
13	GK	(Wales)	Taylor	20	EU	Chelsea	Loan	Summer	8 Sep 2010	Loan	Crewe Alexandra
3	DF	(England)	Blanchett	23	EU	Peterborough United	Transfer	Summer	30 Jun 2011	Free	Crewe Alexandra
24	GK	(Poland)	Fogler	25	EU	Świt Nowy Dwór Mazowiecki	Transfer	Summer	30 Jun 2011	Free	The Telegraph
23	DF	(England)	Dugdale	22	EU	A.F.C. Telford United	Transfer	Summer	31 Jan 2011	Free	Crewe Alexandra
28	DF	(England)	AM Westwood	34	EU	Kettering Town	Transfer	Winter	31 Jun 2011	Free	Crewe Alexandra

==== Out ====
No.	Pos.	Nat.	Name	Age	EU	Moving to	Type	Transfer window	Transfer fee	Source
3	DF	(England)	Jones	26	EU	Exeter City	Released	Summer	Free	exetercityfc.co.uk
4	MF	(England)	Schumacher	26	EU	Bury	Released	Summer	Free	Crewe Alexandra
5	DF	(England)	O'Donnell	24	EU	Shrewsbury Town	Released	Summer	Free	Crewe Alexandra
21	MF	(England)	Clements	20	EU	Free agent	Released	Summer	Free	Crewe Alexandra
2	DF	(England)	Brayford	22	EU	Derby County	Transfer	Summer	Undisclosed	Crewe Alexandra
16	MF	(England)	Bailey	21	EU	Derby County	Transfer	Summer	Undisclosed	Crewe Alexandra
13	GK	(England)	Legzdins	23	EU	Burton Albion	Released	Summer	Free	burtonalbionfc.co.uk
9	FW	(Democratic Republic of the Congo)	Zola	26		Burton Albion	Loan	Winter	Loan	Crewe Alexandra

Last updated: 29 January 2011
EU = if holds or not a European Union passport; Country: when 2 flags, 1st flag = country that plays for internationally, 2nd flag = country of birth; N = number on jersey; P = Position (for position name, pause mouse pointer on abbreviation); Name = Name on jersey (for more extensive name, pause mouse pointer on name); Age = age on the day of the signing; Moving from = only indicate the club the player was playing before start playing for this club in this season, for the type of the moving see Status column; Moving to = only indicates the club the player is going to play next, for the type of the moving see Status column; Ends = when the player's current contract ends; n/a = Not applicable.

== Club ==
=== Coaching staff ===
Position	Staff
First Team Manager	Dario Gradi MBE
Assistant Manager	Steve Davis
Assistant Manager (Player Recruitment)	Neil Baker
Assistant Academy Manager	James Collins
Assistant Academy Manager	Neil Critchley
Head physiotherapist	Rob Sharp
Physiotherapist	Nick Oakley
Fitness Coach	Andy Franks
Academy Recruitment Officer	Phil Swift
Academy Operations Manager	Paul Anthrobus

Last updated: 11 May 2010
Source: Crewe Alexandra Staff

=== Other information ===
Chairman	John Bowler
Vice Chairman	Norman Hassall
Director	Richard Clayton
Director	Dario Gradi MBE
Director	Mark Hassall
Director	Jim McMillan
Director	Daniel Potts
Director	David Rowlinson
Director	Jimmy Rowlinson
Head Groundsman	John Huxley
Assistant Groundsman	Andrew Wareham
Club Doctor	Dr Mike Freeman
Ground (capacity and dimensions)	Alexandra Stadium (10,153 / 100 × 66 yd)

Updated to match played 11 May 2010
Source: Crewe Alexandra Staff

=== Kits ===
Home; Sponsors: Mornflake Oats	Away; Sponsors: Mornflake Oats	Home goalkeepers Sponsors: Mornflake Oats	Away goalkeepers Sponsors: Mornflake Oats

== Competitions ==
=== Overall ===
Competition	Started round	Final position / round	First match	Last match
League Two	—	10th	7 August 2010	7 May 2010
Football League Cup	1st round	2nd round	10 August 2010	24 August 2010
Football League Trophy	1st round (bye)	Area Quarter Final	31 August 2010	
FA Cup	1st round	1st round	6 November 2010	

Updated to match played 21 May 2011
Source: Competitions

=== League Two ===
==== Table ====
Pos	Team	Pld	W	D	L	GF	GA	GD	Pts
8	Gillingham	46	17	17	12	67	57	+10	68
9	Rotherham United	46	17	15	14	75	60	+15	66
10	Crewe Alexandra	46	18	11	17	87	65	+22	65
11	Port Vale	46	17	14	15	54	49	+5	65
12	Oxford United	46	17	12	17	58	60	−2	63

Updated to match(es) played on 28 May 2011. Source: The Football League
Rules for classification: 1) points; 2) goal difference; 3) number of goals scored.

==== Results summary ====
Overall								Home						Away					
Pld	W	D	L	GF	GA	GD	Pts	W	D	L	GF	GA	GD	W	D	L	GF	GA	GD
46	18	11	17	87	65	+22	65	13	6	4	49	18	+31	5	5	13	38	47	−9

Last updated: 21 May 2011.

==== Results by round ====
Round	1	2	3	4	5	6	7	8	9	10	11	12	13	14	15	16	17	18	19	20	21	22	23	24	25	26	27	28	29	30	31	32	33	34	35	36	37	38	39	40	41	42	43	44	45	46
Ground	H	A	H	A	A	H	A	H	H	A	H	A	H	A	H	A	H	A	A	H	A	H	A	H	A	H	A	A	H	H	A	A	H	A	H	H	A	H	A	H	A	H	H	A	H	A
Result	L	L	W	D	D	W	D	D	D	D	D	W	W	L	L	W	L	W	D	W	W	W	L	W	L	W	L	L	D	L	L	L	W	L	W	W	L	D	L	W	L	D	W	L	W	W
Position	21	23	14	13	15	9	9	8	11	14	15	10	7	9	11	9	11	9	9	9	8	5	5	5	6	3	7	8	9	11	11	12	11	12	10	9	12	12	12	12	13	13	11	13	12	10

Updated to match(es) played on 21 May 2011. Source: Crewe Alexandra
A = Away; H = Home; W = Win; D = Draw; L = Loss

== Matches ==
Won Drawn Lost Postponed

=== Pre-season friendlies ===
12 July 2010	Quorn (England)	0–4	Crewe Alexandra	Quorn
19:30		Report	Leitch-Smith 48' 80'; Cooke 81'; Connerton	Stadium: Sutton Park

12 July 2010	Kidsgrove Athletic (England)	2–3	Crewe Alexandra	Kidsgrove
19:30	Walker; Shotton	Report	Zola (2 × pens)	Stadium: The Seddon Stadium; Attendance: 289

16 July 2010	Lancaster City (England)	1–8	Crewe Alexandra	Giant Axe
19:30	Farrell 22'	Report	Miller 15'; Donaldson 17'; Dugdale 33'; Tootle 34'; Donadlson 41'; Short 47'; Shelley; McCarthy 71'

20 July 2010	Crewe Alexandra	1–0	(England) West Bromwich Albion	Alexandra Stadium
19:30	Murphy 59'	Report

24 July 2010	Nantwich Town (England)	0–5	Crewe Alexandra	Nantwich
15:00		Report	McCarthy 40'; Mellor 42'; Mellor 45'; Leitch-Smith 70'; Leitch-Smith 84'	Stadium: The Weaver Stadium; Attendance: 1,092; Referee: Danny Gratton

27 July 2010	Crewe Alexandra	1–0	(England) Blackpool	Alexandra Stadium
19:30	Miller 34'	Report

31 July 2010	Crewe Alexandra	2–0	(Wales) Wrexham	Alexandra Stadium
15:00	Zola 13'; Miller 18'; Artell (yellow card) 74' (unsporting behaviour)	Report	Harris (yellow card) 57' (unsporting behaviour)	Attendance: 1,532; Referee: Dean Mohareb

2 August 2010	Kidderminster Harriers (England)	4–0	Crewe Alexandra	Aggborough
19:45	Wright 11'; Bird 16'; Finnigan 28' (pen.); Shaw 68'	Report

Last updated: 2 August 2010

=== League Two ===
7 August 2010	Crewe Alexandra	0–1	Hereford United	Alexandra Stadium
15:00		Report	Kovacs 16'; Valentine (yellow card) 25' (unsporting behaviour); Thompson (yellow card) 71' (unsporting behaviour); Fleetwood (yellow card) 90' (unsporting behaviour); McQuilkin (yellow card) 90+3' (unsporting behaviour)	Attendance: 4,343; Referee: Brendan Malone; Assistant referees: Paul Marsden & Andrew Scregg; Fourth official: Peter Gooch

14 August 2010	Cheltenham Town	3–2	Crewe Alexandra	Whaddon Road
15:00	Thomas 22'; Thomas (yellow card) 37' (unsporting behaviour); Thomas 42'; Goulding 62'	Report	Ada 4'; Zola 49'; Zola (yellow card) 53' (unsporting behaviour)	Attendance: 3,537; Referee: Iain Williamson

21 August 2010	Crewe Alexandra	7–0	Barnet	Alexandra Stadium
15:00	Miller 4'; Donaldson 34'; Grant 47'; Artell 57'; Donaldson 59'; Miller 77'; Leitch-Smith 82'	Report	Marshall (yellow card) 44' (unsporting behaviour); Parkes (yellow card) 53' (unsporting behaviour)	Attendance: 3,171; Referee: Bobby Madley; Assistant referees: Kevin Mattocks and Marc Perry; Fourth official: Andy Hendley

28 August 2010	Lincoln City	1–1	Crewe Alexandra	Sincil Bank
15:00	Jarrett 40'	Report	Miller 23'	Attendance: 3,024; Referee: David Foster; Assistant referees: Ryan Newman and Wayne Porter; Fourth official: Amy Fearn

4 September 2010	Stevenage	1–1	Crewe Alexandra	Broadhall Way
15:00	Sinclair (yellow card) 31' (unsporting behaviour); Odubade 45+1'; Long (yellow card) 48' (unsporting behaviour); Long (yellow card) 63' (red card) (second bookable offence); Henry (yellow card) 80' (unsporting behaviour); Bostwick (yellow card) 90+2' (unsporting behaviour)	Report	AR Westwood 56'; Miller (yellow card) 65' (unsporting behaviour); AR Westwood (yellow card) 90' (unsporting behaviour)	Attendance: 3,431; Referee: James Linington

11 September 2010	Crewe Alexandra	3–0	Bury	Alexandra Stadium
15:00	Miller 3'; Artell 18'; Murphy 71'; Donaldson missed pen (saved), 74'	Report	Schumacher (yellow card) 31' (unsporting behaviour); Picken (yellow card) 35' (unsporting behaviour); Schumacher (yellow card) 63' (red card) (second bookable offence)	Attendance: 4,030; Referee: Jock Waugh

18 September 2010	Burton Albion	1–1	Crewe Alexandra	Pirelli Stadium
15:00	Austin (yellow card) 39' (unsporting behaviour); Maghoma 44'; Penn (yellow card) 60' (unsporting behaviour); McGrath (yellow card) 80' (unsporting behaviour)	Report	Murphy 63'; Tootle (yellow card) 69' (unsporting behaviour); Bell (yellow card) 87' (unsporting behaviour)	Attendance: 3,093; Referee: Mark Brown; Assistant referees: Wayne Barratt and Paul Hobday; Fourth official: Jason Knowles

25 September 2010	Crewe Alexandra	1–1	Oxford United	Alexandra Stadium
15:00	Artell 38'; Artell (yellow card) 83' (unsporting behaviour)	Report	Tonkin (yellow card) 34' (unsporting behaviour); Constable 71'; Constable (yellow card) 82' (unsporting behaviour); Craddock (yellow card) 84' (unsporting behaviour); Creighton (yellow card) 85' (unsporting behaviour); Constable (yellow card) 89' (red card) (second bookable offence)	Attendance: 4,584; Referee: Geoff Eltringham

28 September 2010	Crewe Alexandra	1–1	Macclesfield Town	Alexandra Stadium
19:45	Leitch-Smith 87'; Leitch-Smith (yellow card) 88'	Report	Bencherif (yellow card) 39' (unsporting behaviour); Barnett 52'; Draper (yellow card) 65' (unsporting behaviour)	Attendance: 3,659; Referee: Graham Salisbury

2 October 2010	Chesterfield	5–5	Crewe Alexandra	B2net Stadium
15:00	Lester 23'; Lester 74'; Whitaker 79'; Hunt (yellow card) 86' (unsporting behaviour); Whitaker 89'; Clay 90+2'	Report	Murphy 4'; Bell 6'; Moore 13'; Miller 26'; Miller (yellow card) 74' (unsporting behaviour); Donaldson 80'; Tootle (yellow card) 88' (unsporting behaviour)	Attendance: 6,047; Referee: Jon Moss

9 October 2010	Crewe Alexandra	3–3	Torquay United	Alexandra Stadium
15:00	Bell missed pen (hit bar), 44'; Donaldson 45+2'; Bell (yellow card) 66' (unsporting behaviour); AR Westwood 73'; AR Westwood 78' (pen.)	Report	Ellis 8'; Ellis 16'; O'Kane (yellow card) 63' (unsporting behaviour); O'Kane 67'; Branston (yellow card) 77' (unsporting behaviour)	Attendance: 4,445; Referee: Russell Booth; Assistant referees: Michael Denton and Simeon Lucas; Fourth official: Mark Heywood

16 October 2010	Southend United	0–2	Crewe Alexandra	Roots Hall
15:00	Prosser (yellow card) 44' (unsporting behaviour)	Report	Bell (yellow card) 34' (unsporting behaviour); Donaldson 55'; Miller 77'	Attendance: 5,506; Referee: Andy Woolmer; Assistant referees: Darren Blunden and Neil Hair; Fourth official: John Hopkins

23 October 2010	Crewe Alexandra	3–1	Aldershot Town	Alexandra Stadium
15:00	Moore 43'; Grant 44'; AR Westwood 58'; Taylor (yellow card) 90+4'	Report	Straker 52'; McGlashan (yellow card) 83' (unsporting behaviour)	Attendance: 4,164; Referee: Andy Haines

30 October 2010	Port Vale	2–1	Crewe Alexandra	Vale Park
15:00	Griffith (yellow card) 2' (unsporting behaviour); Dodds 13'; Roberts (yellow card) 64' (unsporting behaviour); M Richards 74' (pen.); Fraser (yellow card) 80' (unsporting behaviour); Griffith (yellow card) 81' (red card) (second bookable offence); Tomlinson (yellow card) 90+4' (delaying restart)	Report	Taylor (yellow card) 73' (unsporting behaviour); Donaldson 81' (pen.)	Attendance: 8,607; Referee: Anthony Taylor

2 November 2010	Crewe Alexandra	1–2	Shrewsbury Town	Alexandra Stadium
19:45	Miller 49'	Report	Wright 5'; Holden (yellow card) 21' (unsporting behaviour); Neal (yellow card) 79' (unsporting behaviour); Wright 90+3'	Attendance: 4,594; Referee: Karl Evans

13 November 2010	Gillingham	1–3	Crewe Alexandra	KRBS Priestfield Stadium
15:00	Julian (yellow card) 14' (unsporting behaviour); Davies (red card) 28' (professional foul); Whelpdale 47'; Lee (yellow card) 88' (unsporting behaviour)	Report	Moore 36'; Donaldson 45+2'; Miller 77'	Attendance: 5,292; Referee: David Phillips

20 November 2010	Crewe Alexandra	0–1	Rotherham United	Alexandra Stadium
15:00	Ada (yellow card) 57' (unsporting behaviour)	Report	Dugdale 2' (o.g.); Newey (yellow card) 18' (unsporting behaviour); Le Fondre (yellow card) 53' (unsporting behaviour)	Attendance: 4,301; Referee: Neil Swarbrick

27 November 2010	Morecambe	1–2	Crewe Alexandra	Globe Arena
15:00	Charnock (yellow card) 40'; Shuker 89'	Report	Donaldson 4'; Tootle (yellow card) 29' (unsporting behaviour); Moore 45'; Bell (yellow card) 86' (unsporting behaviour)	Attendance: 1,793; Referee: Darren Drysdale

4 December 2010	Crewe Alexandra	P – P	Wycombe Wanderers	Alexandra Stadium
15:00		Postponed due to frozen pitch Source

11 December 2010	Stockport County	3–3	Crewe Alexandra	Edgeley Park
15:00	Tansey 24'; Turnbull (yellow card) 36' (unsporting behaviour); Poole 54'; Tansey 72' (pen.); Donnelly (yellow card) 90' (unsporting behaviour)	Report	Donaldson 45+1'; Donaldson 47'; Shelley 64'	Attendance: 4,036; Referee: Stuart Attwell

18 December 2010	Crewe Alexandra	P – P	Bradford City	Alexandra Stadium
15:00		Postponed due to frozen pitch Source		Referee: Kevin Wright

26 December 2010	Accrington Stanley	P – P	Crewe Alexandra	Crown Ground
15:00		Postponed due to frozen pitch Source

28 December 2010	Crewe Alexandra	P – P	Southend United	Alexandra Stadium
15:00		Postponed due to frozen pitch Source

1 January 2011	Crewe Alexandra	2–0	Northampton Town	Alexandra Stadium
15:00	Donaldson 43'; Miller 59'	Report	Wedderburn (yellow card) 44' (unsporting behaviour); Osman (yellow card) 88' (unsporting behaviour); Johnson (yellow card) 90+2' (unsporting behaviour)	Attendance: 3,835; Referee: Pawson

3 January 2011	Shrewsbury Town	0–1	Crewe Alexandra	New Meadow
15:00		Report	Miller 67'; Miller (yellow card) 70' (unsporting behaviour)	Attendance: 6,561; Referee: Graham Horwood

8 January 2011	Crewe Alexandra	3–0	Wycombe Wanderers	Alexandra Stadium
15:00	Donaldson 71'; Donaldson 72'; Miller 86'	Report	Johnson (yellow card) 87' (unsporting behaviour)	Attendance: 3,727; Referee: Simon Hooper

11 January 2011	Torquay United	2–1	Crewe Alexandra	Plainmoor
19:45	O'Kane 7'; Zebroski 16'; Ellis (yellow card) 58' (unsporting behaviour)	Report	Ada (yellow card) 33' (unsporting behaviour); Miller (yellow card) 53' (unsporting behaviour); Shelley 59'	Attendance: 1,955; Referee: James Linington; Assistant referees: Brett Huxtable and Adam Nunn; Fourth official: Andy Davies

15 January 2011	Crewe Alexandra	2–1	Port Vale	Alexandra Stadium
15:00	Miller 18'; Taylor (yellow card) 58' (unsporting behaviour); Miller 81'	Report	Richards 58' (pen.); Roberts (yellow card) 61' (unsporting behaviour); Haldane (yellow card) 87' (unsporting behaviour)	Attendance: 7,183; Referee: Steve Tanner; Assistant referees: Tony Peart and Colin Harwood; Fourth official: Sasa Ihringova

22 January 2011	Aldershot Town	3–2	Crewe Alexandra	The Recreation Ground
15:00	Small 24'; Harding (yellow card) 57' (unsporting behaviour); Vincenti 63'; Herd (yellow card) 86' (unsporting behaviour); Guttridge 90+4'	Report	Shelley 19'; Donaldson 43'; Dugdale (yellow card) 73' (unsporting behaviour); Taylor (red card) 90+2' (deliberate handball)	Attendance: 2,613; Referee: Keith Stroud; Assistant referees: William Bull and Paul Kelly; Fourth official: Charles Breakspear

25 January 2011	Crewe Alexandra	2–1	Bradford City	Alexandra Stadium
19:45	Donaldson 15'; Moore 40'; Donaldson (red card) 45+1' (violent conduct); AR Westwood (yellow card) 80' (unsporting behaviour); Bell (yellow card) 90+2' (dissent)	Report	Duff 39'; Evans (yellow card) 44' (unsporting behaviour); Worthington (yellow card) 45+4' (unsporting behaviour); O'Brien (yellow card) 45+5' (unsporting behaviour)	Attendance: 3,665; Referee: Kevin Wright; Assistant referees: Paul Hobday; Fourth official: Stephen Martin

29 January 2010	Crewe Alexandra	P – P	Accrington Stanley	Alexandra Stadium
15:00		Postponed due to frozen pitch Source

1 February 2011	Northampton Town	6–2	Crewe Alexandra	Sixfields Stadium
19:45	Harrad 11'; Jacobs 14'; Beckwith 44'; Holt 46'; Osman 48'; McKay 80'	Report	Leitch-Smith 5'; AR Westwood missed pen (saved), 44'; Sarcevic 88'	Attendance: 4,021; Referee: Bobby Madley; Assistant referees: Mike Blackledge and Andy Hendley; Fourth official: Chris Knowles

5 February 2011	Rotherham United	3–1	Crewe Alexandra	Don Valley Stadium
15:00	Fenton 43'; Le Fondre 84'; Taylor 89'	Report	Leitch-Smith 62'	Attendance: 3,750; Referee: David Foster; Assistant referees: Simon Clayton and Ross Joyce; Fourth official: Ryan Johnson

12 February 2011	Crewe Alexandra	1–1	Gillingham	Alexandra Stadium
15:00	Sinclair 26' (o.g.); Artell (yellow card) 90+2' (unsporting behaviour)	Report	Richards (yellow card) 28' (unsporting behaviour); McDonald (yellow card) 54' (unsporting behaviour); Weston 54'; Fuller (yellow card) 58' (unsporting behaviour)	Attendance: 4,012; Referee: Karl Evans

19 February 2011	Crewe Alexandra	0–1	Stevenage	Alexandra Stadium
15:00		Report	Foster (yellow card) 44' (unsporting behaviour); Laird 87'	Attendance: 3,793; Referee: Steve Rushton

22 February 2011	Accrington Stanley	3–2	Crewe Alexandra	Crown Ground
19:45	Barnett 12'; Craney 47'; McConville 75'	Report	Moore 8'; Ada (yellow card) 60'; Artell 72'	Attendance: 1,356; Referee: Paul Tierney; Assistant referees: Gordon Johnson and Paul Kettlewell; Fourth official: Kevin Mattocks

26 February 2011	Bury	3–1	Crewe Alexandra	Gigg Lane
15:00	Bennett 64'; Bennett 68'; Lowe 76'; Sodje (yellow card) 88' (unsporting behaviour)	Report	Miller 41'	Attendance: 3,308; Referee: Mark Haywood; Assistant referees: Tony Harrington and Dave McCallum; Fourth official: Scott Oldham

5 March 2011	Crewe Alexandra	4–1	Burton Albion	Alexandra Stadium
15:00	Donaldson 2'; Miller 7'; Donaldson 27' (pen.); Donaldson 90+2'	Report	Austin (yellow card) 26' (unsporting behaviour); Whaley (yellow card) 44' (unsporting behaviour); McGrath (yellow card) 53' (unsporting behaviour); Boertien (yellow card) 82' (unsporting behaviour); Winnall 83'; Stanton (yellow card) 90+4' (unsporting behaviour)	Attendance: 3,882; Referee: Colin Webster; Assistant referees: Gary Hilton and Nigel Smith; Fourth official: Mark Astley

8 March 2011	Macclesfield Town	1–0	Crewe Alexandra	Moss Rose
19:45	Draper 41'; Brown (yellow card) 75' (unsporting behaviour)	Report		Attendance: 1,485; Referee: Scott Mathieson

12 March 2011	Crewe Alexandra	2–0	Chesterfield	Alexandra Stadium
15:00	Donaldson 36'; Dugdale (yellow card) 70' (unsporting behaviour); Artell (yellow card) 84' (unsporting behaviour); Shelley 87'	Report	Djilali (yellow card) 34' (unsporting behaviour); Holden (yellow card) 83' (unsporting behaviour)	Attendance: 4,503; Referee: Gavin Ward

15 March 2011	Crewe Alexandra	1–0	Southend United	Alexandra Stadium
19:45	Miller 65'; Miller (yellow card) 74' (unsporting behaviour)	Report		Attendance: 3,319; Referee: Geoff Eltringham; Assistant referees: Alan Parker and Nigel Smith; Fourth official: Steven Copeland

19 March 2011	Oxford United	2–1	Crewe Alexandra	Kassam Stadium
15:00	Constable 29'; Wright (yellow card) 42' (unsporting behaviour); MacLean (yellow card) 42' (unsporting behaviour); Constable 67'; Tonkin (yellow card) 74' (delaying restart); Worley (yellow card) 86'	Report	Ada (yellow card) 73' (unsporting behaviour); Dugdale (yellow card) 81' (unsporting behaviour); Leitch-Smith 90+4'	Attendance: 6,751; Referee: Carl Boyeson; Assistant referees: Adam Crysell and David Rock; Fourth official: Guy Stretton

22 March 2011	Crewe Alexandra	0–0	Accrington Stanley	Alexandra Stadium
19:45		Report	Joyce (yellow card) 68' (unsporting behaviour); Hessey (yellow card) 72' (unsporting behaviour)	Attendance: 3,701; Referee: David Coote; Assistant referees: Andrew Hutchinson and David Plowright; Fourth official: Mark Weaver

27 March 2011	Hereford United	1–0	Crewe Alexandra	Edgar Street
15:00	Fleetwood 23'; Lunt (yellow card) 63' (unsporting behaviour)	Report	AR Westwood (yellow card) 67' (unsporting behaviour)	Attendance: 2,334; Referee: Gary Sutton; Assistant referees: Sasa Ihringova and Marc Perry; Fourth official: James Adcock

2 April 2011	Crewe Alexandra	8–1	Cheltenham Town	Alexandra Stadium
15:00	Donaldson 4'; Miller 11'; Donaldson 33'; Grant 37'; AR Westwood 58'; Artell (yellow card) 60' (unsporting behaviour); Donaldson 67' (pen.); Grant 73'; Grant 88' (pen.)	report	Thomas 50'; Thomas (yellow card) 53' (unsporting behaviour)	Attendance: 3,682; Referee: Peter Quinn; Assistant referees: Matthew Bristow and Paul Hodskinson; Fourth official: Lee Metcalfe

9 April 2011	Barnet	2–1	Crewe Alexandra	Underhill Stadium
15:00	Leach 11'; Deering (yellow card) 24' (unsporting behaviour); McLeod 26'; Walker (yellow card) 87' (delaying restart); Walker (yellow card) 90' (yellow-red card) (second bookable offence)	Report	Donaldson 45+3' (pen.)	Attendance: 2,212; Referee: Mark Brown; Assistant referees: Stephen Artis and Chris Powell; Fourth official: John Busby

16 April 2011	Crewe Alexandra	1–1	Lincoln City	Alexandra Stadium
15:00	Donaldson 77' (pen.)	Report	Green 47'; Kilbey (yellow card) 68' (unsporting behaviour); Hone (yellow card) 76' (unsporting behaviour); Green (yellow card) 78' (unsporting behaviour)	Attendance: 3,731; Referee: Pat Miller; Assistant referees: Peter Bankes and Gary Stott; Fourth official: Guy Stretton

22 April 2011	Crewe Alexandra	2–1	Morecambe	Alexandra Stadium
15:00	Donaldson 72'; Dugdale (yellow card) 78' (unsporting behaviour); Donaldson 90+3'	Report	Hunter 58'	Attendance: 3,614; Referee: Chris Sarginson; Assistant referees: Marvyn Amphlett and Paul Graham; Fourth official: Alan Parker

25 April 2011	Wycombe Wanderers	2–0	Crewe Alexandra	Adams Park
15:00	Rendell 42'; Rendell 45+2' (pen.); Bloomfield (yellow card) 88' (unsporting behaviour)	Report	Blanchett (yellow card) 34' (unsporting behaviour); AM Westwood (yellow card) 41' (unsporting behaviour); Donaldson missed pen (saved), 45'	Attendance: 4,615; Referee: Danny McDermid; Assistant referees: Richard Corp and John Hopkins; Fourth official: Mark Pottage

30 April 2011	Crewe Alexandra	2–0	Stockport County	Alexandra Stadium
15:00	Goodall 62' (o.g.); Donaldson 65'; Miller (yellow card) 89' (unsporting behaviour)	Report	Darkwah (yellow card) 89' (unsporting behaviour)	Attendance: 4,799; Referee: Tony Bates; Assistant referees: Philip Dermott and Gary Hilton; Fourth official: Michael Denton

7 May 2011	Bradford City	1–5	Crewe Alexandra	Valley Parade
15:00	Speight 23' (pen.); Speight (yellow card) 74' (unsporting behaviour)	Report	Miller 12'; Miller 32'; Donaldson 34'; Shelley 45'; Shelley 67'	Attendance: 11,030; Referee: Graham Salisbury

=== Football League Cup ===
10 August 2010 First round	Crewe Alexandra	1–0	Derby County (FLC)	Alexandra Stadium
19:45	Barker 45+1' (o.g.); Tootle (yellow card) 74' (unsporting behaviour)	Report	Moxey (yellow card) 61' (unsporting behaviour)	Attendance: 3,778; Referee: Carl Boyeson; Assistant referees: Mark Astley and Peter Bankes; Fourth official: Danny Gratton

24 August 2010 Second round	Crewe Alexandra	0 – 1 aet	Ipswich Town (FLC)	Alexandra Stadium
19:45	Murphy (yellow card) 116' (unsporting behaviour); Donaldson (yellow card) 117' (unsporting behaviour)	Report	Leadbitter (yellow card) 26' (unsporting behaviour); Norris (yellow card) 65' (unsporting behaviour); Smith (yellow card) 70' (unsporting behaviour); O'Connor (yellow card) 78' (unsporting behaviour); Norris 101'	Attendance: 3,309; Referee: Paul Tierney; Assistant referees: Robert Jones and Scott Oldham; Fourth official: Mark Weaver

Last updated: 4 September 2010

=== Football League Trophy ===
First round	Bye
	Source

5 October 2010 Second round	Macclesfield Town (FL2)	2–4	Crewe Alexandra	Moss Rose
19:30	Ada 13' (o.g.); Ada 30' (o.g.)	Report	Daniel 4' (o.g.); Bell 29' (pen.); Artell 48'; Grant 59'	Attendance: 1,103; Referee: Rob Lewis; Assistant referees: Geoff Law and Lee Metcalfe; Fourth official: Gary Hilton

9 November 2010 Area Quarter Final	Carlisle United (FL1)	3–1	Crewe Alexandra	Brunton Park
19:45	Donaldson 14' (o.g.); Murphy 72'; Taiwo (yellow card) 81' (unsporting behaviour); Murphy 85'	Source	Dugdale (yellow card) 64' (unsporting behaviour); Donaldson 76'	Attendance: 2,142; Referee: Miller

=== FA Cup ===
6 November 2010 First round	Tamworth	2–1	Crewe Alexandra	The Lamb Ground
15:00	Rodman 15'; Tait (yellow card) 40' (unsporting behaviour); Thomas 55'; Barrow (yellow card) 78' (unsporting behaviour); Wylde (yellow card) 90' (unsporting behaviour)	Report	Moore (yellow card) 36' (unsporting behaviour); AR Westwood 88'; Donaldson (yellow card) 90' (unsporting behaviour)	Attendance: 1,776; Referee: Graham Scott
