= 2009–10 Crewe Alexandra F.C. season =

Crewe Alexandra
2009–2010 season
- Chairman: John Bowler
- Manager: Guðjón Þórðarson; Dario Gradi
- Stadium: Gresty Road
- League Two: 18th
- FA Cup: First round
- League Cup: First round
- Football League Trophy: First round
- Top goalscorer: League: Calvin Zola (15); All: Calvin Zola (18)
- Highest home attendance: 6,943 (vs Port Vale, 17 October 2009)
- Lowest home attendance: 2,331 (vs Stockport County, 1 September 2009)

This article details Crewe Alexandra's 2009–10 season in League Two, their 86th competitive season in the English Football League.

== Events ==
This is a list of the significant events to occur at the club before and during the 2009–10 season, presented in chronological order.

=== 2009 ===
==== Pre-season ====
- 2 May: Crewe are relegated to League Two after a 3–0 loss at home to League One champions Leicester City.
- 7 May: Manager Gudjon Thordarson releases 10 players from the squad, including captain Julien Baudet to the MLS, leading to 19 players being left from the previous season.
- 19 May: Pre-season games are announced against three Premier League sides, Wigan Athletic, a Wolverhampton Wanderers select XI and Birmingham City.
- 21 May: Crewe announce their first signing of the summer, with central defender Patrick Ada signing from Histon, while assistant manager, Neil Baker, leaves his position.
- 4 June: Chief scout Glyn Chamberlain leaves the club after four years. and Crewe make their first sale for money after Tom Pope agrees a £150,000 move to Rotherham United.
- 17 June: The same day the fixtures are released, Crewe announce that Nantwich Town manager Steve Davis has been appointed new assistant manager.
- 5 July: Prior to a 7–0 win over Newcastle Town in a friendly, Billy Jones is made the forthcoming season's captain, with Anthony Elding as vice-captain.

==== 2009–10 season begins- August ====
- 8 August: Crewe start off their season with a 2–1 defeat at home by Dagenham & Redbridge.
- 11 August: Crewe's League Cup campaign ends in the first round after a 2–1 defeat at home to Championship side Blackpool.
- 15 August: Crewe get their two away wins of the season after a 0–4 win over Grimsby Town, then a narrow 0–1 win over Darlington three days later.
- 20 August: Tottenham Hotspur recall on-loan 'keeper David Button.
- 22 August: Crewe get their first win at home, and a third straight clean sheet with a 1–0 win over Hereford United after Billy Jones scored the rebound from his saved penalty kick.
- 29 August: Crewe fail to score for the first time this season, and suffer their first away loss after losing at Bournemouth 1–0.

==== September ====
- 1 September: Crewe lose in the Football League Trophy to Stockport County, the first Cheshire derby of the season. and re-sign David Button on loan until 3 January.
- 5 September: Crewe's second Cheshire derby of the season ends with a Crewe win, 2–1 against Macclesfield Town at home, to send Crewe up to fifth in the table.
- 12 September: Crewe travel 30 miles to Shrewsbury Town, where their inconsistent season continues with a 2–0 loss.
- 19 September: Crewe's 23 shots against Aldershot Town's six do not help as they lose 2–1.
- 25 September: Crewe honour Accrington Stanley's request to play on a Friday night to help with Accrington's debt, but end up losing 5–3.
- 29 September: Crewe have two men sent off in a match for the first time since 1996, in a 3–2 loss at home to Bury, with former Crewe striker Ryan Lowe scoring for the visitors.

==== October ====
- 2 October: Crewe part company with Gudjon Thordarson with immediate effect after a board meeting, with Dario Gradi again taking the position as caretaker manager.
- 9 October: Bolton Wanderers recall on loan goalkeeper Ádám Bogdán.
- 24 October: After Crewe lose away at Notts County, striker Anthony Elding is placed on the transfer list.
- 27 October: Tottenham Hotspur recall on loan 'keeper David Button again.

==== November ====
- 7 November: Crewe lose in the First round of the FA Cup to Blue Square Premier side York City.
- 21 November: Following Crewe's 2–2 draw away at Northampton Town, Crewe become the last Football League side to draw a game in the new season.

==== December ====
- 2 December: Steve Phillips saves two penalties as Crewe are the first team to win at Saltergate this season after a 3–2 win at 5th placed Chesterfield.
- 5 December: Crewe draw at home with Lincoln City 0–0, Crewe's first no-score draw of the season, and first since April 2009.
- 12 December: Crewe become the first team to beat Barnet at home after a 1–2 win. Matthew Tootle is later cleared of diving by the FA, but his yellow card is not rescinded.
- 19 December: Crewe's home match with Torquay United is postponed due to a frozen pitch at The Alexandra Stadium.
- 26 December: Crewe come from behind twice to secure a 2–2 draw with top of the table Rochdale, who were looking for a record sixth successive away win.
- 28 December: Crewe's final match of 2009 is a 4–1 loss away at Macclesfield Town. The result means Crewe finish the year in 12th position in the league.
- 29 December: Harry Worley's loan is extended until the end of the season.

=== 2010 ===
==== January ====
- 1 January: Crewe's first two games of the New Year against Hereford and Grimsby are postponed, due to the heavy snow around Britain.
- 5 January: Striker Anthony Elding and the club agree to mutually terminate Eldgin's contract with immediate effect.
- 6 January: Steve Phillips extends his loan until 30 May.

==== February ====
- 23 February: Crewe's match with Chesterfield is put back by 24 hours due to a bad weather forecast.

==== March ====
- 19 March: Crewe sign Lancaster City striker Jordan Connerton for an undisclosed fee on a three-year contract. Crewe loan Connerton back to Lancaster City for the remainder of the season. A-Jay Leitch-Smith also goes out on loan, to Curzon Ashton until the end of the season.

==== April ====
- 26 April: Ashley Westwood is awarded the Player of the Season award at the Crewe ASi Award Night. Westwood also picked up the Newcomer of the Season award, whilst Calvin Zola's goal against Bradford City on 10 October is voted as the Goal of the Season.
- 27 April: Crewe retain the Cheshire Premier Cup after an extra-time win over Macclesfield Town at Gresty Road.

==== May ====
- 1 May: Assistant Manager Steve Davis takes control of the first team's goalless draw at Rotherham United whilst Dario Gradi went on scouting duties.
- 8 May: Crewe's final match of the season is a 1–0 loss at home to Bradford City, leaving Crewe finishing 18th in the league table.

== Players ==
=== Squad information ===
N	Pos.	Nat.	Name	Age	EU	Since	App	Goals	Ends	Transfer fee	Notes
1	GK	(England)	Collis	28	EU	2008	26	0	30 Jun 2010	Free	
2	DF	(England)	Brayford	21	EU	2008	86	3	30 Jun 2010	£210,000	
3	DF	(England)	Jones (captain)	26	EU	2007	85	9	30 Jun 2010	£ 65,000	
4	MF	(England)	Schumacher	25	EU	2007	82	8	30 Jun 2010	Free	
5	DF	(England)	O'Donnell (VC2)	23	EU	2007	147	4	30 Jun 2010	£100,000	
6	DF	(Cameroon)	Ada	24	Non-EU	2009	21	0	30 Jun 2011	Free	
8	FW	(England)	Donaldson	25	EU	2008	82	20	2011	£125,000	
9	FW	(England)	Elding (VC1)	27	EU	2008	32	4	2011	Undisclosed	
10	FW	(Democratic Republic of the Congo)	Zola	24	Non-EU	2008	69	23	2011	£200,000	
11	MF	(Jamaica) (England)	Grant	21	EU	2008	77	13	2011	£130,000	
12	DF	(England)	Mitchel-King	25	EU	2009	35	0	30 Jun 2011	Free	
13	GK	(England)	Legzdins	22	EU	2008	8	0	30 Jun 2010	Free	
14	FW	(England)	Moore	20	EU	2007	110	9	30 Jun 2010	Youth system	
15	FW	(England)	Miller	21	EU	2006	99	19	30 Jun 2011	Youth system	
16	DF	(England)	Bailey	20	EU	2007	55	0	30 Jun 2011	Youth system	
17	DF	(England)	McManus	20	EU	2008	1	0	30 Jun 2010	Free	
18	MF	(England)	Murphy	19	EU	2008	45	4	30 Jun 2011	Youth system	
19	DF	(England)	Westwood	19	EU	2008	40	6	30 Jun 2009	Youth system	
20	DF	(England)	Shelley	19	EU	2008	22	2	30 Jun 2011	Youth system	
21	MF	(England)	Clements	19	EU	2008	1	0	30 Jun 2010	Youth system	
22	FW	(England)	Leitch-Smith	19	EU	2008	1	0	30 Jun 2010	Youth system	
23	DF	(England)	Tootle	18	EU	2009	28	1	30 Jun 2010	Youth system	
26	DF	(England)	Davis	17	EU	2009	1	0		Youth system	
27	DF	(England)	Worley	20	EU	2009	23	0	14 May 2010	Loan	From Leicester City
28	MF	(England)	Walton	21	EU	2009	33	1	30 Jun 2010	Loan	From Plymouth Argyle
30	DF	(England)	Martin	22	EU	2009	5	1		£5,000	
31	GK	(England)	Phillips	31	EU	2009	29	0	3 Jan 2010	Loan	From Bristol Rovers
35	DF	(England)	Stokes	18	EU	2009	2	0	11 Apr 2010	Loan	From Bolton Wanderers

- Last updated: 11 May 2010
- Source: Wikipedia players' articles, Crewe Alexandra, crewe-mad, soccerbase
- Ordered by Squad Number.

Appearances (starts and substitute appearances) and goals include those in the League (and playoffs), FA Cup, League Cup and Football League Trophy.

=== Squad stats ===
				Total			League Two		FA Cup		Football League Cup		Football League Trophy		Notes
No.	Pos.	Nat.	Name	Sts	App	Gls	App	Gls	App	Gls	App	Gls	App	Gls	Notes
1	GK	(England)	Collis	1	1		1								
2	DF	(England)	Brayford	47	47		44		1		1		1		
3	DF	(England)	Jones	13	14	2	12	2			1		1		
4	MF	(England)	Schumacher	28	33	4	32	4					1		
5	DF	(England)	O'Donnell	27	27		27								
6	DF	(Cameroon)	Ada	19	21		18		1		1		1		
8	FW	(England)	Donaldson	28	39	12	37	12	1		1				
9	FW	(England)	Elding	4	12		10				1		1		
10	FW	(Democratic Republic of the Congo)	Zola	33	37	17	34	15	1		1	1	1	1	
11	MF	(Jamaica) (England)	Grant	44	46	9	43	9	1		1		1		
12	DF	(England)	Mitchel-King	34	35		32		1		1		1		
13	GK	(England)	Legzdins	8	8		6				1		1		
14	FW	(England)	Moore	16	32	3	29	3	1		1		1		
15	FW	(England)	Miller	22	34	7	33	7					1		
16	MF	(England)	Bailey	22	23		21		1		1				
17	DF	(England)	McManus												
18	MF	(England)	Murphy	23	34	5	32	5	1		1				
19	MF	(England)	Westwood	35	37	6	36	6			1				
20	MF	(England)	Shelley	8	17	1	16	1	1						
21	MF	(England)	Clements		1				1						
22	FW	(England)	Leitch-Smith		1		1								
23	DF	(England)	Tootle	26	28	1	28	1							
24	GK	(England)	Button	10	10		10								On loan from 22 July 09 to 3 Jan 10 (recalled on 20 Aug 09); Back on loan from 1 Sep 09 to 3 Jan 10 (recalled on 27 Oct 09)
25	MF	(England)	Verma	6	9		7				1		1		On loan from 10 Aug 09 to 10 Nov 09
26	DF	(England)	Davis		1		1								
27	DF	(England)	Worley	22	24	1	23	1					1		On loan from 14 Aug 09 to 14 Jan 10
28	MF	(England)	Walton	27	33	1	31	1	1				1		On loan from 31 Aug 09 to 30 Jun 10
29	GK	(Hungary)	Bogdán	1	1		1								On loan from 29 Sep 09 to 26 Oct 09 (recalled on 9 Oct 09)
30	DF	(England)	Martin	1	5	1	5	1							
31	GK	(England)	Phillips	29	29		28		1						On loan from 2 Nov 09 to 3 Jan 10
35	DF	(England)	Stokes	2	2		2								On loan from 12 Mar 10 to 11 Apr 10

Last updated: 11 May 2010
Source: Crewe Alexandra
Ordered by Squad Numbers
0 shown as blank

==== Disciplinary record ====
N	Pos.	Nat.	Name	Yellow card	Second yellow card	Red card	Notes
19	MF	(England)	Westwood	4	0	1	
6	DF	(Cameroon)	Ada	2	0	1	
3	DF	(England)	Jones	2	0	1	
2p	DF	(England)	Martin	0	0	1	
15	FW	(England)	Miller	6	0	0	
28	MF	(England)	Walton	5	0	0	
4	MF	(England)	Schumacher	3	0	0	
12	DF	(England)	Mitchel-King	2	0	0	Conceded two penalties
27	DF	(England)	Worley	2	0	0	Conceded one penalty
10	FW	(Democratic Republic of the Congo)	Zola	2	0	0	
8	FW	(England)	Donaldson	2	0	0	
25	MF	(England)	Verma	1	0	0	
18	MF	(England)	Murphy	1	0	0	
16	DF	(England)	Bailey	1	0	0	
23	DF	(England)	Tootle	1	0	0	

Last updated: 11 May 2010
Source: Crewe Alexandra
Only competitive matches
(yellow card) = Number of bookings; (second yellow card) = Number of sending offs after a second yellow card; (red card) = Number of sending offs by a direct red card.

==== Awards ====
===== Individual =====
Date	N	P	Nat.	Name	Award	Notes
17 Aug 2009	10	FW	(Democratic Republic of the Congo)	Zola	League Two Team of the Week	Source
24 Aug 2009	13	GK	(England)	Legzdins	League Two Team of the Week	Source
12 Oct 2009	10	FW	(Democratic Republic of the Congo)	Zola	League Two Team of the Week	Source
October 2009	10	FW	(Democratic Republic of the Congo)	Zola	PFA Player-of-the-Month	Source
2 Nov 2009	20	DF	(England)	Shelley	League Two Team of the Week	Source
2 Nov 2009	4	MF	(England)	Schumacher	League Two Team of the Week	Source
2 Nov 2009	10	FW	(Democratic Republic of the Congo)	Zola	League Two Team of the Week	Source
7 Dec 2009	23	DF	(England)	Tootle	League Two Team of the Week	Source
12 Dec 2009	11	MF	(Jamaica)	Grant	League Two Team of the Week	Source
25 Jan 2010	11	MF	(Jamaica)	Grant	League Two Team of the Week	Source
22 Feb 2010	19	DF	(England)	Westwood	League Two Team of the Week	Source
8 Mar 2010	8	FW	(England)	Donaldson	League Two Team of the Week	Source
29 Mar 2010	12	DF	(England)	Mitchel-King	League Two Team of the Week	Source
26 Apr 2010	19	DF	(England)	Westwood	League Two Team of the Week	Source
26 Apr 2010	10	FW	(Democratic Republic of the Congo)	Zola	League Two Team of the Week	Source
3 May 2010	13	GK	(England)	Legzdins	League Two Team of the Week	Source

=== Players in and out ===
==== In ====
No.	Pos.	Nat.	Name	Age	EU	Moving from	Type	Transfer window	Ends	Transfer fee	Source
24	GK	(England)	Button	20	EU	Tottenham Hotspur	Loan	Summer	20 Aug 2009	Loan	Crewe Alexandra
24	GK	(England)	Button	20	EU	Tottenham Hotspur	Loan	Summer	27 Oct 2009	Loan	Crewe Alexandra
6	DF	(Cameroon)	Ada	24		Histon	Transfer	Summer	30 Jun 2011	Free	Crewe Alexandra
12	DF	(England)	Mitchel-King	25	EU	Histon	Transfer	Summer	30 Jun 2011	Free	Crewe Alexandra
25	MF	(England)	Verma	22	EU	Leicester City	Loan	Summer	10 Nov 2009	Loan	Crewe Alexandra
27	DF	(England)	Worley	20	EU	Leicester City	Loan	Summer	14 May 2010	Loan	Crewe Alexandra; BBC Sport
28	DF	(England)	Walton	21	EU	Plymouth Argyle	Loan	Summer	30 Jun 2010	Loan	Crewe Alexandra
29	GK	(Hungary)	Bogdán	22	EU	Bolton Wanderers	Loan	Winter	9 Oct 2009	Loan	Crewe Alexandra
31	GK	(England)	Phillips	31	EU	Bristol Rovers	Loan	Winter	3 Jan 2010	Loan	
30	DF	(England)	Martin	22	EU	Wealdstone	Transfer	Winter		£5,000	

==== Out ====
No.	Pos.	Nat.	Name	Age	EU	Moving to	Type	Transfer window	Transfer fee	Source
6	DF	(France)	Baudet	30	EU	Colorado Rapids (United States)	Transferred	Summer	Free	Crewe Alexandra
18	MF	(England)	Carrington	22	EU	Milton Keynes Dons	Released	Summer	Free	Crewe Alexandra
14	DF	(England)	McCready	27	EU	Wrexham (Wales)	Released	Summer	Free	Crewe Alexandra
21	GK	(England)	Tomlinson	24	EU	Barrow	Released	Summer	Free	Crewe Alexandra
		(England)	Danville		EU	Free agent	Released	Summer	Free	Crewe Alexandra
		(England)	Thompson		EU	Free agent	Released	Summer	Free	Crewe Alexandra
2	DF	(England)	Woodards	25	EU	Milton Keynes Dons	Released	Summer	Free	Crewe Alexandra
22	MF	(England)	Daniel	21	EU	Macclesfield Town	Released	Summer	Free	Crewe Alexandra
15	DF	(England)	Abbey	30	EU	Free agent	Mutual Consent	Summer	Free	Crewe Alexandra
7	MF	(Germany)	Bopp	25	EU	Free agent	Mutual Consent	Summer	Free	Crewe Alexandra
19	FW	(England)	Pope	23	EU	Rotherham United	Transferred	Summer	£150,000	Crewe Alexandra
8	MF	(Northern Ireland)	O'Connor	21	EU	Scunthorpe United	Transferred	Summer	£225,000	Crewe Alexandra
	DF	(England)	McManus	20	EU	Curzon Ashton	Loan	Winter	Loan	Crewe Alexandra

Last updated: 10 October 2009
EU = if holds or not a European Union passport; Country: when 2 flags, 1st flag = country that plays for internationally, 2nd flag = country of birth; N = number on jersey; P = Position (for position name, pause mouse pointer on abbreviation); Name = Name on jersey (for more extensive name, pause mouse pointer on name); Age = age on the day of the signing; Moving from = only indicate the club the player was playing before start playing for this club in this season, for the type of the moving see Status column; Moving to = only indicates the club the player is going to play next, for the type of the moving see Status column; Ends = when the player's current contract ends; n/a = Not applicable.

== Club ==
=== Coaching staff ===
Position	Staff
Technical Director and Manager	Dario Gradi MBE
Assistant Manager	Steve Davis
Assistant Academy Manager	James Collins
Assistant Academy Manager	Neil Critchley
Chief Scout	Neil Baker
Senior Physiotherapist	Barry Holmes
Physiotherapist	Steve Walker
Fitness Coach	Andy Franks
Academy Recruitment Officer	Phil Swift
Academy Welfare Officer / Academy Administration	Paul Anthrobus

Last updated: 2 October 2009
Source: Crewe Alexandra Staff

=== Other information ===
Chairman	John Bowler
Vice Chairman	Norman Hassall
Director	Richard Clayton
Director	Dario Gradi MBE
Director	Mark Hassall
Director	Jim McMillan
Director	Daniel Potts
Director	David Rowlinson
Director	Jimmy Rowlinson
Head Groundsman	John Huxley
Assistant Groundsman	Andrew Wareham
Club Doctor	Dr Mike Freeman
Ground (capacity and dimensions)	Alexandra Stadium (10,153 / 100 × 66 yd)

Updated to match played 6 July 2009
Source: Crewe Alexandra Staff

=== Kits ===
Home; Supplier: Lotto; Sponsors: Mornflake Oats	Away; Supplier: Lotto; Sponsors: Mornflake Oats	Home goalkeepers Supplier: Lotto; Sponsors: Mornflake Oats	Away goalkeepers Supplier: Lotto; Sponsors: Mornflake Oats

== Competitions ==
=== Overall ===
Competition	Started round	Current position / round	Final position / round	First match	Last match
League Two	—	—	18th	8 August 2009	8 May 2010
Football League Cup	1st round	1st round	1st round	11 August 2009	
Football League Trophy	1st round	1st round	1st round	1 September 2009	
FA Cup	1st round	1st round	1st round	7 November 2009	

Updated to match played 11 May 2010
Source: Competitions

=== League Two ===
==== Table ====
Pos	Team	Pld	W	D	L	GF	GA	GD	Pts
16	Hereford United	46	17	8	21	54	65	−11	59
17	Torquay United	46	14	15	17	64	55	+9	57
18	Crewe Alexandra	46	15	10	21	68	73	−5	55
19	Macclesfield Town	46	12	18	16	49	58	−9	54
20	Lincoln City	46	13	11	22	42	65	−23	50

Updated to match(es) played on unknown. Source: football-league.co.uk

==== Results summary ====
Overall								Home						Away					
Pld	W	D	L	GF	GA	GD	Pts	W	D	L	GF	GA	GD	W	D	L	GF	GA	GD
46	15	10	21	68	73	−5	55	7	4	12	35	36	−1	8	6	9	33	37	−4

Last updated: 11 May 2010.
Source: http://www.crewealexandra-mad.co.uk/footydb/loadlgt.asp

==== Results by round ====
Round	1	2	3	4	5	6	7	8	9	10	11	12	13	14	15	16	17	18	19	20	21	22	23	24	25	26	27	28	29	30	31	32	33	34	35	36	37	38	39	40	41	42	43	44	45	46
Ground	H	A	A	H	A	H	A	H	A	H	H	A	H	A	A	H	A	H	A	H	A	H	A	A	A	H	H	H	A	A	H	H	A	H	H	A	H	A	A	H	H	A	A	H	A	H
Result	L	W	W	W	L	W	L	L	L	L	L	W	L	L	W	L	D	W	W	D	W	D	L	L	D	W	L	D	L	W	W	L	D	D	W	D	L	W	L	L	L	L	D	W	D	L
Position	16	7	5	3	6	5	6	10	10	14	17	15	16	18	15	18	17	15	14	14	13	12	12	13	13	11	15	15	15	14	14	15	15	15	15	15	15	15	15	15	15	16	18	16	18	18

Updated to match(es) played on 11 May 2010. Source: Crewe Alexandra
A = Away; H = Home; W = Win; D = Draw; L = Loss

== Matches ==
Won Drawn Lost

=== Pre-season friendlies ===
5 July 2009	Newcastle Town	0–7	Crewe Alexandra	Newcastle-under-Lyme
14:30		Report	Elding 11'; Donaldson 21'; Zola 59'; Zola 63'; Elding ( ) Razak^{[Note 1]} 71'; Razak 80'	Stadium: Lyme Valley Stadium

16 July 2009	Crewe Alexandra	1–0	Wigan Athletic	Alexandra Stadium
19:30	Grant 31'	Report		Attendance: 2,063

19 July 2009	Nantwich Town	1–1	Crewe Alexandra	Weaver Stadium
15:00	Carter 8'	Report	Donaldson 14'	Attendance: 1,022

23 July 2009	Hyde United	2–4	Crewe Alexandra	Ewen Fields
19:30	Smith 41'; Gedman 48'	Report	Grant 13'; O'Donnell 19'; Jones 53' (pen.); Grant 69'

25 July 2009	Crewe Alexandra	5–1	Port Vale	Reaseheath
	Murphy; Moore; Stephenson; Lewis; Peel	Report		Stadium: Reaseheath training ground Attendance: 0 (behind closed doors)

29 July 2009	Crewe Alexandra	0–1	Wolverhampton Wanderers XI	Alexandra Stadium
19:30		Report	Malone 37'	Attendance: 1,741

4 August 2009	Crewe Alexandra	4–1	Birmingham City	Alexandra Stadium
19:30	Schumacher 45'; Queudrue 49' (o.g.); Grant 53'; Mitchel-King 65'	Report	McFadden 17'	Attendance: 1,827

1. Razak was a trialist for this game, which ended on 13 July.

Last updated: 5 August 2009

=== League Two ===
8 August 2009 1	Crewe Alexandra	1–2	Dagenham & Redbridge	Alexandra Stadium
15:00	Moore 72'	Report	Nurse 43'; Benson 74'; Doe (yellow card) 73' (unsporting behaviour); Gain (yellow card) 84' (unsporting behaviour)	Attendance: 3,936; Referee: Simon Hooper

15 August 2009 2	Grimsby Town	0–4	Crewe Alexandra	Blundell Park
15:00		Report	Zola 34'; Zola 45'; Jones 47' (pen.); Moore 90+4'; Jones (yellow card) 24' (unsporting behaviour)	Attendance: 5,007; Referee: Mark Haywood

18 August 2009 3	Darlington	0–1	Crewe Alexandra	The Darlington Arena
19:45		Report	Zola 87'	Attendance: 1,821; Referee: Jock Waugh

22 August 2009 4	Crewe Alexandra	1–0	Hereford United	Alexandra Stadium
15:00	Jones missed pen (saved), 37'; Jones 37'	Report	Plummer (yellow card) 21' (unsporting behaviour); C Jones (yellow card) 83' (unsporting behaviour)	Attendance: 3,731; Referee: Karl Evans

29 August 2009 5	Bournemouth	1–0	Crewe Alexandra	Dean Court
15:00	Feeney 51'; Molesley (yellow card) 67' (unsporting behaviour); Pitman (yellow card) 90+2' (unsporting behaviour); Bartley (yellow card) 90+3' (unsporting behaviour)	Report	Jones (yellow card) 59' (dissent); Verma (yellow card) 64' (unsporting behaviour)	Attendance: 4,563; Referee: Roger East

5 September 2009 6	Crewe Alexandra	2–1	Macclesfield Town	Alexandra Stadium
15:00	Zola 12'; Grant 85'; Ada (yellow card) 61' (unsporting behaviour)	Report	Sappleton 32'; Bencherif (yellow card) 52' (dissent); Draper (yellow card) 61' (unsporting behaviour)	Attendance: 4,151; Referee: Steve Bratt

12 September 2009 7	Shrewsbury Town	2–0	Crewe Alexandra	New Meadow
15:00	Hibbert 29'; Labadie 69'; Holden (yellow card) 30' (unsporting behaviour)	Report	Miller (yellow card) 87' (dissent)	Attendance: 6,204; Referee: Steven Cook

19 September 2009 8	Crewe Alexandra	1–2	Aldershot Town	Alexandra Stadium
15:00	Miller 16'; Worley (yellow card) 33' (unsporting behaviour); Walton (yellow card) 82' (unsporting behaviour); Zola (yellow card) 90' (unsporting behaviour)	Report	Donnelly 33'; Hudson 66'; Charles (yellow card) 6' (unsporting behaviour)	Attendance: 3,661; Referee: Andy Hall

25 September 2009 9	Accrington Stanley	5–3	Crewe Alexandra	Crown Ground
19:45	Grant 3'; Symes 5'; Grant 49'; Procter 68'; Symes 77'	Report	Grant 43'; Grant 82'; Murphy 90+3'	Attendance: 2,764; Referee: Dean Whitestone

29 September 2009 10	Crewe Alexandra	2–3	Bury	Alexandra Stadium
19:45	Worley 39'; Zola 73'; Jones (red card) 85' (professional foul); Ada (red card) 90+3' (professional foul); Murphy (yellow card) 90+6' (unsporting behaviour)	Report	Elliott 22'; Lowe 41'; Dawson 86' (pen.); Newey (yellow card) 28' (unsporting behaviour); Baker (yellow card) 36' (unsporting behaviour)	Attendance: 3,534; Referee: David Foster

3 October 2009 11	Crewe Alexandra	2–3	Rotherham United	Alexandra Stadium
15:00	Schumacher 6'; Zola 51'	Report	Ellison 15'; Le Fondre 58' (pen.); Broughton 85'; Fenton (yellow card) 69' (unsporting behaviour); Sharps (yellow card) 76' (unsporting behaviour)	Attendance: 4,253; Referee: Trevor Kettle

10 October 2009 12	Bradford City	2–3	Crewe Alexandra	Valley Parade
15:00	Boulding 44'; Hanson 69'	Report	Zola 8'; Zola 23'; Schumacher 65'; Mitchel-King (yellow card) 45+1' (unsporting behaviour); Westwood (yellow card) 72' (unsporting behaviour); Bailey (yellow card) 75' (unsporting behaviour)	Attendance: 11,757; Referee: Carl Boyeson

17 October 2009 13	Crewe Alexandra	1–2	Port Vale	Alexandra Stadium
15:00	Miller 34'; Miller (yellow card) 62' (unsporting behaviour); Westwood (yellow card) 72' (unsporting behaviour)	Report	Richards 45+1'; Taylor 80'; McCombe (yellow card) 53' (unsporting behaviour); Jarrett (yellow card) 61' (dissent)	Attendance: 6,943; Referee: Nigel Miller

24 October 2009 14	Notts County	2–0	Crewe Alexandra	Meadow Lane
15:00	Rodgers 28'; Westcarr 66'; Lee (yellow card) 21' (unsporting behaviour); Rodgers (yellow card) 32' (unsporting behaviour); Thompson (yellow card) 76' (unsporting behaviour); Akinbiyi (yellow card) 80' (unsporting behaviour)	Report	Schumacher missed pen (saved), 76'	Attendance: 6,545; Referee: James Linington

31 October 2009 15	Cheltenham Town	0–4	Crewe Alexandra	Whaddon Road
15:00	Eyjólfsson (yellow card) 28' (unsporting behaviour); Hayles (yellow card) 90+2' (unsporting behaviour)	Report	Zola 29'; Schumacher 37'; Shelley 69'; Zola 73'	Attendance: 3,124; Referee: Graham Scott

14 November 2009 16	Crewe Alexandra	1–2	Morecambe	Alexandra Stadium
15:00	Schumacher 77'	Report	Bentley 7'; Jevons 37'; Hunter (yellow card) 85' (unsporting behaviour)	Attendance: 4,113; Referee: Geoff Eltringham

21 November 2009 17	Northampton Town	2–2	Crewe Alexandra	Sixfields Stadium
15:00	Akinfenwa 51'; Akinfenwa 62'	Report	Donaldson 14'; Johnson 43' (o.g.)	Attendance: 5,069; Referee: Graham Horwood

24 November 2009 18	Crewe Alexandra	2–1	Burton Albion	Alexandra Stadium
19:45	Donaldson 12'; Grant 19'	Report	Walker 90+4'; Webster (yellow card) 61' (unsporting behaviour); Walker (yellow card) 90+4' (unsporting behaviour)	Attendance: 3,446; Referee: Graham Salisbury

2 December 2009 19	Chesterfield	2–3	Crewe Alexandra	Saltergate
19:30	Somma missed pen (saved), 7'; Small missed pen (saved), 22'; Talbot 73'; Lester 89'; Page (yellow card) 49' (unsporting behaviour); Breckin (yellow card) 85' (unsporting behaviour)	Report	Donaldson 25'; Westwood 35'; Murphy 84'; Mitchel-King (yellow card) 22' (unsporting behaviour)	Attendance: 3,267; Referee: Peter Quinn

5 December 2009 20	Crewe Alexandra	0–0	Lincoln City	Alexandra Stadium
15:00		Report	Herd (yellow card) 46' (unsporting behaviour)	Attendance: 3,632; Referee: Mark Haywood

12 December 2009 21	Barnet	1–2	Crewe Alexandra	Underhill Stadium
15:00	Sinclair 40'; Butcher (yellow card) 90+2' (unsporting behaviour)	Report	Grant 25'; Donaldson 67'; Tootle (yellow card) 14' (unsporting behaviour); Westwood (yellow card) 58' (unsporting behaviour)	Attendance: 1,841; Referee: Keith Hill

19 December 2009 22	Crewe Alexandra	P–P	Torquay United	Alexandra Stadium
15:00		Postponed due to frozen pitch Source		Referee: Paul Tierney

26 December 2009 23	Crewe Alexandra	2–2	Rochdale	Alexandra Stadium
15:00	Westwood 71'; Tootle 77'	Report	Dawson 53'; Higginbotham 74'; Kennedy (yellow card) 90' (unsporting behaviour)	Attendance: 5,563; Referee: Oliver Langford; Assistant referees: Scott Oldham and Andrew Scregg; Fourth official: Peter Davies

28 December 2009 24	Macclesfield Town	4–1	Crewe Alexandra	Moss Rose
15:00	Wright 4'; Bolland 13'; Daniel 30'; Sappleton 90+2'; Draper (yellow card) 57' (unsporting behaviour)	Report	Zola 64'; Westwood (yellow card) 87' (dissent)	Attendance: 3,449; Referee: Jock Waugh; Assistant referees: Ian Smedley and Nigel Smith; Fourth official: Danny Roberts

1 January 2010 25	Hereford United	P–P	Crewe Alexandra	Edgar Street
15:00		Postponed due to frozen pitch Source

9 January 2010 26	Crewe Alexandra	P–P	Grimsby Town	Alexandra Stadium
15:00		Postponed due to frozen pitch Source

16 January 2010 27	Dagenham and Redbridge	2–0	Crewe Alexandra	Victoria Road
15:00	Scott 35'; Green 41'	Report		Attendance: 1,951; Referee: Russell Booth

19 January 2010 25	Hereford United	1–1	Crewe Alexandra	Edgar Street
19:45	Constantine 42'; Lunt (yellow card) 52' (unsporting behaviour); Jones (yellow card) 64' (unsporting behaviour)	Report	Donaldson 49'; Miller (yellow card) 54' (unsporting behaviour)	Attendance: 1,367; Referee: Chris Sarginson

23 January 2010 28	Crewe Alexandra	3–0	Darlington	Alexandra Stadium
15:00	Zola 25'; Grant 30'; Zola 34'; Miller (yellow card) 86' (unsporting behaviour)	Report	Arnison (yellow card) 38' (unsporting behaviour)	Attendance: 3,717; Referee: Andy Woolmer

30 January 2010 29	Crewe Alexandra	1–2	Bournemouth	Alexandra Stadium
15:00	Murphy 66'; Schumacher (yellow card) 62' (unsporting behaviour); Donaldson (yellow card) 83' (unsporting behaviour)	Report	Fletcher 22'; Robinson 63'	Attendance: 3,741; Referee: Anthony Taylor

2 February 2010 22	Crewe Alexandra	1–1	Torquay United	Alexandra Stadium
19:45	Miller 90'	Report	Zebroski 7'	Attendance: 3,421; Referee: Paul Tierney

6 February 2010 30	Rochdale	2–0	Crewe Alexandra	Spotland
15:00	O'Grady 8'; Tootle 46' (o.g.)	Report		Attendance: 3,164; Referee: Steve Rushton; Assistant referees: Chris Akers and Jonathan Hunt; Fourth official: William Smallwood

12 February 2010 31	Burton Albion	1–2	Crewe Alexandra	Pirelli Stadium
19:45 (Game delayed to 20:00 due to match official illness)	Harrad 28'	Report	Miller 27'; Donaldson 84'; Worley (yellow card) 82' (unsporting behaviour)	Attendance: 2,985; Referee: Darren Drysdale; Assistant referees: Mark Griffiths and Michael Naylor; Fourth official: Roy Burton

20 February 2010 32	Crewe Alexandra	3–2	Northampton Town	Alexandra Stadium
15:00	Westwood 16'; Westwood 66'; Walton 69'; Miller (yellow card) 19' (unsporting behaviour); Walton (yellow card) 53' (unsporting behaviour)	Report	Gilligan 45+1'; Akinfenwa 57'; Hinton (yellow card) 42' (unsporting behaviour); Gilbert (yellow card) 65' (unsporting behaviour); Beckwith (yellow card) 73' (unsporting behaviour); Gilligan (yellow card) 80' (dissent); Guttridge (yellow card) 90+3' (dissent)	Attendance: 4,036; Referee: Peter Quinn; Assistant referees: Matthew Bristow and Peter Davies; Fourth official: Russell Fletcher

23 February 2010 33	Crewe Alexandra	0–1	Chesterfield	Alexandra Stadium
19:45		Report	Talbot 27'; Gray (yellow card) 59' (unsporting behaviour)	Attendance: 3,278; Referee: Steve Tanner; Assistant referees: Darren Bond and Dean Mohareb; Fourth official: Steven Copeland

27 February 2010 34	Lincoln City	1–1	Crewe Alexandra	Sincil Bank
15:00	Somma 46'; Hughton (yellow card) 82' (unsporting behaviour)	Report	Miller 84'	Attendance: 3,110; Referee: Eddie Ilderton; Assistant referees: Matthew Dicicco and Stephen Smith; Fourth official: Stephen Ross

6 March 2010 35	Crewe Alexandra	2–2	Barnet	Alexandra Stadium
15:00	Donaldson 13'; Donaldson 82'	Report	O'Flynn 23'; Lockwood 29'; Breen (yellow card) 90+1' (unsporting behaviour)	Attendance: 3,551; Referee: Gary Sutton; Assistant referees: Kevin Mattocks and Iain Siddall; Fourth official: Mark Heywood

9 March 2010 26	Crewe Alexandra	4–2	Grimsby Town	Alexandra Stadium
19:45	Moore 29'; Grant 35'; Westwood 55'; Donaldson 90+1'; Martin (red card) 86' (violent conduct)	Report	Akpa Akpro 32'; Sinclair 41'; Sweeney (yellow card) 62' (unsporting behaviour); Linwood (yellow card) 72' (unsporting behaviour)	Attendance: 3,272; Referee: Colin Webster; Assistant referees: Martin Dexter and Darren Handley; Fourth official: Chris Kavanagh

13 March 2010 36	Torquay United	1–1	Crewe Alexandra	Plainmoor
15:00	Rendell 38'; Zebroski (yellow card) 48' (unsporting behaviour); Carlisle (yellow card) 62' (unsporting behaviour); Mansell (yellow card) 87' (unsporting behaviour)	Report	Donaldson 85'; Miller missed pen (saved), 77'	Attendance: 2,507; Referee: Rob Shoebridge

20 March 2010 37	Crewe Alexandra	0–1	Notts County	Alexandra Stadium
15:00	Westwood (red card) 90+2' (violent conduct)	Report	Edwards 51'; Ravenhill (yellow card) 12' (unsporting behaviour); Davies missed pen (saved), 34'; Hunt (yellow card) 38' (unsporting behaviour); Thompson (yellow card) 65' (unsporting behaviour); Rodgers (yellow card) 90+3' (unsporting behaviour); Rodgers (yellow card) 90+5' (red card) (violent conduct)	Attendance: 5,003; Referee: Darren Sheldrake; Assistant referees: Danny Roberts and Peter Wright; Fourth official: Andy Newell

27 March 2010 38	Port Vale	0–1	Crewe Alexandra	Vale Park
15:00	Owen (yellow card) 59' (unsporting behaviour); Taylor (yellow card) 68' (unsporting behaviour); Griffith (yellow card) 71' (unsporting behaviour)	Report	Miller 60' (pen.); Schumacher (yellow card) 72' (unsporting behaviour)	Attendance: 7,232; Referee: Chris Sarginson

2 April 2010 39	Morecambe	4–3	Crewe Alexandra	Christie Park
15:00	Jevons 53'; Curtis 87'; Mullin 90+2'; Artell 90+5'; Parrish (red card) 71' (professional foul); Duffy (yellow card) 80' (unsporting behaviour); Wilson (yellow card) 84' (unsporting behaviour)	Report	Grant 17'; Miller 30'; Donaldson 62'; Miller (yellow card) 30' (unsporting behaviour)	Attendance: 2,347; Referee: David Foster; Assistant referees: Paul Davison and Kevin Mattocks; Fourth official: Paul Kettlewell

5 April 2010 40	Crewe Alexandra	1–2	Cheltenham Town	Alexandra Stadium
15:00	Martin 90'	Report	Richards 25'; Richards 71' (pen.); Hayles (yellow card) 90' (unsporting behaviour)	Attendance: 3,488; Referee: Andy Haines

10 April 2010 41	Crewe Alexandra	0–3	Shrewsbury Town	Alexandra Stadium
15:00	Schumacher (yellow card) 35'; Walton (yellow card) 77'	Report	Hibbert 30'; Bradshaw 86'; Bradshaw 90+1'; Skarz (yellow card) 66'	Attendance: 4,283; Referee: Carl Boyeson

13 April 2010 42	Bury	3–0	Crewe Alexandra	Gigg Lane
19:45	Morrell 30'; Lowe 48'; Bishop 88'	report		Attendance: 2,178; Referee: Dean Whitestone

17 April 2010 43	Aldershot Town	1–1	Crewe Alexandra	Recreation Ground
15:00	Harding 41'; Winfield (yellow card) 79' (unsporting behaviour); Bozanic (yellow card) 90+1'	report	Donaldson 1'; Zola (yellow card) 87'	Attendance: 2,966; Referee: Darren Deadman

24 April 2010 44	Crewe Alexandra	5–1	Accrington Stanley	Alexandra Stadium
15:00	Zola 5'; Donaldson 62'; Westwood missed pen (saved), 70'; Westwood 70'; Grant 81'; Zola 90+2'; Donaldson (yellow card) 37'; Walton (yellow card) 45+1' (unsporting behaviour)	Report	Brayford 65' (o.g.); Dunbavin (red card) 67' (professional foul)	Attendance: 3,810; Referee: Oliver Langford

1 May 2010 45	Rotherham United	0–0	Crewe Alexandra	Don Valley Stadium
15:00	Ellison (yellow card) 34'	Report		Attendance: 4,142; Referee: Russell Booth; Assistant referees: Russell Fletcher and Danny Gratton; Fourth official: Tony Peart

8 May 2010 46	Crewe Alexandra	0–1	Bradford City	Alexandra Stadium
15:00		Report	Kendall 67'; Williams (yellow card) 51' (unsporting behaviour)	Attendance: 5,172; Referee: Steven Cook

Last updated: 11 May 2010

=== Football League Cup ===
11 August 2009 First round	Crewe Alexandra	1–2	Blackpool (FLC)	Alexandra Stadium
19:45	Zola 73'; Ada (yellow card) 57' (unsporting behaviour)	Report	Nowland 51'; Nardiello 79'; Taylor-Fletcher (yellow card) 56' (unsporting behaviour)	Attendance: 2,991; Referee: Phil Gibbs

Last updated: 15 August 2009

=== Football League Trophy ===
1 September 2009 First round	Crewe Alexandra	1–4	Stockport County (FL1)	Alexandra Stadium
	Zola 90+3'; Walton (yellow card) 59' (unsporting behaviour)	Report	Baker 8'; Baker 33'; Bignall 41'; Baker 90+4'; Halls (yellow card) 55' (unsporting behaviour)	Attendance: 2,331; Referee: Eddie Ilderton

Last updated: 1 September 2009

=== FA Cup ===
7 November 2009 First round	(BSP) York City	3–2	Crewe Alexandra	Bootham Crescent
15:00	Brodie 39'; Pacquette 86'; Brodie 88'	Report	Grant 33'; Zola 41'	Attendance: 3,070; Referee: Gary Sutton

Last updated: 8 November 2009
