= Wembley F.C. =

Association football club in England

Coordinates: 51°33′27″N 0°18′57″W

Wembley Football Club
- Full name: Wembley Football Club
- Nickname: The Lions
- Founded: 1946; 80 years ago
- Ground: Vale Farm
- Capacity: 2,450
- Chairman: Brian Gumm
- Manager: Ian Bates
- League: Combined Counties League Division One
- 2025–26: Combined Counties League Division One, 5th of 23
- Website: www.wembleyfc.com
Home colours	Away colours

Wembley Football Club is an English semi-professional football club based in Wembley, in the London Borough of Brent, London, England. Founded in 1946, the club currently play in the Combined Counties League Division One.

They play in red and white and are nicknamed "The Lions", due to the lion on the coat of arms for the old Borough of Wembley. Traditional local rivals for Wembley are Harrow Borough and Edgware Town, while Wealdstone F.C. are also regarded as rivals although, as Wealdstone have regularly played at a higher level, meetings between the clubs have been rare.

== History ==
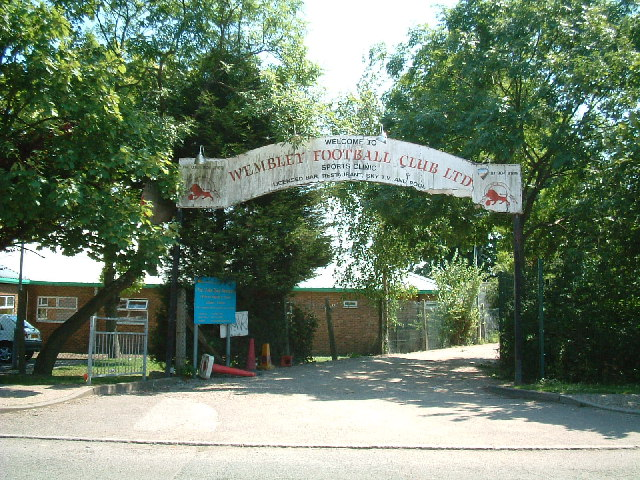
The entrance to the club's ground

The club was established in 1946 during the post-Second World War football boom, as many in the area felt it an anomaly that the area which proudly boasted the English National Stadium did not have its own senior football team. It was formed from two local Junior clubs: Sudbury Rangers and Sudbury Ratepayers. As a result of their efforts, the club took the motto "A Posse Ad Esse" ("From Possibility To Reality").

Wembley became champions of the Middlesex Senior League in only their second season of existence in 1947–48. They then spent two seasons in the Spartan League Western Division, becoming Champions in the 1950–51 season. The next season saw them move from the Spartan League to become one of the founder members of the Delphian League. Vale Farm's record attendance was recorded in 1952 when 2,654 attended a derby game with local rivals Wealdstone. In the 1955–56 season, they finished as runners up in the league. That season also saw them reach the finals of both the London Senior Cup (losing 1–3 to Briggs Sports at Ilford) and Middlesex Senior Cup (losing 1–2 to Hendon at Wealdstone). Notable players from this era was the Captain Len Berryman, prolific striker Stan Lowen and long serving defenders Tony Carroll and Arthur Percy.The team played in red and white quartered shirts. The club then joined the Corinthian League the following season (1956–57).

That competition merged with the Athenian League in 1963 and became the First Division where the club remained until gaining promotion to the Premier Division in 1968. Malcolm Allison's first job in football management was with Wembley but most of his reign unfortunately coincided with the Big Freeze of 1962–63 so his impact was minimal. 1967–68 saw Wembley's best ever FA Amateur Cup run as they reached the 2nd round proper. The club in the 1972–73 season finished bottom of the Premier division but were saved from relegation when a lot of clubs left the Athenian league to join the Isthmian League, with this loss the Athenian League had to restructure into Divisions One and Two, and Wembley remained in the top division. However they were elevated to the Isthmian league at the end of the 1974–75 season.

Wembley remained in the second tier of the Isthmian League for 21 seasons, during which time they came close to promotion to the Premier Division on two occasions in the 1980s but finished third on both occasions. During this period Wembley reached the 1st round proper of the FA Cup for the one and only time in 1980–81 where they lost 0–3 to Enfield. In 1983–84 Wembley reached the semi-finals of the Isthmian League Cup before losing 4–1 to the eventual winners Sutton United. Wembley were one of the most successful clubs in Middlesex throughout the 1980s appearing in eight County Cup finals – winning five, including doing the County Cup 'Double' in 1986–87 by winning both the Middlesex Senior Cup and the Middlesex Senior Charity Cup. Wembley reached both finals again the following season but lost both. The Middlesex Senior Charity Cup Final, was played at Wembley Stadium in front of almost 5,000 supporters but the Lions lost 3–0 to Hendon. They had however beaten Football League side Brentford at Griffin Park in the semi-final coming from 0–1 down to win 2–1. It is the only time (thus far) in Wembley's history that they have beaten Football League opposition in a competitive match.

The 1990s saw two excellent FA Cup runs, reaching the 4th qualifying round in 1992–93 before eventually going out to Nuneaton Borough after three replays (including one played in front of over 2,000 people) and the 3rd qualifying round in 1994–95 – beating Welling United – then of the Conference – 4–1 away from home. 1994–95 also saw The Lions win the Middlesex Senior Charity Cup for the fifth time, beating Hampton 2–0 at Northwood. Hopes of promotion were high as Wembley entered their Jubilee season in 1995–96 but the loss of key players Giuliano Grazioli to Football League side Peterborough United and Charlie Flaherty meant that The Lions struggled from the off and eventually were relegated for the first time in the club's history. In a strange coincidence this season also saw Wembley's best ever FA Trophy, reaching the 2nd round proper before losing 0–2 to Conference side Northwich Victoria at Vale Farm. The club though bounced straight back up to division one in the 1996–97 campaign, and almost topped this off with another Middlesex Charity Cup win but lost 0–1 to local rivals Edgware Town.

Under the management of Errol Dyer, 1998–99 saw Wembley reach the Middlesex Senior Cup final at Enfield's Southbury Road but they eventually lost to Hendon on penalties – the game having finished 2–2 after extra time. However that was the highlight of the season as the club was relegated back to Division two. The club then spent the next three seasons in Division two, when as part of the re-organisation for the 2002–03 campaign of the Isthmian League, all Division two clubs were elevated to the regionalised Division ones and Wembley were put in Division one North. However they could only survive one season in the higher league and were back in Division two.

In the 2005–06 season, as a result of the restructuring of non-league football, Wembley were moved sideways into the Combined Counties League Premier Division. After a strong first season when The Lions remained in contention for the title for most of the season, the club have struggled at the wrong end of the table since. The club rounded off the 2010–11 season by reaching the Combined Counties League Premier Challenge Cup Final – their first final in 12 years – but lost 0–1 to Sandhurst Town. The final was played at Farnborough Town FC's Cherrywood Road ground.

In the 2011–12 season, their FA Cup extra preliminary-round tie against Ascot United, was shown exclusively via a stream from Facebook; funded by the FA Cup's new sponsors, multinational brewing company Budweiser (Anheuser-Busch), it was the first broadcast of its kind anywhere in sport. Wembley won the match 2–1, with second-half goals from Chris Korten and Roy Byron, securing the win for The Lions in front of a record attendance of 1,149 at Ascot's Racecourse ground.

On 15 March 2012, Budweiser (Anheuser-Busch) announced that they would now be sponsoring Wembley FC as part of a marketing campaign to promote their involvement with clubs at all levels after taking over the sponsorship of the FA Cup The sponsorship deal included a clubhouse upgrade and provision of a team minibus. Other initiatives include the implementation of a new responsible drinking programme as well as promotion of the club in the wider Wembley community. On 28 March 2012, it was confirmed that Terry Venables would join the club in a technical advisor capacity.

On 21 June 2012 it was announced the club had recruited former internationals Ray Parlour, Martin Keown, Graeme Le Saux, Claudio Caniggia and Brian McBride to play in their FA Cup campaign that season, none of whom made a competitive appearance for the club. The north London side also hired David Seaman as goalkeeping coach. Ugo Ehiogu was drafted in later for the preliminary qualifying game against Uxbridge, but could not prevent Wembley from being knocked out. At the end of the 2020–21 season the club were transferred to the Premier Division North of the Combined Counties League.

== Ground ==
Wembley play their home games at Vale Farm, Watford Road, Wembley, Middlesex, HA0 3HG. The stadium has a capacity of 2,450.

The ground was used in 1966 as the training base for the England national football team during their successful FIFA World Cup campaign.

The ground was also shared by Hendon F.C. Hendon shared Vale Farm for four full seasons from the 2009-10 campaign. The ground is now shared with Cricklewood Wanderers F.C.

== Records ==
- Best FA Cup performance: First round, 1980–81
- Best FA Trophy performance: Second round, 1995–96
- Best FA Vase performance: Third round, 1999–00, 2007–08, 2016–17
- Best FA Amateur Cup performance: Second round, 1968–69

== Honours ==
=== League honours ===
- Athenian League
  - Runners-up (1): 1974–75
- Athenian League Division One
  - Runners-up (1): 1967–68
- Delphian League
  - Runners-up (1): 1955–56
- Spartan League (Western Division)
  - Champions (1): 1950–51
- Middlesex Senior League
  - Champions (1): 1947–48

=== Cup honours ===
- Middlesex Senior Cup
  - Winners (2): 1983–84, 1986–87
  - Runners-up (7): 1955–56, 1968–69, 1978–79, 1987–88, 1991–92, 1992–93, 1998–99
- Middlesex Senior Charity Cup
  - Winners (5): 1967–68 (joint), 1980–81 (joint), 1982–83, 1986–87, 1994–95
  - Runners-up (2): 1996–97, 2013–14
- London Senior Cup
  - Runners-up (1): 1955–56
- Spartan League Dunkels Cup
  - Winners (1): 1950–51 (joint)
- North West Middlesex Invitation Cup
  - Winners (1): 1956–57
- Middlesex League Cup
  - Winners (1): 1946–47
- Suburban League Cup
  - Winners (1): 1984–85
- Combined Counties League Premier Challenge Cup
  - Runners-up (1): 2010–11

== Wembley versus Football League opposition ==
- 1956–57: London Challenge Cup – Arsenal (a) L 1–5
- 1959–60: London Challenge Cup – Chelsea (a) L 0–16 (Wembley's record defeat)
- 1966–67: London Challenge Cup – Queens Park Rangers (a) L 0–5
- 1987–88: Middlesex Senior Charity Cup Semi-final – Brentford (a) W 2–1
- 1989–90: Middlesex Senior Charity Cup Semi-final – Chelsea (h) L 0–2
- 1990–91: Middlesex Senior Charity Cup – Chelsea L 2–3
- 1991–92: Middlesex Senior Charity Cup – Brentford L 0–1
- 1995–96: Middlesex Senior Charity Cup – Brentford L 0–1

== Former players ==
1. Players that have played/managed in the football league or any foreign equivalent to this level (i.e. fully professional league).
2. Players with full international caps.
- (England) Danny Bailey
- (England) Richard Cadette
- (Argentina) Claudio Caniggia
- (England) Keith Cassells
- (England) Ken Coote
- (Poland) Bartłomiej Fogler
- (England) Giuliano Grazioli
- (Mali) Karamoko Kéïta
- (England) Martin Keown
- (United States) Brian McBride
- (Guyana) Howard Newton
- (England) Steve Parsons
- (England) Tony Readings
- (Wales) Gary Roberts
- (England) Gary Seward
- (England) Ugo Ehiogu (Played one match in the FA Cup for the club)

== See also ==
- Football in London
