= Karamoko Kéïta =

Malian footballer

Personal information
- Date of birth: 21 September 1974 (age 52)
- Position: Goalkeeper

Senior career*
| Years | Team | Apps | (Gls) |
| 1993–1994 | FCM Garges-lès-Gonesse | | |
| 1999–2000 | Yeading | | |
| 2000–2001 | Wembley | | |
| 2001–2006 | Harrow Borough | | |
| 2006–2007 | Hayes | | |
| 2006–2007 | → Northwood (loan) | 2 | (0) |
| 2007–2008 | Wealdstone | 24 | (0) |
| 2009–2011 | Harrow Borough | | |

International career
| 1994–2002 | Mali | 4 | (0) |
- * Club domestic league appearances and goals

Karamoko Kéïta (born 21 September 1974) is a Malian former international footballer who played as a goalkeeper.

== Career ==
Kéïta played club football for FCM Garges-lès-Gonesse, Yeading, Wembley, Harrow Borough, Hayes, Northwood and Wealdstone. He combined his playing career with a job in the pharmaceutical industry.

He represented Mali at international level at the 1994 African Cup of Nations and 2002 African Cup of Nations tournaments.
