= Mat Mitchel-King =

English footballer

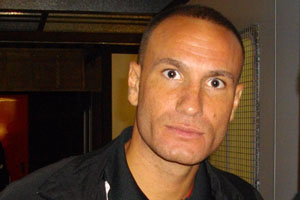
- Mitchel-King in 2010

Personal information
- Full name: Mathew John Mitchel-King
- Date of birth: 12 September 1983 (age 43)
- Place of birth: Reading, England
- Height: 6 ft 4 in (1.93 m)
- Positions: Defender; midfielder

Team information
- Current team: Hayes & Yeading United

Senior career*
| Years | Team | Apps | (Gls) |
| 2001–2002 | Cambridge City | | |
| 2002–2005 | Mildenhall Town | | |
| 2005–2009 | Histon | 141 | (7) |
| 2009–2011 | Crewe Alexandra | 46 | (0) |
| 2011–2013 | AFC Wimbledon | 47 | (2) |
| 2013–2015 | Dartford | 61 | (0) |
| 2015–2016 | St Neots Town | 36 | (6) |
| 2016 | Hemel Hempstead Town | 12 | (0) |
| 2016–2017 | Chesham United | 29 | (1) |
| 2017 | Mildenhall Town | | |
| 2017– | Hayes & Yeading United | 5 | (0) |
- * Club domestic league appearances and goals as of 02:53, 19 October 2017 (UTC)

Mathew John Mitchel-King (born 12 September 1983) is an English semi-professional footballer who plays as a defender for Hayes & Yeading United. He can also play as a midfielder.

== Club career ==
=== Histon ===
Mitchel-King was born in Reading, Berkshire. While at Histon, Mitchel-King was a part-time body double of Rio Ferdinand for the Nike adverts. He gave this up when he signed a two-year full-time contract with Crewe Alexandra.

=== Crewe Alexandra ===
Mitchel-King joined Crewe Alexandra on 29 June 2009, on a free transfer after rejecting a new deal with Histon. He made his league debut in Crewe's opening day defeat to Dagenham & Redbridge. He was released from the club in May 2011.

=== AFC Wimbledon ===
On 24 June 2011, newly promoted League Two side AFC Wimbledon announced the signing of Mitchel-King after his release from Crewe Alexandra. However, the start of his season was hampered by an injury which kept him sidelined for the first twelve games of the season. He made his first team debut in a London Senior Cup tie against Wingate & Finchley on 29 November 2011. He was released by AFC Wimbledon with nine other players on 14 May 2013.

=== Dartford ===
Following his release from AFC Wimbledon, Mitchel-King joined Conference side Dartford on 9 August 2013. He made his debut on 10 August 2013 in a 1–0 win over Alfreton Town. On 29 January 2015, he left Dartford following the expiration of his contract and long-term work commitments.

=== St. Neots Town ===
In January 2015, following his release from Dartford, he signed for Southern Football League Premier Division side St Neots Town on a free transfer.

=== Hemel Hempstead Town ===
Mitchel-King left St Neots Town to join National League South side Hemel Hempstead Town in early 2016, but left after the conclusion of the 2015–16 season.

=== Chesham United ===
He then joined Chesham United.

== Career statistics ==
As of match played 24 January 2015.

Club statistics
| Club | Season | League | | | FA Cup | | League Cup | | Other | | Total | |
| Club | Season | Division | Apps | Goals | Apps | Goals | Apps | Goals | Apps | Goals | Apps | Goals |
|---|---|---|---|---|---|---|---|---|---|---|---|---|
| Histon | 2005–06 | Conference South | 23 | 1 | 0 | 0 | — | | 3 (Note: One appearance in FA Trophy, two in Conference South play-offs) | 0 | 26 | 1 |
| Histon | 2006–07 | Conference South | 39 | 2 | 1 | 0 | — | | 5 (Note: Appearance(s) in FA Trophy) | 0 | 45 | 2 |
| Histon | 2007–08 | Conference Premier | 40 | 3 | 2 | 0 | — | | 3 (Note: Two appearances in FA Trophy, one in Conference League Cup) | 0 | 45 | 3 |
| Histon | 2008–09 | Conference Premier | 39 | 1 | 5 | 0 | — | | 3 (Note: One appearance in FA Trophy, two appearances in Conference Premier play-offs) | 0 | 47 | 1 |
| Histon | Total | | 141 | 7 | 8 | 0 | — | | 14 | 0 | 163 | 7 |
| Crewe Alexandra | 2009–10 | League Two | 32 | 0 | 1 | 0 | 1 | 0 | 1 (Note: Appearance in Football League Trophy) | 0 | 35 | 0 |
| Crewe Alexandra | 2010–11 | League Two | 14 | 0 | 1 | 0 | 0 | 0 | 1 | 0 | 16 | 0 |
| Crewe Alexandra | Total | | 46 | 0 | 2 | 0 | 1 | 0 | 2 | 0 | 51 | 0 |
| AFC Wimbledon | 2011–12 | League Two | 24 | 0 | 0 | 0 | 0 | 0 | 0 | 0 | 24 | 0 |
| AFC Wimbledon | 2012–13 | League Two | 23 | 2 | 1 | 0 | 1 | 0 | 0 | 0 | 25 | 2 |
| AFC Wimbledon | Total | | 47 | 2 | 1 | 0 | 1 | 0 | 0 | 0 | 49 | 2 |
| Dartford | 2013–14 | Conference Premier | 33 | 0 | 3 | 0 | — | | 1 | 0 | 37 | 0 |
| Dartford | 2014–15 | Conference Premier | 28 | 0 | 2 | 0 | — | | 3 | 0 | 33 | 0 |
| Dartford | Total | | 61 | 0 | 5 | 0 | — | | 4 | 0 | 70 | 0 |
| Career total | | | 293 | 9 | 16 | 0 | 2 | 0 | 20 | 0 | 331 | 9 |
