= Rhys Taylor =

Welsh footballer (born 1990)

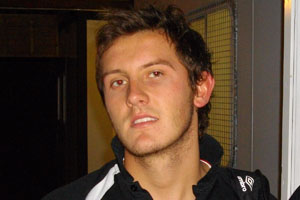
- Taylor while at Crewe Alexandra in 2010

Personal information
- Full name: Rhys Francis Taylor
- Date of birth: 7 April 1990 (age 36)
- Place of birth: Port Talbot, Wales
- Position: Goalkeeper

Youth career
- Manchester United
- 2005–2007: Chelsea

Senior career*
Years	Team	Apps	(Gls)
2007–2012	Chelsea	0	(0)
2009–2010	→ Queens Park Rangers (loan)	0	(0)
2010–2011	→ Crewe Alexandra (loan)	44	(0)
2012	→ Rotherham United (loan)	20	(0)
2012–2013	Southend United	0	(0)
2013	Preston North End	0	(0)
2013–2015	Macclesfield Town	109	(0)
2015–2016	Newport County	1	(0)
2015–2016	→ Wrexham (loan)	27	(0)
2016–2018	AFC Fylde	44	(0)
2018	→ Tranmere Rovers (loan)	6	(0)
2018–2019	Macclesfield Town	9	(0)
2019	Bradford (Park Avenue)	6	(0)
Total		266	(0)

International career
2004–2006	Wales U17	9	(0)
2006–2009	Wales U19	3	(0)
2008–2011	Wales U21	5	(0)
- * Club domestic league appearances and goals as of 21:08, 24 January 2019 (UTC)

Rhys Francis Taylor (born 7 April 1990) is a Welsh former professional footballer who has played as a goalkeeper for Bradford (Park Avenue). He has played for Wales up to under-21 level.

== Early life ==
He attended Glan Afan Comprehensive School, Port Talbot, and later moved to the Richard Challoner School, New Malden.

== Club career ==
Born in Port Talbot, West Glamorgan, Taylor played mainly in the Chelsea Reserves and the Youth Team but occasionally got called to sit on the bench when another goalkeeper became injured. He joined Queens Park Rangers on loan in November 2009 until 4 January 2010. During the 2009–10 season, he made eight appearances for Chelsea's reserve team as their first choice goalkeeper.

He joined League Two team Crewe Alexandra for pre-season training in June 2010 and an agreement was made for him to join the club on loan. The loan was initially set to last for two months, with Taylor expected to gain first team experience as a replacement for injured goalkeeper Steve Phillips. The loan was completed on 6 July. On 12 July he appeared for Crewe's first team in a friendly match against Quorn, earning a clean sheet in Crewe's 4–0 win. The loan period was subsequently converted into a season-long arrangement, with Taylor soon establishing himself as first-choice goalkeeper.

On 2 January 2012, Taylor moved to Rotherham United on a one-month loan deal. He made his debut the same day in a 3–0 win over Bradford City, despite not even training with the squad prior the match. On 31 January 2012, Rotherham extended Taylor's loan deal until the end of the season.

Taylor returned to Chelsea at the end of League Two season after a successful spell at the club, playing 20 games. On 1 June 2012, he was released with Salomon Kalou, José Bosingwa and Marko Mitrović. He never made a professional appearance for the Premier League side.

Following his release from Chelsea, Taylor joined Southend United on a free transfer before joining Preston North End on non-contract terms. But after twice on the bench as an unused substitute, Taylor left Preston to join Lower League side Macclesfield Town as cover for the injured Lance Cronin and was given number 40 shirt. Days after signing for the club, on 1 February 2013, Taylor made his debut for the club, in a 4–0 win over Ebbsfleet United, also keeping a clean sheet on his debut. Since his debut, Taylor established himself in the first team as the club's first choice goalkeeper and remained there for the remainder of the season. Ahead of a new season, Taylor signed a new contract with the club.

In May 2015 Taylor signed for League Two club Newport County. He made his debut for Newport on 1 September 2015 in the Football League Trophy first round match versus Swindon Town. On 29 October 2015, Taylor joined Conference National team Wrexham on loan until January 2016, subsequently extended to the end of the 2015–16 season. Taylor finally made his league debut for Newport County on 7 May 2016 versus A.F.C Wimbledon in the final match of the 2015–16 season. He was released by Newport on 10 May 2016 at the end of his contract.

On 6 August 2016, Taylor joined National League North side AFC Fylde on a one-year deal.

== International career ==
Taylor was called up to the Wales under-21 squad at the age of 17 in 2008. He was subsequently identified by manager Brian Flynn to be one of the country's most promising future prospects.

== Career statistics ==
As of match played 24 April 2018

Appearances and goals by club, season and competition
Club	Season	League			FA Cup		League Cup		Other		Total	
Club	Season	Division	Apps	Goals	Apps	Goals	Apps	Goals	Apps	Goals	Apps	Goals
Chelsea	2007–08	Premier League	0	0	0	0	0	0	0	0	0	0
Chelsea	2008–09	Premier League	0	0	0	0	0	0	0	0	0	0
Chelsea	2009–10	Premier League	0	0	0	0	0	0	0	0	0	0
Chelsea	Total		0	0	0	0	0	0	0	0	0	0
Queens Park Rangers (loan)	2009–10	Championship	0	0	0	0	—		—		0	0
Crewe Alexandra (loan)	2010–11	League Two	44	0	1	0	2	0	2 (Note: Appearances in Football League Trophy)	0	49	0
Rotherham United (loan)	2011–12	League Two	20	0	—		—		—		20	0
Preston North End	2012–13	League One	0	0	—		—		—		0	0
Macclesfield Town	2012–13	Conference Premier	18	0	—		—		—		18	0
Macclesfield Town	2013–14	Conference Premier	45	0	4	0	—		0	0	49	0
Macclesfield Town	2014–15	Conference Premier	46	0	2	0	—		0	0	48	0
Macclesfield Town	Total		109	0	6	0	—		0	0	115	0
Newport County	2015–16	League Two	1	0	0	0	0	0	0	0	1	0
Wrexham (loan)	2015–16	National League	27	0	—		—		2 (Note: Appearances in FA Trophy)	0	29	0
AFC Fylde	2016–17	National League North	34	0	0	0	—		2	0	36	0
AFC Fylde	2017–18	National League	10	0	0	0	—		0	0	10	0
AFC Fylde	Total		44	0	0	0	0	0	2	0	46	0
Tranmere Rovers (loan)	2017–18	National League	6	0	0	0	—		0	0	6	0
Career total			250	0	7	0	2	0	6	0	265	0
