= Gary Seward =

English footballer (born 1961)

Personal information
- Date of birth: 1 October 1961 (age 65)
- Place of birth: Paddington, London, England
- Height: 5 ft 7 in (1.70 m)
- Position: Forward

Senior career*
Years	Team	Apps	(Gls)
1979–1980	Blackpool	5	(0)
- Harrow Borough
- Wembley
- Kuopion Palloseura
- Clapton
- → IFK Luleå (loan)
- Kingstonian

Managerial career
- 2013: Forest Green Rovers (caretaker)
- * Club domestic league appearances and goals

Gary Seward (born 1 October 1961) is an English former professional footballer who played in the Football League as a forward for Blackpool.

He has worked as a scout for a number of clubs including Bolton Wanderers, Coventry City and Wimbledon. Between October 2010 and October 2013 he worked as assistant manager at Forest Green Rovers and had a brief spell in caretaker charge of the club.

== Playing career ==
Seward was born in Paddington, London, and started out playing for Rutherford School, his secondary school, for whom he was captain. He was later picked for the West London representative schoolboy team, for whom he was also captain, and also represented Inner London schools. He played in the Football League for Blackpool, also appearing for Harrow Borough, Wembley, Kuopion Palloseura, Clapton, IFK Luleå (on loan) and Kingstonian.

== Coaching and scouting career ==
Seward was assistant coach at IFK Göteborg before becoming Wimbledon's European scout, chief scout, and reserve team manager. From 2004 to 2006 Seward was European scout for Bolton Wanderers. In September 2006 he was made chief scout/European scout at Crystal Palace, a role he undertook until June 2007. He then left Crystal Palace and followed his former manager Iain Dowie to Coventry City in August 2008, joining as European scout/UK scout on a three-year fixed termed contract. He left the club in May 2010.

In October 2010, Seward was appointed as assistant manager to Dave Hockaday at Conference National outfit Forest Green Rovers. In October 2013, he was made interim manager at Forest Green after Hockaday departed the club by mutual consent. However, on 29 October 2013, he left when it was confirmed he would not be handed the managerial role at the club on a permanent basis.
