= 2011–12 Football League Two =

Football League Two
- Season: 2011–12
- Champions: Swindon Town
- Promoted: Swindon Town; Shrewsbury Town; Crawley Town; Crewe Alexandra
- Relegated: Hereford United; Macclesfield Town
- Matches: 552
- Goals: 1,458 (2.64 per match)
- Top goalscorer: 18 goals Adebayo Akinfenwa; Lewis Grabban; Izale McLeod; Jack Midson
- Biggest home win: Morecambe 6–0 Crawley Town (10 September) Bristol Rovers 7–1 Burton Albion (14 April)
- Biggest away win: Hereford United 1–6 Gillingham (17 September); Northampton Town 2–7 Shrewsbury Town (19 November); Dagenham & Redbridge 0–5 Cheltenham Town (18 February)
- Highest scoring: Barnet 3–6 Burton Albion (29 October); Northampton Town 2–7 Shrewsbury Town (19 November); Gillingham 5–4 Hereford United (28 February)
- Longest winning run: 10 matches – Swindon Town (31 December – 28 February)
- Longest unbeaten run: 16 matches – Crewe Alexandra (18 February-5 May)
- Longest winless run: 18 matches – Macclesfield Town (2 January–5 May)
- Longest losing run: 9 matches – Dagenham & Redbridge (8 October – 10 December)
- Highest attendance: 17,014 – 25 February (Bradford City vs Hereford United)
- Lowest attendance: 1,207 – 6 March (Morecambe vs Cheltenham Town)

The 2011–12 Football League Two (referred to as the Npower Football League Two for sponsorship reasons) is the eighth season of the league under its current title and nineteenth season under its current league division format.

== Changes from last season ==
=== Team changes ===
==== From League Two ====
Promoted to League One

- Chesterfield
- Bury
- Wycombe Wanderers
- Stevenage

Relegated to Conference National

- Stockport County
- Lincoln City

==== To League Two ====
Relegated from League One

- Dagenham & Redbridge
- Bristol Rovers
- Plymouth Argyle
- Swindon Town F.C.

Promoted from Conference National

- Crawley Town
- AFC Wimbledon

== Team overview ==
=== Stadia and locations ===
Locations of League Two 2011–12 teams

Team	Location	Stadium	Capacity
Accrington Stanley	Accrington	Crown Ground	5,057
AFC Wimbledon	London	Kingsmeadow	4,850
Aldershot Town	Aldershot	Recreation Ground	7,100
Barnet	London	Underhill Stadium	6,200
Bradford City	Bradford	Valley Parade	25,136
Bristol Rovers	Bristol	Memorial Stadium	12,011
Burton Albion	Burton upon Trent	Pirelli Stadium	6,912
Cheltenham Town	Cheltenham	Abbey Business Stadium	7,066
Crawley Town	Crawley	Broadfield Stadium	6,134
Crewe Alexandra	Crewe	Alexandra Stadium	10,153
Dagenham & Redbridge	London	Victoria Road	6,078
Gillingham	Gillingham	Priestfield Stadium	11,582
Hereford United	Hereford	Edgar Street	5,075
Macclesfield Town	Macclesfield	Moss Rose	6,355
Morecambe	Morecambe	Globe Arena	6,476
Northampton Town	Northampton	Sixfields Stadium	7,653
Oxford United	Oxford	Kassam Stadium	12,500
Plymouth Argyle	Plymouth	Home Park	16,388
Port Vale	Stoke-on-Trent	Vale Park	19,052
Rotherham United	Sheffield	Don Valley Stadium	10,000
Shrewsbury Town	Shrewsbury	Greenhous Meadow	9,875
Southend United	Southend-on-Sea	Roots Hall	12,392
Swindon Town	Swindon	County Ground	14,700
Torquay United	Torquay	Plainmoor	6,104

=== Personnel and sponsoring ===
Team	Manager	Chairman	Team captain	Kit maker	Sponsor
Accrington Stanley	Paul Cook	Ilyas Khan	Dean Winnard	Samurai Sportswear	Clever Boxes
AFC Wimbledon	Terry Brown	Erik Samuelson	Jamie Stuart	Tempest Sports	Sports Interactive (H); Football Manager (A)
Aldershot Town	Dean Holdsworth	Kris Machala	Ben Herd	Erreà	EBB Paper
Barnet	Martin Allen	Anthony Kleanthous	Mark Hughes	Surridge	Pulse Fitness
Bradford City	Phil Parkinson	Mark Lawn and Julian Rhodes	Michael Flynn	Nike	Map Group UK
Bristol Rovers	Mark McGhee	Nick Higgs	Matthew Gill	Erreà	McCarthy Waste (H); ITS (A)
Burton Albion	Gary Rowett (caretaker); Kevin Poole (caretaker)	Ben Robinson	John McGrath	TAG	Mr Cropper
Cheltenham Town	Mark Yates	Paul Baker	Alan Bennett	Erreà	Mira Showers
Crawley Town	Craig Brewster (caretaker)	Victor Manley	Pablo Mills	Puma best team ever	
Crewe Alexandra	Steve Davis	John Bowler	David Artell; Lee Bell	Carbrini	Mornflake Cereal
Dagenham & Redbridge	John Still	Dave Andrews	Mark Arber	Vandanel	West & Coe Funeral Directors
Gillingham	Andy Hessenthaler	Paul Scally	Andy Frampton	Vandanel	Medway Electrical & Mechanical Services
Hereford United	Richard O'Kelly	David Keyte	Stefan Stam	Admiral	Cargill
Macclesfield Town	Glyn Chamberlain	Mike Rance	Paul Morgan	adidas	Voi Jeans
Morecambe	Jim Bentley	Peter McGuigan	Will Haining	Puma	Bench
Northampton Town	Aidy Boothroyd	David Cardoza	John Johnson	Erreà	Jackson Grundy
Oxford United	Chris Wilder	Kelvin Thomas	Jake Wright	Nike	Bridle Insurance
Plymouth Argyle	Carl Fletcher	James Brent	Simon Walton	Puma	Bond Timber
Port Vale	Micky Adams	Vacant	Marc Richards	Vandanel	Harlequin Property
Rotherham United	Steve Evans	Tony Stewart	Ryan Cresswell	Puma	Parkgate Shopping
Shrewsbury Town	Graham Turner	Roland Wycherley	Ian Sharps	Joma	Greenhous
Southend United	Paul Sturrock	Ron Martin	Chris Barker	Nike	InsureandGo
Swindon Town	Paolo Di Canio	Jeremy Wray	Paul Caddis	Adidas	Samsung (H); FIFA 12 (A)
Torquay United	Martin Ling	Simon Baker	Lee Mansell	Vandanel	Sparkworld

==== Managerial changes ====
Team	Outgoing manager	Manner of departure	Date of vacancy	Position in table	Incoming manager	Date of appointment
Bristol Rovers	Dave Penney	Sacked	7 March 2011	Pre-season	Paul Buckle	30 May 2011
Swindon Town	Paul Hart	Sacked	28 April 2011	Pre-season	Paolo Di Canio	20 May 2011
Morecambe	Sammy McIlroy	Mutual consent	9 May 2011	Pre-season	Jim Bentley	13 May 2011
Barnet	Giuliano Grazioli	End of tenure as caretaker	13 May 2011	Pre-season	Lawrie Sanchez	13 May 2011
Torquay United	Paul Buckle	Signed by Bristol Rovers	30 May 2011	Pre-season	Martin Ling	13 June 2011
Bradford City	Peter Jackson	Resigned	25 August 2011	21st	Phil Parkinson	28 August 2011
Plymouth Argyle	Peter Reid	Sacked	18 September 2011	24th	Carl Fletcher	18 September 2011
Crewe Alexandra	Dario Gradi	Resigned	10 November 2011	18th	Steve Davis	10 November 2011
Northampton Town	Gary Johnson	Mutual consent	14 November 2011	20th	Aidy Boothroyd	30 November 2011
Bristol Rovers	Paul Buckle	Sacked	3 January 2012	19th	Mark McGhee	18 January 2012
Accrington Stanley	John Coleman	Signed by Rochdale	24 January 2012	10th	Paul Cook	13 February 2012
Hereford United	Jamie Pitman	Sacked	5 March 2012	21st	Richard O'Kelly	5 March 2012
Burton Albion	Paul Peschisolido	Sacked	17 March 2012	17th	Gary Rowett (caretaker); Kevin Poole (caretaker)	17 March 2012
Macclesfield	Gary Simpson	Mutual consent	18 March 2012	21st	Brian Horton	19 March 2012
Rotherham United	Andy Scott	Sacked	19 March 2012	11th	Steve Evans	9 April 2012
Crawley Town	Steve Evans	Signed by Rotherham United	9 April 2012	4th	Craig Brewster (caretaker)	9 April 2012
Barnet	Lawrie Sanchez	Sacked	16 April 2012	22nd	Martin Allen	16 April 2012
Macclesfield	Brian Horton	Resigned	30 April 2012	24th	Glyn Chamberlain	30 April 2012

== League table ==
A total of 24 teams contest the division: 18 sides remaining in the division from last season, four relegated from League One, and two promoted from Conference National.

Pos	Team	Pld	W	D	L	GF	GA	GD	Pts	Promotion, qualification or relegation
1	Swindon Town (C, P)	46	29	6	11	75	32	+43	93	Promotion to Football League One
2	Shrewsbury Town (P)	46	26	10	10	66	41	+25	88	Promotion to Football League One
3	Crawley Town (P)	46	23	15	8	76	54	+22	84	Promotion to Football League One
4	Southend United	46	25	8	13	77	48	+29	83	Qualification for League Two play-offs (Note: Four teams play for one spot and promotion to Football League One.)
5	Torquay United	46	23	12	11	63	50	+13	81	Qualification for League Two play-offs
6	Cheltenham Town	46	23	8	15	66	50	+16	77	Qualification for League Two play-offs
7	Crewe Alexandra (O, P)	46	20	12	14	67	59	+8	72	Qualification for League Two play-offs
8	Gillingham	46	20	10	16	79	62	+17	70	
9	Oxford United	46	17	17	12	59	48	+11	68	
10	Rotherham United	46	18	13	15	67	63	+4	67	
11	Aldershot Town	46	19	9	18	54	52	+2	66	
12	Port Vale	46	20	9	17	68	60	+8	59 (Note: On 9 March Port Vale were deducted ten points for entering administration.)	
13	Bristol Rovers	46	15	12	19	60	70	−10	57	
14	Accrington Stanley	46	14	15	17	54	66	−12	57	
15	Morecambe	46	14	14	18	63	57	+6	56	
16	AFC Wimbledon	46	15	9	22	62	78	−16	54	
17	Burton Albion	46	14	12	20	54	81	−27	54	
18	Bradford City	46	12	14	20	54	59	−5	50	
19	Dagenham & Redbridge	46	14	8	24	50	72	−22	50	
20	Northampton Town	46	12	12	22	56	79	−23	48	
21	Plymouth Argyle	46	10	16	20	47	64	−17	46	
22	Barnet	46	12	10	24	52	79	−27	46	
23	Hereford United (R)	46	10	14	22	50	70	−20	44	Relegation to the Conference Premier
24	Macclesfield Town (R)	46	8	13	25	39	64	−25	37	Relegation to the Conference Premier

Updated to match(es) played on 5 May 2012. Source: BBC Sport
Rules for classification: 1) Points; 2) Goal difference; 3) Number of goals scored
(C) Champions; (O) Play-off winners; (P) Promoted; (R) Relegated

== Play-offs ==
Semifinals
4	Southend United	0	2	2
7	Crewe Alexandra	1	2	3
5	Torquay United	0	1	1
6	Cheltenham Town	2	2	4

Final
6	Cheltenham Town	0
7	Crewe Alexandra	2

== Results ==
The fixtures for the League Two were released on 17 June 2011. The season started on 6 August 2011, and is scheduled to conclude on 5 May 2012.

Home \ Away	ACC	WIM	ALD	BAR	BRA	BRR	BRT	CHL	CRA	CRE	D&R	GIL	HER	MAC	MOR	NOR	OXF	PLY	PTV	ROT	SHR	STD	SWI	TOR
Accrington Stanley		2–1	3–2	0–3	1–0	2–1	2–1	0–1	0–1	0–2	3–0	4–3	2–1	4–0	1–1	2–1	0–2	0–4	2–2	1–1	1–1	1–2	0–2	3–1
AFC Wimbledon	0–2		1–2	1–1	3–1	2–3	4–0	4–1	2–5	1–3	2–1	3–1	1–1	2–1	1–1	0–3	0–2	1–2	3–2	1–2	3–1	1–4	1–1	2–0
Aldershot Town	0–0	1–1		4–1	1–0	1–0	2–0	1–0	0–1	3–1	1–1	1–2	1–0	1–2	1–0	0–1	0–3	0–0	1–2	2–2	1–0	2–0	2–1	0–1
Barnet	0–0	4–0	2–1		0–4	2–0	3–6	2–2	1–2	2–0	2–2	2–2	1–1	2–1	0–2	1–2	0–2	2–0	1–3	1–1	1–2	0–3	0–2	0–1
Bradford City	1–1	1–2	1–2	4–2		2–2	1–1	0–1	1–2	3–0	0–1	2–2	1–1	1–0	2–2	2–1	2–1	1–1	1–1	2–3	3–1	2–0	0–0	1–0
Bristol Rovers	5–1	1–0	0–1	0–2	2–1		7–1	1–3	0–0	2–5	2–0	2–2	0–0	0–0	2–1	2–1	0–0	2–3	0–3	5–2	1–0	1–0	1–1	1–2
Burton Albion	0–2	3–2	0–4	1–2	2–2	2–1		0–2	0–0	1–0	1–1	1–0	0–2	1–0	3–2	0–1	1–1	2–1	1–1	1–1	1–1	0–2	2–0	1–4
Cheltenham Town	4–1	0–0	2–0	2–0	3–1	0–2	2–0		3–1	0–1	2–1	0–3	0–0	2–0	1–2	2–2	0–0	2–1	2–0	1–0	0–0	3–0	1–0	0–1
Crawley Town	1–1	1–1	2–2	1–0	3–1	4–1	3–0	4–2		1–1	3–1	1–2	0–3	2–0	1–1	3–1	4–1	2–0	3–2	3–0	2–1	3–0	0–3	0–1
Crewe Alexandra	2–0	3–3	2–2	3–1	1–0	3–0	3–2	1–0	1–1		4–1	1–2	1–0	0–1	0–1	1–1	3–1	3–2	1–1	1–2	1–1	1–3	2–0	0–3
Dagenham & Redbridge	2–1	0–2	2–5	3–0	1–0	4–0	1–1	0–5	1–1	2–1		2–1	0–1	2–0	1–2	0–1	0–1	2–3	1–2	3–2	0–2	2–3	1–0	1–1
Gillingham	1–1	3–4	1–0	3–1	0–0	4–1	3–1	1–0	0–1	3–4	1–2		5–4	2–0	2–0	4–3	1–0	3–0	1–1	0–0	0–1	1–2	3–1	2–0
Hereford United	1–1	2–1	0–2	1–0	2–0	1–2	2–3	1–1	1–1	0–1	1–0	1–6		0–4	0–3	0–0	0–1	1–1	1–2	2–3	0–2	2–3	1–2	3–2
Macclesfield Town	1–1	4–0	0–1	0–0	1–0	0–0	0–2	1–3	2–2	2–2	0–1	0–0	2–2		1–1	3–1	1–1	1–1	2–1	0–0	1–3	0–2	2–0	1–2
Morecambe	1–2	1–2	2–0	0–1	1–1	2–3	2–2	3–1	6–0	1–2	1–2	2–1	0–1	1–0		1–2	0–0	2–2	0–0	3–3	0–1	1–0	0–1	1–2
Northampton Town	0–0	1–0	3–1	1–2	1–3	3–2	2–3	2–3	0–1	1–1	2–1	1–1	1–3	3–2	0–2		2–1	0–0	1–2	1–1	2–7	2–5	1–2	0–0
Oxford United	1–1	1–0	1–1	2–1	1–1	3–0	2–2	1–3	1–1	0–1	2–1	0–0	2–2	1–1	1–2	2–0		5–1	2–1	2–1	2–0	0–2	2–0	2–2
Plymouth Argyle	2–2	0–2	1–0	0–0	1–0	1–1	2–1	1–2	1–1	0–1	0–0	0–1	1–1	2–0	1–1	4–1	1–1		0–2	1–4	1–0	2–2	0–1	1–2
Port Vale	4–1	1–2	4–0	1–2	3–2	1–0	3–0	1–2	2–2	1–1	0–1	2–1	1–0	1–0	0–4	3–0	3–0	1–0		2–0	2–3	2–3	0–2	0–0
Rotherham United	1–0	1–0	2–0	2–2	3–0	0–1	0–1	1–0	1–2	1–1	3–1	3–0	1–0	4–2	3–2	1–1	1–0	1–0	0–1		1–1	0–4	1–2	0–1
Shrewsbury Town	1–0	0–0	1–1	3–2	1–0	1–0	1–0	2–0	2–1	2–0	1–0	2–0	3–1	1–0	2–0	1–1	2–2	1–1	1–0	3–1		2–1	2–1	2–0
Southend United	2–2	2–0	0–1	3–0	0–1	1–1	0–1	4–0	0–0	1–0	1–1	1–0	1–0	2–0	1–1	2–2	2–1	2–0	3–0	0–2	3–0		1–4	4–1
Swindon Town	2–0	2–0	2–0	4–0	0–0	0–0	2–0	1–0	3–0	3–0	4–0	2–0	3–3	1–0	3–0	1–0	1–2	1–0	5–0	3–2	2–1	2–0		2–0
Torquay United	1–0	4–0	1–0	1–0	1–2	2–2	2–2	2–2	1–3	1–1	1–0	2–5	2–0	3–0	1–1	1–0	0–0	3–1	2–1	3–3	1–0	0–0	1–0	

Updated to match(es) played on 5 May 2012. Source: The Football League
Legend: Blue = home team win; Yellow = draw; Red = away team win.

== Statistics ==
As of 14 April 2012

=== Top goalscorers ===
Rank	Player	Club	Goals
1	(England) Jack Midson	AFC Wimbledon	18
1	(England) Izale McLeod	Barnet	18
1	(England) Lewis Grabban	Rotherham United	18
1	(England) Adebayo Akinfenwa	Northampton Town	18
5	(England) Marc Richards	Port Vale	17
6	(England) Matt Harrold	Bristol Rovers	16
7	(England) Kevin Ellison	Morecambe	15
8	(Republic of Ireland) James Collins	Shrewsbury Town	14
8	(England) Nick Powell	Crewe Alexandra	14
10	(England) James Hanson	Bradford City	13
10	(England) Tyrone Barnett	Crawley Town	13
10	(Tunisia) Bilel Mohsni	Southend United	13
10	(England) Rene Howe	Torquay United	13

=== Top assists ===
Rank	Player	Club	Assists
1	(England) Ryan Hall	Southend United	19
2	(Scotland) Matt Ritchie	Swindon Town	14
3	(Scotland) Peter Leven	Oxford United	11
3	(England) Luke Rooney	Gillingham/Swindon Town	11
5	(England) Michael Jacobs	Northampton Town	10
5	(England) Kyel Reid	Bradford City	10
5	(England) Tom Pope	Port Vale	10
8	(Northern Ireland) Eunan O'Kane	Torquay United	9
8	(England) Mark Wright	Shrewsbury Town	9
8	(England) Danny Jackman	Gillingham	9

== Monthly awards ==
Month	Manager of the Month		Player of the Month		Notes
Month	Manager	Club	Player	Club	Notes
August	(England) Andy Scott	Rotherham United	(England) Mark Arber	Dagenham & Redbridge	
September	(Scotland) Paul Sturrock	Southend United	(England) Danny Carlton	Morecambe	
October	(Scotland) Steve Evans	Crawley Town	(England) Danny Hylton	Aldershot Town	
November	(England) Mark Yates	Cheltenham Town	(Northern Ireland) Billy Kee	Burton Albion	
December	(England) Phil Parkinson	Bradford City	(England) Bryan Hughes	Accrington	
January	(England) Martin Ling	Torquay United	(England) Mark Ellis	Torquay United	
February	(Italy) Paolo Di Canio	Swindon Town	(England) Paul Benson	Swindon Town	
March	(England) Martin Ling	Torquay United	(England) Lee Mansell	Torquay United	
April	(England) Graham Turner	Shrewsbury Town	(Tunisia) Bilel Mohsni	Southend United	
