= Bartłomiej Fogler =

Polish footballer

Personal information
- Date of birth: 7 February 1985 (age 41)
- Place of birth: Warsaw, Poland
- Height: 1.88 m (6 ft 2 in)
- Position: Goalkeeper

Youth career
- 2002–2005: Polonia Warsaw

Senior career*
Years	Team	Apps	(Gls)
2005–2007	Polonia Warsaw	2	(0)
2007–2010	Świt Nowy Dwór Mazowiecki	87	(0)
2010–2011	Crewe Alexandra	0	(0)
2011–2012	Port Talbot Town	9	(0)
2012	→ Bridgend Street (loan)		
2012–2015	Wembley		
2016–2018	PFC Victoria London		
2023	AFC Petersfield	7	(0)

International career
- Poland U15
- Poland U19
- Poland U21
- * Club domestic league appearances and goals as of 16:40, 7 February 2024 (UTC)

Bartłomiej Fogler (born 7 February 1985) is a Polish footballer who plays as a goalkeeper.

== Club career ==
Fogler began his career in his native Poland, beginning his senior career at hometown club Polonia Warsaw. Fogler made two first team appearances for the club, before departing for Świt Nowy Dwór Mazowiecki.

In July 2010, Fogler joined English club Crewe Alexandra on a monthly rolling contract. In December 2010, Fogler signed a contract until the end of the season. Fogler left the club at the end of the season, having not made an appearance for the club.

On 14 October 2011, Fogler signed for Welsh Premier League club Port Talbot Town after an injury to regular goalkeeper Kristian Rogers. In January 2012, following the return of Rogers to the Port Talbot starting line-up, Fogler was loaned to Bridgend Street until the end of the season.

In 2012, Fogler returned to England, to sign for Wembley.

In 2016, Fogler joined PFC Victoria London, a club for the Polish community in the United Kingdom.

In 2023, he made seven appearances for Hampshire Premier League Division One side AFC Petersfield.

== International career ==
Fogler represented Poland internationally at numerous youth levels.

== Honours ==
Świt Nowy Dwór Mazowiecki

- III liga Łódź–Masovian: 2008–09
