= Hamdi Razak =

French footballer (born 1985)

Personal information
- Date of birth: 8 October 1985 (age 41)
- Place of birth: France
- Position: Striker

Senior career*
| Years | Team | Apps | (Gls) |
- US Chantilly
| –2008 | FC Les Lilas | | |
| 2008– | Levallois SC | | |
- FC Igny
| 2009 | Swindon Town | 3 | (0) |
| 2009–2010 | Red Star | 7 | (0) |
| 2011–2014 | L'Entente SSG | | |
- * Club domestic league appearances and goals

Hamdi Razak (born 8 October 1985) is a French former professional footballer who played as a striker.

== Career ==
Born in France, Razak spent the majority of his career within the borders of Paris, playing for amateur clubs including Chantilly, FC Les Lilas, Levallois SC in 2008 and FC Igny.

He made several efforts to ply his trade outside France. Dutch Eerste Divisie club RBC Roosendaal offered Razak a trial which was unsuccessful for him.

in 2007 Razak spent some time on trial at Isthmian League Premier Division outfit Dover Athletic. Dover manager Andy Hessenthaler was keen to sign the Frenchman but Razak's wage demands were seen as unreasonable and deal was not concluded.

In January 2009, Swindon Town manager Danny Wilson offered Razak and Lecsinel Jean-François a chance to impress in the reserve fixture against Swansea City. Razak scored three goals in the 6–3 win. Both of the trial players earned contracts until the end of the 2008–09 season. Razak made his debut as a substitute in the 0–0 draw at Oldham Athletic.

Despite scoring in trial matches for both Crewe Alexandra and Yeovil Town he failed to earn a contract and returned to France with Red Star Saint-Ouen.
