= Glyn Chamberlain =

English football manager (born 1958)

Personal information
- Date of birth: 27 May 1958 (age 68)
- Place of birth: Chesterfield, England
- Position: Defender

Youth career
- Burnley

Senior career*
Years	Team	Apps	(Gls)
1974–1976	Burnley		
1976–1981	Chesterfield	18	(0)
1981–1982	Halifax Town	35	(0)
1982–1984	Kettering Town		
1984–1985	Buxton		
1985–1987	Hyde United	84	(1)
1986–1987	→ Macclesfield Town (loan)	1	(0)
- Gainsborough Trinity
- Droylsden

Managerial career
- 1994–1999: Newcastle Town
- 1999–2001: Congleton Town
- 2010–2012: Macclesfield Town (assistant)
- 2012: Macclesfield Town (caretaker)
- * Club domestic league appearances and goals

Glyn Chamberlain (born 27 May 1958) is an English former football manager whose last managerial position was for one game as caretaker manager at Macclesfield Town. He was appointed as recruitment consultant by Crewe Alexandra in April 2022.

Chamberlain played professionally at Burnley, Chesterfield, and Halifax Town He later played non-League football at Kettering Town, Buxton, Hyde United, Macclesfield Town, Gainsborough Trinity, and Droylsden

As a manager, he managed Newcastle Town and Congleton Town Alongside his managerial work at Congleton Town he worked as a scout at Fulham In 2001, he became full-time scout at Fulham, and in 2005 he became chief scout at Crewe Alexandra He left Crewe in 2009 to become scout at Burton Albion

In 2010, he was named Gary Simpson's new assistant manager at Macclesfield Town On 30 April 2012 he was named caretaker manager at Macclesfield Town following the departure of Brian Horton. However, Chamberlain and the Silkmen parted company shortly after the end of the 2011–12 season.

Following his departure from Maccelsfield Chamberlain returned to scouting and worked for Doncaster Rovers and Burnley before being appointed as chief scout of Cardiff City in March 2017. He was appointed as recruitment consultant by Crewe Alexandra in April 2022.
