= Adam Dugdale =

British footballer

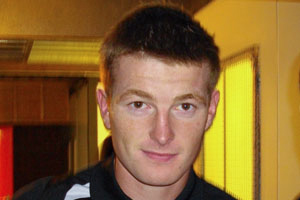

Personal information
- Date of birth: 12 September 1987 (age 39)
- Place of birth: Liverpool, England
- Position: Defender

Senior career*
Years	Team	Apps	(Gls)
2006–2007	Crewe Alexandra	0	(0)
2006	→ Accrington Stanley (loan)	2	(0)
2007	→ Southport (loan)	8	(1)
2007	Southport	2	(4)
2007–2008	Droylsden	48	(5)
2009	→ Hyde United (loan)	3	(0)
2009–2010	Barrow	24	(2)
2009–2010	→ AFC Telford United (loan)	6	(0)
2010	AFC Telford United	34	(6)
2010–2015	Crewe Alexandra	180	(5)
2013	→ Tranmere Rovers (loan)	4	(1)
2015	Tranmere Rovers	16	(0)
2015–2016	Morecambe	24	(0)
2016–2017	Eastleigh	18	(2)
2017–2018	Southport	15	(1)
Total		384	(27)
- * Club domestic league appearances and goals

Adam Dugdale (born 12 September 1987) is an English retired footballer who played as a defender

== Career ==
Liverpool-born Dugdale, is a product of Crewe Alexandra's youth academy, playing one first team game before being released in 2007. He then played in non-league with Southport, Droylsden, Barrow and AFC Telford, before rejoining Crewe on 23 June 2010, signing an initial six-month deal.

Dugdale signed for Tranmere Rovers on a one-month emergency loan deal on 30 August 2013. Some 16 months later, in January 2015, after over 100 league appearances for Crewe, he rejoined Rovers on a six-month deal. At the end of the season, that saw Tranmere Rovers relegate out of League Two, Dugdale was released by the club.

Following Dugdale's release from Tranmere, he signed for a League Two side Morecambe on a one-year deal.

Dugdale joined Eastleigh in June 2016. He left the club a year later by mutual consent.

== Honours ==
Crewe Alexandra

- Football League Two play-offs: 2012
