= Patrick Ada =

Cameroonian footballer (born 1985)

Personal information
- Full name: Patrick Ada Omgba
- Date of birth: 14 January 1985 (age 41)
- Place of birth: Yaoundé, Cameroon
- Position: Defender

Senior career*
Years	Team	Apps	(Gls)
2004–2005	Redbridge	19	(3)
2005	Barnet	14	(0)
2005–2006	St Albans City	36	(1)
2006–2007	Exeter City	17	(2)
2007	→ St Albans City (loan)	11	(0)
2007–2009	Histon	77	(5)
2009–2011	Crewe Alexandra	57	(3)
2011	Kilmarnock	3	(0)
2012	Burton Albion	9	(0)
2012	Ebbsfleet United	19	(0)
Total		262	(14)
- * Club domestic league appearances and goals

Patrick Omgba Ada (born 14 January 1985) is a Cameroonian former professional footballer and convicted rapist.

During his career, which lasted between 2004 and 2012, Ada played as a defender. He notably represented Kilmarnock in the Scottish Premier League, and played in the Football League for Barnet, Exeter City, Crewe Alexandra and Burton Albion. He also played in Non-league football with Redbridge, St Albans City, Histon and Ebbsfleet United.

Ada was released by Ebbsfleet in December 2012 after he was sentenced to five years in prison for rape.

== Career ==
Ada made 94 appearances over two years with Histon, helping them chase promotion.

He signed with Crewe Alexandra in the summer of 2009, making him Crewe's first signing in the summer transfer window. He was released from the club in May 2011.

On 21 June 2011, Ada signed for Scottish Premier League club Kilmarnock. Ada made his debut on 24 July 2011 at Tannadice in a 1–1 draw with Dundee United. On 30 August, it was announced that Kilmarnock would let Ada leave on a free transfer, in order to ease the club's wage bill.

On 23 February 2012, after training for a week with Burton Albion, Ada signed a contract until the end of the season with the League Two side. Ada joined Conference National side Ebbsfleet United in the summer of 2012 and went on to make 19 league appearances and played his final game on 4 December in a 4–2 home defeat by Cambridge United before being released after being jailed for rape.

== Personal life ==
Ada was arrested in March 2012, in the connection to an allegation of rape.

On 12 December Ada was sentenced to five years in prison after being convicted of raping a woman in Southwark, London on 1 March 2012.
