= Danny Shelley =

English footballer

Personal information
- Date of birth: 28 December 1990 (age 35)
- Place of birth: Endon, England
- Height: 6 ft 2 in (1.88 m)
- Position: Midfielder

Team information
- Current team: Leek Town

Youth career
- 2005–2008: Crewe Alexandra

Senior career*
Years	Team	Apps	(Gls)
2008–2012	Crewe Alexandra	73	(8)
2012–	Leek Town	34	(10)
- * Club domestic league appearances and goals as of 21:57, 23 September 2012 (UTC)

Daniel Steven Shelley (born 28 December 1990) is an English footballer who plays for Leek Town in the Northern Premier League after being released by Crewe Alexandra. Having been at the club since the age of 14, he made his full debut for the club in December 2008 and scored his first career goal in the FA Cup against Millwall. He was released along with three other first team members on 1 June 2012. After a number of unsuccessful trials he signed on non-contract terms with Leek Town in September 2012.
