= 2011–12 Burton Albion F.C. season =

Burton Albion
2011–12 season
- Chairman: Ben Robinson
- Manager: Paul Peschisolido (until 17 March); Gary Rowett (caretaker)
- Stadium: Pirelli Stadium
- League Two: 17th
- FA Cup: 1st Round (eliminated by Oldham Athletic)
- League Cup: 1st Round (eliminated by Burnley)
- Football League Trophy: 1st Round (eliminated by Sheffield United
- Top goalscorer: League: Billy Kee & Calvin Zola (12); All: Calvin Zola (14)
- Highest home attendance: 3,608 vs. Port Vale, 16 August 2011
- Lowest home attendance: 1,714 vs. Gillingham, 27 March 2012
- Average home league attendance: 2,809
Home colours	Away colours

The 2011–12 season was Burton Albion's third consecutive season in League Two.

== League table ==
Pos	Team	Pld	W	D	L	GF	GA	GD	Pts
15	Morecambe	46	14	14	18	63	57	+6	56
16	AFC Wimbledon	46	15	9	22	62	78	−16	54
17	Burton Albion	46	14	12	20	54	81	−27	54
18	Bradford City	46	12	14	20	54	59	−5	50
19	Dagenham & Redbridge	46	14	8	24	50	72	−22	50

Updated to match(es) played on 5 May 2012. Source: BBC Sport
Rules for classification: 1) Points; 2) Goal difference; 3) Number of goals scored

== Squad statistics ==
=== Appearances and goals ===
No.	Pos	Nat	Player	Total		League Two		FA Cup		League Cup		FL Trophy	
No.	Pos	Nat	Player	Apps	Goals	Apps	Goals	Apps	Goals	Apps	Goals	Apps	Goals
3	DF	(England) ENG	Aaron Webster	36	3	33+2	3	0+0	0	1+0	0	0+0	0
4	DF	(England) ENG	Nathan Stanton	25	0	23+0	0	1+0	0	1+0	0	0+0	0
5	DF	(Wales) WAL	Tony James	32	0	29+1	0	0+1	0	1+0	0	0+0	0
6	MF	(Ireland) EIR	John McGrath	34	0	28+3	0	1+0	0	0+1	0	1+0	0
8	DF	(England) ENG	Andrew Corbett	36	0	31+2	0	1+0	0	1+0	0	1+0	0
9	FW	(England) ENG	Justin Richards	37	12	28+7	11	0+0	0	1+0	0	1+0	1
10	FW	(Democratic Republic of the Congo) COD	Calvin Zola	39	14	34+2	12	1+0	1	1+0	1	1+0	0
11	MF	(England) ENG	Chris Palmer	36	3	16+18	3	0+1	0	1+0	0	0+0	0
12	FW	(Tanzania) TAN	Adi Yussuf	17	1	1+14	1	0+0	0	0+1	0	0+1	0
13	MF	(Jamaica) JAM	Cleveland Taylor	33	3	23+8	2	1+0	0	1+0	1	0+0	0
15	DF	(England) ENG	Ryan Austin	41	0	34+5	0	1+0	0	0+0	0	1+0	0
17	MF	(England) ENG	Jimmy Phillips	36	0	21+12	0	1+0	0	0+1	0	1+0	0
18	FW	(England) ENG	Greg Pearson	12	0	6+6	0	0+0	0	0+0	0	0+0	0
19	MF	(Democratic Republic of the Congo) COD	Jacques Maghoma	39	5	32+4	4	1+0	0	1+0	1	1+0	0
20	DF	(England) ENG	Danny Blanchett	16	0	9+5	0	1+0	0	0+0	0	1+0	0
21	MF	(Switzerland) SUI	Andres Gurrieri	14	0	6+7	0	0+1	0	0+0	0	0+0	0
22	MF	(England) ENG	Jack Dyer	18	1	16+1	1	0+0	0	0+0	0	1+0	0
23	GK	(England) ENG	Ross Atkins	48	0	45+0	0	1+0	0	1+0	0	1+0	0
26	MF	(England) ENG	Adam Bolder	46	3	41+3	3	1+0	0	1+0	0	0+0	0
29	FW	(Northern Ireland) NIR	Billy Kee	20	12	14+6	12	0+0	0	0+0	0	0+0	0
31	MF	(Northern Ireland) NIR	Seanan Clucas	2	0	1+1	0	0+0	0	0+0	0	0+0	0
33	DF	(Cameroon) CMR	Patrick Ada	9	0	5+4	0	0+0	0	0+0	0	0+0	0
Players featured for Burton but left before the end of the season:
7	DF	(Jamaica) JAM	Darren Moore	5	0	1+3	0	0+0	0	0+0	0	1+0	0
24	DF	(England) ENG	Kevin Amankwaah	8	0	8+0	0	0+0	0	0+0	0	0+0	0
Players played for Burton on loan who have returned to their parent club:
2	DF	(England) ENG	Callum Driver	8	1	8+0	1	0+0	0	0+0	0	0+0	0
7	MF	(England) ENG	Lionel Ainsworth	7	0	4+3	0	0+0	0	0+0	0	0+0	0
14	MF	(England) ENG	Jason Banton	1	0	0+1	0	0+0	0	0+0	0	0+0	0
14	MF	(Wales) WAL	Lee Lucas	1	0	1+0	0	0+0	0	0+0	0	0+0	0
24	MF	(Ireland) EIR	Matty Harriott	4	0	3+1	0	0+0	0	0+0	0	0+0	0
25	DF	(England) ENG	Tom Parkes	3	0	3+0	0	0+0	0	0+0	0	0+0	0
30	GK	(England) ENG	Adam Legzdins	1	0	1+0	0	0+0	0	0+0	0	0+0	0

=== Top scorers ===
Place	Position	Nation	Number	Name	League Two	FA Cup	League Cup	FL Trophy	Total
1	FW	(Democratic Republic of the Congo)	10	Calvin Zola	12	1	1	0	14
2	FW	(Northern Ireland)	29	Billy Kee	12	0	0	0	12
=	FW	(England)	9	Justin Richards	11	0	0	1	12
4	MF	(Democratic Republic of the Congo)	19	Jacques Maghoma	4	0	1	0	5
5	DF	(England)	3	Aaron Webster	3	0	0	0	3
=	MF	(England)	11	Chris Palmer	3	0	0	0	3
=	MF	(England)	26	Adam Bolder	3	0	0	0	3
=	MF	(Jamaica)	13	Cleveland Taylor	2	0	1	0	3
9	FW	(Tanzania)	12	Adi Yussuf	1	0	0	0	1
=	MF	(England)	22	Jack Dyer	1	0	0	0	1
=	DF	(England)	2	Callum Driver	1	0	0	0	1
=	–		–	own goals	1	0	0	0	1
				TOTALS	54	1	3	1	59

=== Disciplinary record ===
Number	Nation	Position	Name	League Two		FA Cup		League Cup		FL Trophy		Total	
Number	Nation	Position	Name	Yellow card	Red card	Yellow card	Red card	Yellow card	Red card	Yellow card	Red card	Yellow card	Red card
26	(England)	MF	Adam Bolder	10	0	0	0	1	0	0	0	11	0
4	(England)	DF	Nathan Stanton	8	0	0	0	0	0	0	0	8	0
8	(England)	DF	Andrew Corbett	7	1	0	0	0	0	0	0	7	1
6	(Republic of Ireland)	MF	John McGrath	6	0	0	0	0	0	1	0	7	0
3	(England)	DF	Aaron Webster	5	1	0	0	1	0	0	0	6	1
5	(Wales)	DF	Tony James	5	0	1	0	0	0	0	0	6	0
17	(England)	MF	Jimmy Phillips	5	0	0	0	0	0	0	0	5	0
15	(England)	DF	Ryan Austin	4	1	0	1	0	0	0	0	4	2
22	(England)	MF	Jack Dyer	4	0	0	0	0	0	0	0	4	0
10	(Democratic Republic of the Congo)	FW	Calvin Zola	4	0	0	0	0	0	0	0	4	0
6	(England)	DF	Tom Parkes	3	1	0	0	0	0	0	0	3	1
19	(Democratic Republic of the Congo)	MF	Jacques Maghoma	3	0	0	0	0	0	0	0	3	0
29	(Northern Ireland)	FW	Billy Kee	3	0	0	0	0	0	0	0	3	0
13	(Jamaica)	MF	Cleveland Taylor	3	0	0	0	0	0	0	0	3	0
33	(Cameroon)	DF	Patrick Ada	2	1	0	0	0	0	0	0	2	1
20	(England)	DF	Danny Blanchett	2	0	0	0	0	0	0	0	2	0
9	(England)	FW	Justin Richards	1	0	0	0	0	0	1	0	2	0
23	(England)	GK	Ross Atkins	1	0	0	0	0	0	0	0	1	0
7	(Jamaica)	DF	Darren Moore	1	0	0	0	0	0	0	0	1	0
2	(England)	DF	Callum Driver	1	0	0	0	0	0	0	0	1	0
21	(Switzerland)	MF	Andres Gurrieri	1	0	0	0	0	0	0	0	1	0
11	(England)	MF	Chris Palmer	1	0	0	0	0	0	0	0	1	0
			TOTALS	80	5	1	1	2	0	2	0	85	6

== Club ==
=== Coaching and Medical Staff ===
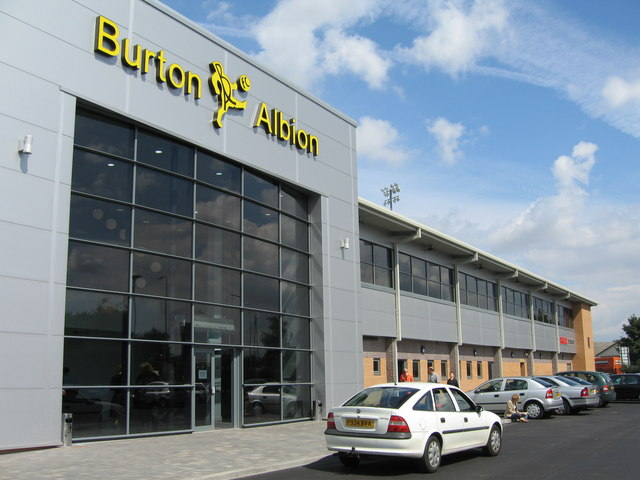
The Pirelli Stadium.

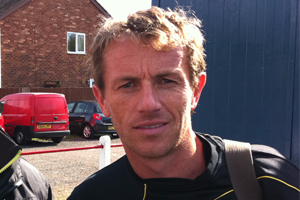
Gary Rowett is named as caretaker manager.

Position	Staff
Caretaker Manager	(England) Gary Rowett
Player/Goalkeeping Coach	(England) Kevin Poole
Youth team manager	(England) Mark Sale
Head Physiotherapist	(England) James Rowland
Kit Manager	(England) Ray 'Rocky' Hudson

Last updated 17 September 2012.
Includes staff registered with club on 5 May 2012.

=== Managerial change ===
Outgoing manager	Manner of departure	Date of vacancy	Position in table	Incoming managers	Date of appointment
(England) Paul Peschisolido	Sacked	17 March 2012	17th	(England) Kevin Poole (England) Gary Rowett	17 March 2012

Following Burton's victory over Northampton Town on 26 December 2011, the club then went 14 consecutive games without a victory. This prompted chairman Ben Robinson to sack Paul Peschisolido on 17 March 2012. Gary Rowett and Kevin Poole were put in temporary charge until a new manager could be found. Rowett was subsequently put in charge of the club on a permanent basis on 11 May 2012 in time for the new season.

=== Players ===
As of 5 May 2012.

No.	Name	Nationality	Position	Date Of Birth (Age)	Previous club	Since	Apps	Goals	Ends	Transfer Fee	Notes
Goalkeepers
1	Kevin Poole^{1}	(England)	GK	21 July 1963 (age 63)	Derby County	2006	133	0	June 2012	Free	
23	Ross Atkins	(England)	GK	3 November 1989 (age 37)	Derby County	2011	48	0	June 2012	Loan	
32	James Wren	(England)	GK	26 June 1993 (age 33)	Walsall	2011	0	0	June 2012	Free	
Defenders
3	Aaron Webster	(England)	LB	19 December 1980 (age 45)	Youth	1998	577	100	June 2012	N/A	
4	Nathan Stanton	(England)	CB	4 June 1981 (age 45)	Rochdale	2010	52	0	June 2012	Free	
5	Tony James	(Wales)	CB	9 October 1978 (age 48)	Weymouth	2007	164	1	June 2012	Free	
8	Andrew Corbett	(England)	RB	20 February 1982 (age 44)	Nuneaton Borough	2003	358	12	June 2013	Nominal	
15	Ryan Austin	(England)	CB	15 November 1984 (age 42)	Crewe Alexandra	2005	233	7	June 2012	Free	
20	Danny Blanchett	(England)	LB	6 May 1987 (age 39)	Crewe Alexandra	2011	16	0	June 2012	Free	
32	Kristian Ramsey-Dixon	(England)	CB	23 August 1989 (age 37)	Continental Star	2012	0	0	June 2012	Free	
33	Patrick Ada	(Cameroon)	CB	14 January 1985 (age 41)	Kilmarnock	2012	9	0	June 2012	Free	
Midfielders
6	John McGrath	(Republic of Ireland)	CM	27 March 1980 (age 46)	Tamworth	2007	240	19	June 2013	Free	^{2}
11	Chris Palmer	(England)	LW	16 October 1983 (age 43)	Gillingham	2011	36	3	June 2013	Free	
13	Cleveland Taylor	(Jamaica)	RW	9 September 1983 (age 43)	St Johnstone	2011	57	7	June 2013	Free	
17	Jimmy Phillips	(England)	LW/RW	20 September 1989 (age 37)	Stoke City	2009	90	2	June 2012	Free	
19	Jacques Maghoma	(Democratic Republic of the Congo)	CM	23 October 1987 (age 39)	Tottenham Hotspur	2009	111	14	June 2013	Free	
21	Andres Gurrieri	(Argentina)	LW/RW	3 September 1989 (age 37)	Sud America	2011	14	0	June 2012	Free	
22	Jack Dyer	(England)	CM	11 December 1991 (age 34)	Aston Villa	2010	23	1	June 2012	Free	
26	Adam Bolder	(England)	CM	25 October 1980 (age 46)	Millwall	2010	77	4	June 2012	Free	
Forwards
9	Justin Richards	(England)	FW	16 October 1980 (age 46)	Port Vale	2011	37	12	June 2013	Free	
10	Calvin Zola	(Democratic Republic of the Congo)	FW	31 December 1984 (age 41)	Crewe Alexandra	2011	58	18	June 2013	Free	
12	Adi Yussuf	(Tanzania)	FW	3 October 1992 (age 34)	Leicester City	2011	17	1	June 2012	Free	
18	Greg Pearson	(England)	FW	3 April 1985 (age 41)	Bishops Stortford	2008	137	46	June 2012	Undisclosed	
25	Evan Garnett	(England)	FW	14 August 1994 (age 32)	Youth	2012	0	0	June 2013	N/A	
29	Billy Kee	(Northern Ireland)	FW	1 December 1990 (age 35)	Torquay United	2011	20	12	June 2013	Undisclosed	^{3}
Players Left Before End Of Season
2	Paul Boertien	(England)	LB	20 January 1979 (age 47)	Walsall	2009	54	1	June 2012	Free	
2	Callum Driver	(England)	RB	23 October 1992 (age 34)	West Ham	2012	8	1	March 2012	Loan	
7	Darren Moore	(Jamaica)	CB	15 January 1992 (age 34)	Barnsley	2010	42	0	June 2012	Free	
7	Lionel Ainsworth	(England)	LW/RW	1 October 1987 (age 39)	Shrewsbury Town	2012	7	0	April 2012	Loan	
14	James Ellison	(England)	FW	25 October 1992 (age 34)	Liverpool	2010	3	0	June 2012	Free	
14	Lee Lucas	(Wales)	CM	10 June 1992 (age 34)	Swansea City	2012	1	0	May 2012	Loan	
16	Jason Banton	(England)	RW	15 December 1992 (age 33)	Leicester City	2011	1	0	October 2011	Loan	
16	Chris Riggott	(England)	CB	1 September 1980 (age 46)	Derby County	2012	0	0	June 2012	Free	
24	Kevin Amankwaah	(England)	CB	19 May 1982 (age 44)	Swindon Town	2011	8	0	January 2012	Free	
24	Matty Harriott	(England)	CM	23 September 1992 (age 34)	Sheffield United	2012	4	0	March 2012	Loan	
25	Tom Parkes	(England)	CB	15 January 1992 (age 34)	Leicester City	2011	31	1	January 2012	Loan	
30	Adam Legzdins	(England)	GK	28 November 1986 (age 39)	Derby County	2012	52	0	April 2012	Loan	^{4}
31	Bradley Munn	(England)	CM	28 June 1993 (age 33)	Youth	2011	0	0	January 2012	N/A	
31	Seanan Clucas	(Northern Ireland)	CM	8 November 1992 (age 34)	Preston North End	2012	2	0	May 2012	Loan	

Source: Burton Albion, Soccerbase
Ordered by position then squad number.
Appearances (starts and substitute appearances) and goals include those in competitive matches in The Football League, The Football Conference, FA Cup, League Cup, Football League Trophy, FA Trophy and Conference League Cup.
^{1}Player/Goalkeeping coach. Oldest registered player in The Football League.
^{2}Club Captain.
^{3}Undisclosed fee reported by the Burton Mail to be £20K.
^{4}Appearances include previous spell with club in 2010–11

=== Kit ===
Supplier: TAG Leisure
Sponsor(s): Mr. Cropper

Home	Away

Last updated: 17 September 2012.
Source: Burton Albion Club Shop

Burton's away kit was retained from the previous season, as was the Mr. Cropper sponsorship brand. TAG Leisure continue to manufacture the club's matchday and training attire. The new home kit was unveiled on 15 July before the pre-season friendly with Derby County. Following 16 years of plain yellow shirts, it marks a return to the traditional black and yellow stripes that had been worn by the club from its foundation through to the mid-1990s. The kit will be used for all club competitions and will remain in use until the end of the 2012–13 league season.

=== Other information ===
Chairman	(England) Ben Robinson
Ground (capacity and dimensions)	Pirelli Stadium (6,912 / 110x72 metres)

Updated to match played 13 September 2012
Source: Burton Albion F.C.

== Results ==
=== Pre-season friendlies ===
16 July 2011	Burton Albion	1–3	Derby County	Pirelli Stadium
15:00	Hamilton 7'		S. Davies 19', 38' (pen.); B. Davies 59'	Attendance: 4,135

19 July 2011	Rocester	2–5	Burton Albion	Hillsfield
19:45	McMahon 24', 66'		Zola 3', 63' (pen.); Phillips 38', 75'; Garnett 88'	Attendance: 221

19 July 2011	Alfreton Town	1–3	Burton Albion	North Street
19:45	Jarman 62'		Mason-Hughes 64', 78'; Seaton 74'	Attendance: 346

23 July 2011	Tamworth	4–0	Burton Albion	The Lamb Ground
15:00	Cain 10'; Shariff 30'; MacDonald 70'; Patterson 85'			Attendance: 832

26 July 2011	Solihull Moors	0–1	Burton Albion	Damson Park
19:30			Yussef 15'

27 July 2011 Bass Charity Vase	Burton Albion	2–1	Derby County	Pirelli Stadium
19:00	Pearson 28'; Zola 68'		Witham 57'	Attendance: 1,023

30 July 2011	AFC Telford United	1–1	Burton Albion	New Bucks Head
15:00	Farrell 58'		Phillips 76'	Attendance: 712; Referee: A. Horton

=== League Two ===
6 August 2011 1	Torquay United	2–2	Burton Albion	Plainmoor, Torquay
15:00	Howe 59'; Mansell 81' (yellow card) 70'	BBC Report; BAFC Report	Richards 49', 53'; Stanton (yellow card) 21'; Parkes (yellow card) 64' (yellow-red card) 83'; Corbett (yellow card) 89'	Attendance: 3,142; Referee: Mr. D. McDermid

13 August 2011 2	Burton Albion	1–1	Shrewsbury Town	Pirelli Stadium
15:00	Zola 14' (yellow card) 64'; Maghoma (yellow card) 24'; Bolder (yellow card) 60'; Corbett (yellow card) 72'	BBC Report; BAFC Report	Gornell 83'; Ainsworth (yellow card) 70'	Attendance: 2,989; Referee: Mr. D. Mohareb

16 August 2011 3	Burton Albion	1–1	Port Vale	Pirelli Stadium
19:45	Webster 23'; Corbett (yellow card) 81'; McGrath (yellow card) 85'; James (yellow card) 90+3'	BBC Report; BAFC Report	Loft 40'	Attendance: 3,608; Referee: Mr. G. Salisbury

20 August 2011 4	Southend United	0–1	Burton Albion	Roots Hall, Southend
15:00	Kalala (yellow card) 23'	BBC Report; BAFC Report	Zola 30'; Maghoma (yellow card) 76'; Blanchett (yellow card) 83'; Bolder (yellow card) 88'; Atkins (yellow card) 90+3'	Attendance: 4,794; Referee: Mr. P. Tierney

27 August 2011 5	Accrington Stanley	2–1	Burton Albion	Crown Ground, Accrington
15:00	Winnard 72'; Fletcher 81'	BBC Report; BAFC Report	Richards 39'; Bolder (yellow card) 71'	Attendance: 1,362; Referee: Mr. G. Eltringham

3 September 2011 6	Burton Albion	2–1	Plymouth Argyle	Pirelli Stadium
15:00	Richards 45+2'; Zola 57'	BBC Report; BAFC Report	Atkinson 90+1'; Berry (yellow card) 8'; Hitchcock (yellow card) 26'; Fletcher (yellow card) 45'; Walton (yellow card) 62'	Attendance: 3,042; Referee: Mr. A. Madley

10 September 2011 7	Oxford United	2–2	Burton Albion	Kassam Stadium, Oxford
15:00	Potter 45+2'; Leven 52'; Heslop (yellow card) 41'	BBC Report; BAFC Report	Richards 55' (pen.), 66'; Webster (yellow card) 31'	Attendance: 8,043; Referee: Mr. A. Woolmer

13 September 2011 8	Burton Albion	1–0	Crewe Alexandra	Pirelli Stadium
19:45	Richards 34'	BBC Report; BAFC Report		Attendance: 2,246; Referee: Mr. D. Drysdale

17 September 2011 9	Burton Albion	2–0	Swindon Town	Pirelli Stadium
15:00	Kee 21'; Maghoma 47'; Bolder (yellow card) 23'	BBC Report; BAFC Report	Kerrouche (yellow card) 73'; McCormack (yellow card) 85'; Smith (yellow card) 90+3'	Attendance: 3,320; Referee: Mr. R. Lewis

24 September 2011 10	Gillingham	3–1	Burton Albion	KRBS Priestfield Stadium, Gillingham
15:00	Kedwell 20', 50'; Nouble 49'; Frampton (yellow card) 90'	BBC Report; BAFC Report	Kee 40'; Webster (yellow card) 45+3' (yellow-red card) 60'; Maghoma (yellow card) 60'; Austin (yellow card) 18' (yellow-red card) 79'	Attendance: 4,946; Referee: Mr. G. Sutton

1 October 2011 11	Burton Albion	2–2	Bradford City	Pirelli Stadium
15:00	Kee 38'; Richards 45+3' (pen.); Zola (yellow card) 58'	BBC Report; BAFC Report	Reid 6'; Hanson 16'; Reed (yellow card) 53'	Attendance: 2,925; Referee: Mr. P. Ilderton

8 October 2011 12	Rotherham United	0–1	Burton Albion	Don Valley Stadium, Sheffield
15:00	Harrison (yellow card) 32'	BBC Report; BAFC Report	Richards 8'; Bolder (yellow card) 64'; Phillips (yellow card) 67'; Blanchett (yellow card) 90+6'	Attendance: 3,645; Referee: Mr. A. Haines

14 October 2011 13	Burton Albion	0–2	Cheltenham Town	Pirelli Stadium
19:45	James (yellow card) 25'	BBC Report; BAFC Report	Low 46'; Spencer 64'; Jombati (yellow card) 38'	Attendance: 2,701; Referee: Mr. S. Mathieson

22 October 2011 14	Burton Albion	2–1	Bristol Rovers	Pirelli Stadium
15:00	Taylor 27'; Kee 35'; James (yellow card) 4'	BBC Report; BAFC Report	Harrold 14'	Attendance: 3,094; Referee: Mr. D. Whitestone

29 October 2011 15	Barnet	3–6	Burton Albion	Underhill Stadium, Barnet
15:00	McLeod 39'; Holmes 55'; Deering 88' (yellow card) 66'; Uddin (yellow card) 60'; Kamdjo (yellow card) 64'	BBC Report; BAFC Report	Kee 7', 31', 62'; Yussuf 74'; Dyer 84'; Zola 90+4'; James (yellow card) 20'	Attendance: 1,745; Referee: Mr. G. Ward

1 November 2011 16	Aldershot Town	2–0	Burton Albion	Recreation Ground, Aldershot
19:45	McGlashan 38'; Guttridge 43'; Hylton (yellow card) 65'	BBC Report; BAFC Report	Webster (yellow card) 5'; James (yellow card) 33'; Moore (yellow card) 63'; McGrath (yellow card) 90+1'	Attendance: 3,713; Referee: Mr. C. Berry

5 November 2011 17	Burton Albion	1–0	Macclesfield Town	Pirelli Stadium
15:00	Kee 11' (yellow card) 23'; Corbett (yellow card) 54'; Austin (yellow card) 65'; Bolder (yellow card) 84'	BBC Report; BAFC Report	Mukendi (red card) 47'	Attendance: 2,698; Referee: Mr. B. Malone

19 November 2011 18	Hereford United	2–3	Burton Albion	Edgar Street, Hereford
15:00	Purdie 19' (pen.) (yellow card) 54'; Barkhuizen 34'	BBC Report; BAFC Report	Zola 24'; Webster 90+1'; Kee 90+3'; Stanton (yellow card) 13'; McGrath (yellow card) 86'	Attendance: 2,136; Referee: Mr. A. Haines

26 November 2011 19	Burton Albion	3–2	AFC Wimbledon	Pirelli Stadium
15:00	Kee 14', 29'; Bolder 62'	BBC Report; BAFC Report	Moore 45'; Webster 82' (o.g.)	Attendance: 3,282; Referee: Mr. S. Tanner

10 December 2011 20	Crawley Town	3–0	Burton Albion	Broadfield Stadium, Crawley
15:00	Davis 22' (yellow card) 90+5'; Webster 56' (o.g.); Tubbs 83'	BBC Report; BAFC Report	Bolder (yellow card) 10'	Attendance: 3,001; Referee: Mr. C. Pawson

17 December 2011 21	Burton Albion	1–1	Dagenham & Redbridge	Pirelli Stadium
15:00	Zola 54'; Stanton (yellow card) 63'	BBC Report; BAFC Report	Spillane 26'; Ogogo (red card) 60'; Montaño (yellow card) 67'	Attendance: 2,658; Referee: Mr. S. Lewis

26 December 2011 22	Northampton	2–3	Burton Albion	Sixfields Stadium, Northampton
15:00	Berahino 1'; Jacobs 12' (pen.); Johnson (red card) 18'	BBC Report; BAFC Report	Taylor 2'; Palmer 61'; Richards 88' (pen.); McGrath (yellow card) 11'; Kee (yellow card) 90+1'	Attendance: 5,044; Referee: Mr. K. Wright

31 December 2011 23	Morecambe	2–2	Burton Albion	Globe Arena, Morecambe
13:00	Alessandra 31'; McDonald 68'; Fleming (yellow card) 34'; Price (yellow card) 45'; Fenton (yellow card) 66'; Haining (yellow card) 74'	BBC Report	Kee 38'; Zola 53'; McGrath (yellow card) 29'; Kee (yellow card) 57'; Webster (yellow card) 62'	Attendance: 1,810; Referee: Mr. M. Brown

2 January 2012 24	Burton Albion	0–2	Hereford United	Pirelli Stadium
15:00	Corbett (yellow card) 29' (yellow-red card) 64'	BBC Report; BAFC Report	Evans 23'; Arquin 78'; Green (yellow card) 29'; Barkhuizen (yellow card) 51'	Attendance: 3,322; Referee: Mr. D. Webb

6 January 2012 25	Burton Albion	0–2	Accrington Stanley	Pirelli Stadium
19:45	Taylor (yellow card) 77'	BBC Report; BAFC Report	McIntyre 31'; Austin 65' (o.g.); Nsiala (yellow card) 27'	Attendance: 2,486; Referee: Mr. J. Waugh

14 January 2012 26	Plymouth Argyle	2–1	Burton Albion	Home Park, Plymouth
15:00	Walton 47', 89' (pen.) (yellow card) 39'	BBC Report; BAFC Report	Zola 73'	Attendance: 6,082; Referee: Mr. J. Adcock

21 January 2012 27	Bradford City	1–1	Burton Albion	Coral Windows Stadium, Bradford
15:00	Ravenhill (yellow card) 29'; Davies 43'	BBC Report; BAFC Report	Stanton (yellow card) 5'; Palmer 85'	Attendance: 9,744; Referee: Mr. L. Collins

29 January 2012 28	Burton Albion	1–1	Oxford United	Pirelli Stadium
15:00	Bolder 13'; Austin (yellow card) 82'	BBC Report; BAFC Report	Constable (yellow card) 44'; Potter 59'; Davis (yellow card) 68'; Johnson (yellow card) 89'	Attendance: 3,189; Referee: Mr. A. Haines

4 February 2012	Swindon Town	P–P	Burton Albion	County Ground, Swindon
15:00		Report

11 February 2012	Burton Albion	P–P	Gillingham	Pirelli Stadium
15:00		Report

14 February 2012 29	Crewe Alexandra	3–2	Burton Albion	Alexandra Stadium, Crewe
19:45	Shelley 30'; Westwood 55'; Murphy 87'; Martin (yellow card) 90+1'	BBC Report; BAFC Report	McGrath (yellow card) 25'; Driver 57'; Stanton (yellow card) 66'; Zola 90'	Attendance: 3,157; Referee: Mr. P. Gibbs

18 February 2012 30	Burton Albion	1–1	Rotherham United	Pirelli Stadium
15:00	Zola 40'; Dyer (yellow card) 42'	BBC Report; BAFC Report	Harrad 55'; Harrison (yellow card) 72'; Revell (yellow card) 84'	Attendance: 3,313; Referee: Mr. G. Eltringham

25 February 2012 31	Cheltenham Town	2–0	Burton Albion	Abbey Business Stadium, Cheltenham
15:00	McGlashan 5', 73'	BBC Report; BAFC Report	Dyer (yellow card) 20'; Gurrieri (yellow card) 30'; Ada (yellow card) 53' (yellow-red card) 62'; Driver (yellow card) 90+3'	Attendance: 2,935; Referee: Mr. C. Berry

28 February 2012 32	Swindon Town	2–0	Burton Albion	County Ground, Swindon
19:45	Murray 53'; Benson 58'; Cibocchi (yellow card) 34'	BBC Report; BAFC Report	Dyer (yellow card) 24'; Phillips (yellow card) 79'	Attendance: 7,261; Referee: Mr. F. Graham

3 March 2012 33	Burton Albion	0–2	Southend United	Pirelli Stadium
15:00		BBC Report; BAFC Report	Martin 60'; Harris 75'; Phillips (yellow card) 54'; Grant (yellow card) 28'	Attendance: 2,424; Referee: Mr. M. Russell

6 March 2012 34	Port Vale	3–0	Burton Albion	Vale Park, Burslem
19:45	Richards 43'; Dodds 86', 88'; Taylor (yellow card) 10'; Loft (yellow card) 41'	BBC Report; BAFC Report	Phillips (yellow card) 43'	Attendance: 5,197; Referee: Mr. S. Mathieson

10 March 2012 35	Shrewsbury Town	1–0	Burton Albion	Greenhous Meadow, Shrewsbury
15:00	Sharps 51'	BBC Report; BAFC Report	Taylor (yellow card) 63'; Phillips (yellow card) 87'; Bolder (yellow card) 90+2'	Attendance: 5,840; Referee: Mr. N. Miller

17 March 2012 36	Burton Albion	1–4	Torquay United	Pirelli Stadium
15:00	Richards 69'; Dyer (yellow card) 72'	BBC Report; BAFC Report	Stevens 7'; Lathrope (yellow card) 29'; Mansell 36'; Howe 82'; Atieno 87'	Attendance: 2,397; Referee: Mr. T. Bates

20 March 2012 37	Burton Albion	0–1	Northampton Town	Pirelli Stadium
19:45		BBC Report; BAFC Report	Langmead 90'; Jacobs (yellow card) 64'	Attendance: 2,692; Referee: Mr. S. Rushton

24 March 2012 38	AFC Wimbledon	4–0	Burton Albion	The Cherry Red Records Stadium, Kingston upon Thames
15:00	Moore 9'; Hatton (yellow card) 42'; Moncur 75'; Moore (yellow card) 84' (goal) 90+3'; Harrison 90+1'	BBC Report; BAFC Report	Bolder (yellow card) 45+1'	Attendance: 3,819; Referee: Rob Lewis

27 March 2012 39	Burton Albion	1–0	Gillingham	Pirelli Stadium
19:45	Fish 54' (o.g.); Stanton (yellow card) 44'	BBC Report; BAFC Report	Martin (yellow card) 66'	Attendance: 1,714; Referee: Mr. D. Coote

31 March 2012 40	Burton Albion	0–0	Crawley Town	Pirelli Stadium
15:00	Corbett (yellow card) 69'	BBC Report; BAFC Report	McFadzean (yellow card) 72'; Watt (yellow card) 75'	Attendance: 2,572; Referee: Mr. R. East

6 April 2012 41	Dagenham & Redbridge	1–1	Burton Albion	London Borough of Barking & Dagenham Stadium, Dagenham
15:00	Woodall 88'	BBC Report; BAFC Report	Maghoma 48'; Webster (yellow card) 24'; Phillips (yellow card) 66'	Attendance: 2,035; Referee: Mr. G. Ward

9 April 2012 42	Burton Albion	3–2	Morecambe	Pirelli Stadium
15:00	Bolder 6' (yellow card) 56'; Webster 39'; Richards (yellow card) 45'; Phillips (yellow card) 84'; Palmer 87'; Zola (yellow card) 90+3'	BBC Report; BAFC Report	Burrow 45+3'; Carlton 49' (yellow card) 66'	Attendance: 2,329; Referee: Mr. L. Collins

14 April 2012 43	Bristol Rovers	7–1	Burton Albion	Memorial Stadium, Bristol
15:00	Carayol 42'; Richards 46', 76', 81'; Harrold 61' (pen.), 75'; Paterson 65'	BBC Report; BAFC Report	Zola 54'; Stanton (yellow card) 60'; Taylor (yellow card) 85'	Attendance: 5,353; Referee: Mr. T. Kettle

21 April 2012 44	Burton Albion	0–4	Aldershot Town	Pirelli Stadium
15:00		BBC Report; BAFC Report	16' Vincenti; 61' Risser; 76', 82' Madjo	Attendance: 2,255; Referee: Mr. M. Brown

28 April 2012 45	Macclesfield Town	0–2	Burton Albion	Moss Rose, Macclesfield
15:00	Tremarco (yellow card) 84'	BBC Report; BAFC Report	Maghoma 81'; Zola 90+2'	Attendance: 2,760; Referee: Mr. O. Langford

5 May 2012 46	Burton Albion	1–2	Barnet	Pirelli Stadium
15:00	Maghoma 27'; Palmer (yellow card) 45+2'; Zola (yellow card) 64'; Stanton (yellow card) 80'	BBC Report; BAFC Report	Byrne 6' (yellow card) 50'; Hughes 60'; McLeod (yellow card) 80'	Attendance: 3,359; Referee: Mr. N. Miller

==== League Two Results summary ====
Overall								Home						Away					
Pld	W	D	L	GF	GA	GD	Pts	W	D	L	GF	GA	GD	W	D	L	GF	GA	GD
46	14	12	20	54	81	−27	54	8	7	8	24	32	−8	6	5	12	30	49	−19

Last updated: 26 August 2012.
Source: Burton Albion F.C.

==== Results by round ====
Round	1	2	3	4	5	6	7	8	9	10	11	12	13	14	15	16	17	18	19	20	21	22	23	24	25	26	27	28	29	30	31	32	33	34	35	36	37	38	39	40	41	42	43	44	45	46
Ground	A	H	H	A	A	H	A	H	H	A	H	A	H	H	A	A	H	A	H	A	H	A	A	H	H	A	A	H	A	H	A	A	H	A	A	H	H	A	H	H	A	H	A	H	A	H
Result	D	D	D	W	L	W	D	W	W	L	D	W	L	W	W	L	W	W	W	L	D	W	D	L	L	L	D	D	L	D	L	L	L	L	L	L	L	L	W	D	D	W	L	L	W	L
Position	9	16	17	10	16	11	10	7	4	9	11	8	9	8	8	8	8	5	5	5	6	5	6	7	7	9	9	11	11	11	15	15	15	15	15	17	17	17	17	16	16	16	16	17	16	17

Updated to match(es) played on 13 September 2012. Source: Burton Albion F.C.
A = Away; H = Home; W = Win; D = Draw; L = Loss

=== FA Cup ===
12 November 2011 First round	Oldham Athletic	3–1	Burton Albion	Boundary Park, Oldham
15:00	Kuqi 4' (pen.); Simpson 13'; Furman 36'; Mellor (yellow card) 60'; Taylor (yellow card) 83'	BBC Report; BAFC Report	Zola 71'; Austin (red card) 3'; James (yellow card) 88'	Attendance: 3,102; Referee: Mr. M. Naylor

=== League Cup ===
9 August 2011 First round	Burnley	6–3 (a.e.t.)	Burton Albion	Turf Moor, Burnley
19:45	Rodriguez 57' (pen.), 66' (pen.), 93', 106'; Austin 83'; Wallace 91'; Grant (yellow card) 86'; Elliott (yellow card) 90'	BBC Report; BAFC Report	Taylor 72'; Zola 85'; Maghoma 90+2'; Webster (yellow card) 38'; Bolder (yellow card) 66'	Attendance: 4,069; Referee: C. Pawson

=== Football League Trophy ===
30 August 2011 First round	Burton Albion	1–2	Sheffield United	Pirelli Stadium
19:30	Richards 73' (yellow card) 22'; McGrath (yellow card) 49'	BBC Report; BAFC Report	McAllister 76'; Tønne 80'	Attendance: 2,725; Referee: Mr. P. Gibbs

== Transfers ==
Players transferred in
Date	Pos.	Name	Previous club	Fee	Ref.
31 May 2011	MF	(Jamaica) Cleveland Taylor	(Scotland) St Johnstone	Free	
17 June 2011	MF	(England) Chris Palmer	(England) Gillingham	Free (Bosman)	
1 July 2011	FW	(Democratic Republic of the Congo) Calvin Zola	(England) Crewe Alexandra	Free	
28 July 2011	FW	(England) Justin Richards	(England) Port Vale	Free	
30 July 2011	DF	(England) Danny Blanchett	(England) Crewe Alexandra	Free	
2 August 2011	FW	(Tanzania) Adi Yussuf	(England) Leicester City	Free	
26 August 2011	FW	(Northern Ireland) Billy Kee	(England) Torquay United	£20,000	
22 September 2011	GK	(England) James Wren	(England) Walsall	Free	
30 September 2011	DF	(Ghana) Kevin Amankwaah	(England) Swindon Town	Free	
27 October 2011	MF	(Switzerland) Andres Gurrieri	(Uruguay) Sud America	Free	
21 November 2011	DF	(England) Kristian Ramsey-Dixon	(England) Continental Star	Free	
9 February 2012	DF	(England) Chris Riggott	(England) Derby County	Free	
23 February 2012	DF	(Cameroon) Patrick Ada	(Scotland) Kilmarnock	Free	
Players loaned in
Date from	Pos.	Name	From	Date to	Ref.
28 July 2011	DF	(England) Tom Parkes	(England) Leicester City	31 January 2012	
29 July 2011	GK	(England) Ross Atkins	(England) Derby County	End of season	
30 September 2011	MF	(England) Jason Banton	(England) Leicester City	30 October 2011	
5 January 2012	DF	(England) Callum Driver	(England) West Ham	7 March 2012	
26 January 2012	MF	(Wales) Lee Lucas	(Wales) Swansea City	End of season	
6 March 2012	MF	(England) Matty Harriott	(England) Sheffield United	22 March 2012	
6 March 2012	MF	(England) Lionel Ainsworth	(England) Shrewsbury Town	6 April 2012	
20 March 2012	GK	(England) Adam Legzdins	(England) Derby County	17 April 2012	
22 March 2012	MF	(Northern Ireland) Seanan Clucas	(England) Preston North End	End of season	
Players loaned out
Date from	Pos.	Name	From	Date to	Ref.
26 August 2011	FW	(England) James Ellison	(England) Alfreton Town	26 October 2011	
11 November 2011	FW	(England) James Ellison	(England) Chester	16 December 2011	
24 November 2011	FW	(England) Greg Pearson	(England) Aldershot Town	7 January 2012	
13 January 2012	FW	(England) Greg Pearson	(England) Crewe Alexandra	13 March 2012	
Players transferred out
Date	Pos.	Name	Subsequent Club	Fee	Ref.
1 July 2011	GK	(England) Adam Legzdins	(England) Derby County	Undisclosed	
Players released
Date	Pos.	Name	Subsequent club	Join date	Ref.
23 May 2011	MF	(England) Russell Penn	(England) Cheltenham Town	1 July 2011	
1 July 2011	MF	(Wales) Garyn Preen	(Wales) Neath	1 July 2011	
1 July 2011	FW	(England) Lewis Young	(England) Northampton Town	7 July 2011	
1 July 2011	FW	(England) Richard Walker	(England) Solihull Moors	9 September 2011	
1 July 2011	MF	(Republic of Ireland) Keith Gilroy	Retired	–	
1 July 2011	DF	(England) Richard Jackson	Released	–	
15 December 2011	DF	(England) Paul Boertien	Retired	–	
15 December 2011	FW	(England) James Ellison	(England) Hyde	24 December 2011	
1 January 2011	DF	(Ghana) Kevin Amankwaah	(England) Rochdale	13 January 2012	
7 February 2012	DF	(Jamaica) Darren Moore	(England) Wellington Amateurs	5 April 2012	
1 March 2012	MF	(England) Bradley Munn	(England) Eastwood Town	1 March 2012	
20 March 2012	DF	(England) Chris Riggott	Retired	–	
5 May 2012	GK	(England) Kevin Poole	Retired	–	

== Awards ==
End of Season Awards	Winner
Supporter's Player of the Season	Calvin Zola
Player's Player of Year	Nathan Stanton
Individual Performance of the Season	Billy Kee vs Barnet
Goal of the Season	Jacques Maghoma vs Dagenham & Redbridge
Most Promising Youngster	Matthew Palmer

Source: Burton Albion
Last updated 18 May 2012.
