= 2009–10 Burton Albion F.C. season =

Burton Albion
2009–10 season
- Chairman: Ben Robinson
- Manager: Paul Peschisolido
- League Two: 13th
- FA Cup: Second round (eliminated by Gillingham)
- League Cup: First round (eliminated by Reading)
- FL Trophy: First round (eliminated by Chesterfield)
- Top goalscorer: League: Harrad (21); All: Harrad (22)
- Highest home attendance: 5,801 (vs. Notts County, 28 December 2009)
- Lowest home attendance: 1,493 (vs. Chesterfield, 1 September 2009)
- Average home league attendance: 3,191
Home colours	Away colours

This article details Burton Albion F.C.'s 2009–10 season in League Two. This season was Burton's inaugural season in the Football League and saw them finish comfortably in mid-table at 13th, challenging for the play-off places throughout the season.

However, there was little success in other competitions. Despite reaching the second round of the FA Cup, 5–1 defeats against Reading and Chesterfield condemned the Brewers to defeat in the opening rounds of the League Cup and Football League Trophy.

Paul Peschisolido completed his first full season in management alongside assistant Gary Rowett. Shaun Harrad finished as top goalscorer with 22 goals in all competitions, whilst Tony James was awarded the club's Player of the Year.

== Players ==
=== First-team squad ===
Squad at end of season

Note: Flags indicate national team as defined under FIFA eligibility rules; some limited exceptions apply. Players may hold more than one non-FIFA nationality.

No.	Pos.	Nation	Player
1	GK	ENG	Kevin Poole
2	DF	ENG	Paul Boertien
3	DF	ENG	Aaron Webster
4	DF	ENG	Michael Simpson
5	DF	WAL	Tony James
6	MF	IRL	John McGrath
7	DF	ENG	Darren Stride (captain)
8	DF	ENG	Andrew Corbett
9	FW	ENG	Shaun Harrad
10	FW	ENG	Richard Walker
11	MF	IRL	Keith Gilroy
15	DF	ENG	Ryan Austin
16	MF	ENG	Russell Penn

No.	Pos.	Nation	Player
17	MF	ENG	Jimmy Phillips
18	FW	ENG	Greg Pearson
19	MF	COD	Jacques Maghoma
21	MF	BEN	Romuald Boco (Note: Boco was born in Bernay, France, but also qualifies to represent Benin internationally and made his international debut for Benin in 2004.)
22	FW	ENG	James Knowles
23	MF	JAM	Cleveland Taylor (Note: Taylor was born in Leicester, England, but also qualifies to represent Jamaica internationally and has represented them at U-20 and U-23 level.) (on loan from Brentford)
24	DF	ENG	Kevin Grocott
25	DF	ENG	Tom Parkes (on loan from Leicester City)
26	FW	ENG	Steve Kabba (on loan from Brentford)
27	DF	ENG	Richard Jackson
28	DF	ENG	Shaun Kelly
30	GK	POL	Artur Krysiak (on loan from Birmingham City)

=== Out on loan ===
Note: Flags indicate national team as defined under FIFA eligibility rules; some limited exceptions apply. Players may hold more than one non-FIFA nationality.

No.	Pos.	Nation	Player
12	FW	ENG	Robin Shroot (on loan from Birmingham City)
12	DF	JAM	O'Neil Thompson (on loan from Barnsley)
13	GK	IRL	Shane Redmond (on loan from Nottingham Forest)
13	GK	ENG	Ross Atkins (on loan from Derby County)
14	MF	ENG	Marc Goodfellow (on loan to Kidderminster Harriers)

No.	Pos.	Nation	Player
20	DF	ENG	Guy Branston (on loan to Torquay United)
21	DF	ENG	Marc Edworthy (released)
23	MF	ENG	Aaron Brown (released)
24	FW	COD	Serge Makofo (released)
25	MF	ENG	Kieron Cadogan (on loan from Crystal Palace)

== Transfers ==
=== In ===
Date	Position	Name	Club From	Fee
8 June 2009	DF	Paul Boertien	Walsall	Free
1 July 2009	FW	Richard Walker	Bristol Rovers	Free
9 July 2009	MF	Russell Penn	Kidderminster Harriers	Undisclosed
16 July 2009	DF	Guy Branston	Kettering Town	Undisclosed
16 July 2009	MF	Jacques Maghoma	Tottenham Hotspur	Free
28 September 2009	MF	Aaron Brown	Free Agency	Free
4 December 2009	DF	Richard Jackson	Free Agency	Free

=== Out ===
Date	Position	Name	Club To	Fee
1 July 2009	DF	Jake Buxton	Derby County	Free
2 January 2010	MF	Aaron Brown	Free Agency	Released
2 January 2010	FW	Serge Makofo	Free Agency	Released

=== Loan In ===
Date	Position	Name	Club From	Length
1 July 2009	FW	Robin Shroot	Birmingham City	Full Season (recalled 6 October)
7 July 2009	GK	Shane Redmond	Nottingham Forest	Until January
13 August 2009	GK	Artur Krysiak	Birmingham City	One Month
1 September 2009	GK	Artur Krysiak	Birmingham City	Until January
30 November 2009	FW	Steve Kabba	Brentford	One Month
23 December 2009	FW	Steve Kabba	Brentford	One Month
15 January 2010	FW	Steve Kabba	Brentford	Until end of season
15 January 2010	MF	Cleveland Taylor	Brentford	Until end of season
22 January 2010	GK	Ross Atkins	Derby County	One Month
22 January 2010	DF	Tom Parkes	Leicester City	One Month (extended 30 January)

== Squad statistics ==
=== Goalscorers ===
As of 8 May 2010. Includes all competitive matches. The list is sorted by shirt number when total goals are equal.

Position	Nation	No.	Name	League Two	FA Cup	League Cup	JP Trophy	Total
1	(England)	9	Shaun Harrad	21	1	0	0	22
2	(England)	18	Greg Pearson	14	0	0	0	14
3	(England)	26	Steve Kabba	6	0	0	0	6
4	(England)	3	Aaron Webster	4	0	0	0	4
	(England)	16	Russell Penn	4	0	0	0	4
	(Democratic Republic of the Congo)	19	Jacques Maghoma	3	1	0	0	4
	(Jamaica)	23	Cleveland Taylor	4	0	0	0	4
5	(England)	10	Richard Walker	3	0	0	0	3
	(England)	15	Ryan Austin	2	1	0	0	3
6	(England)	4	Michael Simpson	2	0	0	0	2
	(Republic of Ireland)	6	John McGrath	1	0	0	1	2
	(England)	17	Jimmy Phillips	1	0	1	0	2
7	(England)	2	Paul Boertien	1	0	0	0	1
	(Wales)	5	Tony James	1	0	0	0	1
	(England)	8	Andrew Corbett	1	0	0	0	1
	(England)	25	Tom Parkes	1	0	0	0	1
TOTALS				69	3	1	1	74

Source: Burton Albion.

== Match results ==
=== Legend ===
Win	Draw	Loss

=== Pre-season ===
11 July 2009	Burton Albion	0–1	Derby County	Burton upon Trent
15:00 BST		(Report)	Porter 19'	Stadium: Pirelli Stadium; Attendance: 3,518

14 July 2009	Burton Albion	2–3	Ilkeston Town	Rangemore
19:45 BST	Phillips; Richards	(Report)	Unknown	Stadium: National Football Centre; Attendance: Behind closed doors

18 July 2009	Burton Albion	1–4	Nottingham Forest	Burton upon Trent
15:00 BST	Shroot	(Report)	Unknown	Stadium: Pirelli Stadium; Attendance: 2,013

21 July 2009	Rocester	0–8	Burton Albion	Rocester
20:00 BST		(Report)	Goodfellow; Goodfellow; Shroot; McGrath; Harrad; Phillips; Branston; Pearson	Stadium: Hillsfield; Attendance: 275

25 July 2009	Burton Albion	3–2	Birmingham City XI	Burton upon Trent
15:00 BST	Shroot; Walker; Maghoma	(Report)	Unknown	Stadium: Pirelli Stadium; Attendance: 1,250

30 July 2009	Burton Albion	1–0	Derby County	Burton upon Trent
19:45 BST	Harrad	(Report)		Stadium: Pirelli Stadium; Attendance: 1,492

1 August 2009	Altrincham	2–3	Burton Albion	Altrincham
15:00 BST	Unknown	(Report)	Walker; Maghoma; Shroot	Stadium: Moss Lane; Attendance: 417

=== Coca-Cola League Two ===
8 August 2009	Shrewsbury Town	3–1	Burton Albion	Shrewsbury
	Robinson 10'; Hibbert 49'; Labadie 83'		Pearson 62'	Stadium: New Meadow; Attendance: 6,438; Referee: Kevin Wright

15 August 2009	Burton Albion	5–2	Morecambe	Burton upon Trent
	Pearson 3', 54' (pen.); Penn 16'; Harrad 38'; McGrath 75'		Craney 17'; Jevons 62'	Stadium: Pirelli Stadium; Attendance: 2,742; Referee: A.R. Hall

18 August 2009	Burton Albion	0–2	Torquay United	Burton upon Trent
			Rendell 26'; Benyon 37'	Stadium: Pirelli Stadium; Attendance: 2,670; Referee: C.Pawson

22 August 2009	Lincoln City F.C.	0–2	Burton Albion	Lincoln
			Austin 23'; Penn 90+4'	Stadium: Sincil Bank; Attendance: 3,590; Referee: G. Eltringham

29 August 2009	Burton Albion	3–2	Northampton Town	Burton upon Trent
	Harrad 2'; Simpson 7', 11'		Guinan 72'; Gilligan 81' (pen.)	Stadium: Pirelli Stadium; Attendance: 3,321; Referee: R. Shoebridge

5 September 2009	Notts County	1–1	Burton Albion	Nottingham
	Hawley 54'		Walker 84'	Stadium: Meadow Lane; Attendance: 8,891; Referee: A. Woolmer

12 September 2009	Bradford City	1–1	Burton Albion	Bradford
	Evans 24'		Boertien 74'	Stadium: Valley Parade; Attendance: 11,439; Referee: Mick Russell

19 September 2009	Burton Albion	0–1	Dagenham & Redbridge	Burton upon Trent
			Benson 4'	Stadium: Pirelli Stadium; Attendance: 2,689; Referee: J. Waugh

26 September 2009	AFC Bournemouth	1–0	Burton Albion	Bournemouth
	Pitman 86'			Stadium: Dean Court; Attendance: 6,327; Referee: J. Singh

29 September 2009	Burton Albion	1–1	Macclesfield Town	Burton upon Trent
	Pearson 37'		Sinclair 14'	Stadium: Pirelli Stadium; Attendance: 2,332; Referee: C. Webster

4 October 2009	Burton Albion	1–0	Rochdale	Burton upon Trent
	Walker 3'			Stadium: Pirelli Stadium; Attendance: 3,119; Referee: F. Graham

10 October 2009	Grimsby Town	1–2	Burton Albion	Cleethorpes
	C Jones 4'		Corbett 10'; Phillips 31'	Stadium: Blundell Park; Attendance: 4,002; Referee: S. Rushton

17 October 2009	Burton Albion	2–0	Barnet	Burton upon Trent
	Maghoma 8'; Austin 78'			Stadium: Pirelli Stadium; Attendance: 2,935; Referee: Eddie Ilderton

24 October 2009	Chesterfield	5–2	Burton Albion	Chesterfield
	Hall 13'; Allott 24'; Lester 81'; Talbot 89'; McDermott 90+5'		Webster 79'; Harrad 90+4'	Stadium: Saltergate; Attendance: 4,218; Referee: D. Sheldrake

31 October 2009	Burton Albion	0–0	Bury	Burton upon Trent
				Stadium: Pirelli Stadium; Attendance: 3,373; Referee: Andy Penn

14 November 2009	Darlington	1–0	Burton Albion	Darlington
	Main 7'			Stadium: The Darlington Arena; Attendance: 2,404; Referee: Dave Foster

21 November 2009	Burton Albion	3–2	Hereford United	Burton upon Trent
	Harrad 50', 64' (pen.); Webster 87'		Constantine 61', 76'	Stadium: Pirelli Stadium; Attendance: 2,796; Referee: D. Whitestone

24 November 2009	Crewe Alexandra	2–1	Burton Albion	Crewe
	Donaldson 12'; Grant 19'		Walker 90+4'	Stadium: Alexandra Stadium; Attendance: 3,446; Referee: Graham Salisbury

1 December 2009	Burton Albion	0–2	Accrington Stanley	Burton upon Trent
			Kee 45+1'; Symes 76'	Stadium: Pirelli Stadium; Attendance: 2,027; Referee: P. Taylor

5 December 2009	Rotherham United	2–2	Burton Albion	Sheffield
	Le Fondre 39' (pen.); Le Fondre 63'	(Report)	Webster 65'; Pearson 85'	Stadium: Don Valley Stadium; Attendance: 3,177; Referee: S. Hooper

12 December 2009	Burton Albion	6–1	Aldershot Town	Burton upon Trent
	Pearson 31' (pen.), 39', 45'; Kabba 43', 45'; Harrad 84'	(Report)	Grant 67'	Stadium: Pirelli Stadium; Attendance: 2,547; Referee: A. Haines

28 December 2009	Burton Albion	1–4	Notts County	Burton upon Trent
	Kabba 38'	(Report)	Ravenhill 13'; Hughes 45', 48', 53'	Stadium: Pirelli Stadium; Attendance: 5,801; Referee: Mick Russell

16 January 2010	Burton Albion	1–1	Shrewsbury Town	Burton upon Trent
	Pearson 75'	(Report)	Hibbert 13'	Stadium: Pirelli Stadium; Attendance: 3,139; Referee: Neil Swarbrick

19 January 2010	Port Vale	3–1	Burton Albion	Burslem
	Richards 7', 85' (pen.); Rigg 25'	(Report)	Harrad 15' (p)	Stadium: Vale Park; Attendance: 4,458; Referee: G. Eltringham

23 January 2010	Torquay United	2–3	Burton Albion	Torquay
	Rendell 8'; Robertson 15'	(Report)	Penn 31'; Harrad 56'; Taylor 84'	Stadium: Plainmoor; Attendance: 2,629; Referee: D. Phillips

27 January 2010	Burton Albion	1–0	Lincoln City	Burton upon Trent
	Taylor 1'	(Report)		Stadium: Pirelli Stadium; Attendance: 2,109; Referee: D. Phillips

27 January 2010	Northampton Town	1–1	Burton Albion	Northampton
	Holt 88'	(Report)	Harrad 53'	Stadium: Sixfields Stadium; Attendance: 4,552; Referee: A.R. Hall

6 February 2010	Burton Albion	1–0	Port Vale	Burton upon Trent
	Maghoma 39'	(Report)		Stadium: Pirelli Stadium; Attendance: 4,644; Referee: P. Crossley

9 February 2010	Cheltenham Town	0–1	Burton Albion	Cheltenham
		(Report)	Harrad 7'	Stadium: Whaddon Road; Attendance: 2,593; Referee: Steve Tanner

12 February 2010	Burton Albion	1–2	Crewe Alexandra	Burton upon Trent
	Harrad 28'	(Report)	Miller 27'; Donaldson 84'	Stadium: Pirelli Stadium; Attendance: 2,985; Referee: S.J. Bratt

16 February 2010	Morecambe	3–2	Burton Albion	Morecambe
	Drummond 28'; Jevons 72'; Mullin 85'	(Report)	Maghoma 23'; Harrad 41'	Stadium: Christie Park; Attendance: 1,537; Referee: G. Sutton

20 February 2010	Hereford United	3–4	Burton Albion	Hereford
	Pugh 28'; Lunt 55'; McQuilkin 59'	(Report)	Harrad 9'; Taylor 60'; Webster 66'; James 90'	Stadium: Edgar Street; Attendance: 2,253; Referee: M.J. Jones

27 February 2010	Burton Albion	0–1	Rotherham United	Burton upon Trent
		(Report)	Le Fondre 52'	Stadium: Pirelli Stadium; Attendance: 3,568; Referee: K. Stroud

6 March 2010	Aldershot Town	0–2	Burton Albion	Aldershot
		(Report)	Parkes 9'; Kabba 26'	Stadium: Recreation Ground; Attendance: 2,784; Referee: R. East

13 March 2010	Burton Albion	5–6	Cheltenham Town	Burton upon Trent
	Harrad 2', 32' (pen.); Kabba 58', 72', 85'	(Report)	Richards 54'; Elito 56'; Pook 84', 87', 90+4'; Richards 90'	Stadium: Pirelli Stadium; Attendance: 2,500; Referee: C. Boyeson

20 March 2010	Burton Albion	2–2	Chesterfield	Burton upon Trent
	Penn 40'; Pearson 90+5'	(Report)	Demontagnac 34'; S Boden 61'	Stadium: Pirelli Stadium; Attendance: 3,696; Referee: T. Kettle

23 March 2010	Accrington Stanley	0–2	Burton Albion	Accrington
		(Report)	Harrad 27'; Pearson 79'	Stadium: The Fraser Eagle Stadium; Attendance: 1,270; Referee: R. Booth

27 March 2010	Barnet	1–1	Burton Albion	Barnet
	Hughes 45+1'	(Report)	Pearson 18'	Stadium: Underhill Stadium; Attendance: 1,842; Referee: P. Gibbs

3 April 2010	Burton Albion	1–2	Darlington	Burton upon Trent
	Pearson 45+1' (p)	(Report)	Gray 22'; White 32'	Stadium: Pirelli Stadium; Attendance: 2,779; Referee: J Waugh

5 April 2010	Bury	3–0	Burton Albion	Bury
	James (og) 9'; Morrell 76', 86'	(Report)		Stadium: Gigg Lane; Attendance: 2,710; Referee: N.Miller

10 April 2010	Burton Albion	1–1	Bradford City	Burton upon Trent
	Harrad 82'	(Report)	Oliver 59'	Stadium: Pirelli Stadium; Attendance: 2,648; Referee: Michael Oliver

13 April 2010	Macclesfield Town	1–1	Burton Albion	Macclesfield
	Brown 3'	(Report)	Tipton 58' (o.g.)	Stadium: Moss Rose; Attendance: 1,588; Referee: Andy Penn

17 April 2010	Dagenham & Redbridge	2–1	Burton Albion	Dagenham
	Vincelot 52'; Montgomery 90+5'	(Report)	Harrad 22'	Stadium: London Borough of Barking & Dagenham Stadium; Attendance: 1,891; Referee: P. Miller

24 April 2010	Burton Albion	0–2	AFC Bournemouth	Burton upon Trent
		(Report)	Pitman 66'; Connell 90'	Stadium: Pirelli Stadium; Attendance: 3,977; Referee: Geoff Eltringham

1 May 2010	Rochdale	1–2	Burton Albion	Rochdale
	O'Grady 79'	(Report)	Taylor 62'; Harrad 66' (pen.)	Stadium: Spotland; Attendance: 3,749; Referee: K. Evans

8 May 2010	Burton Albion	3–0	Grimsby Town	Burton upon Trent
	Pearson 10'; Harrad 37', 58'	(Report)		Stadium: Pirelli Stadium; Attendance: 4,987; Referee: A. Bates

==== League Two results summary ====
Overall								Home						Away					
Pld	W	D	L	GF	GA	GD	Pts	W	D	L	GF	GA	GD	W	D	L	GF	GA	GD
46	17	11	18	71	71	0	62	9	5	9	38	34	+4	8	6	9	33	37	−4

Last updated: 14 August 2010.
Source: Burton Albion F.C.

==== Results by round ====
Round	1	2	3	4	5	6	7	8	9	10	11	12	13	14	15	16	17	18	19	20	21	22	23	24	25	26	27	28	29	30	31	32	33	34	35	36	37	38	39	40	41	42	43	44	45	46
Ground	A	H	H	A	H	A	A	H	A	H	H	A	H	A	H	A	H	A	H	A	H	H	H	A	A	H	A	H	A	H	A	A	H	A	H	H	A	A	H	A	H	A	A	H	A	H
Result	L	W	L	W	W	D	D	L	L	D	W	W	W	L	D	L	W	L	L	D	W	L	D	L	W	W	D	W	W	L	L	W	L	W	L	D	W	D	L	L	D	D	L	L	W	W
Position	20	8	16	10	8	8	10	12	14	13	12	10	8	11	11	11	10	12	15	15	12	14	12	14	15	13	14	12	9	10	12	9	13	11	14	14	12	12	13	13	13	13	13	13	14	13

Source: Burton Albion F.C.
A = Away; H = Home; W = Win; D = Draw; L = Loss

=== FA Cup ===
8 November 2009 First round	Burton Albion	3–2	Oxford City	Burton upon Trent
15:00 GMT	Harrad 15' (pen.); Maghoma 45'; Austin 90+6'	(Report)	Alexis 6'; Brooks 55'	Stadium: Pirelli Stadium; Attendance: 2,207; Referee: K. Evans

28 November 2009 Second round	Gillingham	1–0	Burton Albion	Gillingham
15:00 GMT	Weston 69'	(Report)		Stadium: KRBS Priestfield Stadium; Attendance: 4,996; Referee: T. Kettle

=== Carling Cup ===
11 August 2009 First round	Reading	5–1	Burton Albion	Reading
20:00 BST	Mooney 6', 77'; Bignall 7', 9'; Sigurðsson 27'	(Report)	Phillips 59'	Stadium: Madejski Stadium; Attendance: 5,893; Referee: Gavin Ward

=== Johnstone's Paint Trophy ===
1 September 2009 First round	Burton Albion	1–5	Chesterfield	Burton upon Trent
19:45 GMT	McGrath 46'	(Report)	Small 17', 62'; Talbot 38', 90+3'; Lowry 87'	Stadium: Pirelli Stadium; Attendance: 1,493; Referee: Peter Quinn
