= Richard Jackson (footballer, born 1980) =

English footballer, born 1980

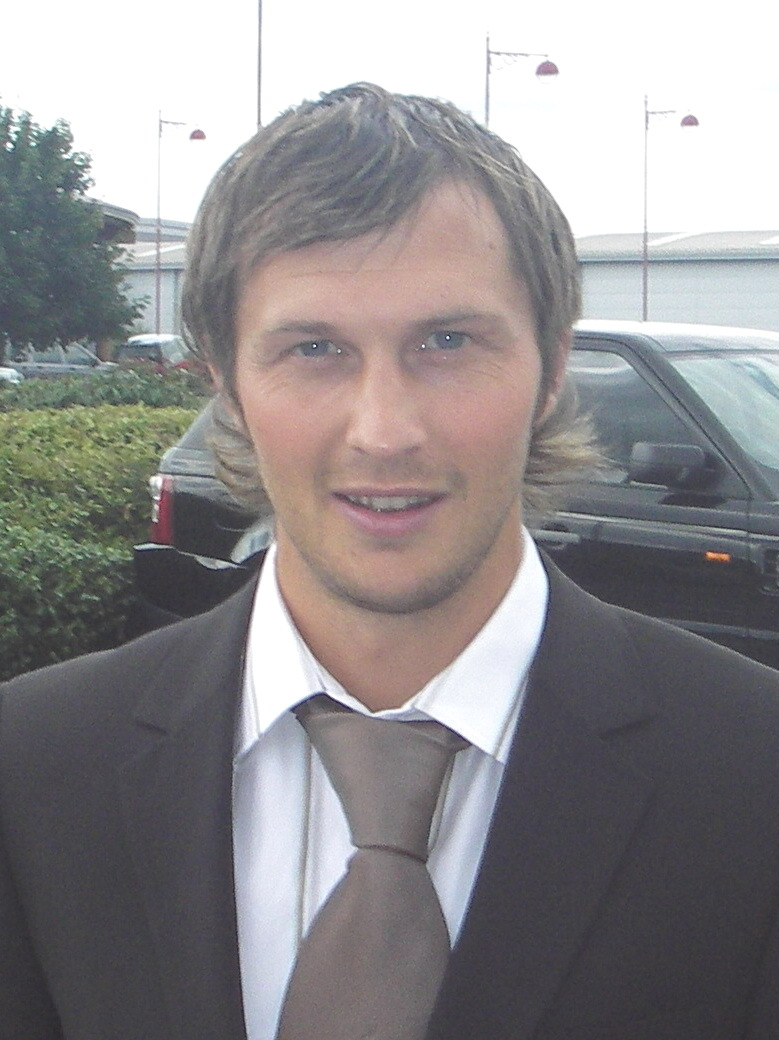
- Jackson in 2006

Personal information
- Full name: Richard Jackson
- Date of birth: 18 April 1980 (age 46)
- Place of birth: Whitby, England
- Height: 5 ft 8 in (1.73 m)
- Position: Right-back

Senior career*
Years	Team	Apps	(Gls)
1997–1999	Scarborough	22	(0)
1999–2007	Derby County	118	(0)
2007–2008	Luton Town	29	(0)
2008–2009	Hereford United	25	(0)
2009	Whitby Town	2	(0)
2009–2011	Burton Albion	5	(0)
Total		201	(0)
- * Club domestic league appearances and goals

Richard Jackson (born 18 April 1980) is an English former professional footballer who played as a defender.

== Career ==
=== Scarborough ===
Born in Whitby, North Yorkshire, Jackson began his career at Third Division club Scarborough, as a trainee in August 1997. He made his first-team debut for the club in a 4–0 win at home to Doncaster Rovers on 1 November 1997. Jackson signed his first professional contract with Scarborough on 27 March 1998. In 1998–99, Jackson made 22 appearances in all competitions for Scarborough.

=== Derby County ===
Jackson signed for Premier League club Derby County in March 1999 for a transfer fee of £30,000. He did not feature for the club until making successive appearances in the final two matches of 1999–2000, including his debut for Derby in a 0–0 draw at home to Newcastle United on 6 May 2000. Jackson made three appearances in 2000–01, and seven in 2001–02 respectively, with the latter resulting in Derby's relegation to the First Division. He broke into the first-team on a regular basis in 2002–03, during which he made 21 appearances, and was offered a new contract at the end of the season. Jackson consolidated his place in the first-team in 2003–04, making 37 appearances, and signed a new two-year contract on 12 May 2004. He made 20 appearances in 2004–05, until he suffered a groin injury in a match against Leeds United in January 2005, which ruled him out of first-team action until May as Derby reached the Championship play-offs. Jackson featured in both play-off semi-final matches against Preston North End, which resulted in a 2–0 defeat for Derby on aggregate. He made 27 appearances in 2005–06, which was interrupted by another groin injury that saw him ruled out of first-team action for all of September and October 2005 and a hamstring injury that ruled him out for several weeks in the spring of 2006. By this time, Jackson was the longest serving player at Derby and, on 26 January 2006, signed a contract keeping him at the club until the summer of 2008. However, Jackson made only seven further appearances for Derby in 2006–07.

=== Luton Town ===
Jackson moved to newly relegated League One club Luton Town on a free transfer, signing a two-year contract on 8 August 2007. He made his Luton debut on the opening day of 2007–08 in a 2–1 win at home to Hartlepool United. Jackson made 37 appearances in all competitions, but his contract was terminated by mutual consent on 21 August 2008.

=== Hereford United ===
On 4 September 2008, Jackson signed a one-year contract with League One club Hereford United. He made his Hereford debut one day later in a 1–1 draw at home to Swindon Town. Jackson made 26 appearances for Hereford, but left the club before the end of the season.

=== Whitby Town and Burton Albion ===
On 22 October 2009, Jackson was set to sign for Darlington as one of four new players brought in by manager Steve Staunton, but Jackson's own deal fell through. He dropped into non-league to play for his hometown club Whitby Town, before he was signed by League Two club Burton Albion on a one-month contract on 4 December 2009, managed by his former Derby and Luton teammate Paul Peschisolido as cover for injuries to Ryan Austin and Andrew Corbett. He made his debut one day later when he was named in the starting lineup in a 2–2 draw away to Rotherham United. He made two further appearances, before signing a new one-and-a-half-year contract until the end of 2010–11. However, Jackson only made two appearances during this time as a result of various injuries, and was released by Burton at the end of 2010–11.

== Career statistics ==
Appearances and goals by club, season and competition
Club	Season	League			FA Cup		League Cup		Other		Total	
Club	Season	Division	Apps	Goals	Apps	Goals	Apps	Goals	Apps	Goals	Apps	Goals
Scarborough	1997–98	Third Division	2	0	0	0	0	0	0	0	2	0
Scarborough	1998–99	Third Division	20	0	0	0	2	0	0	0	22	0
Scarborough	Total		22	0	0	0	2	0	0	0	24	0
Derby County	1998–99	Premier League	0	0	—		—		—		0	0
Derby County	1999–2000	Premier League	2	0	0	0	0	0	—		2	0
Derby County	2000–01	Premier League	2	0	0	0	1	0	—		3	0
Derby County	2001–02	Premier League	7	0	0	0	0	0	—		7	0
Derby County	2002–03	First Division	21	0	0	0	0	0	—		21	0
Derby County	2003–04	First Division	36	0	0	0	1	0	—		37	0
Derby County	2004–05	Championship	19	0	1	0	1	0	2 (Note: Appearances in Championship play-offs)	0	23	0
Derby County	2005–06	Championship	26	0	0	0	1	0	—		27	0
Derby County	2006–07	Championship	5	0	1	0	1	0	—		7	0
Derby County	Total		118	0	2	0	5	0	2	0	127	0
Luton Town	2007–08	League One	29	0	4	0	3	0	1 (Note: Appearance in Football League Trophy)	0	37	0
Hereford United	2008–09	League One	25	0	0	0	0	0	1	0	26	0
Whitby Town	2009–10	NPL Premier Division	2	0	0	0	—		0	0	2	0
Burton Albion	2009–10	League Two	5	0	0	0	0	0	0	0	5	0
Career total			201	0	6	0	10	0	4	0	221	0
