= Andrew Corbet (disambiguation) =

Andrew Corbet (1580–1637) was an English MP who opposed the absolutist tendencies of Charles I.

Andrew Corbet or Corbett may also refer to:

- Andrew Corbet (died 1578) or Andrew Corbett (1522–1578), MP for Shropshire, 1555 and 1559
- Andrew Corbett (born 1980), English footballer
