= Callum Driver =

English footballer

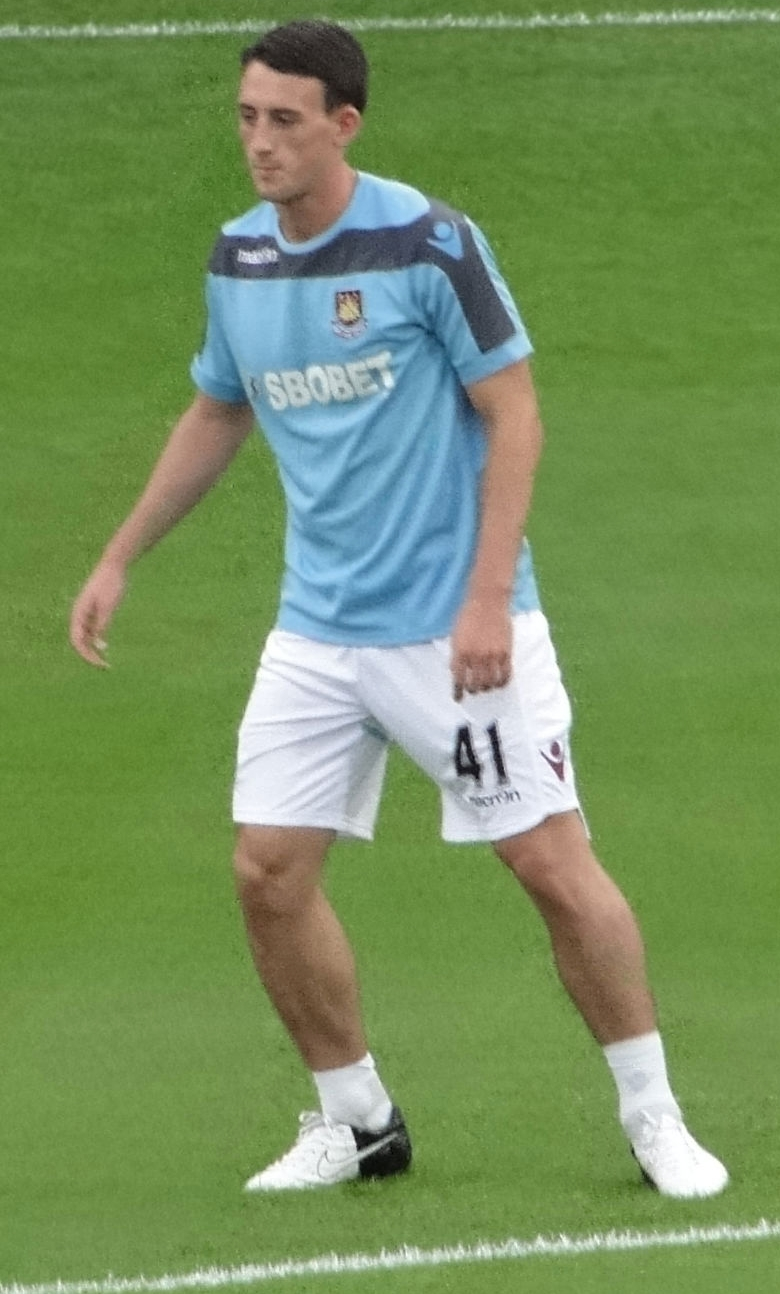
- Driver warming up for West Ham United in August 2012

Personal information
- Full name: Callum Charles John Driver
- Date of birth: 23 October 1992 (age 34)
- Place of birth: Sidcup, England
- Height: 5 ft 10 in (1.78 m)
- Position: Defender

Youth career
- 200?–2011: West Ham United

Senior career*
Years	Team	Apps	(Gls)
2011–2014	West Ham United	1	(0)
2012	→ Burton Albion (loan)	8	(1)
2014	Whitehawk	9	(0)
2014–2015	Dartford	22	(0)
2015–2017	Maidstone United	43	(1)
2017	→ Hemel Hempstead Town (loan)	14	(2)
2017	Hemel Hempstead Town	17	(1)
2017–2018	Welling United	22	(2)
2018–2019	Dartford	15	(0)
2019	→ Leatherhead (loan)	6	(0)
2019–2020	Leatherhead	13	(1)
- * Club domestic league appearances and goals as of 15:52, 27 November 2020 (UTC)

Callum Charles John Driver (born 23 October 1992) is an English semi-professional footballer who last played as a defender for Leatherhead.

== Club career ==
Driver was born in Sidcup, London. He joined as a youth team player for West Ham aged 12 and signed his first professional contract with the club in July 2011. Having been involved in several first-team squads with West Ham, in January 2012 he moved on loan to League Two club Burton Albion until 31 January 2012. Driver made his debut for Burton on 6 January 2012 in a home game against Accrington Stanley, the match ended 2–0 to Accrington. Driver scored his first goal for Burton on 14 February 2012 in a 3–2 away defeat to Crewe Alexandra. After two months with Burton and without ever playing in a winning team, Driver returned to West Ham. He made his official debut on 5 January 2014 for West Ham against Nottingham Forest at the City Ground in the FA Cup. Driver was released by West Ham at the end of the 2013–14 season.

After being released by West Ham, he signed for Conference South club Whitehawk and went on to make 14 first-team appearances for the club before being released in October 2014. On 11 November 2014 Driver signed a contract with Conference Premier club Dartford going straight into their squad on the same day for their league encounter with Welling United.

In May 2015, following the club's relegation from the Conference Premier, he joined newly promoted National League South club Maidstone United on a free transfer, rejecting a new deal with Dartford. Driver was a regular fixture at right back for the Stones during the 2015–16 season, and helped the club achieve promotion to the National League via the playoffs.

He agreed a new deal with the club for the 2016–17 season.

On 20 January 2017, Driver joined Hemel Hempstead Town on a three-month loan deal. He signed permanently for the club in June 2017, after leaving Maidstone.

On 8 December 2017, Driver joined Welling United and made his debut for the club a day later on 9 December 2017 in a 2–2 draw at Park View Road with Truro City. He scored his first goal for the club, in his third game, on 26 December 2017 in a 3–2 defeat at home to his former club Dartford.

On 22 May 2018, Driver resigned for Dartford.

On 25 January 2019, Driver joined Leatherhead on a month's loan.

== Career statistics ==
As of match played 25 February 2020.

Club	Season	League			FA Cup		League Cup		Other		Total	
Club	Season	Division	Apps	Goals	Apps	Goals	Apps	Goals	Apps	Goals	Apps	Goals
West Ham United	2011–12	Championship	0	0	0	0	0	0	0	0	0	0
West Ham United	2012–13	Premier League	0	0	0	0	0	0	—		0	0
West Ham United	2013–14	Premier League	0	0	1	0	0	0	—		1	0
West Ham United	Total		0	0	1	0	0	0	0	0	1	0
Burton Albion (loan)	2011–12	League Two	8	1	0	0	0	0	0	0	8	1
Whitehawk	2014–15	Conference South	9	0	2	0	—		0	0	11	0
Dartford	2014–15	Conference Premier	22	0	—		—		4 (Note: Appearance(s) in FA Trophy)	0	26	0
Maidstone United	2015–16	National League South	37	1	4	0	—		5 (Note: Two appearances in FA Trophy, three in National League South play-offs)	0	46	1
Maidstone United	2016–17	National League	6	0	0	0	—		2	0	8	0
Maidstone United	Total		43	1	4	0	—		7	0	54	1
Hemel Hempstead Town (loan)	2016–17	National League South	14	2	0	0	—		0	0	14	2
Hemel Hempstead Town	2017–18	National League South	17	1	3	0	—		2	0	22	1
Welling United	2017–18	National League South	22	2	0	0	—		0	0	22	2
Dartford	2018–19	National League South	15	0	0	0	—		0	0	15	0
Leatherhead (loan)	2018–19	Isthmian League Premier Division	6	0	0	0	—		0	0	6	0
Leatherhead	2019–20	Isthmian League Premier Division	13	1	2	0	—		3 (Note: Two appearances in FA Trophy, one in Alan Turvey Trophy)	0	18	1
Career total			169	8	12	0	0	0	16	0	197	8

== Honours ==
Maidstone United

- National League South play-offs: 2015–16
