= Jacques Maghoma =

Congolese footballer (born 1987)

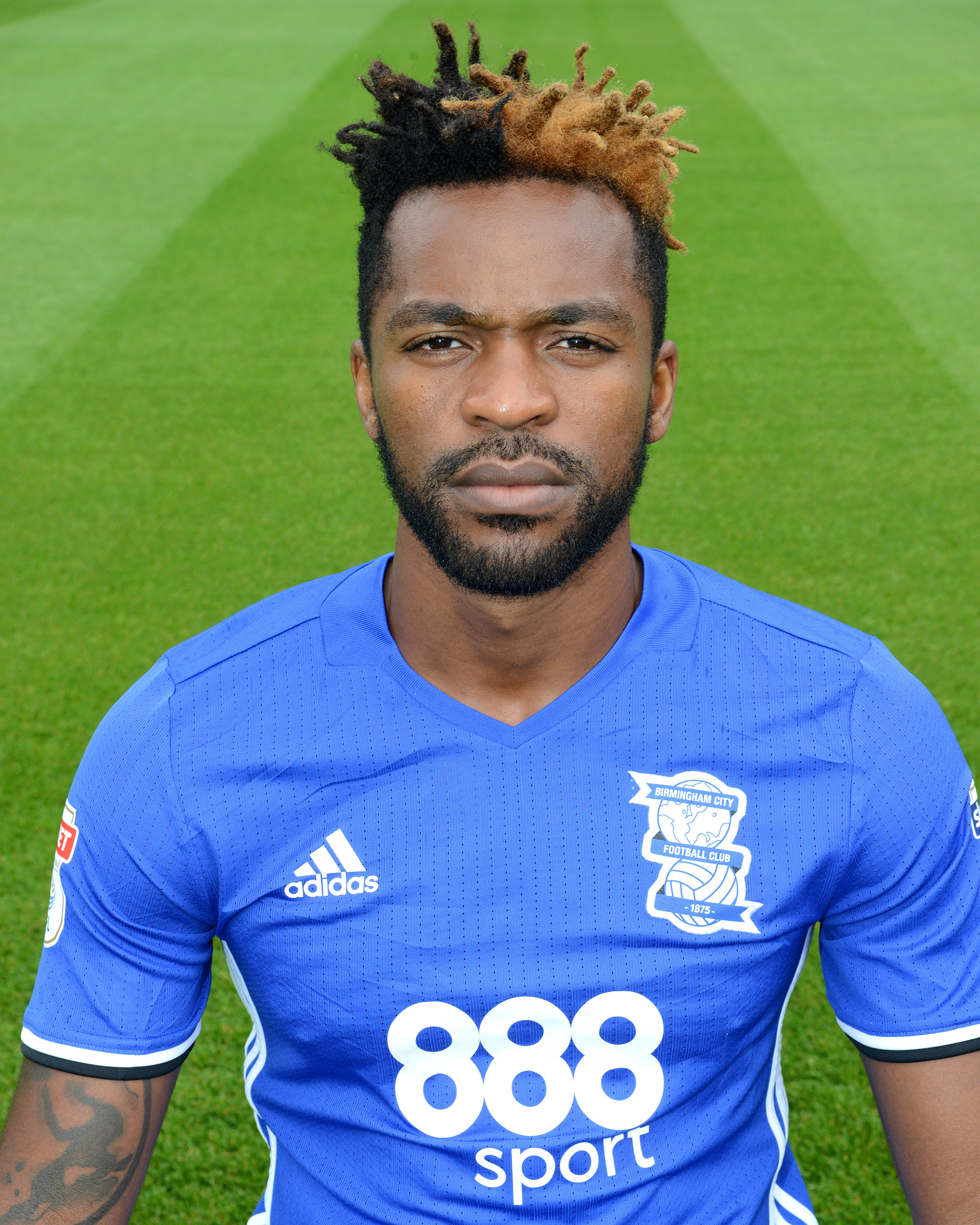
- Maghoma with Birmingham City in 2016

Personal information
- Full name: Jacques Ilonda Maghoma
- Date of birth: 23 October 1987 (age 39)
- Place of birth: Lubumbashi, Zaire
- Height: 1.77 m (5 ft 10 in)
- Position: Midfielder

Youth career
- 2003–2009: Tottenham Hotspur

Senior career*
Years	Team	Apps	(Gls)
2009–2013	Burton Albion	155	(26)
2013–2015	Sheffield Wednesday	57	(2)
2015–2020	Birmingham City	168	(20)
2020–2021	East Bengal	19	(3)
2021	Spalding United	0	(0)
2021–2022	Hemel Hempstead Town	4	(0)
Total		403	(51)

International career
2010	DR Congo B	1	(1)
2010–2019	DR Congo	25	(0)
- * Club domestic league appearances and goals

Jacques Ilonda Maghoma (born 23 October 1987) is a Congolese former professional footballer who made 380 appearances in the Football League between 2009 and 2020 and 25 for the DR Congo national team between 2010 and 2019.

A midfielder, Maghoma began his career with Tottenham Hotspur, and has also played for Sheffield Wednesday and Burton Albion, where he was the player of the season for 2012–13. He spent five seasons with Birmingham City, and was their player of the year for 2017–18, before spending a season with East Bengal of the Indian Super League. After a few matches in English non-league football, Maghoma announced his retirement in October 2022.

Internationally, Maghoma was first capped for the DR Congo in 2010.

== Club career ==
=== Tottenham Hotspur ===
Born in Lubumbashi, Zaire, Maghoma began his career at Tottenham Hotspur, joining the youth academy in 2003. He progressed to the reserve side, making numerous appearances, although he suffered a number of injuries during his time at the club. He went on trial to Leeds United, but was not offered a permanent deal. Maghoma was also linked with a move to Hamburg in the summer, but the move never happened.

After five years at the academy, Maghoma was released by Tottenham manager Harry Redknapp in June 2009.

=== Burton Albion ===
After training with both Hereford United and Burton Albion, Maghoma decided to join the latter, newly promoted to League Two, on a two-year contract. Manager Paul Peschisolido was impressed by his displays in the pre-season friendly matches, and Maghoma was in the starting eleven for both his and his team's Football League debut, on 8 August 2009 in a 3–1 defeat away to Shrewsbury Town. His first Burton goal came in a 2–0 home win against Barnet on 19 October. Having established himself in the team in the second half of the season, he scored his second goal in a 1–0 home win against Port Vale on 6 February 2010, and his third in a 3–2 loss away to Morecambe ten days later. A knee injury suffered in mid-March flared up again in April, leaving the player facing exploratory surgery, and he missed much of the last two months of the season. He finished the campaign with 4 goals from 38 appearances in all competitions.

Minor knocks did not prevent Maghoma beginning Burton's season in the matchday squad, albeit on the bench. After turning down an international call-up to the DR Congo team to concentrate on his club career – particularly on his defensive duties – Maghoma scored his first goal of the season in a 1–1 draw with Crewe Alexandra on 18 September. He also scored as Burton beat Chesterfield 3–1 in the FA Cup second round, and again two weeks later in a 3–1 win over Southend United, after which Peschisolido praised his "superb" performance but wanted him to produce similar standards every week. In the penultimate match of the season, away to Southend, Maghoma received the first red card of his career for reacting verbally to provocation from home fans after Scott Malone's goal that ensured Burton's survival in League Two. Malone suggested that a professional player "needs to handle it a little bit better". With 43 league appearances, and rated one of the club's most consistent outfield players, Maghoma was runner-up to goalkeeper Adam Legzdins in the Supporters' Player of the Year poll. His delay in accepting the club's offer of a new contract caused Peschisolido to resign himself to the player leaving, but Maghoma rejected offers from abroad in favour of two more years with Burton, and intended to make every effort to improve his own performance and to go for the League Two title.

After serving a suspension in the opening game of the season, Maghoma returned to action in the League Cup first round away to Burnley. He equalised in the last few minutes to take the game into extra time, but Burton went on to lose 6–3. A victory against Crewe Alexandra meant that his absence with an ankle knock was not crucial, and he returned to score his first goal of the season as Burton beat Swindon Town 2–0. However, he only worsened the problem, and a scan confirmed ligament damage likely to keep him out for six weeks; he was back in four. He missed another month with a hamstring injury sustained in February, but apart from that was a regular in the starting eleven for the remainder of the season, and scored three times in the last month of the campaign to take his total to five from 38 appearances in all competitions.

Maghoma began the 2012–13 season with a goal and an assist in a 6–2 win over AFC Wimbledon. He also "thundered in a swerving 30-yard effort" as Burton eliminated Championship side Leicester City from the League Cup on their own ground by four goals to two, and scored two goals and set up another for Calvin Zola in a 4–0 win over Oxford United. Four goals in three consecutive games – two against Fleetwood Town, and one each against Exeter City and Morecambe – earned Maghoma the League Two Player of the Month award for February 2013. He scored both goals in a 2–0 defeat of Wycombe Wanderers in April that took Burton into the automatic promotion positions, but they finished fourth, so went into the play-offs against Bradford City. Burton won the first leg 3–2, and Maghoma opened the scoring in the second from the penalty spot, but Bradford City won 5–4 on aggregate, so Burton stayed in League Two.

He was the club's top scorer for the season, with 18 goals from 50 appearances, became the first Burton Albion player to be named in the PFA League Two Team of the Year, placed sixth in the poll of League Two managers to choose the division's player of the year, received the club's Players' Player of the Season award, and was runner-up to Lee Bell as Supporters' Player of the Season. With his contract due to expire and interest reported from Championship clubs, it became clear that Maghoma would be leaving. Manager Gary Rowett said he and his ability to "[come] up with a little bit of magic more often than not" would be a big loss.

=== Sheffield Wednesday ===
Maghoma signed a two-year contract with Championship club Sheffield Wednesday in June 2013. He made an eventful debut on the opening day of the 2013–14 season against newly relegated Queens Park Rangers. Coming into the match as a first-half substitute for Joe Mattock, Maghoma was booked for diving when the victim of what QPR's assistant manager agreed was a foul in the penalty area by the already-booked Joey Barton, and also shot against the post, as Sheffield Wednesday lost 2–1. He had missed some of pre-season training because of injury, and was not a regular in the team for the first few months of the season, but had a run in the starting eleven from late November, and scored his first goal in a 2–1 loss against Bournemouth. He also scored in a 4–1 win over Macclesfield Town in the FA Cup third round, and in a 2–0 win over Huddersfield Town in February 2014. His season effectively ended in March, when he was fouled by Wigan Athletic's goalkeeper and suffered knee damage that kept him out until the final match, in which he had ten minutes as a substitute. He finished with three goals from 30 appearances in all competitions, and hoped to make a greater impact in the season to come.

Maghoma started the 2014–15 season with an assist for Giles Coke's shot from distance as Wednesday beat Brighton & Hove Albion 1–0; Coke's goal was voted Wednesday's Goal of 2014. He scored his first goal of the season in a 3–0 League Cup win over Notts County. But after initially holding down the left-wing position once Michail Antonio left the club, he lost his place in the face of competition from Chris Maguire and new arrivals Royston Drenthe and Hallam Hope, and it took a "kick up the backside" from manager Stuart Gray to improve his performance in training and return him to the starting eleven. In February 2015, he provided the assists for all three Wednesday goals in a win away to Millwall, and he finished the season with 36 appearances, which included 28 league starts. Although he had hoped to earn a new contract with Wednesday, he was released at the end of the season.

=== Birmingham City ===
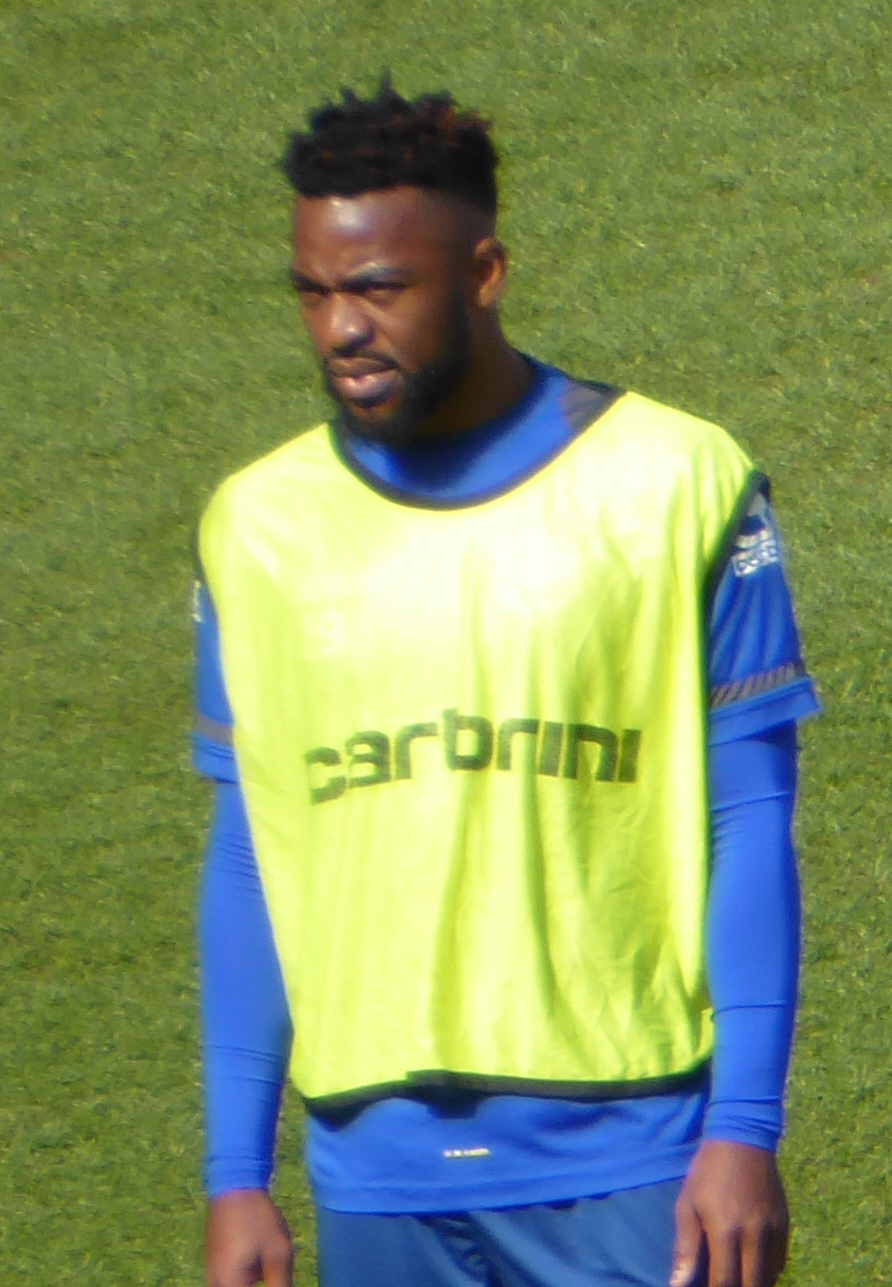
Maghoma with Birmingham City in 2015

Maghoma linked up again with former manager Gary Rowett at Championship club Birmingham City in June 2015, when he signed a two-year contract with the option of a further year. An unused substitute on the opening day of the season, he started the League Cup visit to Bristol Rovers three days later and scored the opening goal in a 2–1 win. His first league goal was the second of a 2–0 win at Milton Keynes Dons; having come on soon after half-time, he ran on to Clayton Donaldson's through pass and slid the ball past the goalkeeper. According to the Birmingham Mail's reporter, he made a significant impact on the game, "fast, direct and full of running – and took his goal with great composure". He became a regular in the team, either as a substitute or, especially after the transfer of Demarai Gray to Leicester City, in the starting eleven, and scored 6 goals from 44 appearances in all competitions. At the end of the season he agreed a contract extension to 2018, plus an option in the club's favour of another year.

Speaking in February 2016, Rowett said about Maghoma that "he's strong, he's quick, and he's got great balance. He can beat players, he can score goals, he can tackle, and he can defend", but that his ability meant that "he should be scoring ten goals a season and setting more goals up". He scored at Leeds United in Birmingham's first win of the 2016–17 season, and crossed for David Davis's goal against Norwich City and Lukas Jutkiewicz's late winner against Sheffield Wednesday. He was a regular starter for the first three months of the season, but played little during the next two because of a knee problem and a sickness virus. Under new manager Gianfranco Zola, Maghoma made three starts, in the second of which his decisively taken goal sparked a comeback from 2–0 down to draw with Barnsley, before spending January at the Africa Cup of Nations. He returned with a knee injury, but played rarely even when fit; Zola preferred not to use wingers. Harry Redknapp replaced Zola with at least six points needed from three matches to avoid relegation; Maghoma started all three. He worked hard in a losing cause against Aston Villa, won the corner that led to the first goal and won the penalty with which Birmingham beat Huddersfield Town 2–0, and no Birmingham player made more successful tackles in the win at Bristol City that kept them in the division.

Maghoma won Birmingham's Player of the Year and Players' Player of the Year awards for 2017–18.

After five years with the club, he was released when his contract expired at the end of the 2019–20 season.

=== East Bengal ===
Maghoma signed a one-year contract with Indian Super League club East Bengal on 19 October 2020. He scored his first goals for the club in a 3–2 loss to Hyderabad FC, and added another in a 3–1 win against Odisha FC.

=== Return to England ===
Northern Premier League Eastern Division club Spalding United, managed by former DR Congo international Gabriel Zakuani, announced the arrival of Maghoma in June 2021. However, it was reported locally that he was training with the club to regain fitness, and he made no competitive appearance for them.

In October 2021, Maghoma signed for National League South club Hemel Hempstead Town. He made his debut on 6 November as a second-half substitute in a 2–2 draw away to Dorking Wanderers, and made five more appearances.

Maghoma announced his retirement from football in October 2022.

== International career ==
Maghoma was called into the DR Congo squad for some post-season friendlies in May 2010 in Austria and Switzerland. He made his debut for his country's B team against Saudi Arabia's B team on 20 May, and scored. He made his senior debut during the same set of matches, as a second-half substitute, also against Saudi Arabia, but did not appear again until March 2015, in a friendly defeat against Iraq. He made his first competitive appearance for his country as a half-time substitute in the World Cup qualifier away to Burundi, which DR Congo won 3–2, and started the return match three days later, in which a 2–2 daw was enough for DR Congo to progress to the qualification group stage.

== Personal life ==
Maghoma's younger brothers, Christian and Paris, also became professional footballers.

== Career statistics ==
=== Club ===
Appearances and goals by club, season and competition
Club	Season	League			National cup (Note: Includes FA Cup)		League cup (Note: Includes Football League Cup / EFL Cup)		Other		Total	
Club	Season	Division	Apps	Goals	Apps	Goals	Apps	Goals	Apps	Goals	Apps	Goals
Burton Albion	2009–10	League Two	35	3	1	1	1	0	1 (Note: Appearance in Football League Trophy)	0	38	4
Burton Albion	2010–11	League Two	41	4	4	1	0	0	0	0	45	5
Burton Albion	2011–12	League Two	36	4	1	0	1	1	1	0	39	5
Burton Albion	2012–13	League Two	43	15	4	1	1	1	2 (Note: Appearances in League Two play-offs)	1	50	18
Burton Albion	Total		155	26	10	3	3	2	4	1	172	32
Sheffield Wednesday	2013–14	Championship	25	2	4	1	1	0	—		30	3
Sheffield Wednesday	2014–15	Championship	32	0	1	0	3	1	—		36	1
Sheffield Wednesday	Total		57	2	5	1	4	1	—		66	4
Birmingham City	2015–16	Championship	40	5	1	0	3	1	—		44	6
Birmingham City	2016–17	Championship	27	3	0	0	1	0	—		28	3
Birmingham City	2017–18	Championship	41	5	1	0	2	0	—		44	5
Birmingham City	2018–19	Championship	42	6	1	0	0	0	—		43	6
Birmingham City	2019–20	Championship	18	1	3	0	0	0	—		21	1
Birmingham City	Total		168	20	6	0	6	1	—		180	21
East Bengal	2020–21	Indian Super League	19	3	—		—		—		19	3
Hemel Hempstead Town	2021–22	National League South	4	0	—		—		2 (Note: One appearance in FA Trophy, one in Herts Senior Cup)	0	6	0
Career total			403	51	21	4	13	4	6	1	443	60

=== International ===
Appearances and goals by national team and year
National team	Year	Apps	Goals
DR Congo	2010	1	0
DR Congo	2015	5	0
DR Congo	2016	5	0
DR Congo	2017	6	0
DR Congo	2018	2	0
DR Congo	2019	6	0
Total		25	0

== Honours ==
Individual

- PFA Team of the Year: 2012–13 League Two
- Burton Albion Players' Player of the Season: 2012–13
- Birmingham City Player of the Season: 2017–18
- Birmingham City Players' Player of the Season: 2017–18
