= Tony James (Welsh footballer, born 1978) =

Welsh footballer

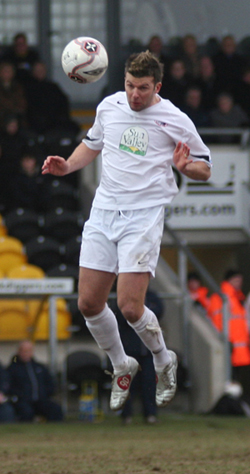
- James in action for Hereford United in 2006

Personal information
- Full name: Anthony James
- Date of birth: 9 October 1978 (age 48)
- Place of birth: Abergavenny, Wales
- Position: Centre back

Youth career
- 1996–1998: West Bromwich Albion

Senior career*
Years	Team	Apps	(Gls)
1998–2006	Hereford United	273	(16)
2006–2007	Weymouth	32	(3)
2007–2012	Burton Albion	159	(1)
2010	→ Hereford United (loan)	6	(0)
2012–2014	Newport County	47	(2)
2015	Hereford	4	(0)
Total		521	(22)

International career
- Wales Semi-Pro
- * Club domestic league appearances and goals

Anthony James (born 9 October 1978) is a Welsh former footballer who last played as a centre-back for English club Hereford.

== Career ==
Born in Cwmbran, James started his professional career at West Bromwich Albion where he played in the reserves. He then moved to Hereford United.

He soon established himself as a first choice centre back, partnering Hereford captain Ian Wright. He was voted Player of the Year for the 2002–03 and 2003–04 seasons, in the latter he was an ever-present. When Wright left the club in 2003, James took over the captaincy and led the club to runner-up spot in the Conference in three successive seasons. He was also the regular penalty taker for Hereford, his most notable penalty being the opening goal in the televised 9–0 win over Dagenham & Redbridge in 2004.

In the first half of the 2000s he was widely regarded as one of the highest performing central defenders in the Conference, with Peter Shreeves stating that he was the best defender in the Conference. James also represented his country at semi-pro international level.

By 2006 injuries had cost him his first team place to Dean Beckwith and James did not play a part in the last nine games of the season, including the play-off final which saw Hereford win promotion to the Football League. His significant contribution to the club was recognised when he was invited onto the rostrum to lift the trophy with team captain Tamika Mkandawire. He holds the record for the most Conference appearances by a Hereford United player and is ranked 18th on Hereford's all-time list of most appearances with 322 (20 goals).

James moved to Weymouth where he was to spend just one season at the promotion-chasing outfit, captaining the club and scoring three penalties. When financial troubles hit the Terras, James moved to Burton Albion. A knee injury sustained at the start of the season limited his appearances but he returned to first team action against Altrincham. He was part of the 2008–09 Conference National winning side and signed a new contract with Burton in May 2009. James rejoined Hereford United on a month's loan in October 2010.

James was released by Burton at the end of the 2011–12 season and in June 2012 he signed for Conference National team Newport County. In the 2012–13 season he was part of the Newport team that finished 3rd in the league, reaching the Conference National playoffs. Newport County won the playoff final versus Wrexham at Wembley Stadium 2–0 to return to the Football League after a 25-year absence with promotion to Football League Two. James was selected as Newport County's Player of the Year for the 2012–13 season.

James retired from playing in May 2014 and was appointed strength and conditioning coach at Newport County.

On 2 June 2015, it was confirmed that James had agreed terms with Hereford United's phoenix club, Hereford.

== Personal ==
Tony James is the father of Wales international footballer Jordan James.

== Career statistics ==
As of match played 31 August 2015

Appearances and goals by club, season and competition
Club	Season	League			FA Cup		League Cup		Other		Total	
Club	Season	Division	Apps	Goals	Apps	Goals	Apps	Goals	Apps	Goals	Apps	Goals
Hereford United	1998–99	Football Conference	1	0	0	0	—		0	0	1	0
Hereford United	1999–2000	Football Conference	36	2	4	0	—		1 (Note: Appearance(s) in Conference League Cup)	0	41	2
Hereford United	2000–01	Football Conference	33	0	0	0	—		4 (Note: One appearance in Conference League Cup; three appearances in FA Trophy)	0	37	0
Hereford United	2001–02	Football Conference	41	1	2	0	—		0	0	43	1
Hereford United	2002–03	Football Conference	39	1	1	0	—		1 (Note: Appearance(s) in Football League Trophy)	0	41	1
Hereford United	2003–04	Football Conference	42	9	1	0	—		4 (Note: One appearance in Football League Trophy; one appearance in FA Trophy; two appearances in Football Conference play-offs)	0	47	9
Hereford United	2004–05	Conference National	30	1	1	0	—		3 (Note: Two appearances in Football League Trophy; one appearance in Conference National play-offs)	0	34	1
Hereford United	2005–06	Conference National	23	1	2	0	—		2 (Note: Appearance(s) in FA Trophy)	0	27	1
Hereford United	Total		245	15	11	0			15	0	271	15
Weymouth	2006–07	Conference National	32	3	1	0	—		0	0	33	3
Burton Albion	2007–08	Conference Premier	30	0	3	0	—		3 (Note: One appearance in FA Trophy; two appearances in Conference Premier play-offs)	0	36	0
Burton Albion	2008–09	Conference Premier	28	0	0	0	—		1	0	29	0
Burton Albion	2009–10	League Two	42	1	2	0	0	0	1	0	45	1
Burton Albion	2010–11	League Two	27	0	2	0	1	0	0	0	30	0
Burton Albion	2011–12	League Two	30	0	1	0	1	0	0	0	32	0
Burton Albion	Total		157	1	8	0	2	0	5	0	172	1
Hereford United (loan)	2010–11	League Two	6	0	—		—		1	0	7	0
Newport County	2012–13	Conference Premier	41	2	0	0	—		3 (Note: Appearance(s) in Conference Premier play-offs)	0	44	2
Newport County	2013–14	League Two	6	0	0	0	1	0	1	0	8	0
Newport County	Total		47	2	0	0	1	0	4	0	52	2
Hereford	2015–16	Midland League Premier Division	6	0	—		—		—		6	0
Career total			493	21	20	0	3	0	25	0	541	21

== Honours ==
Hereford United

- Conference National play-offs: 2005–06

Burton Albion

- Conference National: 2008–09

Newport County

- Conference National play-off winners: 2012–13
