= John McGrath (Irish footballer) =

Irish footballer and manager

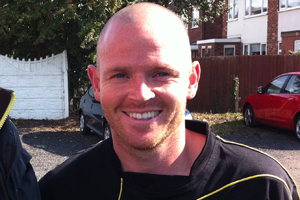
- McGrath in 2011

Personal information
- Full name: John Matthew McGrath
- Date of birth: 27 March 1980 (age 46)
- Place of birth: Limerick, Ireland
- Height: 5 ft 10 in (1.78 m)
- Position: Midfielder

Team information
- Current team: FC Halifax Town (manager)

Youth career
- 1996–1999: Belvedere
- 1999–2001: Aston Villa

Senior career*
Years	Team	Apps	(Gls)
2001–2003	Aston Villa	2	(0)
2002–2003	→ Dagenham & Redbridge (loan)	22	(2)
2003–2005	Doncaster Rovers	11	(0)
2004	→ Shrewsbury Town (loan)	8	(0)
2005	Kidderminster Harriers	19	(0)
2005	Limerick		(1)
2006	Weymouth	13	(3)
2006–2007	Tamworth	42	(3)
2007–2013	Burton Albion	215	(14)
2013	→ York City (loan)	9	(0)
2013–2014	Alfreton Town	23	(1)
2015–2022	Mickleover		
Total		364	(24)

International career
2000	Republic of Ireland U21	5	(0)

Managerial career
- 2016–2024: Mickleover
- 2024–2026: Buxton
- 2026–: FC Halifax Town
- * Club domestic league appearances and goals as of 04:16, 5 October 2016 (UTC)

John Matthew McGrath (born 27 March 1980) is an Irish former footballer and manager who played as a midfielder. He is currently manager of National League club FC Halifax Town.

== Club career ==
Born in Limerick, County Limerick, McGrath played local schoolboy football with Templeglantine and Corbally, before joining Belvedere in 1996. He was part of the team that won an unprecedented FAI Youth Cup, Leinster Youths Cup and DDSL U-18 Premier League treble. He joined English Premier League club Aston Villa on 3 September 1999 following a two-week trial. After making only two appearances he went out on loan to Football Conference side Dagenham & Redbridge in November 2002.

McGrath was then signed by Doncaster Rovers on 10 July 2003 in time for the start of their first campaign back in the Football League after being promoted from the Football Conference. He made 14 appearances for Doncaster as they won the Third Division title. He spent two months on loan at Shrewsbury Town, before signing for Kidderminster Harriers in January 2005. In May 2005, McGrath was released by Kidderminster, having been sent off in his last game, away to Northampton Town on 7 May.

After trials with York City, Darlington, Limerick and Scunthorpe United, McGrath joined hometown club Limerick, playing in the League of Ireland First Division, for the remainder of the 2005 season in August 2005, scoring his only goal against Athlone Town on 7 October. He left the club to return to England with Conference South side Weymouth for the rest of the 2005–06 season in January 2006. He made 13 appearances and scored 3 goals for Weymouth as they won the Conference South championship.

McGrath was only at Weymouth for a short period before joining Conference National side Tamworth in July 2006. On 10 May 2007, McGrath and Tamworth teammate Jake Edwards joined local rivals Burton Albion following Tamworth's relegation to the Conference North. His first season at Burton saw the club make the play-off semi-finals after he had played in 60 games and scored 9 goals, being named the club's Player of the Year. He signed a new one-year contract with the club in May 2008, despite having talks with York City manager Colin Walker. McGrath made 48 appearances and scored 6 goals for Burton during the 2008–09 season, as the team won the Conference Premier title and so gained promotion to League Two. He signed a new contract with Burton in May 2009.

McGrath signed for League Two rivals York City on an initial one-month loan on 12 February 2013, making his debut later that day in a 0–0 draw at home to Gillingham. Having made five appearances for York, the loan was extended until the end of the 2012–13 season on 7 March 2013. He was sent back to Burton on 4 April 2013 having been deemed surplus to requirements by new manager Nigel Worthington. He had made 9 appearances for York. He played for Burton in both legs of their 5–4 aggregate play-off semi-final defeat to Bradford City, and finished the season with 11 appearances for the club, before being released on 6 May 2013.

After spending much of pre-season on trial with Alfreton Town, McGrath signed a one-year contract with the Conference Premier club on 3 August 2013. His season was ended by a knee injury sustained during a 3–2 win away to Wrexham on 26 December 2013. He had made 26 appearances and scored one goal for Alfreton in the 2013–14 season.

In 2015 McGrath joined Northern Premier League side Mickleover Sports, and on 28 April 2016 he was named the new player-manager.

== International career ==
McGrath made his debut for the Republic of Ireland national under-21 team as a half-time substitute for Peter Murphy in a 2–1 home defeat to Greece on 25 April 2000. He made his first and only start for the under-21s in a 2–0 defeat away to the Netherlands on 1 September 2000. He finished his under-21 career with five caps, all of which were amassed during 2000.

== Managerial career ==
In May 2024, McGrath was appointed manager of National League North club Buxton Prior to his departure in May 2026, he led the club to consecutive play-off finishes and reached the Second Round of the FA Cup.

On 19 May 2026, McGrath was appointed manager of National League club FC Halifax Town.

== Personal life ==
His son Jay McGrath is also a professional footballer.

Both he, and his son are graduates of Staffordshire University having studied Sports Journalism degrees.

== Career statistics ==
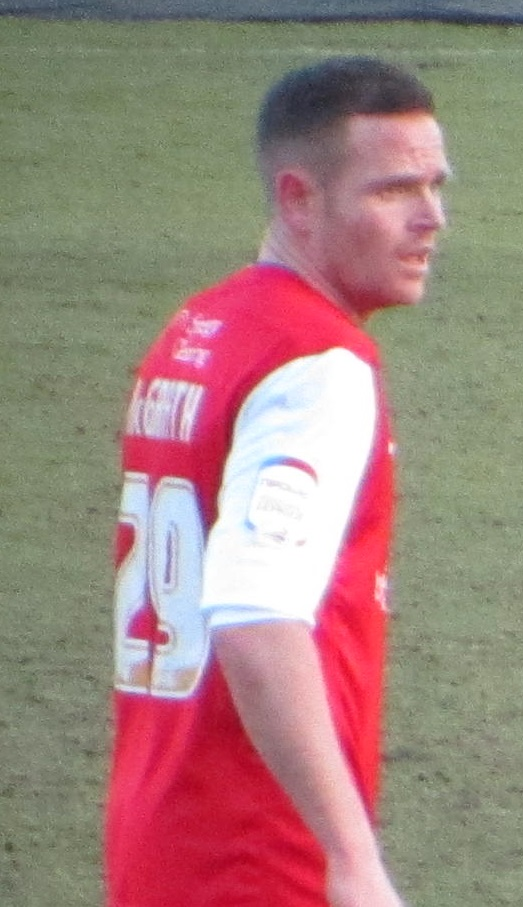
McGrath playing for York City in 2013

As of match played 26 December 2013.

Club statistics
Club	Season	League			FA Cup		League Cup		Other		Total	
Club	Season	Division	Apps	Goals	Apps	Goals	Apps	Goals	Apps	Goals	Apps	Goals
Aston Villa	1999–2000	FA Premier League	0	0	0	0	0	0	—		0	0
Aston Villa	2000–01	FA Premier League	2	0	0	0	0	0	0	0	2	0
Aston Villa	Total		2	0	0	0	0	0	0	0	2	0
Dagenham & Redbridge (loan)	2002–03	Football Conference	22	2	4	0	—		5 (Note: Two appearances in FA Trophy, three in Football Conference play-offs)	0	31	2
Doncaster Rovers	2003–04	Third Division	11	0	1	0	1	0	1 (Note: Appearance in Football League Trophy)	0	14	0
Shrewsbury Town (loan)	2004–05	League Two	8	0	0	0	0	0	0	0	8	0
Kidderminster Harriers	2004–05	League Two	19	0	0	0	0	0	0	0	19	0
Weymouth	2005–06	Conference South	13	3	0	0	—		0	0	13	3
Tamworth	2006–07	Conference National	42	3	4	2	—		2 (Note: Appearance(s) in FA Trophy)	0	48	5
Burton Albion	2007–08	Conference Premier	46	4	4	2	—		10 (Note: Six appearances and two goals in FA Trophy, two appearances and one goal in Conference League Cup, two appearances in Conference Premier play-offs)	3	60	9
Burton Albion	2008–09	Conference Premier	46	6	0	0	—		2	0	48	6
Burton Albion	2009–10	League Two	45	1	1	0	1	0	1	1	48	2
Burton Albion	2010–11	League Two	41	3	4	0	1	0	0	0	46	3
Burton Albion	2011–12	League Two	31	0	1	0	1	0	1	0	34	0
Burton Albion	2012–13	League Two	6	0	3	0	0	0	2 (Note: Appearances in League Two play-offs)	0	11	0
Burton Albion	Total		330	22	22	4	4	0	24	4	380	30
York City (loan)	2012–13	League Two	9	0	0	0	0	0	0	0	9	0
Alfreton Town	2013–14	Conference Premier	23	1	2	1	—		1	0	26	1
Career total			364	23	24	5	4	0	25	4	417	31

== Managerial statistics ==
As of match played 21 November 2026

Managerial record by team and tenure
Team	From	To	Record					Ref.
Team	From	To	P	W	D	L	Win %	Ref.
Mickleover	28 April 2016	6 May 2024	330	140	60	130	42.4	
Buxton	6 May 2024	19 May 2026	110	54	15	41	49.1	
FC Halifax Town	19 May 2026	Present	24	12	4	8	50.0	
Total			464	206	79	179	44.4	—

== Honours ==
Doncaster Rovers

- Football League Third Division: 2003–04

Weymouth

- Conference South: 2005–06

Burton Albion

- Conference Premier: 2008–09

Individual

- Burton Albion Player of the Year: 2007–08
