= Jimmy Phillips (footballer, born 1989) =

English footballer

Personal information
- Full name: James Peter Phillips
- Date of birth: 20 September 1989 (age 37)
- Place of birth: Stoke-on-Trent, England
- Height: 5 ft 7 in (1.70 m)
- Position: Midfielder

Team information
- Current team: Kidsgrove Athletic

Youth career
- 2006–2009: Stoke City

Senior career*
Years	Team	Apps	(Gls)
2008–2009	Stoke City	0	(0)
2008	→ Alfreton Town (loan)	1	(0)
2008	→ Stafford Rangers (loan)	7	(1)
2009–2015	Burton Albion	121	(3)
2015	→ Alfreton Town (loan)	5	(0)
2015–2016	Gateshead	19	(3)
2016	→ Macclesfield Town (loan)	3	(0)
2016	→ Altrincham (loan)	4	(0)
2017–2019	Mickleover Sports		
2019–	Kidsgrove Athletic		
- * Club domestic league appearances and goals as of 17:45, 8 May 2016 (UTC)

James Peter Phillips (born 20 September 1989) is an English footballer who plays as a midfielder for Kidsgrove Athletic.

== Career ==
=== Stoke City ===
He started his career at Stoke City but after loan spells at Alfreton Town and Stafford Rangers he was released at the end of the 2008–09 season. It was then that he was snapped up by Burton manager Paul Peschisolido.

=== Burton Albion ===
He made his debut on the first day of the 2009–10 season, starting in the 3–1 defeat to Shrewsbury Town. He scored his first goal for Burton in a first round League Cup defeat at Reading on 11 August 2009. He scored his first Football League goal in a 2–1 win over Grimsby Town on 10 October 2009. His goal turned out to be the winning goal for Burton. He scored his second league goal for the club, 4 years after his first, in a 2–0 win over Torquay United on 22 October 2013. His fourth goal for the club came against Bournemouth in the FA Cup on 14 January 2014.

On 27 March, Phillips was loaned out to Conference Premier side Alfreton Town until the end of the season. He played five times for Alfreton as they suffered relegation to the Conference North. Phillips was released by Burton at the end of the 2014–15 season.

=== Gateshead ===
Phillips joined National League side Gateshead on 7 July 2015 on a one-year contract. He made his debut on 8 August in a 2–1 win over Aldershot Town and scored his first goal on 12 September in a 2–1 win over Eastleigh.

On 17 February 2016, Phillips joined Macclesfield Town on a one-month loan. Phillips made three appearances for Macclesfield Town before joining Altrincham on loan for the remainder of the season on 18 March 2016.

On 3 May 2016, it was announced that Phillips had been released by Gateshead. He remained without club until August 2017, where he joined Mickleover Sports. He played for the club until the summer 2019, where he joined Kidsgrove Athletic.

== Career statistics ==
As of match played 5 April 2016

Appearances and goals by club, season and competition
Club	Season	League			FA Cup		League Cup		Other		Total	
Club	Season	Division	Apps	Goals	Apps	Goals	Apps	Goals	Apps	Goals	Apps	Goals
Stoke City	2008–09	Premier League	0	0	0	0	0	0	0	0	0	0
Stoke City	Total		0	0	0	0	0	0	0	0	0	0
Burton Albion	2009–10	League Two	24	1	1	0	1	1	1	0	27	2
Burton Albion	2010–11	League Two	23	0	2	0	1	0	1	0	27	0
Burton Albion	2011–12	League Two	33	0	1	0	1	0	1	0	36	0
Burton Albion	2012–13	League Two	7	0	1	0	0	0	1	0	9	0
Burton Albion	2013–14	League Two	33	2	3	1	1	0	0	0	37	3
Burton Albion	2014–15	League Two	1	0	0	0	0	0	0	0	1	0
Burton Albion	Total		121	3	8	1	4	1	4	0	137	4
Alfreton Town (loan)	2014–15	Conference Premier	5	0	0	0	0	0	0	0	5	0
Gateshead	2015–16	National League	19	3	1	0	0	0	0	0	20	3
Macclesfield Town (loan)	2015–16	National League	3	0	0	0	0	0	0	0	3	0
Altrincham (loan)	2015–16	National League	4	0	0	0	0	0	0	0	4	0
Career total			152	6	9	0	4	1	4	0	169	7
