= Kevin Poole =

English footballer (born 1963)

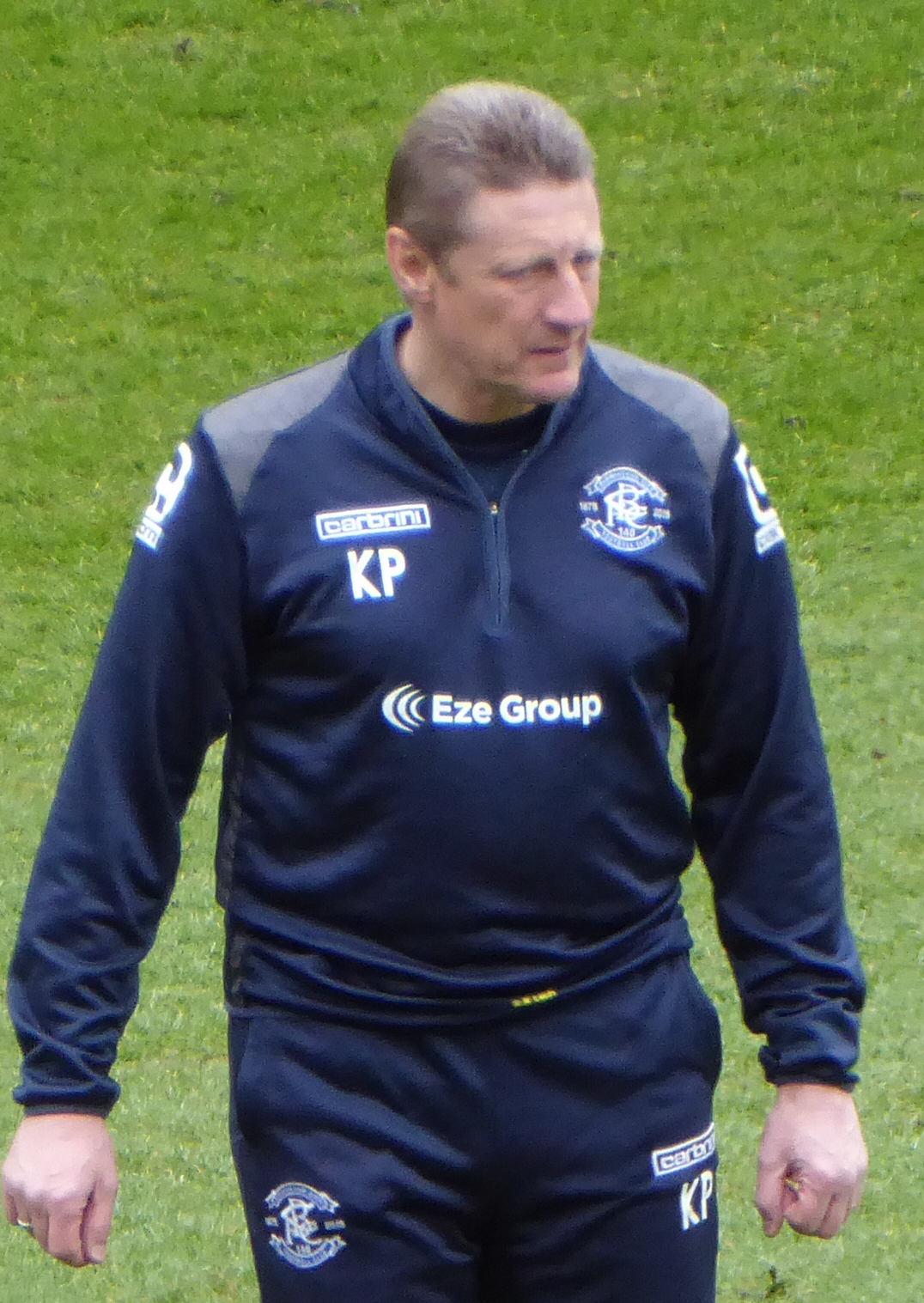
- Poole with Birmingham City in 2016

Personal information
- Full name: Kevin Poole
- Date of birth: 21 July 1963 (age 63)
- Place of birth: Bromsgrove, England
- Height: 5 ft 10 in (1.78 m)
- Position: Goalkeeper

Team information
- Current team: Solihull Moors (goalkeeping coach)

Youth career
- Aston Villa

Senior career*
Years	Team	Apps	(Gls)
1981–1987	Aston Villa	28	(0)
1984	→ Northampton Town (loan)	3	(0)
1987–1991	Middlesbrough	34	(0)
1991	→ Hartlepool United (loan)	12	(0)
1991–1997	Leicester City	163	(0)
1997–2001	Birmingham City	56	(0)
2001–2005	Bolton Wanderers	5	(0)
2005–2006	Derby County	6	(0)
2006–2014	Burton Albion	123	(0)
Total		431	(0)

Managerial career
- 2012: Burton Albion (caretaker)
- * Club domestic league appearances and goals

Kevin Poole (born 21 July 1963) is an English football coach and former professional footballer who is the goalkeeping coach at Solihull Moors.

During a long career, Poole played in the Premier League for Leicester City and Bolton Wanderers, having also appeared in England's First Division for Aston Villa before the formation of the Premiership. He also featured for Northampton Town, Middlesbrough, Hartlepool United, Birmingham City and Derby County, before signing for Burton Albion in 2006, aged 43.

Latterly employed as goalkeeping coach in addition to being registered as a player, Poole made his final appearance for Burton in 2010. He had an interim spell as manager in 2012, when he retired from playing at the age of 48; however, he later re-registered himself as a player on two occasions due to goalkeeping crises at the club, making Poole one of the few players in English football ever to be registered to a professional club at the age of 50. He has gone on to hold similar roles at Kidderminster Harriers, Birmingham City and Derby County.

== Playing career ==
=== Aston Villa ===
Poole was born in Bromsgrove, Worcestershire. His first club was Aston Villa, whom he initially joined as an apprentice, turning professional in 1981. He was Villa's third choice keeper behind Jimmy Rimmer and Nigel Spink when they won the European Cup in 1982. He made his debut in the Football League while on loan at Northampton Town in late 1984, and played the first of his 32 games for Villa later in the 1984–85 season.

=== Middlesbrough ===
Poole moved to Middlesbrough, newly promoted back to the Second Division, in 1987, and played 42 first-team games in four seasons with the club. He was a member of the squad that helped Boro reach the 1990 Full Members' Cup Final, but Stephen Pears was preferred in goal at Wembley as they lost to Chelsea. He spent the last part of 1990–91 on loan at Hartlepool United, where he started their last 12 games of the season, keeping five clean sheets and never being on the losing side, to clinch promotion from the Fourth Division.

=== Leicester City ===
In 1991, Poole signed for Leicester City and went on to make 194 appearances in all competitions for the club between 1991 and 1997. He was part of the Leicester side that won promotion to the Premier League in 1994 and again in 1996, but subsequently lost his position to Kasey Keller.

=== Birmingham City ===
Poole moved to Birmingham City in August 1997, achieving a regular place thanks to an injury to Ian Bennett in September 1998. Bennett, who had regained his place, was ruled out for the season in March 2000, but Poole himself was injured only days later, and played just once more for Birmingham's first team before he was released in May 2001. He returned on a short-term contract in September of that year while Bennett was injured, and played in one League Cup game.

=== Bolton Wanderers ===
Poole signed for Bolton Wanderers in October 2001. He spent four years at the club, mainly as backup to Jussi Jääskeläinen. During the 2003–04 season, he was part of the Bolton squad that reached the League Cup final, and was an unused substitute in the final against his old club Middlesbrough. While at Bolton, Poole often trained at West Bromwich Albion with Bolton's goalkeeping coach Fred Barber, due to it being nearer to his Midlands home.

=== Derby County ===
Phil Brown signed Poole as a goalkeeping coach for Derby County in July 2005; Brown had been assistant manager of Poole's old club Bolton until that summer. Although at the age of 42 he was also registered as a player, this was initially intended only for emergencies; however he was unexpectedly promoted to first choice for a spell due to poor form and injuries affecting young goalkeepers Lee Camp and Lee Grant in a difficult season for the East Midlands club, who narrowly avoided relegation to League One. The 42-year-old Poole played seven times for the first team before returning to coaching duties. He was released in May 2006 after Brown's management team were axed from Derby County by new manager Billy Davies.

=== Burton Albion ===
Even at the age of 43, Poole was still not ready to hang up his gloves. After a trial with Walsall, Poole signed for Conference National club Burton Albion on a match-to-match basis in August 2006. He kept a clean sheet on his debut a day later at Morecambe, and continued to play until the end of the 2006–07 season, when he was named Burton's Player of the Season. Poole then helped Albion to reach the playoff semi-finals of the Conference National the following season, before playing a key role in the 2008–09 title-winning side, and coming runner-up to Jake Buxton as Player of the Season. By now, he was 46 years old.

Poole signed a new contract in June 2009, which made him the oldest player active in the Football League at the age of 46, and one of the oldest of all time. He was also the club's new goalkeeping coach. Poole made six appearances in Burton's first season in League Two, keeping a clean sheet in the last match of the season, a 3–0 victory over Grimsby Town.

Poole signed a new contract for the 2010–11 season, and made an appearance as a 47-year-old in a Football League Trophy match against Rotherham in October 2010. This would be the final appearance of his career; he signed a further one-year deal for 2011–12, and would turn 48 years old before the start of the new season. Having made no appearances during 2011–12, Poole announced on 26 April that he would retire from his 32-year playing career, aged 48, at the end of the season, he had been the oldest professional player in England at the time of his retirement However, because of injuries to Stuart Tomlinson and Ross Atkins, he re-registered as a player in October 2012 to provide cover for Dean Lyness and on-loan Mark Oxley, alongside his coaching role.

Poole again returned to the squad, aged 50, in October 2013 after an injury to Lyness; he took the number 13 shirt, and appeared on the substitutes' bench for a match at Wycombe Wanderers on 5 October 2013. He returned to the first team once again in late November as first-choice goalkeeper Jordan Pickford was recalled by Sunderland.

== Coaching career ==
Poole and Gary Rowett were put in temporary charge of Burton following Paul Peschisolido's sacking on 17 March 2012. He reverted to a goalkeeping coach role when Rowett was appointed as permanent manager. When Rowett was appointed Birmingham City manager in October 2014, Poole accompanied him as goalkeeping coach. Rowett and his staff, Poole included, were sacked in December 2016.

Rowett was appointed Derby County manager on 14 March 2017, with Poole again joining him as goalkeeping coach. When Rowett moved on to Stoke City, Poole remained at Derby until July 2018 when new manager Frank Lampard brought in Shay Given as goalkeeping coach. In late November, he was appointed goalkeeping coach at National League club Kidderminster Harriers. He joined Solihull Moors in September 2020 as a goalkeeping coach.

== Honours ==
Leicester City

- Football League First Division play-offs: 1994, 1996
- Football League Cup: 1996–97

Birmingham City

- Football League Cup runner-up: 2000–01

Bolton Wanderers

- Football League Cup runner-up: 2003–04

Burton Albion

- Conference Premier: 2008–09
