= Jack Dyer (footballer, born 1991) =

English footballer

Personal information
- Full name: Jack Robert Dyer
- Date of birth: 11 December 1991 (age 34)
- Place of birth: Sutton Coldfield, England
- Position: Midfielder

Team information
- Current team: Tamworth

Youth career
- –2010: Aston Villa

Senior career*
Years	Team	Apps	(Gls)
2010–2014	Burton Albion	54	(1)
2014	→ Kidderminster Harriers (loan)	2	(0)
2014–2015	Nuneaton Town	13	(1)
2015–2016	Hednesford Town		
2016–	Tamworth	0	(0)
- * Club domestic league appearances and goals as of 23:10, 20 September 2015 (UTC)

Jack Robert Dyer (born 11 December 1991) is an English professional footballer who plays for Conference North side Tamworth, where he plays as a midfielder.

Dyer was brought up in the small town of Aldridge in the West Midlands.

== Playing career ==
=== Burton Albion ===
Born in Sutton Coldfield, Dyer came through Aston Villa's youth system and was signed by Burton Albion on 23 July 2010. He made his professional debut on 26 March 2011, starting in their 3–0 away loss to Oxford United in League Two. Dyer scored his first goal against Barnet in a 6–3 win on 29 October 2011.

=== Kidderminster Harriers (loan) ===
On 1 January he went on a months loan to Kidderminster Harriers where he made 2 league appearances as well as 3 FA Cup appearances, 2 substitute appearances in the 3rd round against Peterborough United and playing 82 minutes in the narrow 4th round 1–0 loss to Sunderland. On 31 January he was re-called with immediate effect.

=== Tamworth ===
On 4 March 2016 Dyer was one of four players to join Conference North side Tamworth, he signed a deal running until the end of the season, and was joined on the same day by Kaid Mohamed and Ashley Carter, who joined on loan from Eastleigh and Wolverhampton Wanderers respectively, as well as youth player Michael Wright. Dyer was named on the bench the following day for a fixture away at Stockport County, but didn't make it on to the pitch.
