= Aaron Webster (footballer) =

English footballer

Personal information
- Full name: Aaron Denton Webster
- Date of birth: 19 December 1980 (age 45)
- Place of birth: Derby, England
- Position: Left back

Senior career*
Years	Team	Apps	(Gls)
1998–2013	Burton Albion	477	(79)
2013	Ilkeston	19	(7)
2013–2014	Mickleover Sports	15	(4)
2014–2015	Basford United	16	(4)
2018	Stapenhill	0	(0)
Total		527	(94)

Managerial career
- 2017–2018: Belper Town
- * Club domestic league appearances and goals

Aaron Denton Webster (born 19 December 1980) is an English former professional footballer who spent the majority of his career with Burton Albion.

== Playing career ==
Webster was part of the Burton Albion first team, after progressing from the youth team in 1998. He became one of the most capped players in the club's history, making 591 appearances in all competitions and scoring 101 goals during his 15 years at the club. After leaving The Brewers, he played for both Ilkeston and Mickleover Sports briefly before joining Basford United in 2014. On 10 October 2018 he joined Stapenhill FC as a player for a brief spell.

== Coaching career ==
After retiring he worked at the Burton Albion Community Trust as football and education first-team manager. In December 2017 he was appointed manager of Belper Town. However, he was sacked by the club in April 2018 after the club won only five times in 25 matches.

== Career statistics ==
As of 10 November 2013

Club	Season	League			FA Cup		League Cup		Other		Total	
Club	Season	Division	Apps	Goals	Apps	Goals	Apps	Goals	Apps	Goals	Apps	Goals
Burton Albion	1998–99	Southern League Premier Division	18	1	0	0	—		0	0	18	1
Burton Albion	1999–2000	Southern League Premier Division	24	2	2	0	—		0	0	26	2
Burton Albion	2000–01	Southern League Premier Division	33	8	2	0	—		0	0	35	8
Burton Albion	2001–02	Northern Premier League Premier Division	33	10	1	0	—		3 (Note: Appearance(s) in FA Trophy)	1	37	11
Burton Albion	2002–03	Football Conference	40	4	3	1	—		0	0	43	5
Burton Albion	2003–04	Football Conference	34	7	2	0	—		1	2	37	9
Burton Albion	2004–05	Conference National	38	0	1	0	—		2	0	41	0
Burton Albion	2005–06	Conference National	34	8	3	0	—		0	0	37	8
Burton Albion	2006–07	Conference National	36	8	0	0	—		0	0	36	8
Burton Albion	2007–08	Conference National	39	6	3	0	—		0	0	42	6
Burton Albion	2008–09	Conference National	38	7	1	0	—		1	2	40	9
Burton Albion	2009–10	League Two	24	4	2	0	0	0	0	0	26	4
Burton Albion	2010–11	League Two	42	11	4	2	1	0	0	0	47	13
Burton Albion	2011–12	League Two	35	3	0	0	1	0	0	0	36	3
Burton Albion	2012–13	League Two	9	0	2	0	2	1	1 (Note: Appearance(s) in Football League Trophy)	0	14	1
Burton Albion	Total		477	79	26	3	4	1	8	5	515	88
Ilkeston	2013–14	Northern Premier League Premier Division	19	7	1	1	—		1	0	21	8
Career total			496	86	27	4	4	1	9	5	536	96

== Personal life ==
In 2014, with a potential end to his career in sight, Webster planned to open a new sports bar in Burton on Trent. He said: "Football doesn't last forever, so it's a business venture I'm interested in pursuing. We were looking at a few different venues but this is the one I'd had an eye on for a while." Webster has now returned to Burton Albion in a coaching role with the club's youth teams.

== Honours ==
- Conference National: 2008–09
- Northern Premier League: 2001–02
