= Cleveland Taylor =

Footballer (born 1983)

Personal information
- Full name: Cleveland Kenneth Wayne Taylor
- Date of birth: 9 September 1983 (age 43)
- Place of birth: Leicester, England
- Height: 1.80 m (5 ft 11 in)
- Position: Right winger

Senior career*
Years	Team	Apps	(Gls)
2000–2004	Bolton Wanderers	0	(0)
2002	→ Exeter City (loan)	3	(0)
2003	→ Scarborough (loan)	11	(4)
2004	→ Scunthorpe United (loan)	11	(0)
2004–2008	Scunthorpe United	163	(14)
2008–2009	Carlisle United	61	(3)
2009–2010	Brentford	12	(1)
2010	→ Burton Albion (loan)	24	(4)
2010–2011	St Johnstone	21	(1)
2011–2013	Burton Albion	53	(3)
2013	→ Grimsby Town (loan)	8	(1)
2013–2014	Harrogate Town	42	(4)
2014	→ Corby Town (loan)	9	(1)
2014–2016	Corby Town	79	(6)
2016–2017	Barwell		
2017	Matlock Town		
2017	Coalville Town		
2018–2020	Stamford	22	(0)
2020–2021	Quorn	2	(0)

International career
- Jamaica U20
- Jamaica U23

Managerial career
- 2020–2021: Quorn (player-manager)
- * Club domestic league appearances and goals as of 16:02, 14 October 2021 (UTC)

Cleveland Kenneth Wayne Taylor (born 9 September 1983) is a football manager and former professional player

As a player he was a forward and winger. He played as a professional for Bolton Wanderers, Exeter City, Scarborough, Scunthorpe United, Carlisle United, Brentford, St Johnstone, Burton Albion and Grimsby Town before moving into non-league football with Harrogate Town, Corby Town, Barwell, Matlock Town, Coalville Town, Stamford and Quorn. Born in England, he represented Jamaica internationally at youth level U20 and U21.

== Club career ==
Born in Leicester, Leicestershire, Taylor began his career at Premier League club Bolton Wanderers as a youngster in 2001, but his chances were limited and he made just two substitute appearances for them, both in the FA Cup. He was subsequently loaned out for spells at both Exeter City and Scarborough. He left Bolton Wanderers in 2003 and joined Scunthorpe United permanently, he went on to make 96 appearances at The Iron, scoring 12 goals in the process. He played a part in Scunthorpe's success during the 2006–07 season when they won promotion to the Championship. Taylor was one of the scorers for Scunthorpe United as they comfortably beat Carlisle United 3–0 on the last day of the 2006–07 season. His chances were limited during the first half of the 2007–2008 season, and Taylor stated he would not sign any contract extension offered by Scunthorpe. This alerted several clubs, but it was the Brunton Park club that caught Taylor's eye.

Taylor made his Carlisle United début against Walsall at Brunton Park on 3 February 2008, a game that Carlisle came back from 1–0 down to win 2–1. Taylor then went on to score his first goal for the Blues against Southend United which turned out to be the winning goal as Carlisle ended up 2–1 winners.

On 13 August 2009, Taylor was announced as a Brentford player for an undisclosed fee, becoming Andy Scott's 12th signing of the summer. He scored his first and only goal for Brentford in a 1–1 draw with Southampton on 22 August 2009.

Taylor joined Burton Albion on loan until the end of the season on 14 January 2010.

On 1 July 2010, Taylor signed for Perth-based St Johnstone. He scored his first and only goal for St Johnstone in a 1–1 draw with Kilmarnock on 15 January 2011.

Taylor joined Burton Albion on a two-year contract after his release from St Johnstone. On 28 March 2013, Taylor joined Grimsby Town on loan for the remainder of the 2012–13 season. Taylor was released by Burton at the end of the 2012–13 season.

In July 2013 he joined Southend United on trial. In August 2013 he signed for Harrogate Town, and after a loan spell with Corby Town he joined them permanently during the 2014 off-season. He subsequently played for Barwell, Matlock Town, Coalville Town, Stamford and Quorn, player-managing the latter club.

== International career ==
Taylor has represented Jamaica at under-20 and under-23 (Olympic) levels.

== Personal life ==
As of May 2020, Taylor was living and working near Quorn, Leicestershire.

== Honours ==
Scunthorpe United

- Football League One: 2006–07
