= Paul Boertien =

English footballer

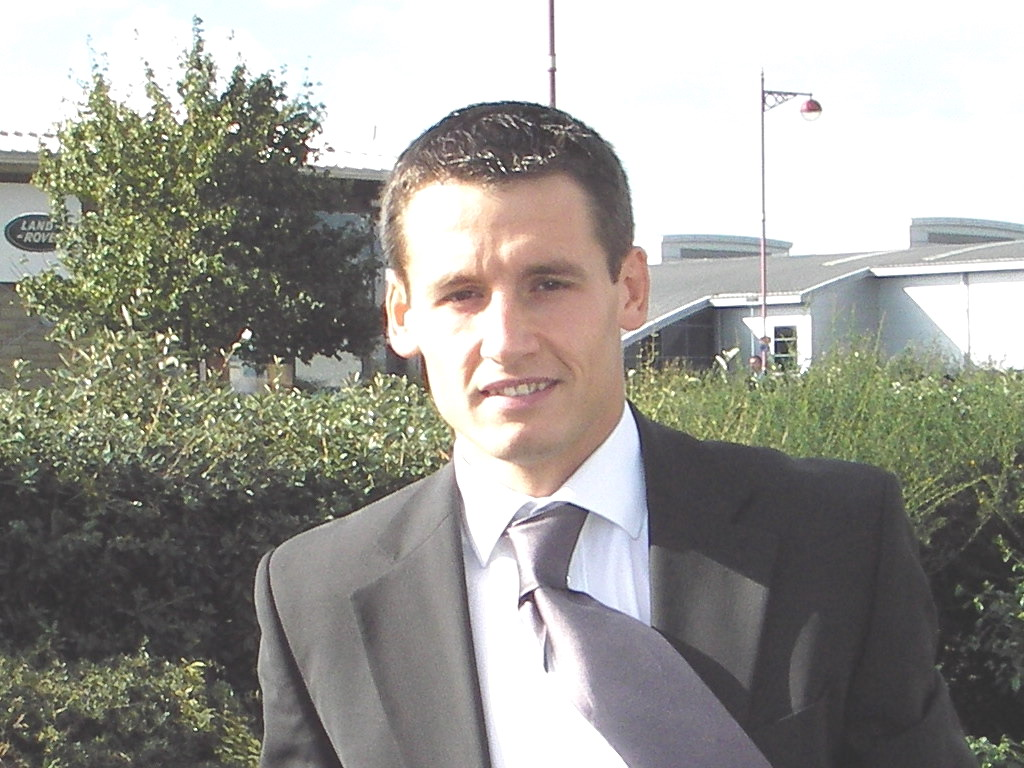

Personal information
- Full name: Paul Boertien
- Date of birth: 20 January 1979 (age 47)
- Place of birth: Haltwhistle, England
- Height: 1.78 m (5 ft 10 in)
- Position: Defender

Senior career*
Years	Team	Apps	(Gls)
1996–1999	Carlisle United	17	(1)
1999–2007	Derby County	114	(2)
2000	→ Crewe Alexandra (loan)	2	(0)
2004	→ Notts County (loan)	5	(0)
2007	→ Chesterfield (loan)	4	(0)
2007–2009	Walsall	51	(0)
2009–2011	Burton Albion	50	(1)
Total		243	(4)
- * Club domestic league appearances and goals

Paul Boertien (born 20 January 1979 in Haltwhistle, Northumberland, England) is an English former footballer who has played for seven English clubs.

== Playing career ==
=== Carlisle United ===
Boertien began his career at Carlisle United in August 1996. His first league game for Carlisle United was against Walsall on 4 October 1997, while his first goal for the club from Cumbria came against Swansea City on 13 February 1999.

=== Derby County ===
Boertien signed for Derby County in March 1999 for a fee of £250,000. He made his debut on 16 May 1999 against Chelsea. He then went out on loan to Crewe Alexandra in 2000 before returning to score his first goal in a 2–0 Premier League win over Derby's local rivals Leicester City on 16 April 2001. Boertien was in and out of the team over the next three years, including a loan spell at Notts County in 2004, but suffered from an unlucky run of injuries between 2004 and 2006 which saw him a virtual ever-present in the treatment room. He made his return to the first team after almost two years in a 2–1 victory over Hull City in August 2006. However, an injury sustained during the Boxing Day defeat to Wolverhampton Wanderers, coupled with the signing of Blackburn Rovers Jay McEveley, saw Boertien slip to third choice left back and manager Billy Davies announced his contract would not be renewed at the end of the season, after over eight years at Pride Park.

On 22 March 2007, Boertien joined Derbyshire club Chesterfield on a month's loan in an attempt to regain match fitness and put himself in the shop window. He then returned to Derby, but was released shortly afterwards.

In July 2007, Boertien was given a trial by Oldham Athletic, appearing in a friendly against Barrow but was not offered a contract.

=== Walsall ===
After his failed trial with Oldham Athletic, Boertien joined League One Walsall on 27 July 2007. On 6 May 2009, Boertien was released from Walsall after being told that his contract would not be renewed.

=== Burton Albion ===
On 8 June 2009, it was announced he had signed a one-year deal with Football League newcomers Burton Albion. In doing so he became Paul Peschisolido's first signing as Burton Albion manager. He made 34 League appearances in his first season, scoring one goal against Bradford City on his 200th career league appearance, his first goal in six years, and was later rewarded with a one-year contract extension on 10 May 2010.

Boertien was released from the club in May 2011, which would have ended a two-year spell with the Brewers. However, on 12 May 2011, Boertien signed a new 1 year "pay-as-you-play" contract at the Pirelli Stadium outfit.

Boertien announced his retirement on 15 December 2011 after making a career total of 268 appearances.

== Career statistics ==
Football League only. Source:

Club	Season	Division	League		FA Cup		League Cup		Other		Total	
Club	Season	Division	Apps	Goals	Apps	Goals	Apps	Goals	Apps	Goals	Apps	Goals
Carlisle United	1997–98	Division Two	9	0	1	0	2	0	1 (Note: Appearance(s) in Football League Trophy)	0	13	0
Carlisle United	1998–99	Division Three	8	1	0	0	0	0	0	0	8	1
Total			17	1	1	0	2	0	1	0	21	1
Derby County	1998–99	Premier League	1	0	0	0	0	0	0	0	1	0
Derby County	1999–2000	Premier League	2	0	0	0	1	0	0	0	3	0
Derby County	2000–01	Premier League	8	1	3	0	0	0	0	0	11	1
Derby County	2001–02	Premier League	32	0	1	0	1	0	0	0	34	0
Derby County	2002–03	Division One	42	1	1	0	2	0	0	0	45	1
Derby County	2003–04	Division One	18	0	0	0	1	0	0	0	19	0
Derby County	2004–05	Championship	0	0	2	0	0	0	0	0	2	0
Derby County	2005–06	Championship	0	0	0	0	0	0	0	0	0	0
Derby County	2006–07	Championship	11	0	0	0	0	0	0	0	11	0
Total			114	2	7	0	5	0	0	0	126	2
→ Crewe Alexandra (loan)	1999–2000	Division One	2	0	0	0	0	0	0	0	2	0
→ Notts County (loan)	2002–03	Division Two	5	0	0	0	0	0	0	0	5	0
→ Chesterfield (loan)	2006–07	League One	4	0	0	0	0	0	0	0	4	0
Walsall	2007–08	League One	20	0	1	0	1	0	1	0	23	0
Walsall	2008–09	League One	31	0	0	0	0	0	2	0	33	0
Walsall total			51	0	1	0	1	0	3	0	56	0
Burton Albion	2009–10	League Two	34	1	0	0	1	0	1	0	36	1
Burton Albion	2010–11	League Two	16	0	0	0	1	0	1	0	18	0
Burton Albion total			50	1	0	0	2	0	2	0	54	1
Career total			243	4	9	0	10	0	6	0	268	4
