= Ryan Austin (footballer) =

English footballer (born 1984)

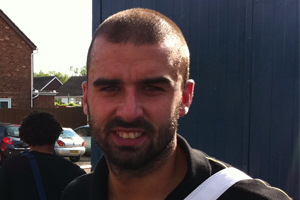
- Austin in 2011

Personal information
- Date of birth: 15 November 1984 (age 41)
- Place of birth: Stoke-on-Trent, England
- Position: Defender

Youth career
- 2004: Crewe Alexandra

Senior career*
Years	Team	Apps	(Gls)
2004–2005	Crewe Alexandra	0	(0)
2004–2005	→ Burton Albion (loan)	30	(0)
2005–2012	Burton Albion	191	(4)
2012–2013	Kidderminster Harriers	5	(0)
2012	→ Brackley Town (loan)	15	(0)
2013–2016	Brackley Town	108	(1)
2016–2020	Kidsgrove Athletic		

International career
2006	England C	2	(0)

Managerial career
- 2016–2020: Kidsgrove Athletic (player-manager)
- 2020–2021: Congleton Town
- * Club domestic league appearances and goals

Ryan Austin (born 15 November 1984) is an English professional football manager and former player.

== Playing career ==
Austin was born in Stoke-on-Trent. After starting out as a trainee at Crewe Alexandra in 2004 he was later promoted to the first-team. He then had a successful loan spell at Burton Albion impressing manager Nigel Clough. In August 2004, he signed for Burton Albion on a free transfer from Crewe. A regular for Burton in the Football Conference, Austin made his Football League debut on 8 August 2009 in a 3–1 away defeat to Shrewsbury Town. Austin has also played for the England C national football team at semi-professional level.

Austin was ruled out until the end of the 2009–10 season with a torn knee ligament. He made his return to the side after injury against Rotherham United on 11 September 2010. Austin was released by Burton Albion at the end of the 2011–12 campaign. In July 2012 he joined Kidderminster Harriers. In October 2012 he joined Brackley Town on loan. In January 2013, Austin joined Brackley on a permanent deal.

== Coaching career ==
In August 2016 Austin joined Kidsgrove Athletic as a player-manager, replacing Peter Ward. Due to bad results, he was fired on 19 March 2020.

On 29 March 2020, Austin was appointed manager of Congleton Town. Due to a change of personal circumstances, Austin left the club on 24 May 2021.
