= Andrew Corbett =

English footballer

Personal information
- Full name: Andrew John Corbett
- Date of birth: 20 February 1982 (age 44)
- Place of birth: Worcester, England
- Height: 6 ft 0 in (1.83 m)
- Position: Defender

Senior career*
Years	Team	Apps	(Gls)
2000–2003	Kidderminster Harriers	7	(0)
2003	Solihull Borough	42	(25)
2003	Nuneaton Borough	12	(5)
2003–2013	Burton Albion	339	(12)
2013	→ Hereford United (loan)	5	(0)
Total		405	(42)
- * Club domestic league appearances and goals

Andrew John Corbett (born 20 February 1982) is an English former footballer. He was part of the Kidderminster Harriers youth system but found first team opportunities limited to seven appearances in the Football League, and moved to Solihull Borough. At Solihull he was a prolific striker and earned a move to Nuneaton Borough. After just a few months at Nuneaton, Burton Albion secured his signature for a small fee. Corbett joined the Brewers as a striker but has found more success at right back and right midfield, and won the club's Player of the Season award in 2005.

Corbett was part of the 2008/2009 Conference National winning squad and signed a new deal with the club in May 2009.

== Career statistics ==
Appearances and goals by club, season and competition
Club	Season	League		FA Cup		League Cup		League Trophy		Other		Total	
Club	Season	Apps	Goals	Apps	Goals	Apps	Goals	Apps	Goals	Apps	Goals	Apps	Goals
Kidderminster Harriers	2000-01	6	0	0	0	0	0	0	0	0	0	6	0
Kidderminster Harriers	2001–02	1	0	0	0	0	0	0	0	0	0	1	0
Solihull Borough	2002–03	42	25	0	0	0	0	0	0	0	0	42	25
Nuneaton Borough	2003-04	12	5	0	0	0	0	0	0	0	0	12	5
Burton Albion	2003–04	24	1	0	0	0	0	0	0	1	0	25	1
Burton Albion	2004–05	36	1	1	0	0	0	0	0	3	0	40	1
Burton Albion	2005–06	40	0	4	0	0	0	0	0	0	0	44	0
Burton Albion	2006–07	45	4	1	0	0	0	0	0	0	0	46	4
Burton Albion	2007–08	36	2	3	0	0	0	0	0	3	0	42	2
Burton Albion	2008–09	44	2	1	0	0	0	0	0	2	0	47	2
Burton Albion	2009–10	34	1	0	0	1	0	1	0	0	0	36	1
Burton Albion	2010–11	40	1	2	0	0	0	1	0	0	0	43	1
Burton Albion	2011-12	32	0	1	0	1	0	1	0	0	0	35	0
Career total		392	42	13	0	1	0	3	0	9	0	419	42

== Honours ==
- Conference National: 2009
