= 2015–16 Crawley Town F.C. season =

Crawley Town
2015–16 season
- Chairman: Dave Pottinger (until 9 March); Ziya Eren (from 9 March)
- Manager: Mark Yates (until 25 April); Dermot Drummy (from 27 April)
- Stadium: Broadfield Stadium
- League Two: 20th
- FA Cup: First round (eliminated by Luton Town)
- League Cup: First round (eliminated by Peterborough United)
- League Trophy: Second round (eliminated by Southend United)
- Highest home attendance: 4,003 (vs. Portsmouth, League Two, 18 October 2015)
- Lowest home attendance: 1,139 (vs. Southend United, Football League Trophy, 6 October 2015)
| Home colours | Away colours | Third colours |

The 2015–16 season was Crawley Town's 120th season in their history and their first season back in League Two since being relegated from League One the previous season. Along with League Two, the club also competed in the FA Cup, League Cup and League Trophy. The season covered the period from 1 July 2015 to 30 June 2016.

Crawley finished 20th of 24 teams in League Two, and were eliminated in the first round they competed in all three cup competitions.

== Background and pre-season ==
The 2014–15 season saw Crawley relegated from League One after three seasons at the level, having finished 22nd. Manager John Gregory left his role at the end of the season, whilst interim manager Dean Saunders, who had managed the club from December 2014 as Gregory was recovering from heart surgery, was appointed as manager of Chesterfield. Crawley instead appointed Mark Yates as manager on a two-year deal. Following the end of the 2014–15 season, Brian Jensen, Dean Leacock, Charles Banya, Emmett O’Connor, Blair Anderson, Bradley Isaacs, Kelly Youga, John Cofie and Ryan Richefond were all released at the end of their contracts. Marvin Elliott was also released after the club withdrew a contract offer made to him, whilst Josh Simpson turned down a new contract, and instead signed for Plymouth Argyle. Midfielder Bobson Bawling agreed a new one-year contract with the club, and fellow midfielder Conor Henderson agreed a six-month contract. Ryan Dickson transferred to Yeovil Town for a nominal fee, whilst Joe Walsh joined Milton Keynes Dons for an undisclosed fee.

On 19 June 2015, Crawley announced the signing of defender Joe McNerney and midfielder Simon Walton on free transfers, from Woking and Stevenage respectively. Four days later, winger Luke Rooney (who had previously had a loan spell with the club) joined on a free transfer from Ebbsfleet United, and forward Shamir Fenelon joined from Brighton & Hove Albion, also on free transfers. Crawley announced a further four new signings across July, all on free transfers; defender Jon Ashton and forward Roarie Deacon both joined from Stevenage, forward Lee Barnard joined from Southend United and goalkeeper Callum Preston joined from Birmingham City. Crawley also brought in goalkeeper Freddie Woodman on loan from Newcastle United and defender Liam Donnelly on loan from Fulham. Belgian defender Bryan Van Den Bogaert signed on a short-term deal on 7 August.

=== Pre-season friendlies ===
During May and June 2015, Crawley Town announced pre-season friendlies against Brighton & Hove Albion, Burgess Hill Town, Maidstone United, Reading, Nuneaton Town, Fulham and Whitehawk, though the friendly against Maidstone, which was initially scheduled for 25 July, was later cancelled. Crawley won 4–0 away at Burgess Hill Town in their opening pre-season friendly, before losing successive home friendlies against Fulham and Brighton & Hove Albion 3–1 and 3–0 respectively.

Friendly match details
| Date | Time | Opponent | Venue | Result F–A | Scorers | Attendance | Ref. |
|---|---|---|---|---|---|---|---|
| 15 July 2015 | 19:30 | Burgess Hill Town | Away | 0–4 | Deacon 1', Fenelon 18', McLeod 49', 71' | 863 | |
| 18 July 2015 | 15:00 | Fulham | Home | 1–3 | McLeod 18' | 2,215 | |
| 22 July 2015 | 19:45 | Brighton & Hove Albion | Home | 0–3 | | 2,200 | |
| 27 July 2015 | 19:45 | Reading | Home | 1–0 | Henderson 80' | 1,288 | |
| 29 July 2015 | 19:45 | Nuneaton Town | Away | 0–3 | Walton 45' pen., McNerney 47', Harrold 63' | | |
| 1 August 2015 | 15:00 | Whitehawk | Away | 2–1 | Edwards 6' | | |

== Review ==
=== August to October ===
Crawley started the 2015–16 season with a 1–1 away to Oxford United – Gwion Edwards put Crawley ahead with a second-half header before Oxford equalised shortly after. A 2–0 defeat at Peterborough United eliminated Crawley from the League Cup in the first round. Back in the league, Edwards gave Crawley a first-half lead in their first home match, again with a header, before two second-half AFC Wimbledon goals consigned Crawley to a 2–1 defeat on 15 August, and this was followed three days later with a 0–0 home draw against Portsmouth. Crawley picked up their first win of the season on 22 August, winning 3–0 away to Cambridge United – Roarie Deacon scored a brace to put Crawley 2–0 up, and Edwards gave Crawley a third late on, after Crawley's Liam Donnelly had been sent off for a second yellow card. Striker Izale McLeod, who was the club's top scorer during the 2014–15 season with 21 goals, left the club to sign for Notts County for an undisclosed six-figure fee on 22 August. The club drew 0–0 at home to Wycombe Wanderers in their final match of August, to leave the club 14th in the table after 5 matches played.

== Competitions ==
=== League Two ===
==== League table ====
| Pos | Team | Pld | W | D | L | GF | GA | GD | Pts |
|---|---|---|---|---|---|---|---|---|---|
| 18 | Stevenage | 46 | 11 | 15 | 20 | 52 | 67 | −15 | 48 |
| 19 | Yeovil Town | 46 | 11 | 15 | 20 | 43 | 59 | −16 | 48 |
| 20 | Crawley Town | 46 | 13 | 8 | 25 | 45 | 78 | −33 | 47 |
| 21 | Morecambe | 46 | 12 | 10 | 24 | 69 | 91 | −22 | 46 |
| 22 | Newport County | 46 | 10 | 13 | 23 | 43 | 64 | −21 | 43 |

Updated to match(es) played on 7 May 2016. Source: BBC Sport
Rules for classification: 1) Points; 2) Goal difference; 3) Number of goals scored

==== Matches ====
On 17 June 2015, the fixtures for the forthcoming season were announced.

League Two match details
| Date | Time | Opponent | Venue | Result F–A | Scorers | Attendance | Referee | Ref. |
|---|---|---|---|---|---|---|---|---|
| 8 August 2015 | 15:00 | Oxford United | Away | 1–1 | Edwards 56' | 6,349 | Simpson | |
| 15 August 2015 | 15:00 | AFC Wimbledon | Home | 1–2 | Edwards 34' | 2,988 | Whitestone | |
| 18 August 2015 | 19:45 | Portsmouth | Home | 0–0 | | 4,003 | Graham | |
| 22 August 2015 | 15:00 | Cambridge United | Away | 3–0 | Deacon 39', 47', Edwards 87' | 5,459 | Miller | |
| 29 August 2015 | 15:00 | Wycombe Wanderers | Home | 0–0 | | 2,466 | Swabey | |
| 12 September 2015 | 15:00 | Mansfield Town | Away | 0–4 | | 2,524 | Madley | |
| 19 September 2015 | 15:00 | Yeovil Town | Home | 0–1 | | 2,112 | Toner | |
| 22 September 2015 | 19:45 | Notts County | Away | 1–4 | Murphy 24' | 3,267 | Sutton | |
| 26 September 2015 | 15:00 | Accrington Stanley | Home | 0–3 | | 1,659 | Davies | |
| 29 September 2015 | 19:45 | Newport County | Away | 3–0 | Edwards 36', 42', Harrold 61' | 2,137 | Langford | |
| 3 October 2015 | 15:00 | Plymouth Argyle | Away | 1–2 | Deacon 85' | 7,173 | Attwell | |
| 10 October 2015 | 15:00 | Leyton Orient | Home | 3–2 | Deacon 27', Hancox 36', Walton 45' pen. | 2,575 | Wright | |
| 17 October 2015 | 15:00 | Luton Town | Home | 2–1 | Murphy 67', Harrold 81' | 3,335 | Ward | |
| 20 October 2015 | 19:45 | Morecambe | Away | 1–3 | Murphy 81' | 1,098 | Handley | |
| 24 October 2015 | 15:00 | Hartlepool United | Away | 2–1 | Walton 66' pen., Murphy 76' | 3,262 | Heywood | |
| 31 October 2015 | 15:00 | York City | Home | 1–0 | Walton 86' pen. | 1,950 | Breakspear | |
| 14 November 2015 | 15:00 | Exeter City | Away | 2–2 | Bradley 28', Rooney 90+2' | 3,664 | Adcock | |
| 21 November 2015 | 15:00 | Bristol Rovers | Home | 2–1 | Murphy 9', 10' | 2,612 | Kettle | |
| 24 November 2015 | 19:45 | Northampton Town | Home | 1–2 | Walton 61' pen. | 2,325 | Martin | |
| 28 November 2015 | 15:00 | Carlisle United | Away | 1–3 | Murphy 34' | 4,641 | Salisbury | |
| 12 December 2015 | 15:00 | Dagenham & Redbridge | Home | 3–2 | Harrold 40', Murphy 45', 82' | 1,543 | Malone | |
| 19 December 2015 | 15:00 | Barnet | Away | 2–4 | Hancox 76', Smith 79' | 1,888 | Williamson | |
| 26 December 2015 | 15:00 | Stevenage | Home | 2–1 | Edwards 68', Deacon 90' | 2,289 | Bull | |
| 28 December 2015 | 15:00 | Wycombe Wanderers | Away | 0–2 | | 4,153 | Drysdale | |
| 2 January 2016 | 15:00 | Portsmouth | Away | 0–3 | | 16,606 | Whitestone | |
| 9 January 2016 | 15:00 | Cambridge United | Home | 1–0 | Harrold 36' | 2,320 | Swabey | |
| 16 January 2016 | 15:00 | Notts County | Home | 0–1 | | 2,320 | Stroud | |
| 23 January 2016 | 15:00 | Yeovil Town | Away | 1–2 | Barnard 83' | 3,423 | Attwell | |
| 30 January 2016 | 15:00 | Mansfield Town | Home | 0–1 | | 1,981 | Horwood | |
| 6 February 2016 | 15:00 | Stevenage | Away | 1–0 | Harrold 44' | 2,639 | Ward | |
| 13 February 2016 | 15:00 | Accrington Stanley | Away | 1–4 | Edwards 21' | 1,374 | Haines | |
| 20 February 2016 | 15:00 | Plymouth Argyle | Home | 1–1 | Fenelon 83' | 3,522 | Bankes | |
| 27 February 2016 | 15:00 | Leyton Orient | Away | 0–2 | | 4,610 | Collins | |
| 1 March 2016 | 19:45 | Newport County | Home | 2–0 | Boden 36' o.g.,Fenelon 53' | 2,003 | Robinson | |
| 5 March 2016 | 15:00 | Morecambe | Home | 1–1 | Harrold 54' | 1,697 | Williamson | |
| 12 March 2016 | 15:00 | Luton Town | Away | 1–0 | Harrold 12' | 8,264 | Bull | |
| 19 March 2016 | 15:00 | Hartlepool United | Home | 0–0 | | 1,883 | Coote | |
| 25 March 2016 | 15:00 | York City | Away | 2–2 | Harrold 5', McAlinden 48' | 2,942 | Gibbes | |
| 28 March 2016 | 15:00 | Exeter City | Home | 0–2 | | 2,416 | Haines | |
| 2 April 2016 | 15:00 | Bristol Rovers | Away | 0–3 | | 8,250 | Graham | |
| 9 April 2016 | 15:00 | Oxford United | Home | 1–5 | McNerney 28' | 3,340 | Kinseley | |
| 16 April 2016 | 15:00 | AFC Wimbledon | Away | 0–1 | | 4,356 | Robinson | |
| 19 April 2016 | 19:45 | Northampton Town | Away | 1–2 | Edwards 85' | 5,327 | Swabey | |
| 23 April 2016 | 15:00 | Carlisle United | Home | 0–1 | | 1,940 | Ward | |
| 30 April 2016 | 15:00 | Dagenham & Redbridge | Away | 0–3 | | 1,643 | Brown | |
| 7 May 2016 | 15:00 | Barnet | Home | 0–3 | | 2,293 | Coote | |

=== FA Cup ===
FA Cup match details
| Round | Date | Time | Opponent | Venue | Result F–A | Scorers | Attendance | Referee | Ref. |
|---|---|---|---|---|---|---|---|---|---|
| First round | 7 November 2015 | 15:00 | Luton Town | Home | 1–2 | Harrold 63' | 1,929 | Kinseley | |

=== League Cup ===
On 16 June 2015, the first round draw was made, Crawley Town were drawn away against Peterborough United.

Football League Cup match details
| Round | Date | Time | Opponent | Venue | Result F–A | Scorers | Attendance | Referee | Ref. |
|---|---|---|---|---|---|---|---|---|---|
| First round | 11 August 2015 | 19:45 | Peterborough United | Away | 0–2 | | 2,500 | Lewis | |

=== Football League Trophy ===
On 5 September 2015, the second round draw was shown live on Soccer AM and drawn by Charlie Austin and Ed Skrein. Crawley were drawn at home to Southend United.

Football League Trophy match details
| Round | Date | Time | Opponent | Venue | Result F–A | Scorers | Attendance | Referee | Ref. |
|---|---|---|---|---|---|---|---|---|---|
| Second round | 6 October 2015 | 19:45 | Southend United | Home | 0–3 | | 1,139 | Robinson | |

== Transfers ==
=== Transfers in ===
| Date | Position | Name | From | Fee | Ref. |
|---|---|---|---|---|---|
| 1 July 2015 | DF | Joe McNerney | Woking | Free transfer | |
| 1 July 2015 | MF | Simon Walton | Stevenage | Free transfer | |
| 1 July 2015 | MF | Luke Rooney | Ebbsfleet United | Free transfer | |
| 1 July 2015 | FW | Shamir Fenelon | Brighton & Hove Albion | Free transfer | |
| 8 July 2015 | DF | Jon Ashton | Stevenage | Free transfer | |
| 27 July 2015 | FW | Lee Barnard | Southend United | Free transfer | |
| 27 July 2015 | MF | Roarie Deacon | Stevenage | Free transfer | |
| 29 July 2015 | GK | Callum Preston | Birmingham City | Free transfer | |
| 7 August 2015 | DF | Bryan van den Bogaert | Royal Antwerp | Free transfer | |
| 17 September 2015 | MF | Ross Jenkins | Watford | Free transfer | |
| 16 October 2015 | GK | Darryl Flahavan | Unattached | Free transfer | |
| 19 February 2016 | MF | Andy Bond | Unattached | Free transfer | |
| 26 February 2016 | MF | Lyle Della-Verde | Fleetwood Town | Free transfer | |

=== Transfers out ===
| Date | Position | Name | To | Fee | Ref. |
|---|---|---|---|---|---|
| 30 June 2015 | GK | Brian Jensen | (Mansfield Town) | Released | |
| 30 June 2015 | DF | Dean Leacock | (Whitehawk) | Released | |
| 30 June 2015 | MF | Charles Banya | (Maidstone United) | Released | |
| 30 June 2015 | MF | Emmett O'Connor | | Released | |
| 30 June 2015 | MF | Blair Anderson | (Basford United) | Released | |
| 30 June 2015 | MF | Bradley Issacs | | Released | |
| 30 June 2015 | MF | Kelly Youga | | Released | |
| 30 June 2015 | FW | John Cofie | (Wrexham) | Released | |
| 30 June 2015 | MF | Ryan Richefond | (Loxwood) | Released | |
| 30 June 2015 | MF | Marvin Elliott | | Released | |
| 30 June 2015 | MF | Josh Simpson | (Plymouth Argyle) | Free transfer | |
| 1 July 2015 | DF | Ryan Dickson | Yeovil Town | Nominal | |
| 1 July 2015 | DF | Joe Walsh | Milton Keynes Dons | Undisclosed | |
| 22 August 2015 | FW | Izale McLeod | Notts County | Undisclosed | |
| 29 August 2015 | DF | Bryan van den Bogaert | (Whitehawk) | Released | |
| 4 January 2016 | MF | Conor Henderson | Grimsby Town | Released | |
| 19 February 2016 | MF | Ross Jenkins | (Poli Timișoara) | Released | |
| 8 March 2016 | MF | Luke Rooney | Arizona United | Released | |

=== Loans in ===
| Date from | Position | Name | From | Date until | Ref. |
|---|---|---|---|---|---|
| 29 July 2015 | GK | Freddie Woodman | Newcastle United | 12 October 2015 | |
| 31 July 2015 | DF | Liam Donnelly | Fulham | 27 August 2015 | (Note: Donnelly's loan was extended on 28 August 2015, until 2 January 2016.) |
| 20 August 2015 | DF | Christian Scales | Crystal Palace | 2 January 2016 | |
| 17 September 2015 | FW | Rhys Murphy | Oldham Athletic | 19 December 2015 | |
| 29 September 2015 | DF | Josh Yorwerth | Ipswich Town | End of season | |
| 2 October 2015 | DF | Mitch Hancox | Birmingham City | 2 January 2016 | |
| 26 November 2015 | DF | Josh Emmanuel | Ipswich Town | 2 January 2016 | |
| 9 January 2016 | DF | George Smith | Barnsley | 6 February 2016 | |
| 14 January 2016 | MF | Chris Atkinson | Crewe Alexandra | 7 March 2016 | |
| 1 February 2016 | GK | Paul Jones | Portsmouth | 23 March 2016 | |
| 19 February 2016 | DF | Tom Dallison | Brighton & Hove Albion | 21 March 2016 | |
| 26 February 2016 | MF | Frankie Sutherland | Queens Park Rangers | 7 May 2016 | |
| 1 March 2016 | DF | Charles Banya | Blackpool | End of season | |
| 10 March 2016 | FW | Liam McAlinden | Wolverhampton Wanderers | End of season | |
| 23 March 2016 | GK | Jack Rose | West Bromwich Albion | End of season | |

=== Loans out ===
| Date from | Position | Name | To | Date until | Ref. |
|---|---|---|---|---|---|
| 29 August 2015 | FW | Shamir Fenelon | Whitehawk | 26 September 2015 | |
| 27 November 2015 | MF | Conor Henderson | Grimsby Town | 30 December 2015 | |

== Appearances and goals ==
Numbers in parentheses denote appearances as substitute.
Players with names struck through and marked † left the club during the playing season.
Players with names in italics and marked * were on loan from another club for the whole of their season with Crawley.
Key to positions: GK – Goalkeeper; DF – Defender; MF – Midfielder; FW – Forward

Players' appearances and goals by competition
| No. | Pos. | Nat. | Name | League Two | | FA Cup | | League Cup | | FL Trophy | | Total | |
| No. | Pos. | Nat. | Name | Apps | Goals | Apps | Goals | Apps | Goals | Apps | Goals | Apps | Goals |
|---|---|---|---|---|---|---|---|---|---|---|---|---|---|
| 1 | GK | ENG | ~~Freddie Woodman~~ *† | 11 | 0 | 0 | 0 | 1 | 0 | 0 | 0 | 12 | 0 |
| 1 | GK | ENG | ~~Darryl Flahavan~~ † | 13 | 0 | 1 | 0 | 0 | 0 | 0 | 0 | 14 | 0 |
| 1 | GK | ENG | ~~Paul Jones~~ *† | 8 | 0 | 0 | 0 | 0 | 0 | 0 | 0 | 8 | 0 |
| 1 | GK | ENG | Jack Rose * | 5 | 0 | 0 | 0 | 0 | 0 | 0 | 0 | 5 | 0 |
| 2 | DF | IRL | Lanre Oyebanjo | 7 | 0 | 0 | 0 | 0 | 0 | 0 | 0 | 7 | 0 |
| 3 | DF | ENG | ~~Christian Scales~~ *† | 7 (1) | 0 | 1 | 0 | 0 | 0 | 0 | 0 | 8 (1) | 0 |
| 3 | DF | ENG | Tom Dallison * | 1 | 0 | 0 | 0 | 0 | 0 | 0 | 0 | 1 | 0 |
| 4 | MF | ENG | Simon Walton | 31 (6) | 4 | 1 | 0 | 0 | 0 | 1 | 0 | 33 (6) | 4 |
| 5 | DF | ENG | Joe McNerney | 10 (1) | 1 | 0 | 0 | 1 | 0 | 1 | 0 | 12 (1) | 1 |
| 6 | DF | ENG | Sonny Bradley | 46 | 1 | 1 | 0 | 1 | 0 | 1 | 0 | 49 | 1 |
| 7 | MF | WAL | Gwion Edwards | 40 (2) | 8 | 1 | 0 | 0 (1) | 0 | 1 | 0 | 42 (3) | 8 |
| 8 | MF | ENG | Jimmy Smith | 29 (2) | 1 | 1 | 0 | 1 | 0 | 1 | 0 | 32 (2) | 1 |
| 9 | FW | ENG | Lee Barnard | 14 (14) | 1 | 0 (1) | 0 | 0 (1) | 0 | 1 | 0 | 15 (16) | 1 |
| 10 | MF | ENG | ~~Luke Rooney~~ † | 9 (10) | 1 | 0 (1) | 0 | 1 | 0 | 1 | 0 | 11 (11) | 1 |
| 11 | MF | IRL | ~~Conor Henderson~~ † | 2 (1) | 0 | 0 | 0 | 0 | 0 | 0 | 0 | 2 (1) | 0 |
| 11 | MF | ENG | ~~Chris Atkinson~~ *† | 5 (2) | 0 | 0 | 0 | 0 | 0 | 0 | 0 | 5 (2) | 0 |
| 11 | FW | IRL | Liam McAlinden * | 5 (1) | 1 | 0 | 0 | 0 | 0 | 0 | 0 | 5 (1) | 1 |
| 12 | GK | WAL | Callum Preston | 9 | 0 | 0 | 0 | 0 | 0 | 1 | 0 | 10 | 0 |
| 14 | MF | ENG | Lewis Young | 29 (9) | 0 | 1 | 0 | 1 | 0 | 0 (1) | 0 | 31 (10) | 0 |
| 15 | FW | ENG | Shamir Fenelon | 9 (21) | 2 | 0 (1) | 0 | 1 | 0 | 0 (1) | 0 | 10 (23) | 2 |
| 16 | DF | ENG | Jon Ashton | 26 (4) | 0 | 0 | 0 | 0 | 0 | 0 | 0 | 26 (4) | 0 |
| 17 | MF | ENG | Bobson Bawling | 7 (8) | 0 | 0 | 0 | 0 (1) | 0 | 0 | 0 | 7 (9) | 0 |
| 18 | FW | ENG | Matt Harrold | 33 (4) | 8 | 1 | 1 | 1 | 0 | 0 | 0 | 35 (4) | 9 |
| 20 | FW | ENG | Roarie Deacon | 21 (16) | 5 | 1 | 0 | 1 | 0 | 1 | 0 | 24 (16) | 5 |
| 21 | FW | ENG | Gavin Tomlin | 11 (5) | 0 | 0 | 0 | 0 | 0 | 0 (1) | 0 | 11 (6) | 0 |
| 22 | MF | ENG | ~~Ross Jenkins~~ † | 7 (7) | 0 | 0 | 0 | 0 | 0 | 0 | 0 | 7 (7) | 0 |
| 22 | MF | ENG | Andy Bond | 11 (1) | 0 | 0 | 0 | 0 | 0 | 0 | 0 | 11 (1) | 0 |
| 23 | DF | NIR | ~~Liam Donnelly~~ *† | 9 (1) | 0 | 0 | 0 | 1 | 0 | 1 | 0 | 11 (1) | 0 |
| 23 | DF | ENG | ~~Josh Emmanuel~~ *† | 1 (1) | 0 | 0 | 0 | 0 | 0 | 0 | 0 | 1 (1) | 0 |
| 24 | DF | BEL | ~~Bryan Van Den Bogaert~~ † | 1 | 0 | 0 | 0 | 1 | 0 | 0 | 0 | 2 | 0 |
| 24 | DF | ENG | ~~Mitch Hancox~~ *† | 15 | 2 | 0 | 0 | 0 | 0 | 1 | 0 | 16 | 2 |
| 24 | MF | IRL | Frankie Sutherland * | 10 (1) | 0 | 0 | 0 | 0 | 0 | 0 | 0 | 10 (1) | 0 |
| 25 | DF | WAL | Josh Yorwerth * | 23 (1) | 0 | 1 | 0 | 0 | 0 | 0 | 0 | 24 (1) | 0 |
| 26 | DF | ENG | George Smith * | 4 | 0 | 0 | 0 | 0 | 0 | 0 | 0 | 4 | 0 |
| 30 | MF | ENG | Lyle Della Verde | 10 (2) | 0 | 0 | 0 | 0 | 0 | 0 | 0 | 10 (2) | 0 |
| 31 | DF | ENG | Charles Dunne * | 12 | 0 | 0 | 0 | 0 | 0 | 0 | 0 | 12 | 0 |
| 39 | FW | IRL | ~~Rhys Murphy~~ *† | 15 | 9 | 1 | 0 | 0 | 0 | 0 | 0 | 16 | 9 |

Players not included in matchday squads
| No. | Pos. | Nat. | Name |
|---|---|---|---|
| 22 | FW | ENG | Izale McLeod |
| 41 | GK | ENG | Andy Little |
