= Shamir Fenelon =

Irish footballer (born 1994)

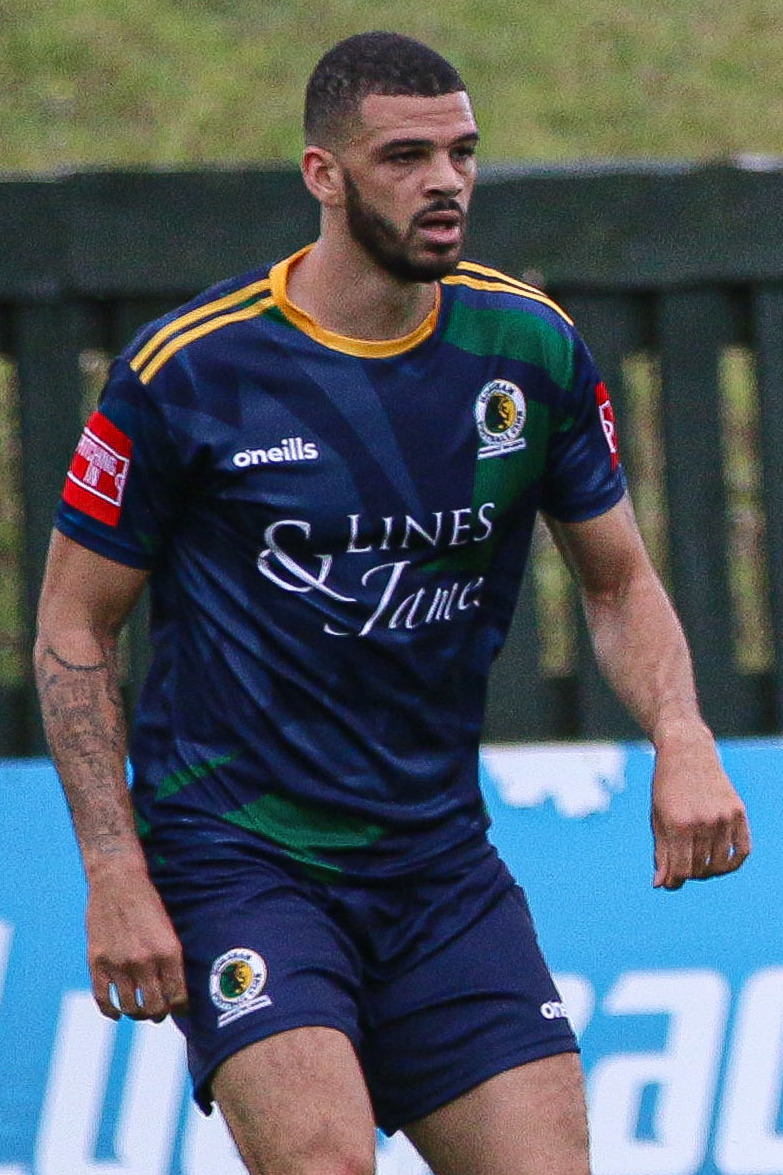
- Fenelon playing for Horsham in August 2021

Personal information
- Full name: Shamir Daniel Sanchez Fenelon
- Date of birth: 3 August 1994 (age 32)
- Place of birth: London, England
- Height: 1.86 m (6 ft 1 in)
- Positions: Winger; forward

Team information
- Current team: Horsham

Youth career
- 2010–2012: Brighton & Hove Albion

Senior career*
Years	Team	Apps	(Gls)
2012–2015	Brighton & Hove Albion	2	(0)
2013	→ Tonbridge Angels (loan)	8	(4)
2014	→ Torquay United (loan)	12	(1)
2014	→ Rochdale (loan)	4	(0)
2014–2015	→ Tranmere Rovers (loan)	10	(2)
2015	→ Dagenham & Redbridge (loan)	4	(0)
2015–2016	Crawley Town	30	(2)
2015	→ Whitehawk (loan)	5	(2)
2016–2019	Aldershot Town	90	(19)
2019–2020	Maidenhead United	19	(3)
2020–2021	Billericay Town	11	(1)
2021–	Horsham	171	(31)

International career^{‡}
2015	Republic of Ireland U21	3	(0)
- * Club domestic league appearances and goals as of 09:19, 26 April 2026 (UTC) ‡ National team caps and goals as of 20:49, 13 January 2016 (UTC)

Shamir Daniel Sanchez Fenelon (born 3 August 1994) is an Irish footballer who plays as a winger or striker for Horsham.

== Career ==
=== Brighton and Hove Albion ===
Fenelon began his career with Brighton & Hove Albion and after scoring 20 goals for the club's youth team in the 2011–12 season he signed a professional contract in May 2012.

In May 2013, Fenelon was then given a one-year contract with the club. While on loan at Torquay United, Fenelon signed a further contract extension with the Albion until 2015.

Fenelon made his Brighton & Hove Albion debut in the opening game of the 2014–2015 season, in a 1–0 home defeat against Sheffield Wednesday. Fenelon made only two further appearances for the club: one in the league as a substitute in an away defeat at Birmingham City and another in the first round of the League Cup. At the end of the 2014–15 season, Fenelon was released.

=== Loan Spells ===
He had a successful loan spell with Conference South side Tonbridge Angels in November 2013.

On 11 January 2014, Fenelon joined Football League Two side Torquay United on loan. He made his Football League debut on 25 January 2014 in a 1–0 defeat against Oxford United. After making two appearances, Fenelon loan spell with Brighton was extended for another one month. He scored his first goal on 15 February 2014 in a 3–1 defeat away at Chesterfield. On 11 March 2014, Fenelon extended his loan spell with the Gulls further until the end of the 2013–14 season. On 22 March 2014, Fenelon was sent-off after making contact with his elbow on the opposition's captain Michael Flynn, in a 1–0 loss against Newport County. After the match, the club appealed for Fenelon's sending off, as the club's assistant manager Lee Hodges believed that the referee's decision was wrong citing, "both players have got arms in the air flailing." However, the appeal was rejected and would have to serve his three match ban. After his return from suspension, Fenelon was unable to help the club survive relegation, as Torquay United drop down to the Football Conference, making twelve appearances and scoring once. Despite unable to help the club survive the relegation, Fenelon stated that the loan spell at Torquay United helped him progress and his maturity.

On 29 August 2014, Fenelon joined Football League One side Rochdale on a season long loan. The next day, Fenelon made his debut for the club, where he came on as a substitute for Matt Done in the second half, in a 2–0 win over Bradford City. After making four appearances for the club, it announced on 9 October 2014 that Fenelon loan spell with Rochdale ended after being recalled by his parent club.

After returning to Brighton & Hove Albion, Fenelon went out on loan again by joining Football League Two side Tranmere Rovers until January 2015. He made his Tranmere Rovers debut, the next day, as they lost 2–1 to Southend United. The next game, on 29 November 2014, Fenelon scored his first goal for the club, in a 3–1 win over Portsmouth. Fenelon returned from Tranmere on 2 February 2015.

On 27 February 2015, he was sent on loan to Football League Two side Dagenham & Redbridge in a one-month deal. He made his debut for the club the next day in a 2–1 league defeat to Mansfield Town, replacing Alex Jakubiak as a substitute. After making four appearances, Fenelon returned to his parent club.

=== Crawley Town ===
Fenelon signed for League Two side Crawley Town on 23 June 2015 on a free transfer on a one-year deal. Upon joining the club, Fenelon revealed he had offers from League Two clubs, as well from clubs of his home country before joining Crawley Town.

Fenelon joined National League South Whitehawk on a month's loan and made his debut for The Hawks as a substitute in the 2–2 draw at Ebbsfleet United on 29 August 2015.

=== Non-league ===
On 30 June 2016, Fenelon joined National League side Aldershot Town. Over three seasons, Fenelon played 102 games for the Shots, scoring 20 goals.

On 7 May 2019, Fenelon signed for National League side Maidenhead United. He left the club at the end of the season after five goals in 21 games.

Fenelon joined Billericay Town on 14 August 2020. He played twelve times, scoring one goal.

He joined Horsham in July 2021. On 8 May 2024, Fenelon scored the second goal in a 3–0 win over Hastings as Horsham won the Sussex Senior Cup. He was part of the match day squad as Horsham won it again the following season, this time beating Littlehampton 1-0 Fenelon was also part of the Horsham squad that won the Isthmian League title in 2024–25 and gained promotion to the National League South for the first time in the clubs history.

== International career ==
In March 2015, Fenelon received his first call-up to the Republic of Ireland under-21 side for the 2017 UEFA European Under-21 Championship qualification match against Andorra. He made his debut in that match, replacing Conor Wilkinson in a 1–0 win.

== Personal life ==
In July 2014, Fenelon changed his surname from Goodwin to Fenelon.

== Career statistics ==
As of matches played 26 April 2026

Appearances and goals by club, season and competition
Club	Season	League			FA Cup		League Cup		Other		Total	
Club	Season	Division	Apps	Goals	Apps	Goals	Apps	Goals	Apps	Goals	Apps	Goals
Brighton & Hove Albion	2012–13	Championship	0	0	0	0	0	0	0	0	0	0
Brighton & Hove Albion	2013–14	Championship	0	0	0	0	0	0	0	0	0	0
Brighton & Hove Albion	2014–15	Championship	2	0	—		1	0	—		3	0
Brighton & Hove Albion	Total		2	0	0	0	1	0	0	0	3	0
Tonbridge Angels (loan)	2013–14	Conference South	8	4	—		—		4 (Note: Appearances in FA Trophy)	1	12	5
Torquay United (loan)	2013–14	League Two	12	1	—		—		—		12	1
Rochdale (loan)	2014–15	League One	4	0	—		—		1 (Note: Appearances in Football League Trophy)	0	5	0
Tranmere Rovers (loan)	2014–15	League Two	10	2	3	0	—		—		13	2
Dagenham & Redbridge (loan)	2014–15	League Two	4	0	—		—		—		4	0
Crawley Town	2015–16	League Two	30	2	1	0	1	0	1	0	33	2
Whitehawk (loan)	2015–16	National League South	5	2	—		—		—		5	2
Aldershot Town	2016–17	National League	38	7	1	0	—		4 (Note: Two appearances in FA Trophy, two in National League play-offs)	0	43	7
Aldershot Town	2017–18	National League	34	11	2	0	—		2 (Note: One appearance in FA Trophy, one in National League play-offs)	0	38	11
Aldershot Town	2018–19	National League	18	1	2	0	—		1	1	21	2
Aldershot Town	Total		90	19	5	0	—		7	1	102	20
Maidenhead United	2019–20	National League	19	3	0	0	—		2	2	21	5
Billericay Town	2020–21	National League South	11	1	1	0	—		0	0	12	1
Horsham	2021–22	Isthmian League Premier Division	32	13	4	2	—		8 (Note: One appearance in FA Trophy, two appearances and one goal in Sussex Senior Cup, five appearances and two goals in Alan Turvey Trophy)	3	44	18
Horsham	2022–23	Isthmian League Premier Division	36	4	1	0	—		5 (Note: Two appearances and one goal in FA Trophy, two appearances and one goal in Sussex Senior Cup, one appearance in Alan Turvey Trophy)	2	42	6
Horsham	2023–24	Isthmian League Premier Division	36	7	7	2	—		4 (Note: One appearance in the FA Trophy, three appearances three goals in the Sussex Senior Cup)	3	47	12
Horsham	2024–25	Isthmian League Premier Division	30	4	6	0	—		6 (Note: Two appearances in the FA Trophy and four appearances in the Sussex Senior Cup)	0	42	4
Horsham	2025–26	National League South	37	3	3	3	—		7 (Note: Five appearances in the FA Trophy, two appearances and two goals in the Sussex Senior Cup)	2	47	8
Horsham	Total		171	31	21	7	—		30	10	222	48
Career total			366	65	31	7	2	0	45	14	444	86

== Honours ==
=== Horsham ===
- Sussex Senior Cup: 2023–24, 2024–25
- Isthmian League Premier Division: 2024–25
- Isthmian League Community Shield: 2025
