= Lyndon School, Solihull =

High school in Solihull, England

Lyndon School

Location
- Daylesford Road; Solihull, West Midlands, B92 8EJ; England
- Coordinates: 52°26′51″N 1°47′27″W

Information
- Type: Academy
- Established: 1952
- Local authority: Solihull
- Department for Education URN: 142075 Tables
- Ofsted: Reports
- Head Teacher: Syreeta Kapswara
- Gender: Co-educational
- Age: 11 to 16
- Enrolment: 1119
- Houses: Warwick, Coventry, Birmingham
- Colours: Blue, Black & Green
- Website: www.lyndon.org.uk

Lyndon School is a co-educational secondary school in Solihull, West Midlands, England. It is situated near to the Birmingham boundary and draws pupils from both Solihull and Birmingham. The school regularly houses half term sports clubs. It also held a specialist Humanities College status between 2006 and 2010 when the Specialist Schools Programme ended. The school converted to academy status in September 2015.

== Notable alumni ==
- Al Hunter Ashton, English actor and script-writer
- Matthew Croucher, member of the Royal Marines Reserve and a recipient of the George Cross
- Mitch Hancox, English professional footballer
- Shaun Timmins, English footballer

== Notable staff ==
- Barbara Hambly (field hockey)
