= Blair Anderson =

English footballer

Personal information
- Full name: Blair Thomas Anderson
- Date of birth: 1 July 1992 (age 34)
- Place of birth: Reading, England
- Position: Midfielder

Team information
- Current team: Coalville Town

Senior career*
Years	Team	Apps	(Gls)
2012–2013	Rainworth Miners Welfare	0	(0)
2014	Long Eaton United	6	(0)
2014–2015	Basford United	13	(3)
2015	Crawley Town	1	(0)
2015–2016	Basford United		
2016	Barwell	4	(1)
2016–2017	Long Eaton United	25	(4)
2017	Coalville Town	0	(0)
- * Club domestic league appearances and goals as of 00:00, 23 July 2018 (UTC)

Blair Anderson (born 1 July 1992) is an English footballer who plays as a midfielder for Coalville Town.

== Playing career ==
Born in Reading, Anderson was signed by League One side Crawley Town from Basford United of the Midland League in January 2015 after impressing interim manager Dean Saunders. He made his debut in the Football League as a 69th-minute substitute for Gwion Edwards in a 2–2 draw with Milton Keynes Dons at Broadfield Stadium on 10 January.

On 1 July 2015, he was released by Crawley and returned to former club Basford United. On 5 July 2017 he signed for Coalville Town.

== Statistics ==
Appearances and goals by club, season and competition
Club	Season	League			FA Cup		League Cup		Other		Total	
Club	Season	Division	Apps	Goals	Apps	Goals	Apps	Goals	Apps	Goals	Apps	Goals
Crawley Town	2014–15	League One	1	0	0	0	0	0	0	0	1	0
Basford United	2015–16	Northern Premier League Division One South	0	0	0	0	0	0	0	0	0	0
Barwell	2015–16	Northern Premier League Premier Division	4	1	1	0	0	0	0	0	5	1
Long Eaton United	2015–16	Midland Football League Premier Division	0	0	0	0	0	0	0	0	0	0
Career total			1	0	0	0	0	0	0	0	1	0
