= Christian Scales =

English footballer

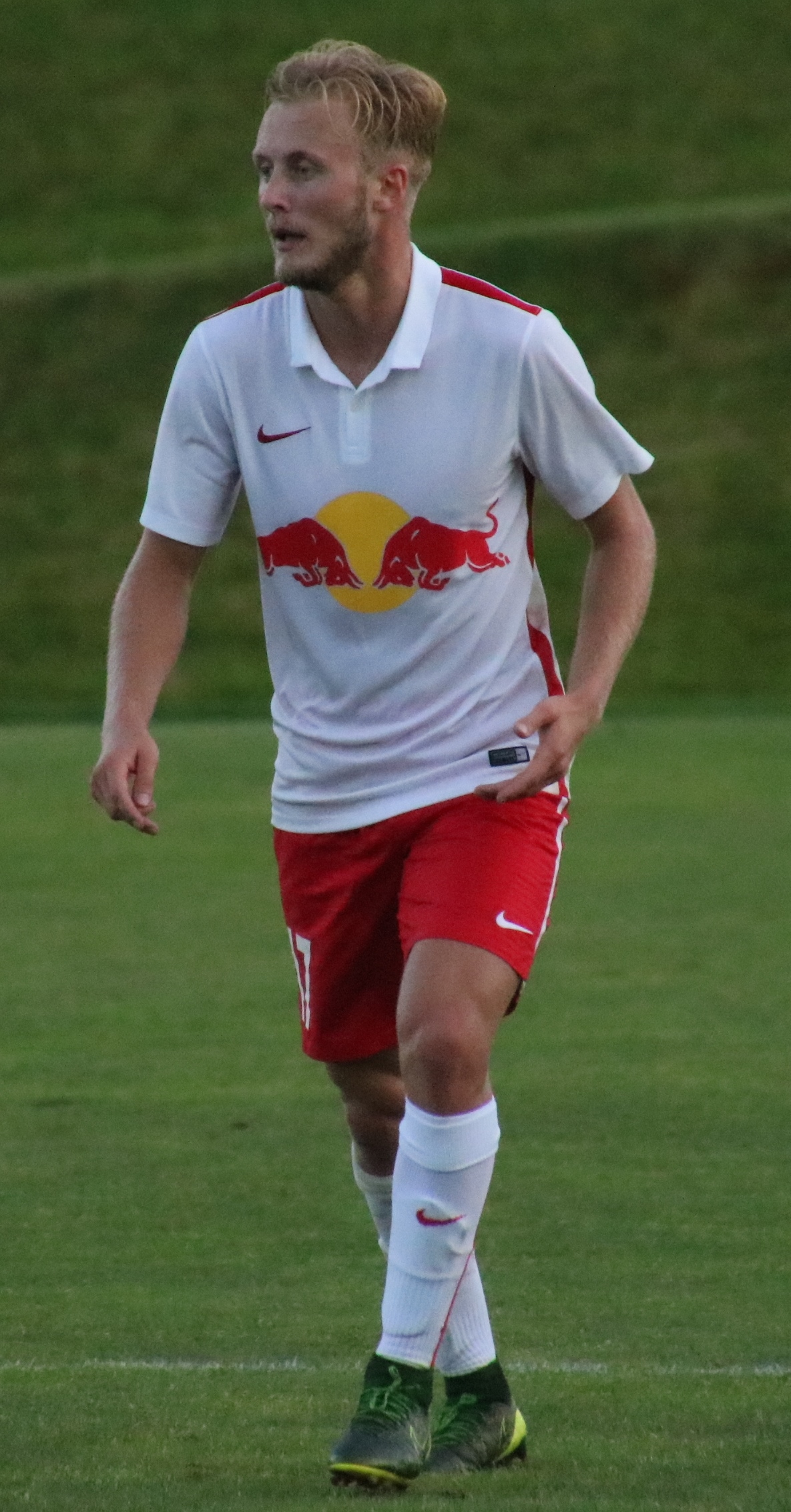

Personal information
- Full name: Christian Stephen Scales
- Date of birth: 3 December 1996 (age 29)
- Place of birth: Hertfordshire, England
- Height: 1.78 m (5 ft 10 in)
- Position: Left back

Youth career
- 2012–2014: Norwich City
- 2014–2015: Crystal Palace

Senior career*
Years	Team	Apps	(Gls)
2015–2016	Crystal Palace	0	(0)
2015	→ Crawley Town (loan)	8	(0)
2017	Whitehawk	6	(0)
2017–2018	Leyton Orient	0	(0)
2017	→ Harlow Town (loan)	1	(0)
2018	→ Harlow Town (loan)	13	(1)
2018–2019	Skellefteå	13	(3)
- * Club domestic league appearances and goals as of 09:13, 16 September 2019 (UTC)

Christian Stephen Scales (born 3 December 1996) is an English footballer who plays as a defender.

== Career ==
Scales was born in Hertfordshire and began his career at the Norwich City academy. He left for Crystal Palace in the summer of 2014 and signed a professional contract with the club in April 2015. On 20 August 2015, Scales joined League Two side Crawley Town on loan. He made his Football League debut on 22 August 2015 in a 3–0 win away at Cambridge United.

On 6 May 2016, it was announced that Scales was being released by Crystal Palace. Following a week's trial at FC Liefering who play in the First League, the second tier of Austrian football, he signed for National League South side Whitehawk in February 2017.

In July 2017, he signed a two-year contract with National League side Leyton Orient. He then went on a month's loan to Isthmian League Premier Division club Harlow Town, but was injured on his debut, the 2–0 win over Lowestoft Town on 26 August. He subsequently returned to Orient for treatment.

In February 2018, Scales returned on loan to Harlow after the completion of his recovery.

In December 2018, Scales joined Swedish Division 2 side Skellefteå on a two-year deal.

== Career statistics ==
As of 1 June 2017

Appearances and goals by club, season and competition
Club	Season	League			FA Cup		League Cup		Total	
Club	Season	Division	Apps	Goals	Apps	Goals	Apps	Goals	Apps	Goals
Crawley Town (loan)	2015–16	League Two	8	0	1	0	0	0	9	0
Whitehawk	2016–17	National League South	6	0	0	0	0	0	6	0
Career total			14	0	1	0	0	0	15	0
