= Matt Harrold =

English footballer (born 1984)

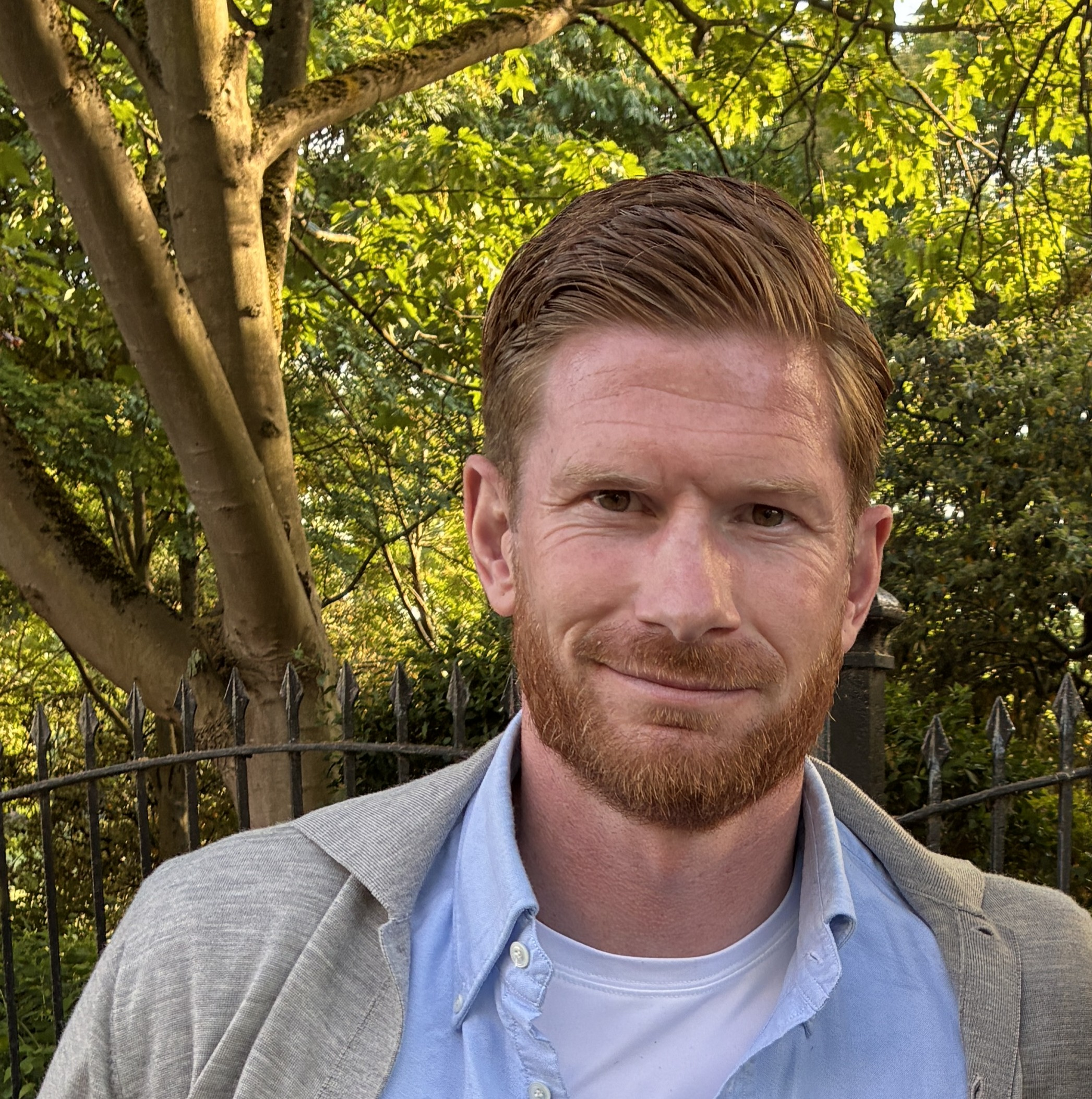
- Harrold in 2026

Personal information
- Full name: Matthew James Harrold
- Date of birth: 25 July 1984 (age 42)
- Place of birth: Leyton, London, England
- Height: 6 ft 1 in (1.85 m)
- Position: Forward

Team information
- Current team: AFC Bournemouth (loans manager)

Youth career
- –2001: Southend United

Senior career*
Years	Team	Apps	(Gls)
2001–2002	Southend United	0	(0)
2001	→ Grays Athletic (loan)	2	(0)
2001	→ Wingate & Finchley (loan)	20	(9)
2002–2003	Harlow Town	18	(5)
2003–2005	Brentford	32	(2)
2004–2005	→ Dagenham & Redbridge (loan)	4	(1)
2005	→ Grimsby Town (loan)	6	(2)
2005–2006	Yeovil Town	47	(9)
2006–2008	Southend United	52	(3)
2008–2010	Wycombe Wanderers	73	(17)
2010–2011	Shrewsbury Town	41	(8)
2011–2014	Bristol Rovers	76	(24)
2014–2017	Crawley Town	70	(9)
2015	→ Cambridge United (loan)	7	(1)
2017–2020	Leyton Orient	75	(9)
Total		523	(99)

Managerial career
- 2017: Crawley Town (caretaker)
- 2022: Leyton Orient (caretaker)
- * Club domestic league appearances and goals as of 17:30, 28 March 2020 (UTC)

Matthew James Harrold (born 25 July 1984) is an English former professional footballer who played as a forward and is currently loans manager at AFC Bournemouth.

Harrold has had numerous previous clubs including Wycombe Wanderers, Southend United, Grays Athletic, Harlow Town, Brentford, Yeovil Town, Shrewsbury Town, Crawley Town and Leyton Orient as well as loan spells at Grimsby Town, Dagenham & Redbridge and Cambridge United.

== Playing career ==
=== Early career ===
He is a former pupil of Trinity Catholic High School, Woodford Green, he was initially a product of Southend United's youth set-up, although he departed for non-league football and played at Grays Athletic, Wingate & Finchley and Harlow Town.

=== Brentford ===
==== 2003–04 season ====
Brentford signed Harrold from Harlow Town in July 2003. He showed early promise in the 2003–04 season when he scored a hat-trick against non-league Gainsborough Trinity in the FA Cup, which made him the youngest-ever Brentford player to score a hat-trick. Later that season he also scored crucial goals in the league against Colchester United and future club Wycombe Wanderers to help Brentford to safety.

==== 2004–05 season ====
The following season, 2004–05. he was loaned out twice. His first loan was to Dagenham & Redbridge in the Conference. He scored on his debut against Accrington Stanley but didn't score again in 3 more appearances for the club. Upon his return to Brentford he played as a substitute in their memorable 2–2 draw at Premier League side Southampton in the FA Cup fifth round. However shortly afterwards he was sent out on loan again, to Grimsby Town. He again scored on his debut, this time against Oxford United, and scored again in his second appearance against Boston United. However these would be his only 2 goals for the club and he returned to Brentford again to help in their promotion push. Brentford made it into the playoffs but lost in the semifinals to Sheffield Wednesday.

=== Yeovil Town ===
Harrold signed for Yeovil in 2005 for an undisclosed small fee. He was signed by manager Gary Johnson, but within months Johnson had left to become manager of Bristol City. However, Harrold went on to score 9 league goals in his only full season at the club. Highlights included a brace in a 4–3 win at Scunthorpe United and a goal against former club Brentford.

=== Southend United ===
Harrold joined Southend after a long-running summer transfer saga which ended with him being signed an hour before the transfer deadline on 31 August 2006. He scored his first goal for Southend against West Bromwich Albion on 16 September 2006. Over the next two seasons he only managed 5 further goals in all competitions.

=== Wycombe Wanderers ===
==== 2008–09 season ====
Harrold playing for Wycombe Wanderers in 2009

Harrold joined Wycombe on 1 September 2008 on a free transfer on a two-year contract after being released by Southend. On 4 October 2008, he scored his first goal in a Wycombe shirt in a 3–1 home win over Bournemouth. On 10 November 2008, he went on to score his first hat trick for the club on 10 November in an FA Cup first round match against AFC Wimbledon, which Wycombe went on to win 4–1. 2 weeks later he netted 2 goals, which led to a 4–2 win over Port Vale. He added another goal to his tally a week later in a 2–0 win away at Notts County. On 20 December 2008, he scored the match winning goal for Wycombe away at Shrewsbury. 6 days later he netted Wycombes only goal in a 1–1 draw with Exeter City. 15-day later on 3 January 2009, he scored for Wycombe in 2–0 win over Bury. On 31 January 2009, he scored Wycombe's only goal of the match in a 3–1 loss away at Bournemouth. 7 Days later he scored an 80th-minute goal which won Wycombe's match against Accrington Stanley; this was the last goal Matt Harrold scored for Wycombe in the 2008–09 season.

==== 2009–10 season ====
He scored his first goal for Wycombe in 2009–10 season in 1–1 draw against his former club Southend, on 18 August 2009. 4 days later he scored in Wycombe's 5–2 loss at Carrow Road. Harrold was released by Wycombe on 11 May 2010, after the club's relegation to League Two.

=== Shrewsbury Town ===
==== 2010–11 season ====
In July 2010, Harrold was on trial at Swedish Superettan club Örgryte IS, before joining Shrewsbury Town. On 10 August 2010, he scored his first goal for Shrewsbury in a 4–3 win over Charlton Athletic. On 21 August 2010, he was red carded in 1–1 draw against Aldershot after receiving his second yellow card. On 28 August 2010, Harrold scored a goal in the 4–0 rout against Stockport County.

=== Bristol Rovers ===
==== 2011–12 season ====
Harrold signed for Bristol Rovers in June 2011, for an undisclosed fee on a two-year contract. He scored his first goal for the club on his debut against Wimbledon, in which they won 3–2. He scored his second goal of the season against in the 2–2 draw on 10 September 2011 against Bradford City. His first home goal won the game for Bristol Rovers against Northampton Town. He converted his first penalty in a 2–0 home win against Dagenham & Redbridge, on 29 October 2011. On 26 December 2011, he scored 2 first half goals in a home match against West Country rivals Plymouth Argyle, which rovers went on to lose 3–2 after leading 2–0 at half time. 5 days later he scored a goal in Bristol Rovers 5–2 loss against Crewe Alexandra at the Memorial Stadium. He went on a 5-game goal drought before scoring his next goal, which was scored against local rivals Torquay United. 10 days later he scored another goal against Plymouth Argyle at Home Park on 20 March 2012, which Rovers drew 1–1. On 14 April 2012, he added two more goals to his tally in 7–1 rout against Burton Albion, and another two in a 5–1 victory for Bristol Rovers at home to Accrington Stanley.

In his first season at Bristol Rovers, he went on to score 18 goals and finished as the club's leading scorer for the season.

==== 2012–13 season ====
Harrold started the season with goals against Royal Marines, Tamworth, Paulton Rovers and Coventry City in pre-season friendly matches.

On 21 August 2012, Harrold scored his first goal in the 2012–13 season for Bristol Rovers, in a 1–1 draw away at Barnet. On 15 September 2012 in a 4–0 loss against Gillingham, Harrold sustained a severe knee injury and was unlikely to feature in any more games in 2012–13 season for Bristol Rovers. However, Harrold made a substitute appearance in the final game of the season against Torquay, scoring in the last minute, to the delight of Rovers fans, players and staff.

=== Crawley Town ===
On 27 June 2014, Harrold joined League One side Crawley Town after impressing manager John Gregory while playing for Rovers against Crawley in the FA Cup the previous season.

==== 2014–15 season ====
Harrold made his first appearance for the club on 30 August 2014, coming on as a 77th minute substitute for Gwion Edwards away at Milton Keynes Dons. He scored his first goal for Crawley on 18 October 2014; a 55th-minute strike in a 5–3 defeat at Notts County. In a 2–2 draw at home to Milton Keynes Dons on 10 January 2015, Harrold played 50 minutes in goal following Crawley goalkeeper Brian Jensen dislocating his finger. Despite conceding a last-minute equaliser, Harrold won the Man of the Match award. After the match, Harrold told BBC Surrey "I've never played in goal before. Not even in training. I got pressured into it because everyone just looked at me and said 'you're big'. It's a bit embarrassing because it's my first man of the match for the club."

In his first season at Crawley, he made 23 appearances for the club, scoring once.

==== Cambridge United (loan) ====
On 23 February 2015, Harrold joined League Two side Cambridge United on a loan until the end of the season. He scored once in 7 appearances for Cambridge.

==== 2015–16 season ====
Harrold scored his first goal of the 2015–16 for Crawley on 29 September 2015, scoring Crawley's third of the match in a 3–0 win at Newport County. He suffered a knee injury in April 2016, ruling him out for the rest of the season. Harrold made 39 appearances in all competitions, scoring 9 times. Harrold signed a new one-year contract in June 2016, keeping him at the club until the summer of 2017.

==== 2016–17 season ====
Following a long recovery from his knee injury, Harrold suffered an Achilles tendon injury in September 2016. Harrold suffered a second Achilles tendon injury in December 2016, ruling him out for the following three months. Following the sacking of Dermot Drummy in May 2017, Harold was placed in caretaker charge of Crawley for their final game of the season. In the 2016–17, Harrold made 15 appearances, scoring once. He signed a one-year contract extension in June 2017.

==== 2017–18 season ====
Harrold made two league appearances for Crawley prior to his transfer to Leyton Orient. Upon signing for Leyton Orient, Harrold told the club's website "I would just like to thank everyone at Crawley Town for the past three seasons, I have loved playing for the club."

=== Leyton Orient ===
On 31 August 2017, Harrold signed for Leyton Orient on a two-year deal following three seasons at Crawley. He made his debut for the club 2 days later in a 4–1 home victory over Guiseley in which Harrold headed in the third for Orient with Macauley Bonne grabbing a hat-trick.

== Coaching career ==
In August 2020, Harrold joined the coaching staff at Leyton Orient, putting an end to his playing career.

On 23 February 2022, following the sacking of first-team manager Kenny Jackett, Harrold was made interim manager of Leyton Orient, assisted by academy manager Brian Saah. His first match in caretaker charge saw his side lose at home to fellow relegation battlers Carlisle United, leaving the O's just three points clear of the relegation zone. On 9 March 2022, the permanent appointment of Richie Wellens was announced with Harrold returning to his original role in the coaching set-up.

On 19 April 2024, Leyton Orient confirmed that Harrold would depart the club at the end of the 2023–24 season to join Premier League club AFC Bournemouth.

== Style of play ==
Former manager Paul Buckle said "He is strong, and solid target man but he is also good with the ball into his feet - he is a class act", whilst his manager at Crawley, Dermot Drummy, stated that Harrold could 'handle himself physically', and that his touch and positional and team play is 'excellent'.

== Career statistics ==
As of match played 24 March 2018.

Appearances and goals by club, season and competition
Club	Season	League			FA Cup		League Cup		Other		Total	
Club	Season	Division	Apps	Goals	Apps	Goals	Apps	Goals	Apps	Goals	Apps	Goals
Brentford	2003–04	Second Division	13	2	1	3	0	0	1 (Note: Appearance(s) in Football League Trophy)	0	15	5
Brentford	2004–05	League One	19	0	4	0	0	0	1	0	24	0
Brentford	Total		32	2	5	3	0	0	2	0	39	5
Dagenham & Redbridge (loan)	2004–05	Conference Premier	4	1	0	0	—		0	0	4	1
Grimsby Town (loan)	2004–05	League Two	6	2	0	0	0	0	0	0	6	2
Yeovil Town	2005–06	League One	42	9	3	0	2	0	1	0	48	9
Yeovil Town	2006–07	League One	5	0	0	0	1	1	0	0	6	1
Yeovil Town	Total		47	9	3	0	3	1	1	0	54	10
Southend United	2006–07	Championship	36	3	2	0	0	0	—		38	3
Southend United	2007–08	League One	16	0	2	1	2	2	1	0	21	3
Southend United	Total		52	3	4	1	2	2	1	0	59	6
Wycombe Wanderers	2008–09	League Two	37	9	2	3	0	0	0	0	39	12
Wycombe Wanderers	2009–10	League One	36	8	2	2	0	0	0	0	38	10
Wycombe Wanderers	Total		73	17	4	5	0	0	0	0	77	22
Shrewsbury Town	2010–11	League Two	41	8	1	0	1	1	4 (Note: Two Appearances each in Football League Trophy and League Two play-offs)	0	47	9
Bristol Rovers	2011–12	League Two	40	16	2	0	1	1	1	1	44	18
Bristol Rovers	2012–13	League Two	6	2	0	0	1	0	0	0	7	2
Bristol Rovers	2013–14	League Two	30	6	5	1	0	0	1	0	36	7
Bristol Rovers	Total		76	24	7	1	2	1	2	1	87	27
Crawley Town	2014–15	League One	20	1	1	0	0	0	2	0	23	1
Crawley Town	2015–16	League Two	37	8	1	1	1	0	0	0	39	9
Crawley Town	2016–17	League Two	11	0	2	1	1	0	1 (Note: Appearance(s) in EFL Trophy)	0	15	1
Crawley Town	2017–18	League Two	2	0	0	0	1	0	0	0	3	0
Crawley Town	Total		70	9	4	2	3	0	3	0	80	11
Cambridge United (loan)	2014–15	League Two	7	1	0	0	0	0	0	0	7	1
Leyton Orient	2017–18	National League	24	3	1	0	—		5 (Note: Appearance(s) in FA Trophy)	2	30	5
Leyton Orient	2018–19	National League	27	4	1	0	—		7	3	35	7
Leyton Orient	2019–20	League Two	24	2	1	0	0	0	2	0	27	2
Leyton Orient	Total		75	9	3	0	0	0	14	5	92	14
Career total			483	85	31	12	11	5	27	6	552	108

== Honours ==
Wycombe Wanderers

- League Two promotion: 2008–09

Leyton Orient

- National League: 2018–19
- FA Trophy runner-up: 2018–19
