= Ryan Richefond =

English footballer

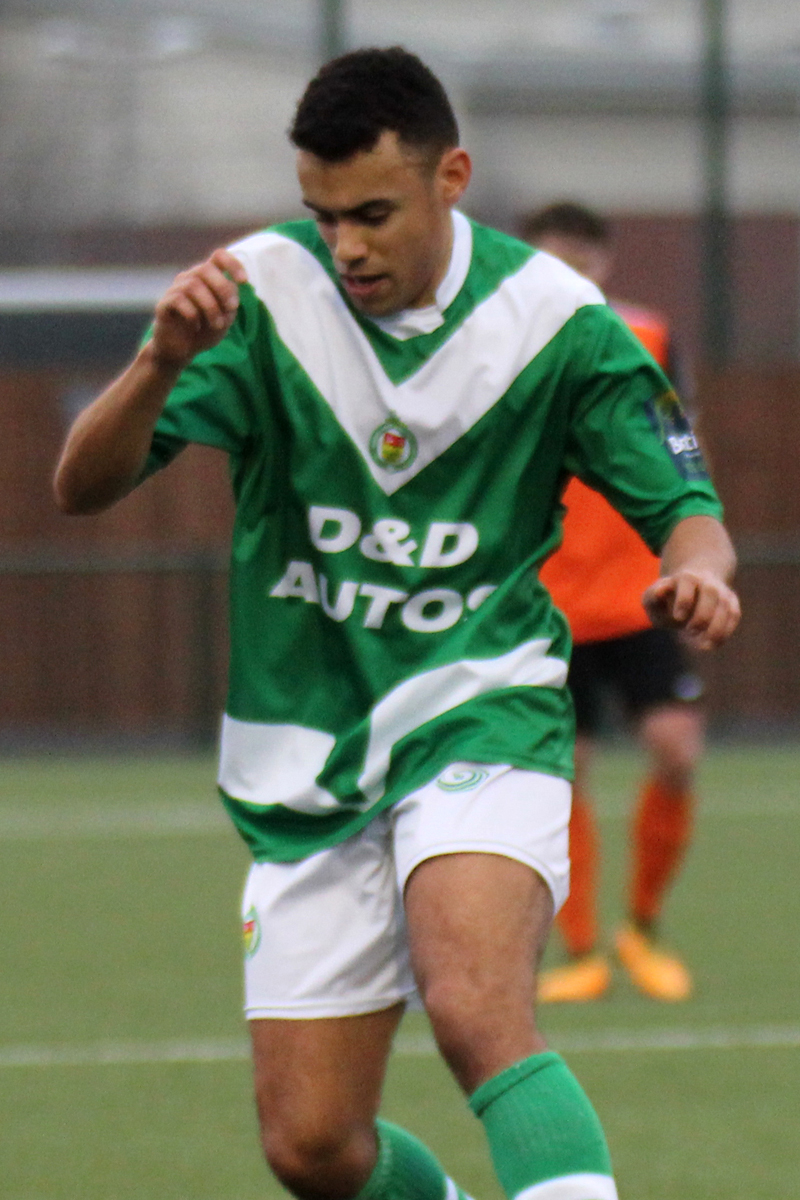
- Richefond playing for Ashford United in 2018

Personal information
- Full name: Ryan James Richefond
- Date of birth: 16 June 1996 (age 30)
- Place of birth: Tower Hamlets, England
- Height: 5 ft 7 1/2 in (1.71 m)
- Position: Midfielder

Team information
- Current team: Cheshunt

Youth career
- 2012–2014: Crawley Town

Senior career*
Years	Team	Apps	(Gls)
2014–2015	Crawley Town	3	(0)
2015	→ Leatherhead (loan)	3	(0)
2015–2016	Loxwood	14	(2)
2015–2016	→ Worthing (dual reg.)	19	(3)
2016	Grays Athletic	9	(0)
2016–2017	Margate	10	(0)
2017	Bishop's Stortford	29	(0)
2017–2018	Ashford United	13	(0)
2018	Leatherhead	5	(0)
2018–2019	South Park	27	(1)
2019	Hornchurch	4	(0)
2020	Staines Town	2	(0)
2020–2021	Maidstone United	1	(0)
2021–2022	Brentwood Town	5	(1)
2022	Barking	10	(0)
2024–2025	Basildon United	18	(0)
2025	Bowers & Pitsea	6	(0)
2025-Present	Cheshunt	3	(0)
- * Club domestic league appearances and goals

Ryan James Richefond (born 16 June 1996) is an English footballer who plays as a midfielder for Cheshunt F.C. and Football Coach. He previously coached in the Academy and First Team at Leyton Orient, a position he held between June 2019 and September 2025.

== Playing career ==
Richefond signed a one-year professional contract at Crawley Town in April 2014 after captaining the youth team. He made his debut for the Reds on 2 September 2014, coming on for Matt Harrold 71 minutes into a 2–0 win over Cambridge United in a Football League Trophy First Round match at Broadfield Stadium.

Richefond later joined Isthmian League Premier Division side Leatherhead on a one-month loan in February.

On 1 July, Richefond was released from Crawley Town. After leaving Crawley, Richefond signed a contract with Loxwood to join up with former youth team manager Mark Beard. After being a regular in the team he attracted attention from Worthing for whom Richefond later signed a dual contract with.

In March 2016, Richefond left Worthing to sign for Grays Athletic making his debut the following day. The following season, 2016–17, Richefond rejoined Grays in November.

In November 2016, Richefond signed for National League South team Margate. Towards the end of the season he signed for Bishops Stortford where he remained for the start of the 2017–18 season.

After a spell with Ashford United, Richefond joined Leatherhead ahead of the 2018–19 campaign.

In March 2020, Richefond joined Staines Town. He made two appearances for the club in the same month. In September 2020, he moved to Cambridge City. One month later, Richefond signed for Maidstone United.

In July and October 2021, Richenfond played a few friendly games for his former club Worthing.

In October 2021 Richefond had spells with Brentwood Town and Barking, moving to the latter in March 2022.

After a short spell with Isthmian Premier Division side Bowers and Pitsea, Richefond signed for Cheshunt FC as a player during the festive period in 2025. In June 2026 he was appointed Player/Assistant Manager by the Club.

== Personal life ==
He graduated from Staffordshire University in 2021 having studied for a BA (Hons) in Professional Sports Writing & Broadcasting, through a partnership between the University and the Professional Footballers' Association.

== Career statistics ==
As of match played 15 September 2017

Appearances and goals by club, season and competition
Club	Season	League			FA Cup		League Cup		Other		Total	
Club	Season	Division	Apps	Goals	Apps	Goals	Apps	Goals	Apps	Goals	Apps	Goals
Crawley Town	2014–15	League One	0	0	0	0	0	0	3 (Note: Appearance in Football League Trophy)	1	3	1
Leatherhead (loan)	2014–15	Isthmian League Premier Division	3	0	0	0	0	0	0	0	3	0
Loxwood	2015–16	Sussex Premier Division	14	2	0	0	0	0	5	0	19	2
Worthing	2015–16	Isthmian League Division One South	19	3	0	0	0	0	0	0	19	3
Grays Athletic	2015–16	Isthmian League Premier Division	9	0	0	0	0	0	0	0	9	0
Margate	2016–17	National League South	10	0	0	0	0	0	3	0	13	0
Bishops Stortford	2016–17	National League South	5	0	0	0	0	0	9	8	14	8
Bishops Stortford	2017–18	Southern Football League Premier Division	15	1	1	0	0	0	4	1	19	2
Bishops Stortford	Total		29	0	1	0	0	0	12	1	33	9
Ashford United	2017–18	Isthmian League Division One South	14	0	0	0	0	0	0	0	14	0
Leatherhead	2018–19	Isthmian League Premier Division	5	0	0	0	0	0	1	1	6	1
South Park	2018–19	Isthmian League South Division	27	2	0	0	0	0	0	0	27	2
Hornchurch	2019–20	Isthmian League Premier Division	4	0	0	0	0	0	1	0	5	0
Maidstone United	2020–21	National League South	1	0	0	0	0	0	4	0	5	0
Brentwood Town	2021–22	Isthmian League North	5	0	0	0	0	0	3	1	8	1
Barking FC	2021–22	Isthmian League North	9	0	0	0	0	0	1	0	10	0
Witham Town	2022–23	Isthmian League North	23	1	1	0	0	0	2	1	26	2
Basildon United	2024–25	Isthmian League North	18	0	0	0	0	0	4	0	22	0
Bowers and Pitsea	2024–25	Isthmian Premier League	6	0	0	0	0	0	0	0	6	0
Cheshunt FC	2025–26	Isthmian Premier League	1	0	0	0	0	0	4	0	5	0
Cheshunt FC	2026–27	Isthmian Premier League	2	0	0	0	0	0	2	0	4	0
Career total			190	11	2	0	0	0	46	13	238	24
