= Callum Preston =

British footballer (born 1995)

Personal information
- Full name: Callum Preston
- Date of birth: 7 November 1995 (age 31)
- Place of birth: Stafford, England
- Height: 6 ft 0 in (1.84 m)
- Position: Goalkeeper

Youth career
- –: The New Saints
- –: Liverpool
- 2008–2014: Birmingham City

Senior career*
Years	Team	Apps	(Gls)
2014–2015	Birmingham City	0	(0)
2014	→ Worcester City (loan)	1	(0)
2015	→ AFC Telford United (loan)	0	(0)
2015–2016	Crawley Town	9	(0)
2016	Altrincham	1	(0)
2016–2017	Stevenage	0	(0)
2017	Wrexham	1	(0)
2019	Aberystwyth Town	0	(0)

International career
2014	Wales U19	1	(0)
- * Club domestic league appearances and goals as of June 2019

Callum Preston (born 7 November 1995) is a footballer who plays as a goalkeeper.

He turned professional with Birmingham City, and had loan spells with Worcester City and AFC Telford United, but was released in 2015 without appearing for his parent club. He spent the next season with Crawley Town of League Two, for whom he made ten first-team appearances, and had a brief spell with National League North club Altrincham in August 2016.

Although born in Stafford, in England, Preston has represented Wales at under-19 level.

== Club career ==
Preston was born in Stafford, England, but was brought up in Welshpool, Wales, where he attended Welshpool High School and played for the local cricket club. He was on the books of both Liverpool and The New Saints before joining Birmingham City F.C.'s youth academy in 2008. He took up a scholarship in July 2012.

In 2014, he spent a short spell on work experience at Conference North club Worcester City, for whom he played twice, once in the league and once in the Worcestershire Senior Cup, while the club was without all its senior goalkeepers. He signed his first professional contract, of one year with the option of a second, in June 2014. In February 2015, Preston joined Conference Premier club AFC Telford United on a month's loan. He played in the final of the Shropshire Senior Cup, a 3–1 defeat to Shrewsbury Town's youth team, but remained an unused substitute in league matches.

At the end of the 2014–15 season, Birmingham decided against taking up their option for another year on Preston's contract. After a trial, he signed a one-year contract with League Two club Crawley Town. He began the season as second-choice goalkeeper, behind Newcastle United loanee Freddie Woodman, but when Woodman was away on international duty with the England under-19 team, he made his senior Crawley debut in the Football League Trophy. The match, on 6 October 2015, ended as a 3–0 defeat at home to League One visitors Southend United. With Woodman still absent, Preston made his Football League debut four days later in a 3–2 home win against Leyton Orient. The same day, Newcastle United goalkeeper Tim Krul suffered a ruptured anterior cruciate ligament, so Woodman was recalled by his parent club, leaving Preston as Crawley's only senior goalkeeper. Crawley signed the experienced Darryl Flahavan in Woodman's place, so Preston returned to the bench.

Preston returned to the starting eleven for the 2–1 win against Stevenage on 26 December, and kept his place for the next match two days later even though Flahavan's injured ankle had recovered enough for him to be named among the substitutes. After Flahavan took too long deciding whether to accept a contract extension, the club withdrew the offer, and Preston started the match away to Yeovil Town on 23 January 2016. At the end of the 2015–16 season, Preston was released by Crawley having made 10 appearances for the Sussex club.

On 3 August 2016, Preston joined National League North club Altrincham as competition for Andrew Dawber, but he played only once, in a 6–0 defeat at home to AFC Fylde on 16 August, and was released a few days later. He returned to the Football League in September, when he joined Stevenage of League Two as goalkeeping cover on non-contract terms.

In September 2017, Preston joined Wrexham on non-contract terms as cover for an injury to Chris Dunn.

After taking time out from football to concentrate on his degree in professional sports writing and broadcasting, Preston signed for Aberystwyth Town of the Welsh Premier League in January 2019. After playing one game for Aberystwyth in the Welsh Cup, Preston left the club.

== International career ==
Preston made his international debut for Wales under-19s in a friendly against their Montenegrin counterparts in April 2014. He was placed on standby for the elite round European qualifiers in May but was not called upon.

== Career statistics ==
As of match played 12 September 2017

Appearances and goals by club, season and competition
Club	Season	League			FA Cup		League Cup		Other		Total	
Club	Season	Division	Apps	Goals	Apps	Goals	Apps	Goals	Apps	Goals	Apps	Goals
Birmingham City	2013–14	Championship	0	0	0	0	0	0	—		0	0
Birmingham City	2014–15	Championship	0	0	0	0	0	0	—		0	0
Birmingham City	Total		0	0	0	0	0	0	—		0	0
Worcester City (loan)	2013–14	Conference North	1	0	—		—		1 (Note: Appearance in Worcestershire Senior Cup)	0	2	0
AFC Telford United (loan)	2014–15	Conference Premier	0	0	—		—		1 (Note: Appearance in Shropshire Senior Cup)	0	1	0
Crawley Town	2015–16	League Two	9	0	0	0	0	0	1 (Note: Appearance in Football League Trophy)	0	10	0
Altrincham	2016–17	National League North	1	0	—		—		—		1	0
Stevenage	2016–17	League Two	0	0	0	0	—		1 (Note: Appearance in EFL Trophy)	0	1	0
Wrexham	2017–18	National League	1	0	0	0	—		0	0	1	0
Career total			12	0	0	0	0	0	4	0	16	0
