= Mitch Hancox =

English footballer (born 1993)

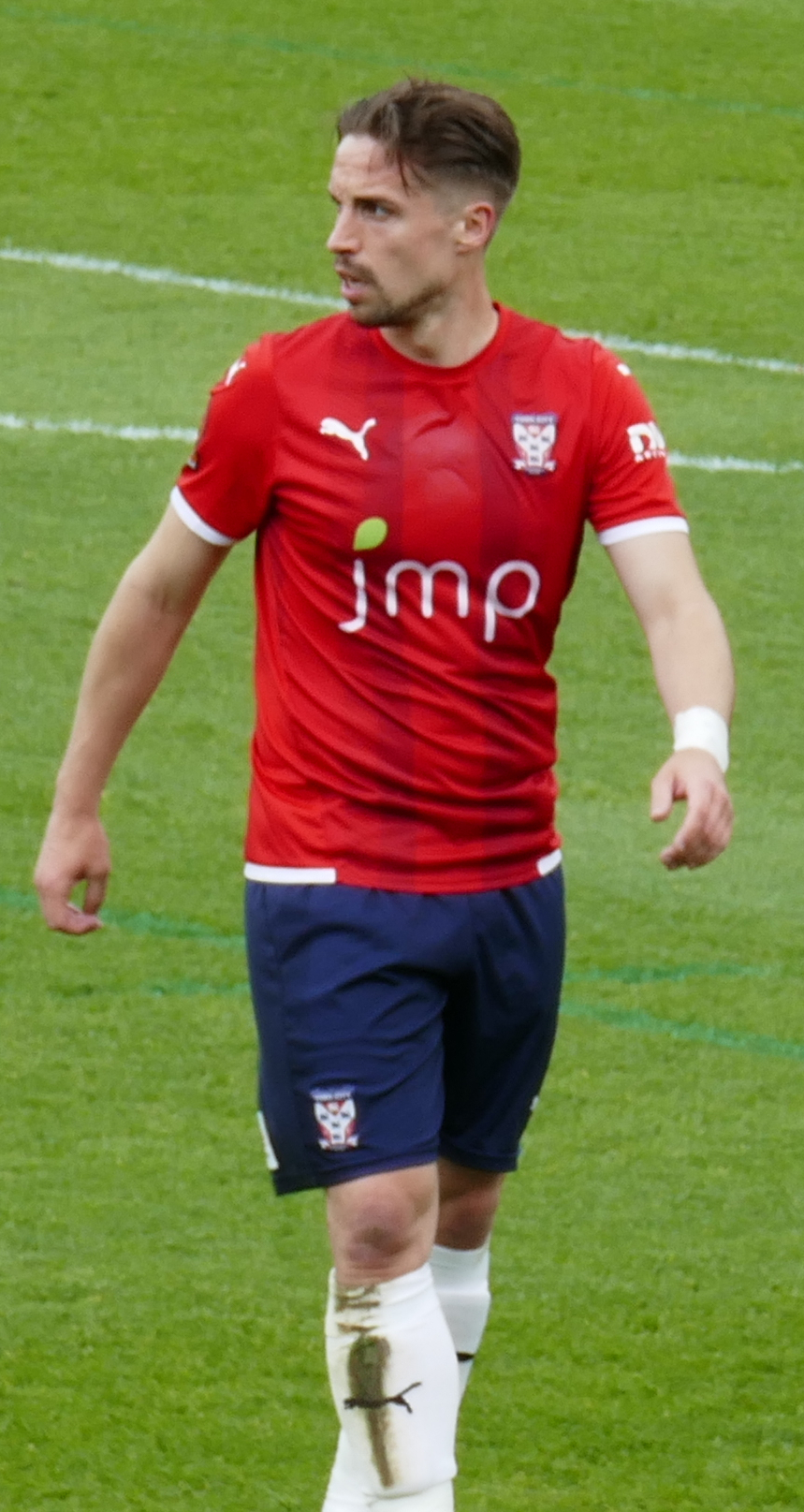
- Hancox playing for York City in 2022

Personal information
- Full name: Mitchell John Hancox
- Date of birth: 9 November 1993 (age 32)
- Place of birth: Solihull, England
- Height: 5 ft 10 in (1.78 m)
- Positions: Left-back; central midfielder

Team information
- Current team: Spennymoor Town
- Number: 18

Youth career
- 2001–2011: Birmingham City

Senior career*
Years	Team	Apps	(Gls)
2011–2016	Birmingham City	33	(0)
2015–2016	→ Crawley Town (loan)	15	(2)
2016–2018	Macclesfield Town	77	(13)
2018–2019	Milton Keynes Dons	1	(0)
2019–2021	Solihull Moors	39	(1)
2019–2020	→ Harrogate Town (loan)	5	(0)
2021–2022	Hereford	7	(0)
2021–2022	→ York City (loan)	28	(8)
2022–2024	York City	40	(2)
2023–2024	→ Hartlepool United (loan)	7	(1)
2024	Altrincham	7	(0)
2024–2025	Chester	15	(0)
2025–	Spennymoor Town	32	(1)
2025	→ Morpeth Town (loan)	6	(1)
- * Club domestic league appearances and goals as of 16:22, 24 May 2026 (UTC)

Mitchell John Hancox (born 9 November 1993) is an English professional footballer who plays as a left-back or central midfielder for National League North club Spennymoor Town. He has played in the Football League for Birmingham City, Crawley Town and Milton Keynes Dons.

Hancox began his career with hometown club Birmingham City, for whom he made his Football League debut in October 2012. In the 2015–16 season, he spent three months on loan to League Two club Crawley Town. Released by Birmingham at the end of that season, Hancox signed for National League club Macclesfield Town in August 2016. After two years, during which he helped Macclesfield win the 2017–18 National League title, he moved on to Milton Keynes Dons. Hancox joined his Solihull Moors in May 2019, spent time on loan to another National League club, Harrogate Town at the end of that year, and was released in 2021. He then signed for Hereford, and joined York City on loan later that year, helping them to promotion to the National League. York signed him permanently in June 2022, loaned him to Hartlepool United in 2023–24, and released him in March 2024. Hancox finished that season with Altrincham and spent the first half of the next with Chester.

== Early life ==
Hancox was born in Solihull, West Midlands. He has three older brothers; the eldest, Matthew, was seriously wounded in 2011 while serving in Afghanistan with the Royal Marines. Hancox was recruited into Birmingham City's youth system at the age of eight after being noticed playing in a six-a-side competition. As a youngster, he was a Birmingham City supporter, and particularly admired full-backs Jeff Kenna and Martin Grainger and wing-back Stan Lazaridis.

While still a 15-year-old Lyndon School student, he played for Birmingham's reserve team. He was picked out as "one of the bright spots of the evening from a home perspective" in a heavy defeat to Arsenal in the 2009–10 Premier Reserve League, and described by then Academy manager Terry Westley as "one of the few players to come out with any credit" from a defeat to Leamington in the Birmingham Senior Cup. On leaving school, he began a two-year scholarship with Birmingham City in July 2010.

== Career ==
=== Birmingham City ===
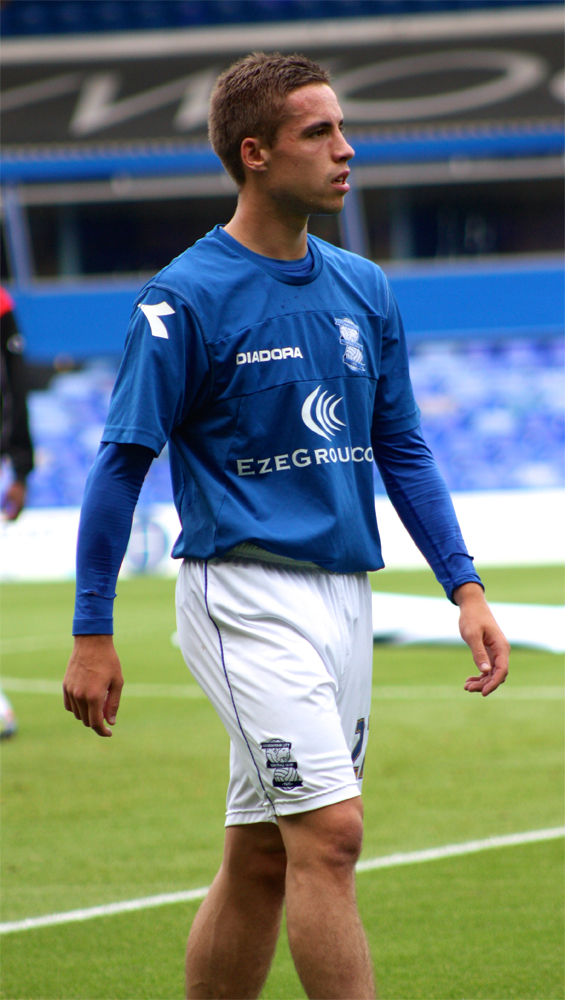
Hancox with Birmingham City in 2012

His first competitive involvement with Birmingham City's first team came when he was an unused substitute for the 2011–12 Europa League play-off round second leg against Nacional. Hancox signed his first professional contract, of six months, in May 2012, and was given a first-team squad number in August of that year.

Hancox made his competitive debut in the 1–0 home defeat by Huddersfield Town in the Championship on 6 October, as an 80th-minute substitute for the injured Curtis Davies. He played at left-back, allowing Paul Robinson to move to centre-back, and according to the Birmingham Mail, "can be pleased with his urgent and determined contribution in the last 10 minutes. He's only on a six-month contract but would sweat blood for his boyhood club." A few days later, he was given a six-month extension to his contract. When Robinson took over from Steven Caldwell as first-choice centre-back, Hancox was able to establish himself at left-back. He ended the season with 20 appearances, including 14 starts, and signed a new three-year contract.

With David Murphy still recovering from injury, Hancox hoped to establish himself as first choice at left-back, but a bruised testicle sustained in training and the loan signing of Shane Ferguson obstructed his progress. His first appearance of the season was in mid-September, as a substitute with Birmingham already 3–0 down at Burnley, followed by two League Cup ties, the second of which, at home to Stoke City, was 4–4 after extra time. Hancox volunteered to take the first penalty in the shootout, but his powerful kick struck the top of the crossbar and went over; Birmingham went on to lose the shootout. A run of games in November was halted by a knee injury, and ankle damage put an end to another run in the new year. He returned for the last few matches of the season, with Birmingham in danger of relegation. Needing at least a point from the final fixture, away to Bolton Wanderers and for other results to go in their favour, Hancox came on at half-time, and two minutes after Bolton took a two-goal lead, he crossed for Nikola Žigić to score with a header. Well into stoppage time, Paul Caddis scored the equaliser that kept Birmingham in the second tier.

In the 2014 close season, Lee Clark signed left-back Jonathan Grounds, who was almost ever-present under the management both of Clark and his successor Gary Rowett. Hancox played only one first-team match in 2014–15, in the FA Cup against Blyth Spartans, but he was a member of the 2015 Birmingham Senior Cup-winning team, consisting mainly of reserve-team players but also including first-teamers Matt Green and Žigić, who was making his last appearance for the club.

==== Crawley Town (loan) ====
After just one League Cup appearance in 2015–16, Hancox joined League Two club Crawley Town on a month's loan on 2 October 2015. He went straight into the starting eleven for the next day's visit to Plymouth Argyle, which Crawley lost 2–1 to a very late goal. In his second League Two match, at home to Leyton Orient, he scored his first senior goal. The score was 1–1 when Orient's goalkeeper Alex Cisak put the ball behind from Hancox's cross. Hancox himself took the corner, and when it was cleared he hit the loose ball past Cisak at his near post. He then made the pass that put Rhys Murphy through on goal, Murphy was fouled for a penalty that put Crawley two goals ahead, and the team held on for a 3–2 win. After he started all seven of Crawley's matches during his first month with the club, his loan was extended for a second month, and then a third. He finished his loan spell with two goals from sixteen appearances in all competitions.

Hancox played no more first-team football after returning to Birmingham. His last appearance for the club was as captain of the reserve team in the 2016 Birmingham Senior Cup final defeat to National League North champions Solihull Moors. Anxious for regular football, he was released when his contract expired at the end of the season; he had been with the club for fourteen years, and made 40 first-team appearances without scoring.

=== Macclesfield Town ===
Hancox signed for National League club Macclesfield Town on 4 August 2016. He made his debut two days later in the opening match of the season, a 2–1 win against Torquay United, but in his third match, a 3–1 defeat of Braintree Town, he conceded a penalty and was sent off for two yellow cards. In December 2016, Hancox signed a new deal with Macclesfield to run until the end of the 2017–18 season. As well as at left-back, he also featured as a holding midfielder for Macclesfield. He finished his first season with 38 National League appearances and 6 goals, which included a hat-trick against Boreham Wood in March 2017, and helped his team reach the 2017 FA Trophy final against York City. He was fouled for the free kick that led to Rhys Browne making the score 1–1, but Macclesfield finished on the losing side.

Hancox scored his second hat-trick for Macclesfield on 1 January 2018 in a 4–1 win away to FC Halifax Town. He finished the 2017–18 season with 7 goals in 39 appearances as Macclesfield were promoted to League Two as National League champions.

=== Milton Keynes Dons ===
Hancox rejected Macclesfield's offer of a new contract, and signed for newly-relegated League Two club Milton Keynes Dons on 21 June 2018 on a one-year contract. However, following limited first-team opportunities, Hancox was one of ten players released by the club at the end of the 2018–19 season.

=== Solihull Moors ===
Hancox signed for National League club Solihull Moors on 24 May 2019 on a two-year contract. He made nine league appearances in the first few weeks of the season, but only two were starts. After two months during which his only appearance was in the Scottish Challenge Cup – Solihull Moors were one of eight non-Scottish participants – he joined another National League team, Harrogate Town on loan until 5 January 2020; striker Sam Jones made a similar move in the opposite direction. He made five National League appearances for Harrogate and a further ten for Solihull Moors before the season was curtailed because of the COVID-19 pandemic. In 2020–21 he was a regular in the matchday squad, and made 20 league appearances of which nine were as a starter, before being released when his contract expired at the end of the season.

=== Hereford and York City ===
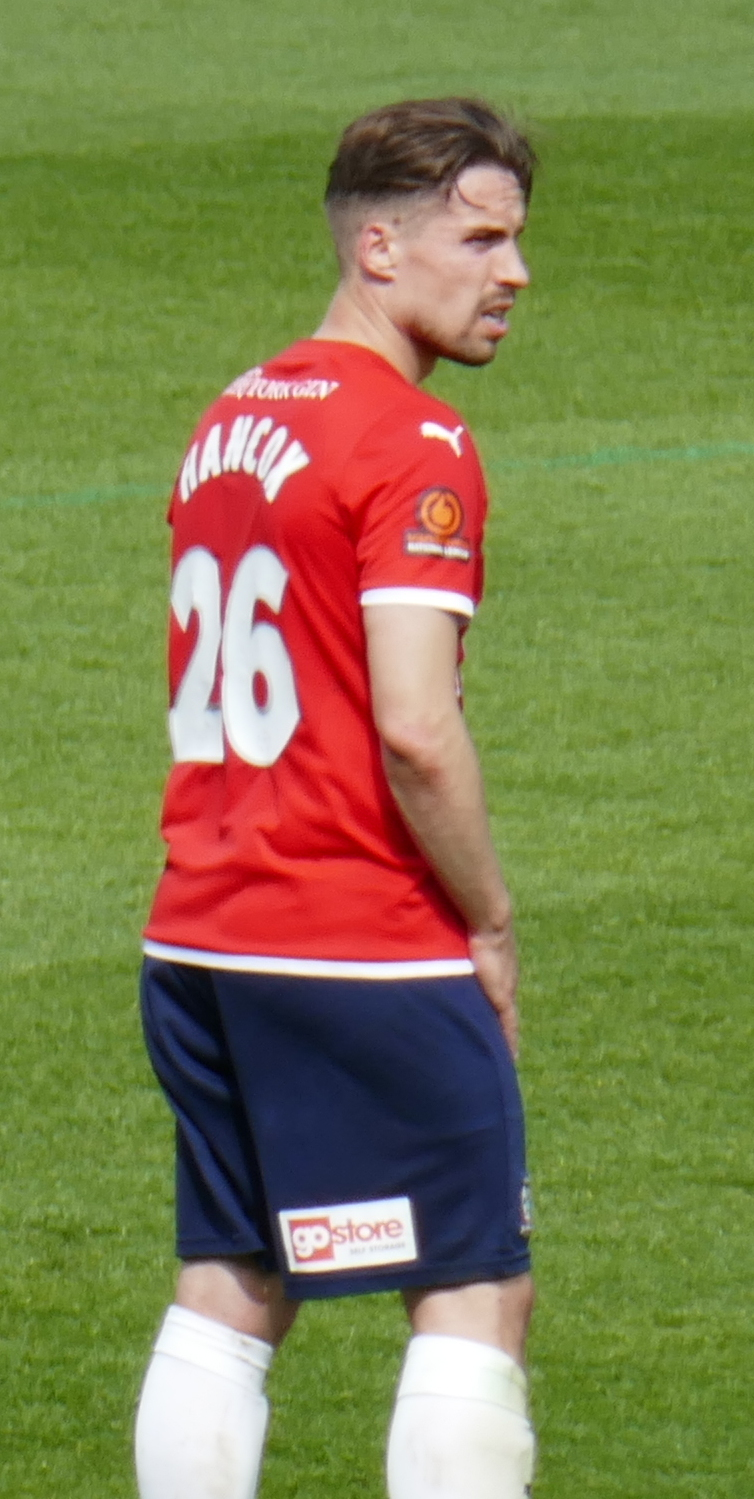
Hancox playing for York City in 2022

Hancox signed for National League North club Hereford on 18 June 2021. Having begun the season as a regular in the side, his appearances became intermittent, and in late October Hancox went on a month's loan at another National North club, York City, managed by Steve Watson, with whom he had worked at Birmingham and Macclesfield. His loan was extended initially until January 2022 and then for the rest of the season. Hereford manager Josh Gowling said his club had intended to bring Hancox back into the squad in January 2022 but could not do so for financial reasons. He was part of the York team that earned promotion to the National League, playing in their 2–0 win over Boston United on 21 May in the National League North play-off final. Hancox was released by Hereford at the end of the season before signing for York permanently on 23 June on a one-year contract. He was a regular in the side during the 2022–23 season, and his contract was extended for two years in January 2023, but he fell out of favour in 2023–24.

Hancox joined York City's divisional rivals, Hartlepool United on 7 November on loan until January 2024. He made seven National League appearances, scoring once, before returning to York City, who cancelled his contract by mutual consent on 15 March 2024.

=== Later career ===
Later that day, Hancox joined another National League club, Altrincham.

In June 2024, Hancox signed a one-year deal with National League North club Chester. He made 17 appearances in all competitions in the first half of the season, but the travelling time from his home in the north-east of England had become a problem, so he left Chester in January 2025 to join divisional rivals Spennymoor Town. He departed Spennymoor at the end of the 2025–26 season following the expiration of his contract.

== Career statistics ==
As of match played 18 April 2026

Appearances and goals by club, season and competition
Club	Season	League			FA Cup		League Cup		Other		Total	
Club	Season	Division	Apps	Goals	Apps	Goals	Apps	Goals	Apps	Goals	Apps	Goals
Birmingham City	2011–12	Championship	0	0	0	0	0	0	0	0	0	0
Birmingham City	2012–13	Championship	19	0	1	0	0	0	—		20	0
Birmingham City	2013–14	Championship	14	0	2	0	2	0	—		18	0
Birmingham City	2014–15	Championship	0	0	1	0	0	0	—		1	0
Birmingham City	2015–16	Championship	0	0	0	0	1	0	—		1	0
Birmingham City	Total		33	0	4	0	3	0	0	0	40	0
Crawley Town (loan)	2015–16	League Two	15	2	0	0	—		1 (Note: Appearance in Football League Trophy)	0	16	2
Macclesfield Town	2016–17	National League	38	6	3	0	—		8 (Note: Appearance(s) in FA Trophy)	0	49	6
Macclesfield Town	2017–18	National League	39	7	1	0	—		1	0	41	7
Macclesfield Town	Total		77	13	4	0	—		9	0	90	13
Milton Keynes Dons	2018–19	League Two	1	0	0	0	1	0	3 (Note: Appearances in EFL Trophy)	1	5	1
Solihull Moors	2019–20	National League	19	1	0	0	—		2 (Note: Appearances in Scottish Challenge Cup)	0	21	1
Solihull Moors	2020–21	National League	20	0	3	0	—		2	1	25	1
Solihull Moors	Total		39	1	3	0	—		4	1	46	2
Harrogate Town (loan)	2019–20	National League	5	0	—		—		1	0	6	0
Hereford	2021–22	National League North	7	0	2	0	—		0	0	9	0
York City (loan)	2021–22	National League North	28	8	—		—		9 (Note: Six appearances and two goals in FA Trophy, three appearances and one goal in National League North play-offs)	3	37	11
York City	2022–23	National League	37	2	2	1	—		4	0	43	3
York City	2023–24	National League	3	0	0	0	—		0	0	3	0
York City	Total		40	2	2	1	—		4	0	46	3
Hartlepool United (loan)	2023–24	National League	7	1	—		—		0	0	7	1
Altrincham	2023–24	National League	7	0	—		—		1 (Note: Appearance in National League play-offs)	0	8	0
Chester	2024–25	National League North	15	0	1	0	—		1	0	17	0
Spennymoor Town	2024–25	National League North	12	0	—		—		—		12	0
Spennymoor Town	2025–26	National League North	20	1	—		—		—		20	1
Spennymoor Town	Total		32	1	0	0	—		0	0	32	1
Morpeth Town (loan)	2025–26	NPL Premier Division	6	1	—		—		—		6	1
Career total			312	29	16	1	4	0	33	5	365	35

== Honours ==
Macclesfield Town

- National League: 2017–18
- FA Trophy runner-up: 2016–17

York City

- National League North play-offs: 2022
