= Matthew Croucher =

Recipient of the George Cross

Matthew Croucher GC VR
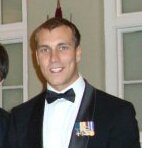
- Croucher in 2010
- Born: 14 December 1983 (age 42); Solihull, England
- Military career
- Allegiance: United Kingdom
- Branch: Royal Marines
- Service years: 2000–present
- Rank: Lance Corporal
- Unit: 40 Commando
- Conflicts: War in Afghanistan; Iraq War
- Awards: George Cross; Volunteer Reserves Service Medal

Matthew Croucher, GC, VR (born 14 December 1983) is a member of the Royal Marines Reserve and a recipient of the George Cross, the highest British and Commonwealth medal for gallantry not in the face of the enemy, for his extreme valour in risking his life to safeguard the lives of his comrades. The award was announced by the Ministry of Defence on 23 July 2008, and gazetted on 24 July 2008, with a lengthy citation.

== Early life ==
Croucher was born in Solihull in the West Midlands in 1983 and attended Lyndon School.

== Military career ==
Prior to joining the Royal Marines in November 2000, he was a member of 2030 (Elmdon & Yardley) Squadron Air Training Corps. He served three tours in Iraq and one tour in Afghanistan. He was a member of 40 Commando from 2002 to 2005 and again from 2007 to 2008. The unit is based at Taunton in Somerset, and served in the Commando Reconnaissance Force. Before his Reserve Service, he was a member of the regular Corps of the Royal Marines.

On 9 November 2007 Croucher was credited with helping to save the life of a seriously wounded comrade who had been shot in the chest. Due to the intensity of the firefight, the company medical assistant was pinned down and could not help for over 20 minutes, during which time Croucher stabilised the casualty until he could be evacuated. Croucher himself was injured in a road accident during an operation the following week, and had to be returned to the United Kingdom for treatment on a suspected broken leg. After intensive physical therapy, he returned to Afghanistan in a matter of weeks to resume his duties.

=== George Cross ===
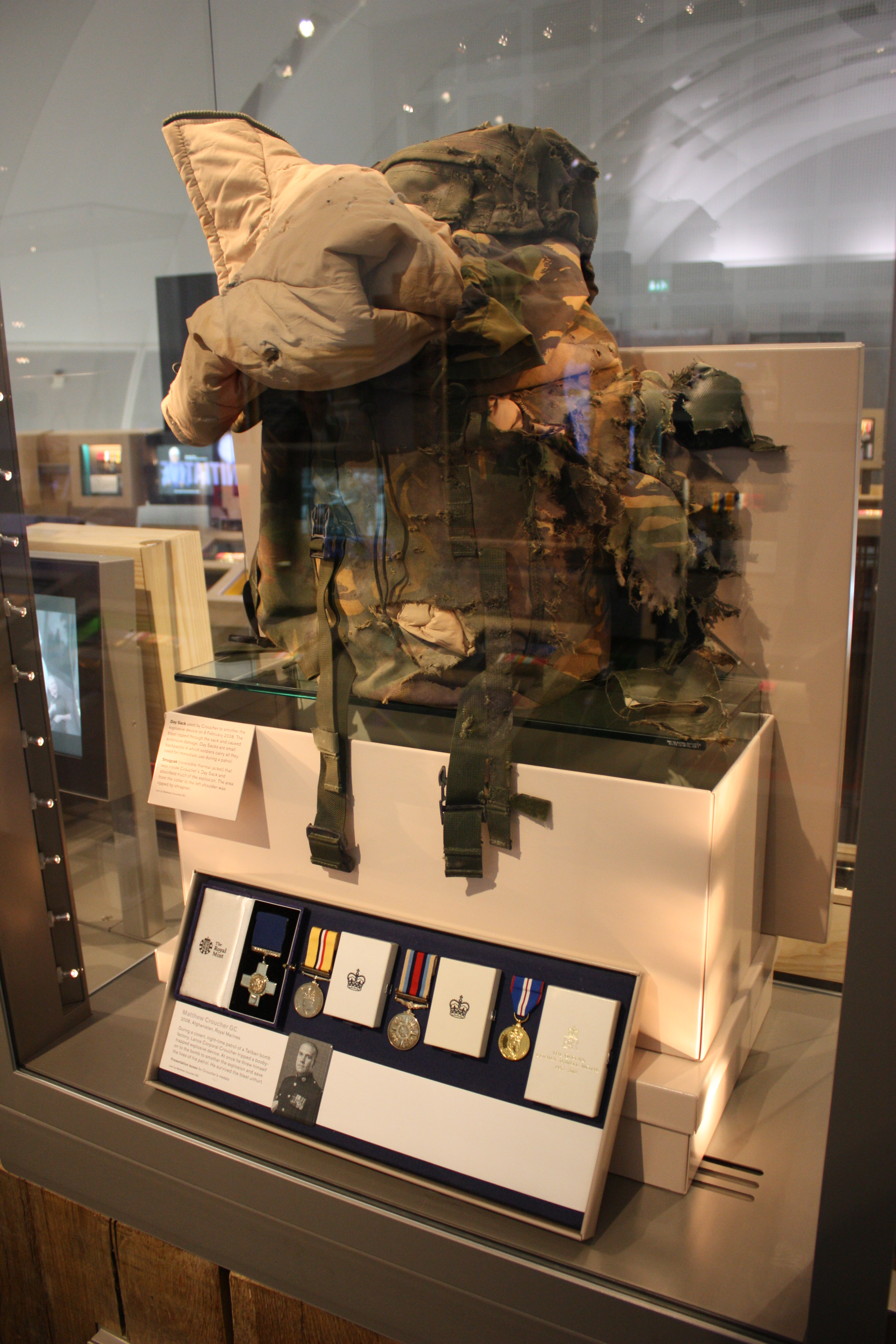
The damaged backpack worn by Croucher along with some of his medals

Croucher was recommended for the award for throwing himself on a Taliban tripwire grenade to save his comrades. He was part of a reconnaissance mission near Sangin in Helmand Province in Afghanistan on 9 February 2008. Moving through a compound at night he felt a trip-wire against his leg and saw that he had activated a grenade. He threw himself to the ground, and used his rucksack to pin the grenade to the floor, and tucked his legs up to his body. He was thrown some distance by the explosion, but due to the protection offered by his rucksack and body-armour, suffered only a nose-bleed, perforated ear drums and some disorientation. The pack was ripped from his back by the explosion, and his body armour and helmet were pitted by grenade fragments. Of the other three members of his patrol, the rear man managed to take cover by retreating round the corner of a building; the patrol commander threw himself to ground, and received a superficial face wound from a grenade fragment; and the final team member did not have time to react, and remained on his feet, and would have been within the lethal range of the grenade but for Croucher's action. The explosion breached a large lithium battery which was in Croucher's pack to power the patrol's electronic countermeasures equipment, causing it to burst into flames. A medic recommended that he be evacuated, but he insisted on continuing as the members of the patrol realised that Taliban fighters would probably come to investigate the explosion, and this would give the marines the opportunity to ambush them; the ambush was successful, and Croucher himself killed a Taliban fighter.

Croucher was initially put forward for the Victoria Cross (VC), the highest decoration for valour in the British Armed Forces. Had he been awarded the Victoria Cross he would have been the first Royal Marine to receive the award since 1945 and only the second living British recipient in the 21st century. The George Cross (GC) is awarded for the same level of bravery expected of a VC but is awarded when no enemy is present. Croucher is one of only 11 living recipients of the medal, of which only 406 have been awarded.

Croucher was presented with the George Cross by Queen Elizabeth II at a ceremony in Buckingham Palace on 30 October 2008.

== Civilian career ==
Croucher is employed in the private security industry by the United Kingdom offices of Pinnacle Risk Management as Managing & Operations Director. He also works out of the offices in Dubai, United Arab Emirates.

On 4 November 2023, Croucher was arrested in Dubai for spying and charged with "intentionally and illegally accessing a telecommunications network". Having initially been held in jail for four days, he was released under investigation; he had passport and phone confiscated, and was banned from leaving the United Arab Emirates. Within days of the June 2024 media coverage of his arrest, the case was dismissed as the "evidence was found to be inadequate" and he was free to leave the UAE.

Croucher received the Freedom of the Borough of Solihull on 16 December 2008.

== Works ==
- Bulletproof, Century, 24 September 2009, ISBN 978-1-84605-704-5.
- Flash Point, Arrow Books, 2010, ISBN 978-0-09-954313-8
- 90 Years of Heroes, Royal British Legion 90th Anniversary tribute, HarperCollins, 2011
