= Shaun Timmins (footballer) =

Association football player (born 1991)

Personal information
- Date of birth: 13 March 1991 (age 35)
- Place of birth: England
- Position: Left-back

Team information
- Current team: St Albans Saints
- Number: 5

Youth career
- –2007: Coventry City
- 2007–2010: Birmingham City

Senior career*
Years	Team	Apps	(Gls)
2010–2011	Redditch United	18	(0)
2011	Sorrento		(2)
2012	ECU Joondalup		(0)
2013	Green Gully	8	(0)
2014	Team Wellington	4	(0)
2014	Wellington Phoenix	3	(0)
2014	Green Gully	0	(0)
2014	South Melbourne	10	(1)
2015–2016	Hume City	29	(3)
2016–2017	Floreat Athena	19	(1)
2017–2018	Melbourne Knights	31	(1)
2019	Moreland Zebras	22	(0)
2021	Green Gully	18	(0)
2022	Dandenong City	12	(0)
2023–	St Albans Saints	0	(0)

International career^{‡}
	Ireland U17	2	(0)
2010	Ireland U19	1	(0)
- * Club domestic league appearances and goals as of 5 May 2022 ‡ National team caps and goals as of 5 August 2014

Shaun Timmins (born 13 March 1991) is a footballer who plays as a left back for St Albans Saints in the NPL Victoria in Australia. He has also played for Redditch United, Team Wellington, Wellington Phoenix as well as a number of teams in the state leagues of Australia.

Born in England, Timmins has also represented the Republic of Ireland national team at youth level.

== Club career ==
Born in England, Timmins grew up in Sheldon, West Midlands. He began his career with the youth team at Coventry City, before moving to the academy of Birmingham City in 2007. Timmins signed his first professional contract with Birmingham in 2009, ahead of the 2009–10 season, however he was released from the club at the end of the season without making a first-team appearance.

Following his release from Birmingham in 2010, Timmins had a trial at Sheffield United, before joining Redditch United in the Football Conference. He made 20 appearances in all competitions for Redditch in the 2010–11 season, which saw the club relegated to the Conference South. At the end of the season, Timmins moved abroad to play in the state league of Western Australia. During his time in the Football West State League, Timmins played first for Sorrento FC, and subsequently ECU Joondalup. He then moved to Victoria in 2013, to play for Green Gully SC in the Victorian Premier League, with the intention of playing in a league at a higher standard.

While playing for Green Gully, Timmins's team-mate Rodrigo Vargas, a former A-League veteran, contacted his former manager at Melbourne Victory and the incumbent Wellington Phoenix manager Ernie Merrick, to inform Merrick of Timmins's impressive performances in the VPL. As a result, Timmins began training with Wellington Phoenix in 2014, however could not play for the side as they had no remaining visa positions. Merrick arranged for Timmins to play for Team Wellington temporarily, and made four appearances for the New Zealand Football Championship side before he was required to play for Wellington Phoenix as an injury replacement player, after an injury to Reece Caira. His signing for Wellington Phoenix until the end of the 2013–14 season was announced on 6 March 2014, and he made his debut for the side three days later, coming off the bench in the first half of a 1–1 draw against Perth Glory on 9 March 2014. Merrick was pleased with Timmins's A-League debut, saying of his performance: "He hasn't trained a lot since the Premier League finished in Melbourne last year, so considering he's five or six months without playing much football he did a really good job. Very happy with him."

At the end of June 2014, Timmins signed for South Melbourne.

== International career ==
Eligible through his father, Timmins has represented the Republic of Ireland national team at youth level. He was selected in the squad for the elite qualification stage of the 2010 UEFA European Under-19 Championship.

== Personal life ==
Timmins supported his future club Birmingham City as a boy and he attended Lyndon School from 2002 to 2007.

During his time playing for Green Gully, Timmins worked on construction sites in Melbourne.
