= Gwion Edwards =

Welsh footballer (born 1993)

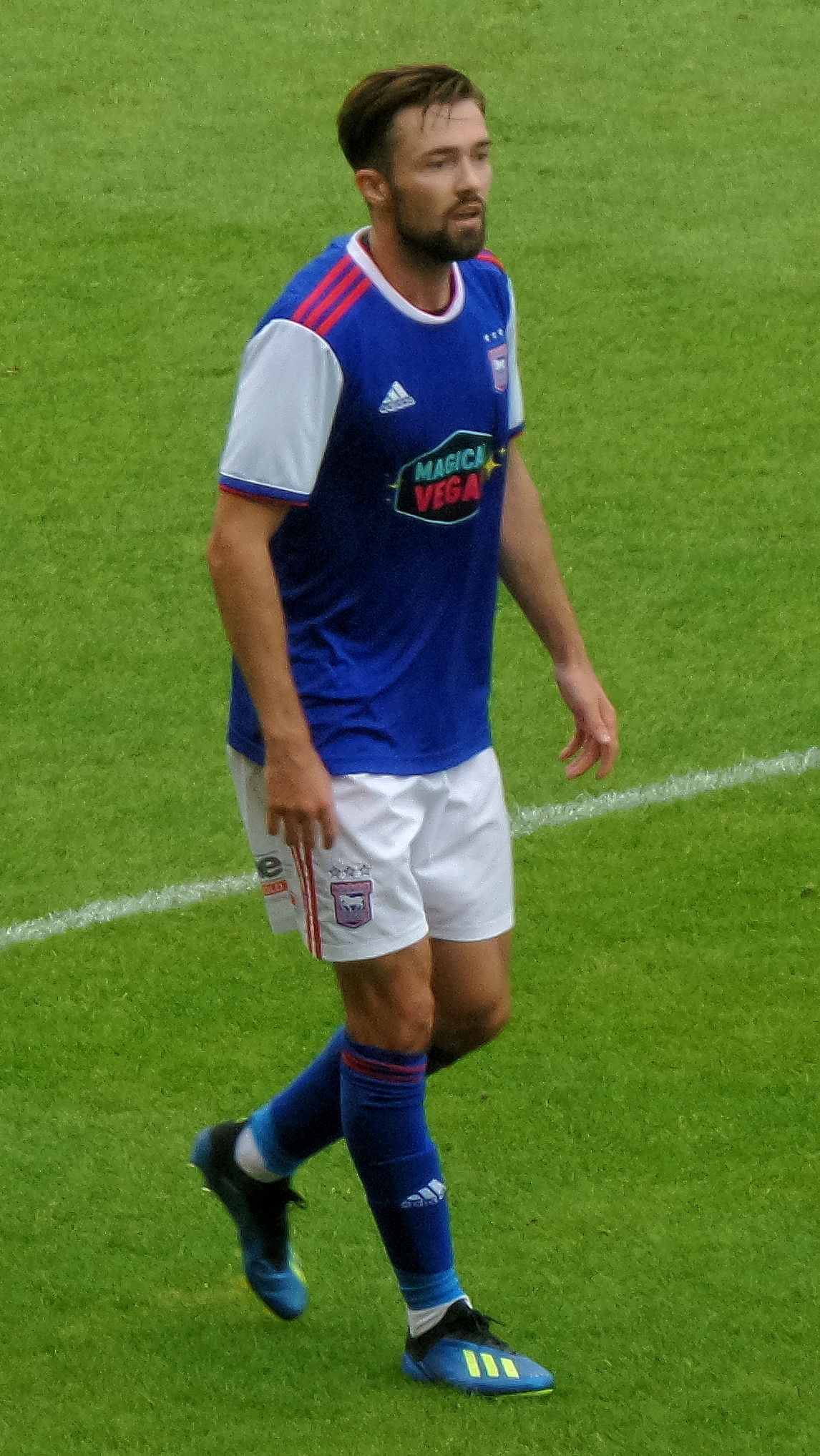
- Edwards playing for Ipswich Town in 2018

Personal information
- Full name: Gwion Dafydd Rhys Edwards
- Date of birth: 1 March 1993 (age 33)
- Place of birth: Lampeter, Wales
- Height: 5 ft 9 in (1.75 m)
- Position: Winger

Team information
- Current team: Exeter City
- Number: 7

Youth career
- 2004–2007: Aberystwyth Town
- 2007–2011: Swansea City

Senior career*
Years	Team	Apps	(Gls)
2011–2014	Swansea City	0	(0)
2013	→ St Johnstone (loan)	6	(0)
2013–2014	→ St Johnstone (loan)	13	(0)
2014	→ Crawley Town (loan)	6	(2)
2014–2016	Crawley Town	79	(12)
2016–2018	Peterborough United	59	(11)
2018–2021	Ipswich Town	95	(14)
2021–2023	Wigan Athletic	32	(1)
2023	→ Ross County (loan)	5	(0)
2024–2026	Morecambe	80	(12)
2026–	Exeter City	0	(0)

International career^{‡}
2011	Wales U19	2	(0)
2012–2014	Wales U21	6	(1)
- * Club domestic league appearances and goals as of 26 October 2025 (UTC) ‡ National team caps and goals as of 11:59, 16 March 2019 (UTC)

Gwion Dafydd Rhys Edwards (born 1 March 1993) is a Welsh professional footballer who plays as a winger for EFL League Two club Exeter City. He is a former Wales Under-21 international.

Edwards joined the Swansea City academy in 2007, having previously spent three years at Aberystwyth Town. He spent seven years at Swansea, having graduated from the club's academy. During his time at Swansea he spent two spells out on loan at Scottish side St Johnstone and one with English side Crawley Town, before joining the later permanently in 2014. He spent two years at Crawley before joining Peterborough United in 2016, where he spent two seasons. In 2018, Edwards signed for Ipswich Town.

He has represented Wales at youth level, winning caps at U19 and U21 levels. He has been called up to the senior Wales squad in 2014 and 2018.

== Club career ==
=== Swansea City ===
After spells with clubs including Aberystwyth Town and Cardiff City, Edwards joined Swansea City Football Club as an U15. Rising up through the Swansea youth system, Edwards signed his first professional contract, a 3-year deal, with Swansea City after a successful 2010–11 season. He went on to help Swansea win the FAW Welsh Youth Cup and was a permanent fixture in Swansea Reserve team, winning Reserve Team Player of the Year in 2011–12.

On 9 May 2012, Edwards signed a new three-year contract with Swansea, keeping him at the club until June 2015. He featured on the bench for the first team on 13 May 2012, in a 1–0 win over Liverpool at the Liberty Stadium. He was called by Swansea manager Brendan Rodgers to be subbed on during stoppage time but did not make it onto the field due to the ball not going out of play before the final whistle.

==== St Johnstone (loans) ====
On 31 January 2013, Edwards moved to Scottish Premier League side St Johnstone on loan for the remainder of the 2012–13 season. He made his professional debut by coming off the bench in the 72nd minute in a 2–0 defeat to St Mirren in the Scottish Cup. Edwards made his SPL debut by coming off the bench in a 1–1 draw with Celtic on 19 February.

Edwards made a return to St Johnstone in July 2013, joining on loan until January 2014. Edwards made his Europa League debut in St Johnstone's 1–0 victory away vs Rosenborg on 18 July 2013 coming on in the 66th minute. In the third round of the second leg of the Europa League against Minsk, Edwards was among two players to see their penalty successfully converted, which Minsk won, eliminating St Johnstone from the competition. Edwards then scored his first professional goal in a 3–0 win for St Johnstone against Hamilton Academical in the Scottish League Cup.

By the end of his second loan spell with St Johnstone, Edwards had made a total of 24 appearances in all competitions, scoring 1 goal.

=== Crawley Town ===
On 27 March 2014, Edwards joined League One side Crawley Town on a one-month loan. On 15 April 2014, Edwards enjoyed a goalscoring-debut for Crawley as a 76th-minute substitute in their 2–0 win against Tranmere Rovers. In his second appearance, Edwards scored again for Crawley in their 2–1 victory against Leyton Orient. After impressing Crawley manager John Gregory, Edwards' loan was extended to the end of the 2013–14 season.

On 11 July 2014, Edwards signed for Crawley Town on a two-year contract for an undisclosed fee. Edwards' first game after signing for the club on a permanent basis came in the opening game of the season, as Crawley Town beat Barnsley 1–0. He went on to make 93 appearances in all competitions over three seasons at the Broadfield Stadium, scoring 15 goals.

=== Peterborough United ===
On 24 June 2016, Edwards joined League One side Peterborough United on a three-year deal for an undisclosed fee. He scored the winner on his debut in a 3–2 win over Rochdale on 6 August 2016. He won the club's goal of the season award for the 2016–17 season for an individual effort in a 2–0 win over Charlton Athletic on 17 December. Edwards made 74 appearances for Peterborough during two seasons at the club, scoring 16 goals,

=== Ipswich Town ===
On 17 July 2018, he signed a two-year deal (plus an option for a further year) with Ipswich Town, for a reported fee of £700,000. Edwards scored his first goal for the club on his debut in a 2–2 draw with Blackburn Rovers at Portman Road, on the opening day of the season. Edwards went on to score 6 goals in 34 appearances in his debut season at Portman Road, including scoring in the East Anglian Derby at Portman Road on 2 September 2018.

He scored his first goal of the 2019–20 season on 24 August, netting the second goal in a 0–5 away win against Bolton Wanderers at the University of Bolton Stadium. He featured regularly throughout the season, often filling in at right wing-back and right-back due to an injury to Kane Vincent-Young. On 18 May 2020, Ipswich took up the one-year option in his contract, extending his stay at the club until 2021.

Edwards scored in the opening game of the 2020–21 season, scoring the second goal in a 2–0 home win over Wigan Athletic. He continued his goal scoring form throughout September and October, scoring 5 goals in the opening 6 games of the season, including a brace in a 4–1 away win over Blackpool on 10 October. With his contract set to expire at the end of the season, Ipswich reportedly entered negotiations to extend Edwards's deal, but were unable to come to an agreement and he left the club.

=== Wigan Athletic ===
On 10 June 2021, Edwards completed a move to Wigan Athletic, signing a two-year deal with the club. He scored on his debut for Wigan in a 2–1 defeat at Sunderland on 7 August 2021.

Edwards was loaned to Scottish club Ross County in January 2023.

He was released by Wigan at the end of the 2022–23 season.

=== Morecambe ===
On 3 January 2024, Edwards signed for Morecambe on a contract until the end of the 2023-2024 season.

On 17 May 2024, Edwards signed a new two-year deal with the option for a further year.

=== Exeter City ===
On 9 June 2026, Edwards signed for Exeter City on a one year deal, with the option of a further year, until the end of the 26/27 League Two season.

== International career ==
Edwards has won 2 caps for the Wales under-19 team, featuring in matches against Scotland and Slovenia in 2011. In September 2012, he made his Wales under-21 debut in a 5–0 defeat by the Czech Republic. He scored his first international goal for the Wales under-21 team on 19 May 2014, in a 3–1 loss to England at the Liberty Stadium. Edwards won 6 caps for Wales' under-21 side between 2012 and 2014, scoring 1 goal.

He received his first senior international call up in October 2014, being called into the Wales senior squad for the Euro-2016 qualifying matches versus Bosnia and Herzegovina and Cyprus. He was an unused substitute in both matches. On 12 October 2018, Edwards was called up by Wales manager Ryan Giggs for the squad to face the Republic of Ireland in the 2018–19 UEFA Nations League four days later. He was an unused substitute as Wales emerged 1–0 winners in Dublin.

== Career statistics ==
As of end of 2024–25 season

Appearances and goals by club, season and competition
Club	Season	League			National Cup		League Cup		Europe		Other		Total	
Club	Season	Division	Apps	Goals	Apps	Goals	Apps	Goals	Apps	Goals	Apps	Goals	Apps	Goals
Swansea City	2011–12	Premier League	0	0	0	0	0	0	—		—		0	0
Swansea City	2012–13	Premier League	0	0	0	0	0	0	—		—		0	0
Swansea City	2013–14	Premier League	0	0	0	0	0	0	0	0	—		0	0
Swansea City	Total		0	0	0	0	0	0	0	0	0	0	0	0
St Johnstone (loan)	2012–13	Scottish Premier League	6	0	1	0	0	0	0	0	—		7	0
St Johnstone (loan)	2013–14	Scottish Premiership	13	0	0	0	1	1	3 (Note: Appearances in UEFA Europa League)	0	—		17	1
St Johnstone (loan)	Total		19	0	1	0	1	1	3	0	0	0	24	1
Crawley Town (loan)	2013–14	League One	6	2	0	0	0	0	—		0	0	6	2
Crawley Town	2014–15	League One	37	4	1	0	2	0	—		2 (Note: Appearance(s) in Football League Trophy)	1	42	5
Crawley Town	2015–16	League Two	42	8	1	0	1	0	—		1	0	45	8
Crawley Town	Total		85	14	2	0	3	0	0	0	3	1	93	15
Peterborough United	2016–17	League One	33	7	4	2	2	0	—		2 (Note: Appearance(s) in EFL Trophy)	0	41	9
Peterborough United	2017–18	League One	26	4	3	1	1	1	—		3	1	33	7
Peterborough United	Total		59	11	7	3	3	1	0	0	5	1	74	16
Ipswich Town	2018–19	Championship	33	6	1	0	0	0	—		—		33	6
Ipswich Town	2019–20	League One	27	2	3	0	1	0	—		4	0	35	2
Ipswich Town	2020–21	League One	36	6	1	0	2	0	—		1	0	40	6
Ipswich Town	Total		96	14	5	0	3	0	0	0	5	0	108	14
Wigan Athletic	2021–22	League One	30	1	5	0	2	0	—		6	2	43	3
Wigan Athletic	2022–23	Championship	2	0	0	0	0	0	—		—		2	0
Wigan Athletic	Total		32	1	5	0	2	0	0	0	6	2	45	3
Ross County (loan)	2022–23	Scottish Premiership	5	0	0	0	0	0	—		—		5	0
Morecambe	2023–24	League Two	21	3	1	0	0	0	—		0	0	22	3
Morecambe	2024–25	League Two	25	3	1	0	1	0	—		1	0	28	3
Morecambe	2025–26	National League	13	3	0	0	0	0	—		—		0	0
Morecambe	Career total		353	49	22	3	13	2	3	0	20	4	400	55

== Honours ==
Wigan Athletic

- EFL League One: 2021–22

Individual

- Peterborough United Goal of the Season: 2016–17
