= 2013–14 Crawley Town F.C. season =

Crawley Town
2013–14 season
- Chairman: Dave Pottinger
- Manager: Richie Barker (until 27 November); John Gregory
- League One: 14th
- FA Cup: Second round replay (eliminated by Bristol Rovers)
- League Cup: First round (eliminated by Cheltenham Town)
- Football League Trophy: Second round (eliminated by Newport County)
| colours | Away colours | Third colours |

The 2013–14 season was the 64th season in which Crawley Town played senior football, and the eight as a fully professional team. Crawley Town competed in Football League One for the second consecutive season, the third tier of English football, following automatic promotion from League Two during the 2011–12 season. They finished 14th in League One, and also competed in the FA Cup, Football League Cup and Football League Trophy, where they were eliminated in the second round, first round and second round respectively.

== First-team squad ==
As of 5 May 2014
Players' ages are as of 1 August 2013.

| No. | Nat | Name | Date of birth (Age) | Place of birth | Signed from | Note |
Goalkeepers
| 1 | ENG | Paul Jones | 28 June 1986 (aged 27) | Maidstone | Peterborough United | |
| 25 | ENG | Jonny Maddison | 4 September 1994 (aged 18) | Chester-le-Street | Sunderland | |
| 32 | ENG | Ross Atkins | 3 November 1989 (aged 23) | Derby | on loan from Derby County | |
Defenders
| 2 | ENG | James Hurst | 31 January 1992 (aged 21) | Sutton Coldfield | Valur | |
| 3 | ENG | Mat Sadler | 26 February 1985 (aged 28) | Birmingham | Walsall | |
| 4 | IRL | Mark Connolly | 16 December 1991 (aged 21) | Monaghan | Bolton Wanderers | |
| 5 | ENG | Kyle McFadzean | 20 February 1987 (aged 26) | Sheffield | Alfreton Town | |
| 6 | ENG | Connor Essam | 9 July 1992 (aged 21) | Sheerness | Gillingham | |
| 12 | WAL | Joe Walsh | 13 May 1992 (aged 21) | Cardiff | Swansea City | |
| 22 | ENG | Louis John | 19 April 1994 (aged 19) | Croydon | none | |
| 24 | ENG | Alex Malins | 10 November 1994 (aged 18) | Horsham | none | |
| 29 | ENG | Paul Connolly | 29 September 1983 (aged 29) | Liverpool | Millwall | |
Midfielders
| 8 | ARG | Sergio Torres | 11 July 1981 (aged 32) | Mar del Plata | Peterborough United | |
| 10 | ENG | Andy Drury | 28 November 1983 (aged 29) | Sittingbourne | Ipswich Town | |
| 11 | ENG | Josh Simpson | 6 March 1987 (aged 26) | Harlow | Peterborough United | |
| 15 | ENG | Dannie Bulman | 24 January 1979 (aged 34) | Ashford | Oxford United | |
| 16 | WAL | Nicky Adams | 16 October 1986 (aged 26) | Bolton | Rochdale | |
| 17 | ENG | Hiram Boateng | 8 January 1996 (aged 17) | Wandsworth | on loan from Crystal Palace | |
| 18 | ENG | Luke Rooney | 28 December 1990 (aged 22) | Bermondsey | on loan from Swindon Town | |
| 19 | ENG | Jeffrey Monakana | 5 November 1993 (aged 19) | Edmonton | on loan from Brighton & Hove Albion | |
| 21 | ENG | Mike Jones | 15 August 1987 (aged 25) | Birkenhead | Sheffield Wednesday | |
| 26 | WAL | Gwion Edwards | 1 March 1993 (aged 20) | Lampeter | on loan from Swansea City | |
| 28 | IRL | Gary Dicker | 31 July 1986 (aged 27) | Dublin | Rochdale | |
| 32 | ENG | Kyle Bennett | 9 September 1990 (aged 22) | Telford | on loan from Doncaster Rovers | |
| 33 | ENG | Bradley Isaacs | 2 December 1995 (aged 17) | Crawley | none | |
| 34 | ENG | Ryan Richefond | 16 June 1996 (aged 17) | Tower Hamlets | none | |
Forwards
| 7 | IRL | Billy Clarke | 13 December 1987 (aged 25) | Cork | Blackpool | |
| 9 | ENG | Gary Alexander | 15 August 1979 (aged 33) | Lambeth | Brentford | |
| 9 | NZL | Rory Fallon | 20 March 1982 (aged 31) | Gisbourne | St Johnstone | |
| 14 | ENG | Jamie Proctor | 25 March 1992 (aged 21) | Preston | Swansea City | |
| 16 | ENG | Sullay Kaikai | 26 August 1995 (aged 17) | Southwark | on loan from Crystal Palace | |
| 18 | ENG | Matt Tubbs | 15 July 1984 (aged 29) | Salisbury | on loan from A.F.C. Bournemouth | |
| 20 | ENG | Emile Sinclair | 29 December 1987 (aged 25) | Leeds | Peterborough United | |
| 23 | BER | Jonté Smith | 10 July 1994 (aged 19) | Hamilton | Sutton United | |

== Competitions ==
=== Pre-season ===
Friendly match details
| Date | Time | Opponent | Venue | Result F–A | Scorers | Attendance | Ref. |
|---|---|---|---|---|---|---|---|
| 5 July 2013 | 19:45 | Oakwood | A | 8–1 | Alexander, Adekunle, Drury, Connolly, Smith, Proctor, Hurst, Bulman | 300 | |
| 10 July 2013 | 19:45 | Ipswich Town | H | 1–2 | Adams 63' | 1,029 | |
| 13 July 2013 | 15:00 | Millwall | H | 0–2 | | 1,391 | |
| 17 July 2013 | 19:45 | Whitehawk | A | 0–0 | | 250 | |
| 20 July 2013 | 15:00 | Burgess Hill Town | A | 5–0 | | 341 | |
| 24 July 2013 | 19:45 | Brighton & Hove Albion | H | 0–2 | | 2,355 | |
| 27 July 2013 | 15:00 | Crystal Palace | H | 3–0 | Clarke 28', Torres 74', Sadler 88' | 3,109 | |
| 31 July 2013 | 19:45 | Three Bridges | A | 1–0 | | 300 | |

=== League One ===
==== League table ====
| Pos | Team | Pld | W | D | L | GF | GA | GD | Pts |
|---|---|---|---|---|---|---|---|---|---|
| 12 | Bristol City | 46 | 13 | 19 | 14 | 70 | 67 | +3 | 58 |
| 13 | Walsall | 46 | 14 | 16 | 16 | 49 | 49 | 0 | 58 |
| 14 | Crawley Town | 46 | 14 | 15 | 17 | 48 | 54 | −6 | 57 |
| 15 | Oldham Athletic | 46 | 14 | 14 | 18 | 50 | 59 | −9 | 56 |
| 16 | Colchester United | 46 | 13 | 14 | 19 | 53 | 61 | −8 | 53 |

Updated to match(es) played on 3 May 2014. Source: BBC Sport
Rules for classification: 1) Points; 2) Goal difference; 3) Number of goals scored

==== Matches ====
| 3 August 2013 1 | Crawley Town | 3–2 | Coventry City | Crawley |
| 15:00 BST | Proctor 13'; Walsh 21'; Jones 84' | Report | Wilson 61'; Moussa 82' | Stadium: Broadfield Stadium; Attendance: 3,454; Referee: Lee Collins |

| 10 August 2013 2 | Tranmere Rovers | 3–3 | Crawley Town | Birkenhead |
| 15:00 BST | Thompson 16', 44'; Lowe 90' | Report | Walsh 10', 81'; Clarke 55' | Stadium: Prenton Park; Attendance: 4,763; Referee: Keith Hill |

| 17 August 2013 3 | Crawley Town | 1–2 | Rotherham United | Crawley |
| 15:00 BST | Sadler 15' | Report | Agard 36'; Worrall 76' | Stadium: Broadfield Stadium; Attendance: 3,110; Referee: James Linington |

| 23 August 2013 4 | Wolverhampton Wanderers | 2–1 | Crawley Town | Wolverhampton |
| 19:45 BST | Sigurðarson 7'; Griffiths 90' (pen.) | Report | Clarke 90' | Stadium: Molineux; Attendance: 17,406; Referee: Simon Hooper |

| 31 August 2013 5 | Peterborough United | 0–2 | Crawley Town | Peterborough |
| 15:00 BST | | Report | Alexander 22', 65' | Stadium: London Road; Attendance: 6,761; Referee: Darren Bond |

| 7 September 2013 6 | Crawley Town | 3–2 | Gillingham | Crawley |
| 15:00 BST | McFadzean 55'; Clarke 66', 81' | Report | Danny Kedwell 47' (pen.); Legge 69' | Stadium: Broadfield Stadium; Attendance: 3,984; Referee: Steven Rushton |

| 14 September 2013 7 | Crawley Town | 1–1 | Shrewsbury Town | Crawley |
| 15:00 BST | Drury 64' | Report | Wildig 47' | Stadium: Broadfield Stadium; Attendance: 3,202; Referee: Gavin Ward |

| 21 September 2013 8 | Colchester United | 1–1 | Crawley Town | Colchester |
| 15:00 BST | Sears 6' | Report | Sinclair 32' | Stadium: Colchester Community Stadium; Attendance: 3,031; Referee: Keith Stroud |

| 28 September 2013 9 | Crawley Town | 1–0 | Oldham Athletic | Crawley |
| 15:00 BST | Walsh 7' | Report | | Stadium: Broadfield Stadium; Attendance: 3,142; Referee: Andy Davies |

| 4 October 2013 10 | Sheffield United | 1–1 | Crawley Town | Sheffield |
| 19:45 BST | King 63' | Report | Proctor 10' | Stadium: Bramall Lane; Attendance: 15,401; Referee: Paul Tierney |

| 19 October 2013 11 | Crawley Town | 1–0 | Bradford City | Crawley |
| 15:00 BST | Sinclair 54' | Report | | Stadium: Broadfield Stadium; Attendance: 3,836; Referee: Dean Whitestone |

| 22 October 2013 12 | Crawley Town | 0–3 | Port Vale | Crawley |
| 19:45 BST | | Report | Dodds 10'; Loft 27'; Williamson 57' | Stadium: Broadfield Stadium; Attendance: 2,748; Referee: Fred Graham |

| 26 October 2013 13 | Stevenage | 2–0 | Crawley Town | Stevenage |
| 15:00 BST | Hartley 8'; Doughty 90+1' | Report | | Stadium: Broadhall Way; Attendance: 2,804; Referee: Richard Clark |

| 2 November 2013 14 | Crawley Town | 0–1 | Brentford | Crawley |
| 15:00 GMT | | Report | Forshaw 5' (pen.) | Stadium: Broadfield Stadium; Attendance: 4,177; Referee: Graham Scott |

| 5 November 2013 15 | Bristol City | 2–0 | Crawley Town | Bristol |
| 19:45 GMT | Emmanuel-Thomas 80'; Bryan 87' | Report | | Stadium: Ashton Gate; Attendance: 10,085; Referee: Brendan Malone |

| 16 November 2013 16 | Carlisle United | 1–1 | Crawley Town | Carlisle |
| 15:00 GMT | Noble 47' (pen.) | Report | Clarke 88' | Stadium: Brunton Park; Attendance: 3,675; Referee: Tony Harrington |

| 23 November 2013 17 | Crawley Town | 0–0 | Walsall | Crawley |
| 15:00 GMT | | Report | | Stadium: Broadfield Stadium; Attendance: 3,296; Referee: Tim Robinson |

| 26 November 2013 18 | Crawley Town | 0–0 | Swindon Town | Crawley |
| 19:45 GMT | McFadzean (yellow card) 57' | Report | Kasim (yellow card) 45'; Nathan Byrne (yellow card) 76' (yellow-red card) 87' | Stadium: Broadfield Stadium; Attendance: 2,868; Referee: Andy D'Urso |

| 30 November 2013 19 | Crewe Alexandra | 1–0 | Crawley Town | Crewe |
| 15:00 GMT | Oliver (yellow card) 46' (yellow-red card) 55'; Aneke 81' | Report | Connolly (yellow card) 77'; Hurst (yellow card) 84' | Stadium: Gresty Road; Attendance: 4,001; Referee: James Adcock |

| 14 December 2013 20 | Crawley Town | 2–2 | Preston North End | Crawley |
| 15:00 GMT | Walsh 66'; Alexander 90' | Report | Huntingdon 9'; Brownhill 16'; Humphrey (yellow card) 34'; Welsh (yellow card) 82'; Laird (yellow card) 87' | Stadium: Broadfield Stadium; Attendance: 2,407; Referee: Charles Breakspear |

| 21 December 2013 21 | Leyton Orient | 2–3 | Crawley Town | Leyton, London |
| 15:00 GMT | Odubajo 14'; Lisbie (yellow card) 35'; James (yellow card) 45'; Batt (yellow card) 53'; Bartley 86' | Report | Alexander 36' (yellow card) 37'; Drury 45' (yellow card) 90'; Connolly (yellow card) 68'; Bulman (yellow card) 70'; Adams 76'; Clarke (yellow card) 87' | Stadium: Brisbane Road; Attendance: 4,855; Referee: Trevor Kettle |

| 26 December 2013 22 | Crawley Town | 0–2 | Milton Keynes Dons | Crawley |
| 15:00 GMT | Clarke (red card) | Report | Gleeson 22'; Bamford 59' | Stadium: Broadfield Stadium; Attendance: 3,249; Referee: Seb Stockbridge |

| 29 December 2013 23 | Crawley Town | 1–0 | Notts County | Crawley |
| 15:00 GMT | Connolly 54' | Report | Sheehan (yellow card) 59' (yellow-red card) 79' | Stadium: Broadfield Stadium; Attendance: 3,096; Referee: Mark Brown |

| 12 January 2014 24 | Coventry City | 2–2 | Crawley Town | Northampton |
| 15:00 GMT | Sadler 41' (o.g.); Moussa 85', (yellow card) 77' | Report | Proctor 83'; Drury 87' | Stadium: Sixfields Stadium; Attendance: 2,128; Referee: James Linnington |

| 25 January 2014 25 | Rotherham United | 2–2 | Crawley Town | Rotherham |
| 15:00 GMT | Agard 34' (pen.), 90' | Report | Tubbs 24'; Simpson 65' | Stadium: New York Stadium; Attendance: 7,579; Referee: Michael Bull |

| 22 February 2014 26 | Walsall | 1–2 | Crawley Town | Bescot, Walsall |
| 15:00 GMT | Mantom 64'; Lalkovič (yellow card) 74' | Report | Tubbs 4' (pen.), 51'; McFadzean (yellow card) 19'; Connolly (yellow card) 37'; Clarke (yellow card) 71' (yellow-red card) 80' | Stadium: Bescot Stadium; Attendance: 3,904; Referee: Kevin Wright |

| 25 February 2014 27 | Swindon Town | 1–1 | Crawley Town | Swindon |
| 19:45 GMT | Byrne 49' | Report | Tubbs 80' | Stadium: County Ground; Attendance: 7,062; Referee: Steve Rushton |

| 1 March 2014 28 | Crawley Town | 1–0 | Peterborough United | Crawley |
| 15:00 GMT | Tubbs 86' (pen.) | Report | | Stadium: Broadfield Stadium; Attendance: 3,663; Referee: Lee Collins |

| 4 March 2014 29 | Crawley Town | 1–1 | Stevenage | Crawley |
| 19:45 GMT | Tubbs 90+2' | Report | Dembélé 21'; Ashton (yellow card) 55'; Obeng (yellow card) 62' | Stadium: Broadfield Stadium; Attendance: 2,936; Referee: Iain Williamson |

| 8 March 2014 30 | Gillingham | 1–0 | Crawley Town | Gillingham |
| 15:00 GMT | Lee 88' | Report | | Stadium: Priestfield Stadium; Attendance: 5,961; Referee: Dean Whitestone |

| 11 March 2014 31 | Shrewsbury Town | 1–1 | Crawley Town | Shrewsbury |
| 19:45 GMT | Parry 56' | Report | Simpson 24' | Stadium: New Meadow; Attendance: 4,039; Referee: Paul Tierney |

| 15 March 2014 32 | Crawley Town | 1–0 | Colchester United | Crawley |
| 15:00 GMT | Jones 41' | Report | | Stadium: Broadfield Stadium; Attendance: 3,182; Referee: Chris Sarginson |

| 18 March 2014 33 | Crawley Town | 2–1 | Wolverhampton Wanderers | Crawley |
| 19:45 GMT | Clarke 27'; Tubbs 32' | Report | Henry 25' | Stadium: Broadfield Stadium; Attendance: 5,680; Referee: Carl Berry |

| 22 March 2014 34 | Oldham Athletic | 1–0 | Crawley Town | Oldham |
| 15:00 GMT | Philliskirk 18' | Report | | Stadium: Boundary Park; Attendance: 3,389; Referee: Mark Heywood |

| 25 March 2014 35 | Crawley Town | 0–2 | Sheffield United | Crawley |
| 19:45 GMT | | Report | Coady 19', 63' | Stadium: Broadfield Stadium; Attendance: 3,622; Referee: Graham Horwood |

| 29 March 2014 36 | Preston North End | 1–0 | Crawley Town | Preston |
| 15:00 GMT | Garner 13' | Report | | Stadium: Deepdale; Attendance: 8,979; Referee: David Webb |

| 1 April 2014 37 | Port Vale | 2–1 | Crawley Town | Burslem, Stoke-on-Trent |
| 19:45 BST | Knott 50'; Loft 84' | Report | Clarke 35' (pen.) | Stadium: Vale Park; Attendance: 3,755; Referee: Nigel Miller |

| 5 April 2014 38 | Crawley Town | 1–2 | Crewe Alexandra | Crawley |
| 15:00 BST | Proctor 69' | Report | Ikpeazu 19'; Inman 80' | Stadium: Broadfield Stadium; Attendance: 3,024; Referee: Trevor Kettle |

| 8 April 2014 39 | Brentford | 1–0 | Crawley Town | Brentford, London |
| 19:45 BST | Douglas 58' | Report | | Stadium: Griffin Park; Attendance: 7,718; Referee: Steve Martin |

| 12 April 2014 40 | Milton Keynes Dons | 0–2 | Crawley Town | Milton Keynes |
| 15:00 BST | | Report | Drury 7'; Jones 45+4' | Stadium: Stadium MK; Attendance: 8,877; Referee: Steve Bratt |

| 15 April 2014 41 | Crawley Town | 2–0 | Tranmere Rovers | Crawley |
| 19:45 BST | Tubbs 37'; Jones (yellow card) 64'; Edwards 86'; Sadler (yellow card) 90' | Report | Rowe (yellow card) 90' | Stadium: Broadfield Stadium; Attendance: 3,443; Referee: James Linington |

| 18 April 2014 42 | Crawley Town | 2–1 | Leyton Orient | Crawley |
| 15:00 BST | Edwards 26'; Drury 70' | Report | Dagnall 40' | Stadium: Broadfield Stadium; Attendance: 4,387; Referee: Mick Russell |

| 21 April 2014 43 | Notts County | 1–0 | Crawley Town | Nottingham |
| 15:00 BST | Spencer 34' | Report | | Stadium: Meadow Lane; Attendance: 7,111; Referee: Carl Boyeson |

| 26 April 2014 44 | Bradford City | 2–1 | Crawley Town | Bradford |
| 15:00 BST | McLean 49'; Thompson 85' | Report | Proctor 65' | Stadium: Valley Parade; Attendance: 13,247; Referee: Seb Stockbridge |

| 29 April 2014 45 | Crawley Town | 0–0 | Carlisle United | Crawley |
| 19:45 BST | | Report | | Stadium: Broadfield Stadium; Attendance: 3,271; Referee: Robert Lewis |

| 3 May 2014 46 | Crawley Town | 1–1 | Bristol City | Crawley |
| 15:00 BST | Proctor 26' | Report | Gillett 62' | Stadium: Broadfield Stadium; Attendance: 4,405; Referee: Michael Bull |

=== FA Cup ===
| 9 November 2013 First round | Hednesford Town | 1–2 | Crawley Town | Hednesford |
| 15:00 GMT | Durrell 76' (pen.) | Report | Campion 61' (og.); Sinclair 83' | Stadium: Keys Park; Attendance: 2,231; Referee: Michael Bull |

| 7 December 2013 Second round | Bristol Rovers | 0–0 | Crawley Town | Bristol |
| 15:00 GMT | | Report | | Stadium: Memorial Stadium; Attendance: 4,623; Referee: Chris Sarginson |

| 18 December 2013 Replay | Crawley Town | A–A | Bristol Rovers | Crawley |
| 19:45 GMT | | Report | | Stadium: Broadfield Stadium; Referee: Stuart Attwell |
Note: Match abandoned after 75 minutes

| 4 January 2014 Replay | Crawley Town | P–P | Bristol Rovers | Crawley |
| 15:00 GMT | | Report | | Stadium: Broadfield Stadium; Referee: Andy Davies |
Note: Postponed due to a waterlogged pitch

| 8 January 2014 Replay | Crawley Town | 1–2 | Bristol Rovers | Crawley |
| 19:45 GMT | Proctor 15' | Report | Richards 83'; O'Toole 90+1' | Stadium: Broadfield Stadium; Attendance: 2,435; Referee: Andy Davies |

=== League Cup ===
| 6 August 2013 First round | Cheltenham Town | 4–3 (a.e.t.) | Crawley Town | Cheltenham |
| 19:45 BST | Richards 40'; Gornell 70'; Harrison 75', 114' | Report | Alexander 23'; Adams 59', 65' | Stadium: Whaddon Road; Attendance: 1,562; Referee: Oliver Langford |

=== Football League Trophy ===
| 8 October 2013 Second round | Crawley Town | 2–3 | Newport County | Crawley |
| 19:00 BST | Sinclair 13'; Jones 23' | Report | Zebroski 43'; Chapman 48'; Essam 61' (o.g.) | Stadium: Broadfield Stadium; Attendance: 1,350; Referee: Rob Lewis |

== Transfers ==
=== In ===
| Date | Position | Nationality | Name | From | Fee | Ref. |
|---|---|---|---|---|---|---|
| 1 May 2013 | GK | (England) | Jonny Maddison | Sunderland | Free | |
| 17 June 2013 | MF | (England) | Andy Drury | Ipswich Town | Free | |
| 1 July 2013 | DF | (England) | James Hurst | Valur | Free | |
| 29 August 2013 | FW | (England) | Emile Sinclair | Peterborough United | £100,000 | |
| 23 January 2014 | MF | (Republic of Ireland) | Gary Dicker | Rochdale | Free | |
| 17 February 2014 | FW | (New Zealand) | Rory Fallon | St Johnstone | Free | |
| 18 February 2014 | DF | (England) | Paul Connolly | Millwall | Free | |

=== Out ===
| Date from | Position | Nationality | Name | To | Fee | Ref. |
|---|---|---|---|---|---|---|
| 30 June 2013 | MF | (England) | Matt Sparrow | Scunthorpe United | Released | (Note: Sparrow joined Scunthorpe United after his release.) |
| 30 June 2013 | DF | (Sierra Leone) | Mustapha Dumbuya | Notts County | Released | (Note: Dumbuya joined Notts County after his release.) |
| 30 June 2013 | FW | (England) | Lateef Elford-Alliyu | Tamworth | Released | (Note: Elford-Alliyu signed for Tamworth following his release.) |
| 30 June 2013 | DF | (England) | David Hunt | Oxford United | Released | (Note: David Hunt joined Oxford United following his release.) |
| 30 June 2013 | MF | (England) | Aaron Wickham | Aldershot Town | Released | (Note: Wickham signed for Aldershot Town following his release.) |
| 30 June 2013 | DF | | Jon Dollery | Lewes | Released | (Note: Dollery signed for Lewes following his release.) |
| 30 June 2013 | DF | (England) | Shaun Cooper | Portsmouth | Released | (Note: Cooper signed for Portsmouth following his release.) |
| 30 June 2013 | FW | (England) | Richard Brodie | Gateshead | Released | (Note: Brodie signed for Gateshead after his release) |
| 31 January 2014 | FW | (England) | Gary Alexander | Burton Albion | ? | |
| 31 January 2014 | MF | (England) | Nicky Adams | Rotherham United | Undisclosed | |
| 27 February 2014 | DF | (England) | James Hurst | Valur | Released | (Note: Hurst signed for Valur following the termination of his contract.) |

1. Sparrow joined Scunthorpe United after his release.
2. Dumbuya joined Notts County after his release.
3. Elford-Alliyu signed for Tamworth following his release.
4. David Hunt joined Oxford United following his release.
5. Wickham signed for Aldershot Town following his release.
6. Dollery signed for Lewes following his release.
7. Cooper signed for Portsmouth following his release.
8. Brodie signed for Gateshead after his release
9. Hurst signed for Valur following the termination of his contract.

=== Loans in ===
| Date | Position | Nationality | Name | From | Date until | Ref. |
|---|---|---|---|---|---|---|
| 6 August 2013 | MF | (England) | Luke Rooney | Swindon Town | 1 January 2014 | |
| 25 October 2013 | MF | (England) | Kyle Bennett | Doncaster Rovers | 25 November 2013 | |
| 6 January 2014 | FW | (England) | Matt Tubbs | A.F.C. Bournemouth | 31 May 2014 | |
| 31 January 2014 | GK | (England) | Ross Atkins | Derby County | 28 February 2014 | |
| 7 February 2014 | MF | (England) | Hiram Boateng | Crystal Palace | 5 April 2014 | |
| 7 February 2014 | FW | (England) | Sullay Kaikai | Crystal Palace | 5 April 2014 | |
| 27 March 2014 | MF | (England) | Jeffrey Monakana | Brighton & Hove Albion | 24 April 2014 | |
| 27 March 2014 | MF | (Wales) | Gwion Edwards | Swansea City | 31 May 2014 | |

=== Loans out ===
| Date from | Position | Nationality | Name | To | Date until | Ref. |
|---|---|---|---|---|---|---|
| 10 September 2013 | FW | (Bermuda) | Jonté Smith | Havant & Waterlooville | 10 October 2013 | |
| October 2013 | FW | (Bermuda) | Jonté Smith | Metropolitan Police | November 2013 | |
| 22 November 2013 | DF | (England) | Connor Essam | Dartford | 22 December 2013 | |
| November 2013 | DF | (England) | Alex Malins | Bognor Regis Town | ? | |
| 17 January 2014 | DF | (England) | James Hurst | Northampton Town | 17 February 2014 | |
| 21 January 2014 | FW | (Bermuda) | Jonté Smith | Gosport Borough | 21 February 2014 | |
| 31 January 2014 | FW | (England) | Emile Sinclair | Northampton Town | 31 May 2013 | |
| 13 March 2014 | FW | (Bermuda) | Jonté Smith | PS Kemi Kings | 30 June 2014 | |
| March 2014 | DF | (England) | Alex Malins | Lewes | ? | |

== Player statistics ==
=== Appearances and goals ===
| No. | Pos | Nat | Player | Total | | League One | | FA Cup | | Football League Cup | | Football League Trophy | |
| No. | Pos | Nat | Player | Apps | Goals | Apps | Goals | Apps | Goals | Apps | Goals | Apps | Goals |
|---|---|---|---|---|---|---|---|---|---|---|---|---|---|
| 1 | GK | (England) ENG | Paul Jones | 51 | 0 | 46 | 0 | 3 | 0 | 1 | 0 | 1 | 0 |
| 2 | DF | (England) ENG | James Hurst | 21 | 0 | 11+7 | 0 | 1 | 0 | 1 | 0 | 1 | 0 |
| 3 | DF | (England) ENG | Mat Sadler | 51 | 1 | 46 | 1 | 3 | 0 | 1 | 0 | 1 | 0 |
| 4 | DF | (Ireland) EIR | Mark Connolly | 40 | 1 | 32+4 | 1 | 3 | 0 | 0 | 0 | 1 | 0 |
| 5 | DF | (England) ENG | Kyle McFadzean | 46 | 1 | 41+1 | 1 | 2+1 | 0 | 1 | 0 | 0 | 0 |
| 6 | DF | (England) ENG | Connor Essam | 3 | 0 | 0+2 | 0 | 0 | 0 | 0 | 0 | 1 | 0 |
| 7 | FW | (Republic of Ireland) IRL | Billy Clarke | 31 | 7 | 28+1 | 7 | 1 | 0 | 0+1 | 0 | 0 | 0 |
| 8 | MF | (Argentina) ARG | Sergio Torres | 24 | 0 | 6+16 | 0 | 1 | 0 | 0 | 0 | 1 | 0 |
| 9 | FW | (New Zealand) NZL | Rory Fallon | 8 | 0 | 3+5 | 0 | 0 | 0 | 0 | 0 | 0 | 0 |
| 9 | FW | (England) ENG | Gary Alexander | 26 | 5 | 9+12 | 4 | 1+2 | 0 | 1 | 1 | 0+1 | 0 |
| 10 | MF | (England) ENG | Andy Drury | 46 | 5 | 36+5 | 5 | 3 | 0 | 0+1 | 0 | 0+1 | 0 |
| 11 | MF | (England) ENG | Josh Simpson | 41 | 2 | 37+1 | 2 | 1 | 0 | 1 | 0 | 1 | 0 |
| 12 | DF | (Wales) WAL | Joe Walsh | 43 | 5 | 39 | 5 | 3 | 0 | 1 | 0 | 0 | 0 |
| 14 | FW | (England) ENG | Jamie Proctor | 49 | 7 | 21+23 | 6 | 2+1 | 1 | 1 | 0 | 1 | 0 |
| 15 | MF | (England) ENG | Dannie Bulman | 43 | 0 | 34+5 | 0 | 2 | 0 | 1 | 0 | 0+1 | 0 |
| 16 | FW | (England) ENG | Sullay Kaikai | 5 | 0 | 2+3 | 0 | 0 | 0 | 0 | 0 | 0 | 0 |
| 16 | MF | (Wales) WAL | Nicky Adams | 29 | 3 | 24 | 1 | 3 | 0 | 1 | 2 | 1 | 0 |
| 17 | MF | (England) ENG | Hiram Boateng | 1 | 0 | 1 | 0 | 0 | 0 | 0 | 0 | 0 | 0 |
| 18 | MF | (England) ENG | Luke Rooney | 5 | 0 | 0+4 | 0 | 0 | 0 | 0+1 | 0 | 0 | 0 |
| 18 | FW | (England) ENG | Matt Tubbs | 18 | 8 | 18 | 8 | 0 | 0 | 0 | 0 | 0 | 0 |
| 19 | MF | (England) ENG | Jeffrey Monakana | 4 | 0 | 0+4 | 0 | 0 | 0 | 0 | 0 | 0 | 0 |
| 20 | FW | (England) ENG | Emile Sinclair | 19 | 4 | 9+6 | 2 | 2+1 | 1 | 0 | 0 | 1 | 1 |
| 21 | MF | (England) ENG | Mike Jones | 46 | 4 | 40+2 | 3 | 2 | 0 | 1 | 0 | 1 | 1 |
| 22 | DF | (England) ENG | Louis John | 0 | 0 | 0 | 0 | 0 | 0 | 0 | 0 | 0 | 0 |
| 23 | FW | (Bermuda) BER | Jonte Smith | 0 | 0 | 0 | 0 | 0 | 0 | 0 | 0 | 0 | 0 |
| 24 | DF | (England) ENG | Alex Mallins | 0 | 0 | 0 | 0 | 0 | 0 | 0 | 0 | 0 | 0 |
| 25 | GK | (England) ENG | Jonny Maddison | 0 | 0 | 0 | 0 | 0 | 0 | 0 | 0 | 0 | 0 |
| 26 | MF | (Wales) WAL | Gwion Edwards | 6 | 2 | 5+1 | 2 | 0 | 0 | 0 | 0 | 0 | 0 |
| 28 | MF | (Ireland) EIR | Gary Dicker | 11 | 0 | 9+2 | 0 | 0 | 0 | 0 | 0 | 0 | 0 |
| 29 | DF | (England) ENG | Paul Connolly | 7 | 0 | 5+2 | 0 | 0 | 0 | 0 | 0 | 0 | 0 |
| 32 | MF | (England) ENG | Kyle Bennett | 4 | 0 | 4 | 0 | 0 | 0 | 0 | 0 | 0 | 0 |
| 32 | GK | (England) ENG | Ross Atkins | 0 | 0 | 0 | 0 | 0 | 0 | 0 | 0 | 0 | 0 |
| 33 | MF | (England) ENG | Bradley Isaacs | 0 | 0 | 0 | 0 | 0 | 0 | 0 | 0 | 0 | 0 |
| 34 | MF | (England) ENG | Ryan Richefond | 0 | 0 | 0 | 0 | 0 | 0 | 0 | 0 | 0 | 0 |
