= 2012–13 Birmingham City F.C. season =

Birmingham City F.C.
2012–13 season
- Acting chairman: Peter Pannu
- Manager: Lee Clark
- Stadium: St Andrew's
- Championship: 12th
- FA Cup: Third round
- League Cup: Second round
- Top goalscorer: League: Marlon King (13); All: Marlon King (14)
- Highest home attendance: 19,630 (vs Wolverhampton Wanderers, 1 April 2013)
- Lowest home attendance: 8,962 (vs Leeds United, FA Cup 3rd round replay, 15 January 2013)
- Average home league attendance: 16,702
Home colours	Away colours	Third colours

The 2012–13 season was Birmingham City Football Club's 110th season in the English football league system and second consecutive season in the Football League Championship. It ran from 1 July 2012 to 30 June 2013.

Under the management of Lee Clark, who succeeded Chris Hughton in June 2012 with the club in financial turmoil and a transfer embargo in place, Birmingham finished the season in 12th place in the Championship, seven points clear of relegation and seven points outside the playoff positions. In the 2012–13 League Cup, they were eliminated in the second round by Coventry City, and they lost to Leeds United in the third round of the FA Cup after a replay.

Thirty-six players made at least one appearance in first-team competition, and there were seventeen different goalscorers. Wade Elliott appeared in 47 of the 50 matches over the season; Jack Butland played every minute of the 46 Championship matches. Despite injury forcing him to miss the last quarter of the season, Marlon King was again leading scorer; all but one of his 14 goals were scored in league games.

== Background and pre-season ==
Birmingham City finished fourth in the 2011–12 Football League Championship, achieving a play-off place against fifth-placed Blackpool. This they lost over two legs.

The 2012–13 home kit had royal blue shirt and socks with white shorts, the change kit was all black, and there was a pink third shirt. It was manufactured by Diadora and carried the logo of the club's main sponsor, entertainment and leisure company EzeGroup.

The first-team squad had a week's training in Westendorf, Austria, ending with a friendly match on 21 July, before returning to England to face Shrewsbury Town three days later.

Pre-season friendly match details
Date	Opponents	Venue	Result	Score F–A	Scorers	Attendance	Ref
21 July 2012	Borussia Mönchengladbach	N	D	2–2	Davies 51', Asante 81'	1,400	
24 July 2012	Shrewsbury Town	A	W	2–1	Hancox 39', Žigić 72'	3,202	
28 July 2012	Cheltenham Town	A	L	0–1		2,636	
31 July 2012	Bury	A	W	5–1	Hughes 2' o.g., Løvenkrands (2) 15', 23', Burke 39', King 42'	807	
4 August 2012	Plymouth Argyle	A	W	5–0	Redmond (2) 35', 41', Burke 55', Løvenkrands (2) 59', 64'	2,778	
11 August 2012	Royal Antwerp	H	L	1–3	Morrison 24'	5,408	

== Championship ==
=== August–September ===
Jack Butland made his Birmingham debut – three days after his first game for England – as Birmingham opened their League campaign at home to Charlton Athletic with a 1–1 draw via a 94th-minute equaliser from substitute Nikola Žigić. At Sheffield Wednesday, he let a cross go through his hands onto Réda Johnson's head to open the scoring. Half-time substitute Žigić made the score 2–1, but Wednesday scored on the break, and Marlon King's late penalty was little consolation. Manager Lee Clark took responsibility for the defeat, blaming his use of a 4–3–3 starting formation. Žigić started alongside King at Watford, and loanee Ben Gordon made his debut in place of the injured David Murphy, but Steven Caldwell gave away a penalty in the third minute, Birmingham conceded a second goal after 17, and a poor performance was only enlivened when Morgaro Gomis came into the game with 25 minutes left.

With Curtis Davies, Žigić and Darren Ambrose added to the injury list, Birmingham went into the home match against pointless Peterborough United with five teenagers on the substitutes' bench. A farcical own goal by goalkeeper Bobby Olejnik, whose attempted punch of Wade Elliott's free kick went back over his head and bounced over a defender on the line, gave Birmingham their first league win of the season; the goal was later awarded to Elliott. Transfer deadline signing Paul Caddis, making his debut at right back, was named man of the match. Birmingham's first away point of the season came at Nottingham Forest. Substitute Elliott set up King, whose shot was parried to Hayden Mullins who volleyed home from just inside the penalty area, and Nathan Redmond avoided two tackles to cross for King who doubled the lead after 71 minutes. Simon Cox controlled a long aerial ball with one touch and lobbed Butland with a second, and with four minutes remaining, man-of-the-match Pablo Ibáñez deflected the ball into his own net.

Loanee Leroy Lita opened the scoring on his home debut in Birmingham's second league win, against Bolton Wanderers, but only days after Stephen Carr was sidelined for six months by knee surgery, Caddis dislocated a shoulder, leaving the team without a recognised right back. The attendance, of 14,693, was their lowest home league crowd for 15 years; according to the Birmingham Mail, fans blamed high ticket prices and financial uncertainty surrounding the club's ownership. Eight hundred fewer attended the visit of Barnsley, in which Murphy and Pablo went off injured, and Birmingham fan Craig Davies contributed four of the visitors' five goals in a 23-minute second-half spell to inflict Birmingham's worst home league defeat for 25 years. Lee Clark issued a public apology for the "embarrassing performance". Because Murphy's torn hamstring and Pablo's chipped bone in the foot were expected to keep them out for a month, reducing the club to two fit senior defenders, left-back Paul Robinson signed for a month as a free agent. He made a strong debut as Birmingham successfully defended a 1–0 lead, via Chris Burke's first goal of the season, a 25-yard (23 m) volley, at league leaders Brighton & Hove Albion. The second half was delayed for 25 minutes by floodlight failure.

=== October–November ===
October began with a 2–1 defeat at Cardiff City. Lita neatly touched Elliott's free kick home, but Cardiff's goals came from defensive errors: Packwood played them onside for the first, and failure to deal with a corner allowed Mark Hudson to score the winner. New loanee James Hurst made his debut as a second-half substitute. Courtesy of half-price ticket offers, more than 18,000 saw Birmingham lose 1–0 to Huddersfield Town; Žigić was sent off for a high tackle and Mitch Hancox made his competitive debut as substitute for the injured Davies. Clark accused the players of failing to take responsibility, making it clear that he was "not sitting in the dressing room telling them not to tackle, to pussyfoot around, telling them to mis-place passes. They can't just hide behind me all the time, they've got to come out fighting." Butland produced what he described as the best performance of his career and Ravel Morrison, selected for the first time since August after problems with his attitude to training led Clark to consider terminating his loan, was influential as Birmingham narrowly failed to beat league leaders Leicester City. Away to Millwall, Birmingham went 3–0 down in a seven-minute spell in the first half, two of the three scored by former loanee Chris Wood, before Marlon King scored the first hat-trick of his senior career to secure the draw. On his 40th birthday, Lee Clark selected the same starting eleven away at Leeds United, where Lita scored the only goal of the game from 30 yards (27 m).

After Redmond gave the ball away in midfield, former Birmingham striker DJ Campbell scored the only goal of a dull meeting with Ipswich Town. Žigić, returning from suspension as a second-half substitute, missed two clear chances, with a free header and when one-on-one with the goalkeeper. Recalled to the starting eleven, Burke scored his second of the season three days later at home to Bristol City. Žigić made an assist for King, but his own profligacy continued, and he was clearly annoyed by Peter Løvenkrands' insistence on taking, and then missing, a stoppage-time penalty. A slow start at Blackburn Rovers was punished by Ruben Rochina's penalty after he was fouled by Murphy, but King equalised after Žigić hit the post. Robinson, deputising at centre half for the injured Davies, cleared off the line from Jordan Rhodes. For the third time this season, Birmingham went three goals behind, this time at home to Hull City where former Birmingham trainee Sone Aluko scored twice and took the corner that led to the third. Morrison's first goal for the club, a "spectacular volley" from Žigić's knockdown, began the attempted fightback, which continued immediately after the break when Žigić headed on Murphy's long ball to King who wrong-footed the goalkeeper to score his tenth of the season. Terry McDermott said afterwards that "to concede three goals at home and in the manner in which we did it is not acceptable to anybody."

The Birmingham Mail's Colin Tattum described the visit to Derby County as "a microcosm of what we've witnessed from Blues this campaign". An ineffective first half, in which they went one goal down, was followed by a lively second period, in which debutant loanee Rob Hall won a penalty, converted by King, and Løvenkrands headed a second goal, but the defence was unable to stop Derby regaining the lead. Davies's second-half header from a corner earned Birmingham a point at Blackpool, before November ended with the televised visit of third-placed Middlesbrough. Birmingham conceded after 15 minutes, but in first-half stoppage time, King was fouled by André Bikey for a penalty from which he equalised. Pablo's defensive hesitancy allowed Middlesbrough to regain the lead before Elliott chested down a defensive clearance on the edge of the penalty area and hit a dipping volley above the goalkeeper's hands. With ten minutes left, Løvenkrands picked up a loose ball in midfield and played a through ball that King ran onto and placed a "clinical finish" across the goalkeeper.

=== December–January ===
King's 14th goal of the season came when he sliced a clearance into his own net to gift Wolverhampton Wanderers a win. Crystal Palace took a two-goal lead, and Løvenkrands was booked for diving in the penalty area, before substitute Žigić scored a well-placed header with his first touch before Papa Bouba Diop, on his first start, equalised with a powerful header from a corner. Teenage midfielder Callum Reilly made his league debut. Seven teenagers started the match, and Žigić played as a lone striker after Løvenkrands was injured during the pre-match warm-up, at home to Burnley. Davies opened the scoring with a header before Charlie Austin's headed equaliser was disallowed when the referee called play back for a foul on the player who had crossed the ball. Burnley took the lead in a two-minute spell in the second half before Žigić shot under the goalkeeper to equalise in the 89th minute. Two headed goals by Davies gave Birmingham a win at Barnsley to take them seven points clear of the relegation zone, though they were fortunate that Craig Davies, who scored four of Barnsley's five in the reverse fixture, missed a penalty. In what Clark thought "was our most inept performance for many, many weeks", at Bolton Wanderers, Žigić scored early but after Bolton secured a two-goal lead, his frustration got the better of him and he was booked twice in quick succession.

With no senior striker available, Mullins injured in the warmup, and his replacement, Reilly, injured half an hour into the match, Birmingham lost at home to league leaders Cardiff City by a single goal, tapped in by Joe Mason after Butland failed to deal with a long-range shot. Reilly's first senior goal gave Birmingham the lead as Clark returned to the club that sacked him less than a year earlier, but a 93rd-minute equaliser secured Huddersfield Town a share of the points. Caldwell's header from Hall's corner opened the scoring at home to Brighton & Hove Albion; Brighton took the lead, but in stoppage time, goalkeeper Tomasz Kuszczak appeared to have substitute Žigić's header under control but allowed it drop into the net. Davies opened the scoring away at Burnley, again from Hall's corner, then Robinson conceded a penalty from which Ross Wallace equalised. After Dean Marney was sent off, Birmingham had more of the game. Žigić should have scored when his late header hit the post, but he compensated with a flick-on that King volleyed home.

=== February–March ===
Former Birmingham manager Alex McLeish had tried to buy Chris Burke for Nottingham Forest during the January transfer window. Burke showed him what they were missing by scoring twice as Birmingham beat Forest 2–1, "a glorious left-foot effort off the underside of the bar from the edge of the area" and a second-half tap-in. On a poor pitch at Charlton Athletic, the home side took the lead after 88 minutes, but Elliott converted Burke's cross for a 94th-minute equaliser. Clark criticised Žigić for producing "possibly the worst training session in terms of a professional footballer I have ever come across", and dropped him for the visit of Watford. Birmingham were overrun, losing 4–0. Žigić's response was clearly acceptable to Clark, for he returned to the starting lineup for a goalless draw at home to Sheffield Wednesday, Birmingham's first clean sheet for three months, in which he failed to take several chances. February ended with a visit to Peterborough United. Žigić opened the scoring, Reilly hit the bar from distance, and a deflected Burke shot completed a 2–0 win, although Butland made what Peterborough manager Darren Ferguson called an "unbelievable double save", no penalty was awarded when Hancox appeared to foul Nathaniel Mendez-Laing, and Reilly was fortunate to avoid a second yellow card for a "cynical trip" on Kane Ferdinand. Clark substituted Reilly immediately after the incident.

Clark's relief at George Boyd's leaving Peterborough lasted one match. Now at Hull City, Boyd took advantage of weak defending to tear Birmingham apart; Hull manager Steve Bruce claimed he "didn't know he was that good." Hancox was able to restrict the influence of Blackpool's Tom Ince, but a combination of bad luck, when a shot by Løvenkrands struck the inside of a goalpost, rolled along the line and came out, and a bad miss by Elliott late in the game restricted Birmingham to a draw. Redmond's first goal of the season, and loanee Wes Thomas's first two, took Birmingham above opponents Derby County and seven points clear of the relegation zone, and Žigić converted Shane Ferguson's cross at Middlesbrough to take them into the top half of the table for the first time since mid-September. March ended with an unexpected and emphatic 4–0 win at Crystal Palace, orchestrated by youngsters Redmond – according to Clark, "a super footballer, he plays high-tempo, he can beat people" – and Morrison – "a very, very talented young man ... he's like a kid in the park playing with his mates" – both of whom scored. Under pressure from Žigić, Damien Delaney turned the ball into his own net, and the fourth goal was a "sumptuous 30-yard free-kick" by Ferguson after Morrison was fouled.

=== April–May ===
In complete contrast, Birmingham went three goals down in the first half at home to Wolverhampton Wanderers. Elliott scored twice late in the game from the penalty spot – the second from the rebound after the penalty was saved – and 17-year-old Koby Arthur made his debut. According to Clark, "quite simply, without the ball in the first half we were rubbish". The visitors' Chris Taylor was the centre of attention as Birmingham drew with Millwall. He was booked for diving when it seemed that Caddis had fouled him, then his goal-bound shot was touched in by teammate Richard Chaplow. Initially disallowed for offside, the referee then awarded a goal because he thought the ball had crossed the line unassisted; when the fourth official informed him that Chaplow had indeed got a touch, he disallowed the goal again. In the second half, Taylor scored the equaliser. A point was gained at Leicester City when Burke converted a stoppage-time penalty awarded when Thomas was fouled outside the area. A 1–0 win at Bristol City confirmed that club's relegation, and Mullins' second goal of the season at home to Leeds United left Birmingham in 10th place, still mathematically within reach of the play-off positions and finally safe from relegation.

In the last away match of the season, Ipswich Town scored three times and had two disallowed in the first hour, a flat, uncompetitive defeat summed up by Clark as "I'm three stone overweight and even I could have gone out and played at that tempo." At home to Blackburn Rovers, they attacked from the start, but without reward until the 42nd minute, when Morrison received a pass from Gomis, slipped past two defenders, and shot from 20 yards (18 m) low into the corner of the net. Jordan Rhodes tied the scores in the second half, and despite Birmingham's greater possession and number of shots, they needed Robinson's late block of Cameron Stewart's shot to avoid another defeat.

Clark said that he envisaged keeping "three or four" senior players for the next season, but his priority would be "building a young vibrant squad". He confirmed that the club would be unable to pay transfer fees, and the budget would be sharply reduced, "so players coming in will not be getting the same salaries as they have in the past."

=== Match details ===
General source (match reports): Match content not verifiable from these sources is referenced individually.

Championship match details
Date	League position	Opponents	Venue	Result	Score F–A	Scorers	Attendance	Report
18 August 2012	12th	Charlton Athletic	H	D	1–1	Žigić 90+4'	18,210	
21 August 2012	19th	Sheffield Wednesday	A	L	2–3	Žigić 78', King 90+5' pen.	25,379	
25 August 2012	22nd	Watford	A	L	0–2		11,022	
1 September 2012	21st	Peterborough United	H	W	1–0	Elliott 29'	14,929	
15 September 2012	21st	Nottingham Forest	A	D	2–2	Mullins 69', King 71'	22,738	
18 September 2012	11th	Bolton Wanderers	H	W	2–1	Lita 16', King 48' pen.	14,693	
22 September 2012	19th	Barnsley	H	L	0–5		13,893	
29 September 2012	13th	Brighton & Hove Albion	A	W	1–0	Burke 27'	26,121	
2 October 2012	18th	Cardiff City	A	L	1–2	Lita 54'	20,278	
6 October 2012	21st	Huddersfield Town	H	L	0–1		18,437	
20 October 2012	20th	Leicester City	H	D	1–1	Løvenkrands 45+2'	18,271	
23 October 2012	20th	Millwall	A	D	3–3	King (3) 45+1', 49', 63'	9,258	
27 October 2012	17th	Leeds United	A	W	1–0	Lita 76'	22,152	
3 November 2012	18th	Ipswich Town	H	L	0–1		18,063	
6 November 2012	18th	Bristol City	H	W	2–0	Burke 59', King 73'	14,380	
10 November 2012	18th	Blackburn Rovers	A	D	1–1	King 17'	14,919	
17 November 2012	19th	Hull City	H	L	2–3	Morrison 38', King 46'	17,363	
24 November 2012	19th	Derby County	A	L	2–3	King 73' pen., Løvenkrands 82'	21,505	
27 November 2012	19th	Blackpool	A	D	1–1	Davies 48'	13,111	
30 November 2012	18th	Middlesbrough	H	W	3–2	King (2) 45+3' pen., 81', Elliott 66'	15,322	
8 December 2012	19th	Wolverhampton Wanderers	A	L	0–1		21,339	
15 December 2012	19th	Crystal Palace	H	D	2–2	Žigić 66', Diop 82'	17,158	
22 December 2012	19th	Burnley	H	D	2–2	Davies 30', Žigić 89'	17,284	
26 December 2012	19th	Barnsley	A	W	2–1	Davies 35', 38'	9,191	
29 December 2012	20th	Bolton Wanderers	A	L	1–3	Žigić 11'	17,068	
1 January 2013	20th	Cardiff City	H	L	0–1		17,493	
12 January 2013	20th	Huddersfield Town	A	D	1–1	Reilly 45+1'	14,214	
19 January 2013	20th	Brighton & Hove Albion	H	D	2–2	Caldwell 18', Žigić 90+2'	15,299	
26 January 2013	17th	Burnley	A	W	2–1	Davies 21', King 90'	11,576	
2 February 2013	16th	Nottingham Forest	H	W	2–1	Burke 45+1', 80'	17,738	
9 February 2013	16th	Charlton Athletic	A	D	1–1	Elliott 90+4'	17,269	
16 February 2013	17th	Watford	H	L	0–4		18,933	
19 February 2013	17th	Sheffield Wednesday	H	D	0–0		15,738	
23 February 2013	16th	Peterborough United	A	W	2–0	Žigić 34', Burke 80'	8,350	
2 March 2013	17th	Hull City	A	L	2–5	Løvenkrands 83', Burke 87'	17,146	
5 March 2013	18th	Blackpool	H	D	1–1	Davies 45'	13,532	
9 March 2013	14th	Derby County	H	W	3–1	Thomas (2) 67', 90+2', Redmond 75'	15,850	
16 March 2013	11th	Middlesbrough	A	W	1–0	Žigić 81'	14,348	
29 March 2013	10th	Crystal Palace	A	W	4–0	Redmond 24', Delaney 32' o.g., Morrison 64', Ferguson 69'	17,189	
1 April 2013	11th	Wolverhampton Wanderers	H	L	2–3	Elliott (2) 55' pen., 90+6'	19,630	
6 April 2013	13th	Millwall	H	D	1–1	Thomas 49'	15,302	
12 April 2013	13th	Leicester City	A	D	2–2	Žigić 61', Burke 90+1' pen.	25,554	
16 April 2013	12th	Bristol City	A	W	1–0	Elliott 16'	12,093	
20 April 2013	10th	Leeds United	H	W	1–0	Mullins 71'	17,666	
27 April 2013	10th	Ipswich Town	A	L	1–3	Burke 90'	21,921	
4 May 2013	12th	Blackburn Rovers	H	D	1–1	Morrison 42'	18,979	

=== League table ===
Pos	Team	Pld	W	D	L	GF	GA	GD	Pts
10	Derby County	46	16	13	17	65	62	+3	61
11	Burnley	46	16	13	17	62	60	+2	61
12	Birmingham City	46	15	16	15	63	69	−6	61
13	Leeds United	46	17	10	19	57	66	−9	61
14	Ipswich Town	46	16	12	18	48	61	−13	60

Updated to match(es) played on 4 May 2013. Source:
Rules for classification: 1) points; 2) goal difference; 3) number of goals scored.

=== Results summary ===
Overall								Home						Away					
Pld	W	D	L	GF	GA	GD	Pts	W	D	L	GF	GA	GD	W	D	L	GF	GA	GD
46	15	16	15	63	69	−6	61	7	9	7	29	34	−5	8	7	8	34	35	−1

== League Cup ==
Birmingham entered the League Cup in the first round, in which they beat League Two club Barnet at home by five goals to one. Will Packwood made his first-team debut, Steven Caldwell scored his first goal for the club, and new signings Darren Ambrose and Peter Løvenkrands both scored. In the second round, they visited Coventry City of League One, who had just sacked their manager and were under joint caretakers Richard Shaw and former Birmingham captain Lee Carsley. After Løvenkrands' header gave them an early lead and Chris Burke hit the bar, they fell behind midway through the first half. Jonathan Spector equalised just before half time with his first goal for the club, but the hosts took control, and Carl Baker scored Coventry's winner during extra time when the defence failed to deal with a cross.

League Cup match details
Round	Date	Opponents	Venue	Result	Score F–A	Scorers	Attendance	Report
First round	14 August 2012	Barnet	H	W	5–1	King 38' pen., Caldwell 49', Ambrose 54', Løvenkrands 90+1', Elliott 90+4'	9,905	
Second round	28 August 2012	Coventry City	A	L	2–3	Løvenkrands 4', Spector 44'	10,859	

== FA Cup ==
Birmingham entered the FA Cup in the third round, together with all other clubs in the top two divisions. Drawn away to fellow Championship side Leeds United, they prepared for the match by giving squad numbers to several youth players. Colin Doyle made his second appearance of the season in goal, and, with all senior strikers missing through injury or suspension, Ravel Morrison and Nathan Redmond played up front. Morrison's running put pressure on the Leeds defence, who were punished when Wade Elliott ran from deep before unleashing a "stunning long-range shot" to take the lead. After Birmingham failed to take advantage of their first-half superiority, Curtis Davies was robbed of the ball, leading to Luciano Becchio's equaliser on the hour. Shortly afterwards, Will Packwood broke his left tibia and fibula when landing awkwardly from an apparently innocuous aerial collision with Becchio. The 17-year-old Reece Hales made a late debut, and the game finished 1–1. Butland was left out of the team for the replay, to avoiding his becoming cup-tied and jeopardising a potential sale, and Becchio was absent ill. On a cold night, in front of only 7,400 home fans, Elliott gave Birmingham a first-half lead. Ross McCormack tied the scores in the second half, and six minutes later, the referee adjudged Paul Robinson to have handled the ball inside the penalty area, and El Hadji Diouf scored with a chipped penalty.

FA Cup match details
Round	Date	Opponents	Venue	Result	Score F–A	Scorers	Attendance	Report
Third round	5 January 2013	Leeds United	A	D	1–1	Elliott 32'	11,447	
Third round replay	15 January 2013	Leeds United	H	L	1–2	Elliott 36'	8,962	

== Transfers ==
At the end of the 2011–12 season, Birmingham released first-team players Caleb Folan, Luke Hubbins, Cian Hughton, Ashley Sammons and Enric Vallès. In late June, goalkeeper Ben Foster's loan at West Bromwich Albion was made permanent and midfielder Jordon Mutch joined Cardiff City, both for undisclosed fees. Following publication of the 2011 accounts, and reflecting increased financial prudence and revenue raised from player sales, the Football League lifted the club's transfer embargo in early July. In the next few days, they signed three players on free transfers – Denmark international forward Peter Løvenkrands, veteran goalkeeper David Lucas, and midfielder Hayden Mullins – and paid an undisclosed fee for Crystal Palace midfielder Darren Ambrose. Lucas signed a one-year deal and the others signed for two years. Before the transfer window closed, they added two loan signings: attacking midfielder Ravel Morrison from West Ham United for the season, and Chelsea left-back Ben Gordon until January. Despite rumours linking Žigić with Real Mallorca and Butland with Everton, the only movement on deadline day was a loan swap bringing Swindon Town full-back Paul Caddis in for the season with Adam Rooney going the other way.

When the loan window opened, Leroy Lita arrived on a three-month loan from Swansea City to replace Rooney. At the end of September, with the club reduced to two fit senior defenders, experienced left-back Paul Robinson joined as a free agent on a one-month contract and young West Bromwich Albion right-back James Hurst signed on a month's loan. Veteran midfielder Pape Bouba Diop joined as a free agent for a month in October.

The first departure of the January 2013 transfer window was third-choice goalkeeper David Lucas, who joined Fleetwood Town as goalkeeping coach. Fringe striker Jake Jervis left for Elazığspor, near the bottom of the Turkish Süper Lig, for a fee reported as €50,000; he scored on his debut away at Fenerbahçe. Diop was released in January when his monthly contract expired. After a potential sale of the club fell through in December, the chairman confirmed that player sales would be needed in the transfer window to relieve the financial difficulties: "no one is for sale and everyone is available". The only departure on deadline day was Butland, who had made it clear that he was not prepared to leave for a club where he would not be playing regular first-team football. and was reported to have rejected the chance to speak to Chelsea about a possible transfer. He signed a four-and-a-half-year contract with Premier League club Stoke City, and returned to Birmingham on loan for the rest of the season. According to Stoke, the fee was an initial £3.3 million, rising to £3.5m. This freed up wages for the arrival on loan of AFC Bournemouth striker Wes Thomas.

After Rob Hall returned to West Ham for treatment to a groin injury at the end of February, Clark brought in Northern Ireland international winger Shane Ferguson on loan from Newcastle United.

=== In ===
Date	Player	Club†	Fee	Ref
9 July 2012	Peter Løvenkrands	(Newcastle United)	Free	
10 July 2012	David Lucas	(Rochdale)	Free	
12 July 2012	Hayden Mullins	Portsmouth	Free	
13 July 2012	Darren Ambrose	Crystal Palace	Undisclosed	
25 September 2012	Paul Robinson	(Bolton Wanderers)	Free	
19 October 2012	Papa Bouba Diop	(West Ham United)	Free	

† Brackets round club names indicate the player's contract with that club had expired before he joined Birmingham.

==== Loan in ====
Date	Player	Club	Return	Ref
6 August 2012	Ravel Morrison	West Ham United	End of season	
10 August 2012	Ben Gordon	Chelsea	7 January 2013	
31 August 2012	Paul Caddis	Swindon Town	End of season	
8 September 2012	Leroy Lita	Swansea City	12 November 2012	
1 October 2012	James Hurst	West Bromwich Albion	28 October 2012	
22 November 2012	Rob Hall	West Ham United	16 March 2013	
31 January 2013	Jack Butland	Stoke City	End of season	
31 January 2013	Wes Thomas	AFC Bournemouth	End of season	
28 February 2013	Shane Ferguson	Newcastle United	4 May 2013	
21 March 2013	Olly Lee	Barnet	End of season	

=== Out ===
Date	Player	Fee	Joined	Ref
22 June 2012	Jordon Mutch	Undisclosed	Cardiff City	
29 June 2012	Ben Foster	Undisclosed	West Bromwich Albion	
1 January 2013	David Lucas	Free	Fleetwood Town	
16 January 2013	Jake Jervis	Undisclosed	Elazığspor	
17 January 2013	Papa Bouba Diop	Released		
31 January 2013	Jack Butland	£3.5m	Stoke City	
30 June 2013	Steven Caldwell	Released	(Toronto FC)	
30 June 2013	Stephen Carr	Retired		
30 June 2013	Jack Deaman	Released	(Eastbourne Borough)	
30 June 2013	Keith Fahey	Released	(St Patrick's Athletic)	
30 June 2013	Morgaro Gomis	Released	(Dundee United)	
30 June 2013	Graham Hutchison	Released	(Worcester City)	
30 June 2013	Pablo Ibáñez	Released		
30 June 2013	Fraser Kerr	Released	(Motherwell)	
30 June 2013	Adam Rooney	Released	(Oldham Athletic)	

† Brackets round club names indicate the player joined that club after his contract with Birmingham expired.

==== Loan out ====
Date	Player	Club	Return	Ref
30 July 2012	Graham Hutchison	Lincoln City	13 November 2012	
10 August 2012	Fraser Kerr	Motherwell	End of season	
22 August 2012	Jake Jervis	Carlisle United	22 September 2012	
31 August 2012	Adam Rooney	Swindon Town	End of season	
20 October 2012	Jake Jervis	Tranmere Rovers	One month	
22 November 2012	Jake Jervis	Portsmouth	23 December 2012	
8 December 2012	Graham Hutchison	Worcester City	7 January 2013	
28 March 2013	Akwasi Asante	Shrewsbury Town	End of season	
28 March 2013	Jack Deaman	Cheltenham Town	End of season	
7 May 2013	Steven Caldwell	Toronto FC	30 June 2013	

== Appearances and goals ==
Numbers in parentheses denote appearances as substitute.
Players with squad numbers struck through and marked † left the club during the playing season.
Players with names in italics and marked * were on loan from another club for the whole of their season with Birmingham.
Players listed with no appearances have been in the matchday squad but only as unused substitutes.

Players included in matchday squads
No.	Pos.	Nat.	Name	League		FA Cup		League Cup		Total		Discipline	
No.	Pos.	Nat.	Name	Apps	Goals	Apps	Goals	Apps	Goals	Apps	Goals	A yellow rectangle, denoting the yellow penalty card shown to a player being cautioned	A red rectangle, denoting the red penalty card shown to a player being sent off
1	GK	ENG	Jack Butland	46	0	0	0	0	0	46	0	1	0
3	DF	ENG	David Murphy	13	0	0	0	1	0	14	0	1	0
4	DF	SCO	Steven Caldwell	33 (1)	1	2	0	2	1	37 (1)	2	3	0
5	DF	ESP	Pablo Ibáñez	6	0	0	0	0 (1)	0	6 (1)	0	0	0
6	DF	ENG	Curtis Davies	40 (1)	6	2	0	2	0	44 (1)	6	4	0
7	MF	SCO	Chris Burke	29 (12)	8	2	0	2	0	33 (12)	8	2	0
8	MF	ENG	Hayden Mullins	22 (6)	2	0	0	2	0	24 (6)	2	5	0
9	FW	JAM	Marlon King	22 (4)	13	1	0	2	1	25 (4)	14	0	0
10	MF	ENG	Darren Ambrose	3 (3)	0	0	0	2	1	5 (3)	1	0	0
11	MF	DEN	Peter Løvenkrands	13 (9)	3	0 (1)	0	2	2	15 (10)	5	3	0
12	MF	ENG	Ravel Morrison*	23 (4)	3	2	0	1	0	26 (4)	3	5	0
13	GK	IRE	Colin Doyle	0	0	2	0	1	0	3	0	0	0
14	MF	SEN	Morgaro Gomis	9 (6)	0	2	0	1 (1)	0	12 (7)	0	4	0
15	MF	ENG	Wade Elliott	38 (6)	6	2	2	0 (1)	1	40 (7)	9	7	0
~~16~~	DF	ENG	Ben Gordon*†	1	0	0	0	1	0	2	0	0	0
16	MF	GHA	Koby Arthur	0 (2)	0	0	0	0	0	0 (2)	0	0	0
17	FW	IRE	Adam Rooney	0	0	0	0	0 (1)	0	0 (1)	0	0	0
18	MF	IRE	Keith Fahey	5 (4)	0	0	0	0	0	5 (4)	0	0	0
19	FW	SRB	Nikola Žigić	23 (12)	9	0 (1)	0	0	0	23 (13)	9	6	2
~~20~~	FW	ENG	Jake Jervis†	0 (2)	0	0	0	0	0	0 (2)	0	1	0
20	FW	ENG	Wes Thomas*	5 (6)	3	0	0	0	0	5 (6)	3	0	0
21	FW	NLD	Akwasi Asante	0	0	0	0	0	0	0	0	0	0
22	MF	ENG	Nathan Redmond	22 (16)	2	2	0	0 (2)	0	24 (18)	2	2	0
23	DF	USA	Jonathan Spector	25 (4)	0	0	0	1	1	26 (4)	1	4	1
24	DF	USA	Will Packwood	5	0	1	0	1	0	7	0	0	0
~~26~~	GK	ENG	David Lucas†	0	0	0	0	1	0	1	0	0	0
26	MF	ENG	Olly Lee	0	0	0	0	0	0	0	0	0	0
27	DF	ENG	Mitch Hancox	14 (5)	0	0 (1)	0	0	0	14 (6)	0	2	0
28	DF	SCO	Paul Caddis*	27	0	1	0	0	0	28	0	1	0
~~29~~	FW	ENG	Leroy Lita*†	9 (1)	3	0	0	0	0	9 (1)	3	0	0
~~29~~	FW	ENG	Rob Hall*†	11 (2)	0	0	0	0	0	11 (2)	0	0	0
30	DF	ENG	Paul Robinson	34 (1)	0	2	0	0	0	36 (1)	0	7	0
~~31~~	DF	ENG	James Hurst*†	2 (1)	0	0	0	0	0	2 (1)	0	1	0
31	DF	ENG	Emmitt Delfouneso	0	0	0	0	0	0	0	0	0	0
~~32~~	MF	SEN	Papa Bouba Diop†	1 (1)	1	0	0	0	0	1 (1)	1	1	0
32	MF	NIR	Shane Ferguson	10 (1)	1	0	0	0	0	10 (1)	1	1	0
33	MF	IRE	Callum Reilly	14 (4)	1	1	0	0	0	15 (4)	1	3	0
34	MF	ENG	Josh Hawker	0	0	0	0	0	0	0	0	0	0
35	FW	ENG	Reece Hales	0	0	0 (1)	0	0	0	0 (1)	0	0	0
37	GK	ENG	Nick Townsend	0	0	0	0	0	0	0	0	0	0
38	FW	ENG	Marcel Henry-Francis	0	0	0	0	0	0	0	0	0	0
39	FW	FRA	Eddy Gnahoré	0	0	0	0	0	0	0	0	0	0
40	MF	ENG	Ryan Higgins	0	0	0	0	0	0	0	0	0	0

Players not included in matchday squads
No.	Pos	Nat	Name
2	DF	IRE	Stephen Carr
25	DF	ENG	Jack Deaman
36	DF	ENG	James Fry
