= Paul Jones (footballer, born 1986) =

English footballer

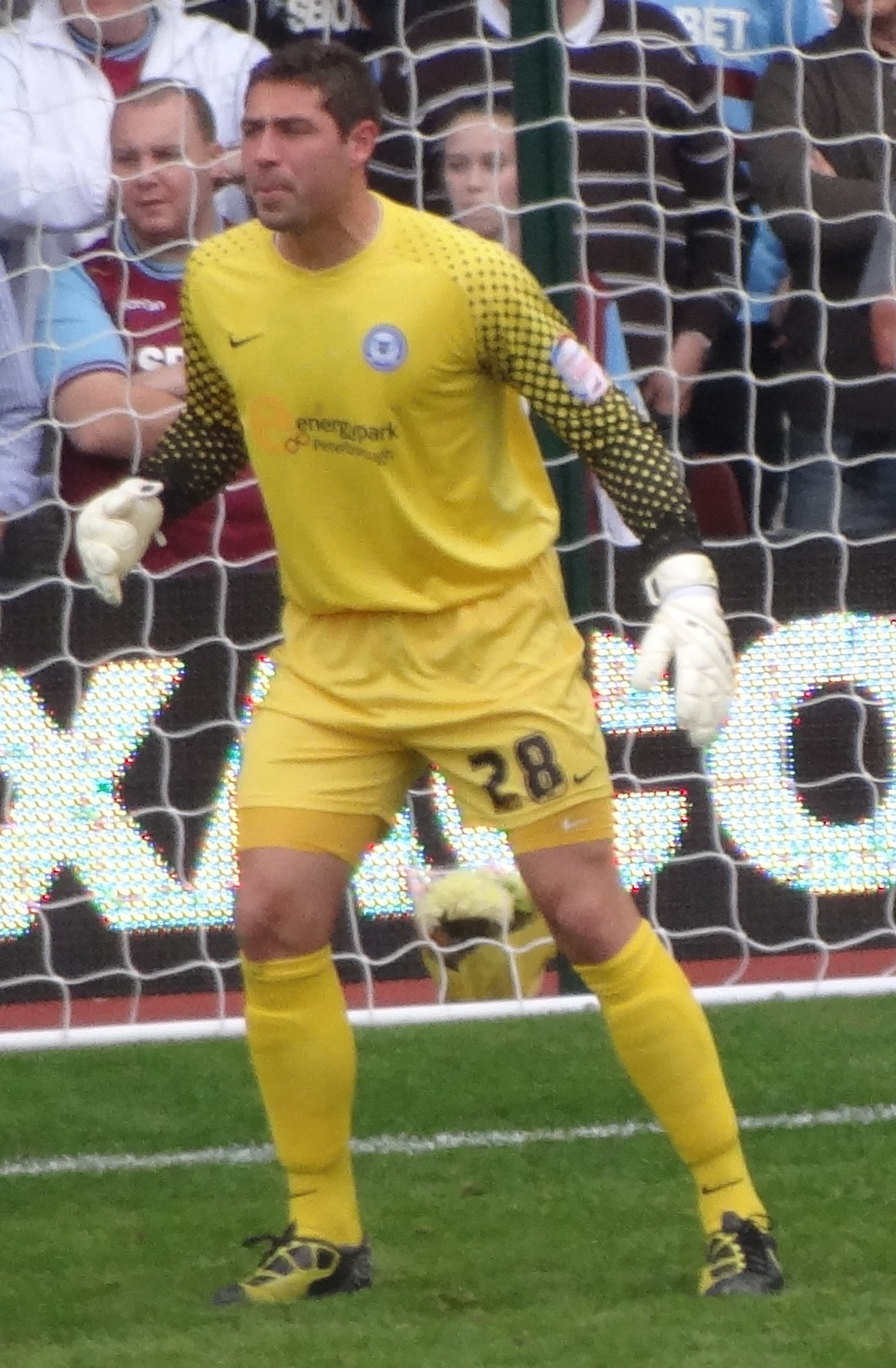
- Jones playing for Peterborough United in 2011

Personal information
- Full name: Paul Jones
- Date of birth: 28 June 1986 (age 40)
- Place of birth: Maidstone, England
- Height: 6 ft 3 in (1.91 m)
- Position: Goalkeeper

Youth career
- 2001–2002: Charlton Athletic
- 2002–2004: Leyton Orient

Senior career*
Years	Team	Apps	(Gls)
2004–2005	Leyton Orient	0	(0)
2004–2005	→ Exeter City (loan)	23	(0)
2005–2011	Exeter City	158	(0)
2011	→ Peterborough United (loan)	1	(0)
2011–2012	Peterborough United	35	(0)
2012–2014	Crawley Town	92	(0)
2014–2016	Portsmouth	55	(0)
2016	→ Crawley Town (loan)	8	(0)
2016–2018	Norwich City	0	(0)
2018	→ Exeter City (loan)	0	(0)
2018–2019	Fleetwood Town	0	(0)
2019–2020	Sheffield Wednesday	0	(0)
2021–2026	King's Lynn Town	128	(0)
- * Club domestic league appearances and goals as of 12 October 2024 (UTC)

Paul Jones (born 28 June 1986) is an English former professional footballer who played as a goalkeeper

== Career ==
=== Charlton Athletic and Leyton Orient Youth ===
Born in Maidstone, Kent, Jones began his career with the youth system of Charlton Athletic in 2001 before signing for Leyton Orient's youth system in 2002. Despite never breaking into their first team, Jones was thought highly of by then youth coach Alex Inglethorpe.

=== Exeter City ===
When Alex Inglethorpe was appointed manager of Conference side Exeter City in Autumn 2004, one of his first moves was to bring Paul Jones in on loan. Arriving part way through the 2004–05 season, Jones quickly established himself as City's first choice keeper, making 23 appearances. In January 2005 he played in Exeter's memorable 0–0 draw at Old Trafford in the FA Cup. On 1 July 2005, Inglethorpe acquired Jones from Orient, and signed him to a permanent deal. At the end of the 2005–06 season, Inglethorpe left Exeter and was replaced by new manager Paul Tisdale. During the pre-season, Jones was forced to compete for his spot with then backup keeper, and former Exeter youth trainee Martin Rice. Days prior to Exeter's first match of the season, Tisdale selected Rice as his first choice keeper. Jones then became Exeter's second choice keeper. He returned to the first-team for the 2007 Conference playoff final, in which he saved a penalty – becoming the first person to do so at the new Wembley Stadium. Exeter failed to win the final though and during the next season, Jones figured mostly as an understudy to Rice's replacement Andy Marriott. He was chosen in the first team again for the play-offs and this time, Exeter managed to win the final at Wembley, with Jones keeping a clean sheet. In the 2008–09 season he played in all 46 League Two matches for Exeter City. Also he won the 2008–09 player of the season award for Exeter City after many stunning performances in goal throughout the season.

=== Peterborough United ===
On 31 January 2011 Jones joined Peterborough United on loan until the end of the 2010–11.season. He made the move permanent by signing an initial one-year contract on 24 June 2011 to join on a free transfer. He found himself picked as first choice keeper for the majority of the season, as a result Peterborough offered him a new contract but he rejected it.

=== Crawley Town ===
On 26 May 2012, it was confirmed that Jones had signed for newly promoted League One side Crawley Town. He made his debut on 14 August, starting in a League Cup match against Championship side Millwall which ended 2–2, with Crawley winning on penalties by 4–1, and Jones saving two penalties in the shoot-out. After two seasons in League One with Crawley, he was released by at the end of the 2013–14 season. He made 92 league appearances in a Red Devils shirt

=== Portsmouth ===
In June 2014 Jones signed for League Two club Portsmouth on a three-year deal. He was manager Andy Awford's first signing as Pompey boss and was the only keeper at Fratton Park when joining, after Trevor Carson's loan expired, whilst both John Sullivan and Phil Smith were released.

On 1 February 2016, Jones re-joined Crawley Town on a 28-day loan.

=== Norwich City ===
On 4 July 2016, Jones signed for Norwich City on a two-year deal as goalkeeping cover. Jones made his first appearance for the Canaries in the 6–1 EFL Cup win over Coventry City. However, with him being third choice goalkeeper behind John Ruddy and Michael McGovern, and later Angus Gunn, this would be his only first team appearance for Norwich. In January 2018, he was loaned to Exeter City for the remainder of the season, but again was merely cover for Christy Pym and made no first team appearances.

=== Fleetwood Town ===
On 2 August 2018, Jones signed for Fleetwood Town on a one-year deal.

=== Sheffield Wednesday ===
On 6 August 2019, Jones signed for Sheffield Wednesday on a free transfer.

On the 24 June 2020, he signed a one-month extension to cover the rest of the 2019/20 season which was delayed due to the coronavirus.

=== King's Lynn Town ===
On 1 June 2021, Jones joined National League side King's Lynn Town on a free transfer, linking up with his former Leyton Orient youth-team manager Ian Culverhouse.

== Career statistics ==
As of match played 25 February 2023

Appearances and goals by club, season and competition
Club	Season	League			FA Cup		League Cup		Other		Total	
Club	Season	Division	Apps	Goals	Apps	Goals	Apps	Goals	Apps	Goals	Apps	Goals
Leyton Orient	2004–05	League Two	0	0	—		0	0	0	0	0	0
Exeter City (loan)	2004–05	Conference	23	0	2	0	—		1 (Note: Appearance in FA Trophy)	0	26	0
Exeter City	2005–06	Conference	37	0	1	0	—		2	0	40	0
Exeter City	2006–07	Conference	22	0	1	0	—		1	0	24	0
Exeter City	2007–08	Conference	9	0	1	0	—		3 (Note: Appearance in Conference Play-off)	0	13	0
Exeter City	2008–09	League Two	46	0	1	0	0	0	0	0	47	0
Exeter City	2009–10	League One	26	0	0	0	1	0	0	0	27	0
Exeter City	2010–11	League One	18	0	0	0	1	0	3 (Note: Appearances in EFL Trophy)	0	22	0
Exeter City	Total		158	0	4	0	2	0	9	0	173	0
Peterborough United (loan)	2010–11	League One	4	0	—		—		—		4	0
Peterborough United	2011–12	Championship	35	0	0	0	2	0	—		37	0
Crawley Town	2012–13	League One	46	0	3	0	3	0	2	0	54	0
Crawley Town	2013–14	League One	46	0	3	0	1	0	1	0	51	0
Crawley Town	Total		92	0	6	0	4	0	3	0	105	0
Portsmouth	2014–15	League Two	46	0	2	0	2	0	2	0	52	0
Portsmouth	2015–16	League Two	9	0	0	0	2	0	1	0	12	0
Portsmouth	Total		55	0	2	0	4	0	3	0	64	0
Crawley Town (loan)	2015–16	League Two	8	0	0	0	—		—		8	0
Norwich City	2016–17	Championship	0	0	0	0	1	0	—		1	0
Norwich City	2017–18	Championship	0	0	0	0	0	0	—		0	0
Norwich City	Total		0	0	0	0	1	0	0	0	1	0
Exeter City (loan)	2017–18	League Two	0	0	—		—		—		0	0
Fleetwood Town	2018–19	League Two	0	0	0	0	1	0	2	0	3	0
Fleetwood Town	Total		0	0	0	0	1	0	2	0	3	0
Sheffield Wednesday	2019–20	Championship	0	0	0	0	0	0	—		0	0
King's Lynn Town	2021–22	National League	44	0	1	0	—		2	0	47	0
King's Lynn Town	2022–23	National League North	32	0	2	0	—		1	0	35	0
King's Lynn Town	Total		76	0	3	0	—		3	0	82	0
Career totals			450	0	17	0	14	0	21	0	502	0

== Honours ==
Exeter City

- Conference Premier play-offs: 2008
- Football League Two runner-up: 2008–09

Peterborough United

- Football League One play-offs: 2011
