= James Hurst (footballer) =

English footballer (born 1992)

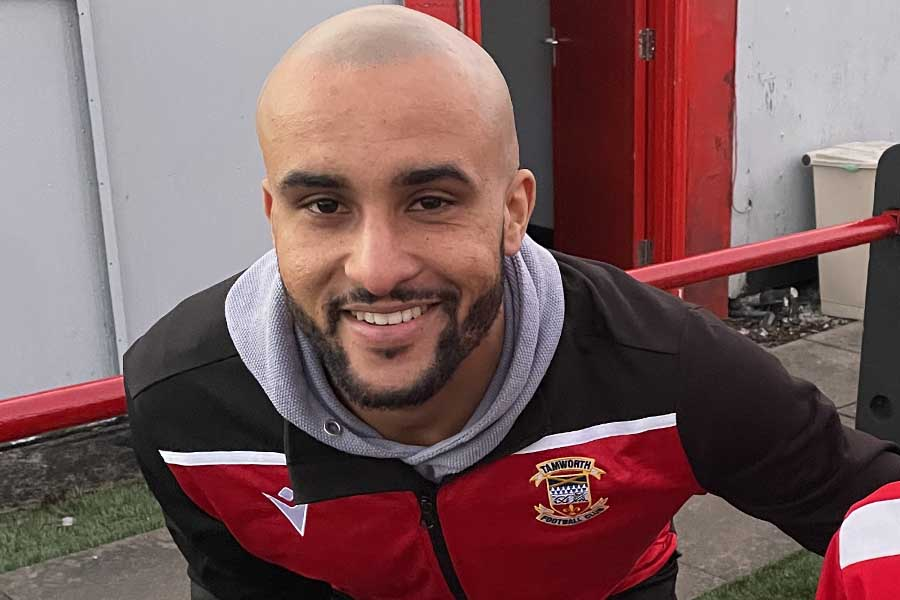
- Hurst in 2022

Personal information
- Full name: James Hurst
- Date of birth: 31 January 1992 (age 34)
- Place of birth: Sutton Coldfield, England
- Height: 6 ft 1 in (1.85 m)
- Position: Defender

Youth career
- 2001–2008: West Bromwich Albion

Senior career*
Years	Team	Apps	(Gls)
2008–2010	Portsmouth	0	(0)
2010	→ ÍBV (loan)	16	(1)
2010–2013	West Bromwich Albion	1	(0)
2011	→ Blackpool (loan)	2	(0)
2011–2012	→ Shrewsbury Town (loan)	7	(0)
2012	→ Chesterfield (loan)	10	(0)
2012	→ Birmingham City (loan)	3	(0)
2013	→ Shrewsbury Town (loan)	4	(0)
2013	Valur	7	(2)
2013–2014	Crawley Town	18	(0)
2014	→ Northampton Town (loan)	1	(0)
2014	Valur	7	(0)
2014–2015	Hednesford Town	33	(3)
2015–2016	Torquay United	17	(7)
2015–2016	→ Guiseley (loan)	18	(3)
2016–2017	AFC Telford United	12	(0)
2017	Dover Athletic	14	(0)
2017–2018	Wrexham	17	(0)
2018	Nuneaton Borough	5	(0)
2018	Welling United	3	(0)
2018–2019	Sutton Coldfield Town		
2019–2020	Hednesford Town	16	(1)
2020–2022	Buxton	24	(2)
2022–2023	Tamworth	21	(5)
2023–2024	Ilkeston Town	0	(0)

International career^{‡}
2007	England U16	2	(0)
2008–2009	England U17	12	(0)
2011	England U19	5	(0)
2011	England U20	1	(0)
- * Club domestic league appearances and goals as of 13:58 6 October 2024 (UTC) ‡ National team caps and goals as of 22:00, 20 August 2022 (UTC)

James Hurst (born 31 January 1992) is an English footballer who plays as a defender.

His professional career saw him play club football in the Premier League for West Bromwich Albion, in the Football League for Blackpool, Shrewsbury Town, Chesterfield, Birmingham City, Crawley Town and Northampton Town, and in the Icelandic Úrvalsdeild for ÍBV and Valur. Internationally, he represented England at levels from under-16 to under-20.

== Career ==
=== Professional ===
Hurst was born in Sutton Coldfield, West Midlands. He came through the ranks at West Bromwich Albion, but declined to sign for them, opting instead for a scholarship with the 2008 FA Cup winners, Portsmouth, who reportedly beat Arsenal, Manchester United and Aston Villa to his signature. He never made a first team appearance for Portsmouth, but did have a loan spell at Icelandic club ÍBV during the summer of 2010, where he scored one goal.

Hurst rejoined West Bromwich Albion on a two-year deal in September 2010 after Portsmouth's relegation from the Premier League. He made his debut for Albion on 1 December 2010 in the League Cup quarter-final clash with Ipswich Town which ended in a 1–0 defeat at Portman Road.

On 31 August 2011, Hurst was sent out on loan to Blackpool for the entire season, on condition that he could be recalled at any time. He made his debut as a substitute in the 1–1 draw with Cardiff City on 17 September. On 21 October he was recalled to his parent club.

On 18 November, he joined League Two side Shrewsbury Town on a six-week loan. Shrewsbury Town were seeking to extend his loan, but on 11 January 2012, Hurst joined League One team Chesterfield on loan until the end of the season.

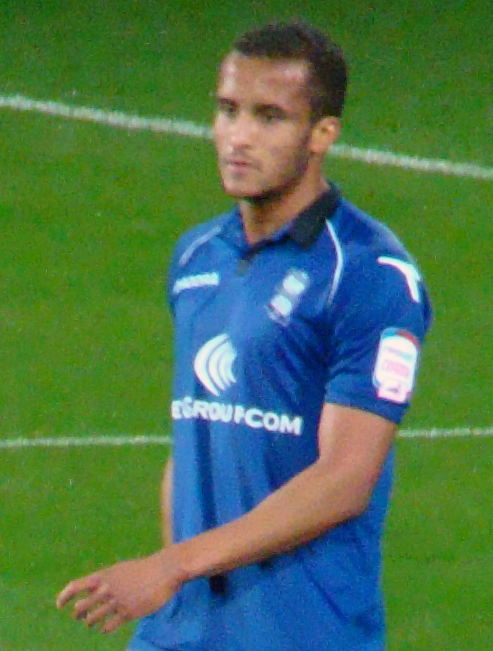
Hurst playing for Birmingham City in 2012

Hurst signed for Championship club Birmingham City on 1 October 2012 on a one-month youth loan, and made his debut the following day, as a second-half substitute in a 2–1 defeat at Cardiff City. Fitness problems resulted in Paul Robinson being preferred, and Hurst made just three appearances before returning to Albion.

Hurst signed for Icelandic club Valur in May 2013. After less than two months, he returned to England to join Crawley Town of League One on a one-year contract. On 17 January 2014, Hurst signed for Northampton Town on a month's loan. On 27 February 2014, Hurst's contract at Crawley Town was cancelled by mutual consent. He rejoined Valur for another spell on 11 March 2014.

=== Non-league ===
On 2 July 2014, Hurst joined Hednesford Town of the Conference North. He signed for Conference Premier club Torquay United for the following season, but was suspended by the club from all football activities pending an investigation over an alleged incident on a night out in November 2015. He then moved on loan to divisional rivals Guiseley.

Hurst signed for AFC Telford United in May 2016, reuniting with former Hednesford manager Rob Smith. After being sent off in a match against Salford City in October, he was involved in an argument with supporters on social media, leading to his suspension and a club investigation into his behaviour. He was subsequently transfer-listed by the club and fined two weeks wages.

Hurst signed for Dover Athletic on 4 January 2017. He made his debut for the club in their 2–2 draw with York City, coming off the bench at half-time to replace Sammy Moore. He was released at the end of the season and signed a one-year contract with National League club Wrexham.

He left Wrexham on 13 March 2018 by mutual consent.

He was signed by National League North side Nuneaton Borough for the 2018–19 season, however, after only five games, he signed for National League South side Welling United.

It was confirmed on 27 December 2018 that Hurst had joined his home town club Sutton Coldfield Town. On 1 June 2019, he returned to Hednesford Town.

His contract was terminated with Hednesford Town in January 2020. On 25 August 2020, he signed with Buxton.

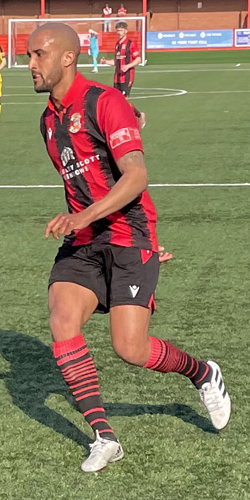
Hurst playing for Tamworth in March 2022.

On 18 January 2022, Hurst signed for Southern League Premier Division Central rivals Tamworth. Hurst made his debut for Tamworth the same day, playing the full match in an away quarter final fixture against Leamington in the Birmingham Senior Cup, which the home side won 3–1.

Hurst set off on a pretty impressive goal scoring run, which coincided with the appointment of Andy Peaks as manager at Tamworth. In Peaks first match as manager, Hurst scored a brace in a 6–0 demolition of Barwell on 26 February 2022 in a home Southern League Premier Division Central fixture.

James bagged an 82nd minute equaliser in the next match, an away Southern League Premier Division Central fixture at Hitchin Town on 28 February 2022. Hurst scored his fourth goal for Tamworth on 19 March 2022, in a Southern League Premier Division Central fixture away at AFC Rushden & Diamonds, James scored the 37th minute to half the deficit after the home side had taken an early 2–0 lead, the game finished 2–2 with Jordaan Brown equalising in the second half.

Tamworth produced a newsletter on 9 May 2022, which confirmed that Hurst along with fellow defender Lucas Yeomans were in fact on longer term contracts, and would both remain with the club for the 2022–23 season.

On 20 August 2022, Hurst scored his first goal of the 2022–23 season in an away fixture against Bedford Town, Hurst came on as a 74th minute substitute for Alex Collard, and went on to score to make the score 8–0 to Tamworth on the 83rd minute, with the match finishing 8–1 to Tamworth.

In May 2023, he signed for Ilkeston Town.

== Arrest ==
In June 2020, he was remanded in custody by a court in Glasgow after pleading guilty to acting in a threatening or abusive manner towards police officers following a domestic incident; he coughed in officers' faces, told them he had COVID-19, used derogatory language to describe a female police officer and shouted anti-Scottish abuse. He was sentenced to 160 hours unpaid community service. In August 2024, Hurst received a two-year prison sentence and a five-month restraining order at Birmingham Crown Court after he pleaded guilty to one count of stalking, two of harassment, two of sending false communications and one of breaching a non-molestation order.

== Career statistics ==
As of match played 20 August 2022

Appearances and goals by club, season and competition
Club	Season	League			National Cup		League Cup		Other		Total	
Club	Season	Division	Apps	Goals	Apps	Goals	Apps	Goals	Apps	Goals	Apps	Goals
Portsmouth	2009–10	Premier League	0	0	0	0	0	0	—		0	0
ÍBV (loan)	2010	Úrvalsdeild	16	1	1	0	—		—		17	1
West Bromwich Albion	2010–11	Premier League	1	0	1	0	1	0	—		3	0
West Bromwich Albion	2011–12	Premier League	0	0	—		0	0	—		0	0
West Bromwich Albion	2012–13	Premier League	0	0	0	0	0	0	—		0	0
West Bromwich Albion	Total		1	0	1	0	1	0	0	0	3	0
Blackpool (loan)	2011–12	Championship	2	0	—		—		—		2	0
Shrewsbury Town (loan)	2011–12	League Two	7	0	2	0	—		—		9	0
Chesterfield (loan)	2011–12	League One	10	0	—		—		3 (Note: Appearance(s) in Football League Trophy)	0	13	0
Birmingham City (loan)	2012–13	Championship	3	0	—		—		—		3	0
Shrewsbury Town (loan)	2012–13	League One	4	0	—		—		—		4	0
Valur	2013	Úrvalsdeild	7	2	1	0	—		—		8	2
Crawley Town	2013–14	League One	18	0	1	0	1	0	1	0	21	0
Northampton Town (loan)	2013–14	League Two	1	0	—		—		—		1	0
Valur	2014	Úrvalsdeild	7	0	2	0	—		—		9	0
Hednesford Town	2014–15	Conference North	33	3	1	0	—		1 (Note: Appearance(s) in FA Trophy)	0	35	3
Torquay United	2015–16	National League	17	7	0	0	—		0	0	17	7
Guiseley (loan)	2015–16	National League	18	3	0	0	—		3	1	21	4
AFC Telford United	2016–17	National League North	12	0	2	0	—		0	0	14	0
Dover Athletic	2016–17	National League	14	0	—		—		—		14	0
Wrexham	2017–18	National League	17	0	1	0	—		1	0	19	0
Tamworth	2021–22	Southern League Premier Division Central	16	4	0	0	—		1 (Note: One appearance in Birmingham Senior Cup)	0	17	4
Tamworth	2022–23	Southern League Premier Division Central	3	1	0	0	—		0	0	3	1
Total			206	21	12	0	2	0	10	1	231	22

== Honours ==
Chesterfield

- Football League Trophy: 2011–12
