= Jamie Proctor =

English footballer (born 1992)

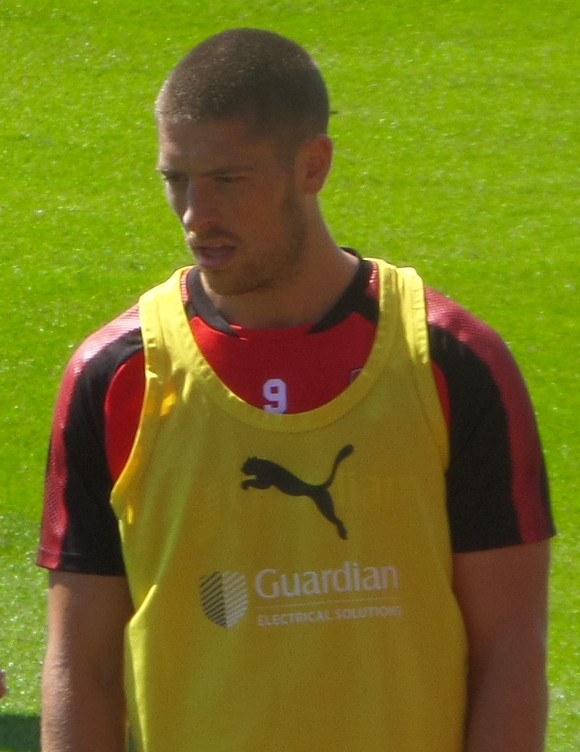
- Proctor with Rotherham United in 2017

Personal information
- Full name: Jamie Thomas Proctor
- Date of birth: 25 March 1992 (age 34)
- Place of birth: Preston, Lancashire, England
- Height: 6 ft 2 in (1.88 m)
- Position: Striker

Youth career
- 2004–2010: Preston North End

Senior career*
Years	Team	Apps	(Gls)
2010–2012	Preston North End	37	(4)
2010	→ Stockport County (loan)	7	(0)
2012–2013	Swansea City	0	(0)
2012	→ Shrewsbury Town (loan)	2	(0)
2013–2014	Crawley Town	62	(13)
2014–2016	Fleetwood Town	64	(12)
2016	→ Bradford City (loan)	2	(1)
2016	Bradford City	16	(4)
2016–2017	Bolton Wanderers	21	(0)
2017	→ Carlisle United (loan)	17	(4)
2017–2021	Rotherham United	23	(2)
2019–2020	→ Scunthorpe United (loan)	13	(1)
2020	→ AFC Fylde (loan)	8	(1)
2020–2021	→ Newport County (loan)	10	(1)
2021	→ Wigan Athletic (loan)	15	(2)
2021–2023	Port Vale	51	(14)
2023–2024	Barrow	24	(1)
2024–2025	Southport	32	(2)
2025	Ramsbottom United	2	(0)
Total		406	(62)
- * Club domestic league appearances and goals

Jamie Thomas Proctor (born 25 March 1992) is an English former professional footballer who played as a striker.

Proctor began his career at hometown club Preston North End, turning professional in January 2010 and making his first-team debut four months later. He was loaned out to Stockport County in August 2010 and, having featured 34 times for Preston in the 2011–12 season, was signed to Premier League club Swansea City in August 2012. He spent time on loan at Shrewsbury Town before being sold to Crawley Town in January 2013. He played 49 games in the 2013–14 season, scoring seven goals, and then moved on to Fleetwood Town in June 2014. He spent 1 1/2-seasons with Fleetwood before being sold to Bradford City following a short loan spell. He spent the 2016–17 League One promotion-winning season with Bolton Wanderers, part of which he spent on loan at Carlisle United, and was then sold to Rotherham United in July 2017.

He spent four seasons with Rotherham without establishing himself in the first team after rupturing his knee ligaments at the start of the 2017–18 campaign and instead enjoyed loan spells with Scunthorpe United, AFC Fylde, Newport County and Wigan Athletic. He signed with Port Vale in July 2021 and helped the club to win promotion out of League Two via the play-offs in 2022. He joined Barrow and retired from professional football at the end of the 2023–24 season. He resumed his career in non-League football with Southport and Ramsbottom United.

== Career ==
=== Preston North End ===
Born in Ingol, Preston, Lancashire, Proctor came through the youth academy at hometown club Preston North End from the age of eight. He scored 15 goals at youth-team level in the 2008–09 season and was part of an under-18 side that knocked Manchester City and Sunderland out of the FA Youth Cup the following year. On 27 January 2010, Proctor was handed a 2 1/2-year professional contract. Manager Darren Ferguson handed Proctor his professional début on the last day of the 2009–10 Championship season, when he came on as a 78th-minute substitute for Chris Brown in a 4–1 defeat to Reading at the Madejski Stadium on 2 May 2010.

On 13 August 2010, Proctor joined League Two club Stockport County on a 28-day loan aged just 17. Having impressed manager Paul Simpson during training, he made his debut the next day, coming on as a 61st-minute substitute for Danny Rowe in a 0–0 draw with Wycombe Wanderers at Edgeley Park. His loan spell was extended for another month until October. On 28 September, Proctor set up a goal for George Donnelly in a 2–2 draw with Accrington Stanley. He made seven appearances for the "Hatters", before returning to Preston after Simpson claimed that Stockport's dire financial situation meant "we've had to let him go for the sake of a couple of hundred quid". Proctor was on the fringes of the "Lilywhites" first-team squad during the 2010–11 season and had to wait until the last game of the season to score his first senior goal in a 3–1 win against Watford at Deepdale, by which stage Preston's relegation into League One had already been confirmed after a disappointing season under the management of Phil Brown.

Proctor was injured with a double hernia in October 2011. Upon his recovery, he struggled to establish himself in the first-team under the management of Graham Westley. He started 26 games and made seven substitute appearances throughout the 2011–12 season, scoring three goals.

=== Swansea City ===
On 18 August 2012, Proctor signed a two-year contract with Premier League club Swansea City, who paid Preston an undisclosed fee. He was signed to be a part of the club's new under-21 team rather than a part of Michael Laudrup's first-team plans as chairman Huw Jenkins cited a need to build for the future. He had been identified as a target by previous manager Brendan Rodgers in 2011. His time at the Liberty Stadium was 'frustrating' as he made no appearances in any senior competitions and hated playing youth-team football. On 26 October 2012, Proctor joined League One club Shrewsbury Town on a month-long loan, with manager Graham Turner looking for a "good option" up front. He made his "Shrews" debut the next day, playing 90 minutes in a 2–2 draw with Colchester United at the New Meadow. However, he made just two further appearances for the club.

=== Crawley Town ===
On 16 January 2013, Proctor signed an 18-month deal with League One side Crawley Town after being purchased from Swansea for an undisclosed fee. He scored his first goals for the club with a brace in a 2–0 win at Bury on 2 March. He scored seven goals in 18 games at the Broadfield Stadium during the second half of the 2012–13 season.

Speaking in November 2013, Proctor said he was shocked that the "Red Devils" decided to sack manager Richie Barker following a run of bad results. Six months later, new manager John Gregory said that he wanted more consistency from Proctor. Proctor ended the 2013–14 season with seven goals from 25 starts and 24 substitute appearances. He was offered a new contract at Crawley on a 50% wage reduction, which he rejected.

=== Fleetwood Town ===
On 24 June 2014, Proctor joined League One club Fleetwood Town on a two-year deal to start on 1 July. He scored on his debut for the "Cod Army" after coming off the bench in a 2–1 win over Crewe Alexandra at Highbury Stadium on 9 August, earning praise from manager Graham Alexander for his fighting spirit. On 8 November, he was sent off after raising his hands to Cambridge United defender Richard Tait during a 1–0 defeat in the FA Cup first round. He scored eight goals from 33 starts and 11 substitute appearances throughout the 2014–15 campaign. New manager Steven Pressley, appointed in October 2015, looked to focus on pace over power, which led Proctor to struggle for first-team starts.

=== Bradford City ===
Proctor joined Bradford City on a one-month loan on 22 January 2016 as part of the transfer deal that saw Devante Cole move to Fleetwood for an undisclosed fee. The loan move was made permanent on 1 February, when Proctor signed a deal with Bradford until the end of the 2015–16 season. He scored on his debut for the "Bantams" in a 1–1 draw with Port Vale on 23 January. He then scored his first goals since signing for the club permanently in a 2–1 win over Doncaster Rovers at Valley Parade on 12 March. On 20 May, Proctor scored the equalising goal in the play-off semi-final second leg with Millwall; the game ended 1–1 and Bradford lost the tie 4–2 on aggregate.

=== Bolton Wanderers ===
On 5 July 2016, Proctor signed a two-year contract with League One club Bolton Wanderers after being signed by manager Phil Parkinson, who had previously taken him to Bradford. Proctor again scored on his debut for his new club, scoring in a 4–2 EFL Cup defeat at Blackpool on 9 August. However, this was to be his only goal in 29 appearances, 17 of which came from the substitutes' bench, in the first half of the 2016–17 season.

On 31 January 2017, Proctor joined League Two side Carlisle United on loan until the end of the 2016–17 season. Manager Keith Curle described the hectic race to bring Proctor to Brunton Park on deadline day, which saw Carlisle overcome an attempt from Portsmouth to sign the striker. He scored his first goal for the "Blues" on 4 February, and was later sent off for a second yellow card, in a 2–1 win at Leyton Orient. On 6 May, he scored the winning goal in a 3–2 victory at Exeter City that secured Keith Curle's "Cumbrians" a place in the play-offs. Carlisle went on to play Exeter in the play-off semi-finals, and were beaten 6–5 on aggregate.

=== Rotherham United ===
On 3 July 2017, Proctor was sold to Rotherham United for an undisclosed fee (later revealed to be £75,000), signing a two-year contract with the League One club. He scored his first competitive goal for the "Millers" in an EFL Cup first round victory against Lincoln City on 8 August. On 26 August, Proctor picked up a serious injury after colliding with Charlton Athletic's Chris Solly, with tests later revealing he had suffered tears to the anterior cruciate ligament, medial collateral ligament and his meniscus. Rotherham went on to win promotion at the end of the 2017–18 season as Proctor recovered from his injury and the subsequent knee surgeries. He returned to action in an EFL Cup tie against Wigan Athletic on 14 August 2018, scoring a brace in a 3–1 win at the New York Stadium. On 24 November, he came off the bench to score a last minute equaliser against local rivals Sheffield United in a 2–2 draw. He was restricted to just two Championship starts in the 2018–19 relegation season. However, he made a further 14 appearances from the bench.

On 30 August 2019, Proctor joined League Two club Scunthorpe United on loan until the end of the 2019–20 season. Rotherham had an abundance of strikers as they had already signed Freddie Ladapo and Carlton Morris earlier in the transfer window. However, he made just four starts in 13 league appearances for Paul Hurst's "Iron", scoring one goal. On 20 January 2020, Proctor joined National League club AFC Fylde on loan until the end of the season after finishing his loan at Scunthorpe United early. Upon bringing Proctor to Mill Farm, "Coasters" manager Jim Bentley boasted that "I've got a history within my managerial career of re-launching careers of players who might've lost their way for whatever reason such as lack of form or injury". Proctor would score one goal in nine games for Fylde.

Speaking in September 2020, Proctor said he had suffered "the worst three years you could imagine for a player" and admitted that "when I have played I haven't been good enough" but hoped to regain the trust of manager Paul Warne after fully recovering from his knee injury. On 16 October 2020, Proctor joined Newport County on loan until 17 January. He scored his first goal for the "Exiles" on 28 November, in a 3–0 FA Cup second round win against Salford City at Rodney Parade. He scored two goals in 13 games for Michael Flynn's Newport, of which only five appearances were league starts. On 1 February 2021, Proctor joined League One side Wigan Athletic on loan until the end of the 2020–21 season. Five days later, he scored on his debut for the "Latics" in a 3–2 defeat to AFC Wimbledon at the DW Stadium. Manager Leam Richardson said he was very impressed with Proctor's performance. He scored two goals for Wigan in seven starts and eight substitute appearances. On 17 May 2021, Rotherham United published their retained list, and confirmed Proctor would be leaving the club at the end of his contract.

=== Port Vale ===
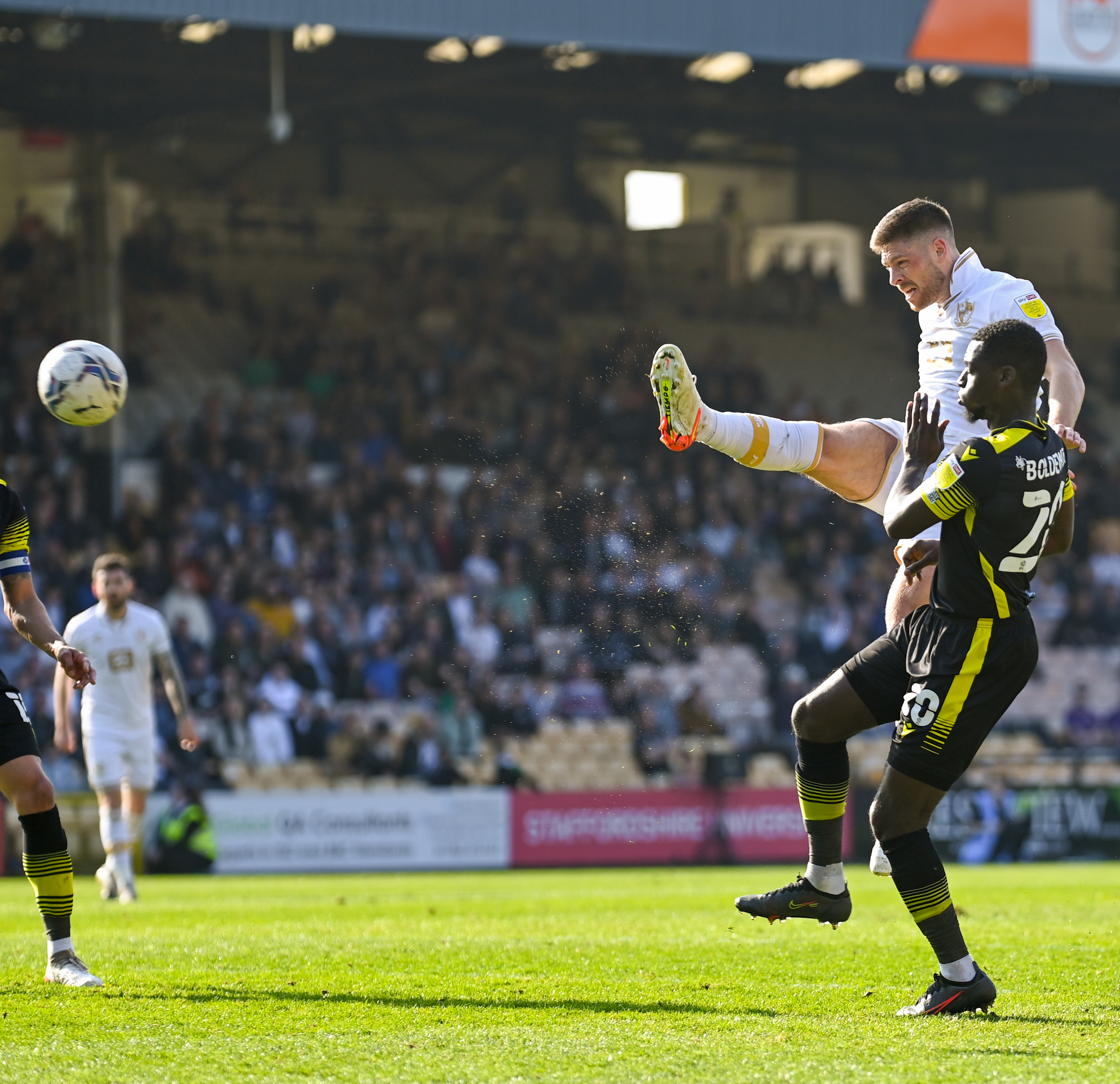
Jamie Proctor's scissor-kick volleyed goal (March 2022)

On 5 July 2021, Proctor signed a one-year contract with League Two side Port Vale. He enjoyed a strong start to the 2021–22 season, scoring five goals in his first seven games, including braces at Forest Green Rovers and at home to Rochdale. He added two further goals to his tally before being sidelined with a hernia problem that required surgery in mid-October. He returned to action with a substitute appearance at the end of November but aggravated the stomach injury when he collided with the opposition goalkeeper and had to undergo another operation on a thigh and pelvic tendon. He returned to action in mid-February and formed a strong partnership with James Wilson; former "Valiant" striker Tom Pope praised both players for their intelligence. On 26 March, he scored a scissor-kick volley in a 2–0 win over Sutton United at Vale Park that was reminiscent of Paolo Di Canio's memorable strike for West Ham United 22 years earlier. This later won him the club's Goal of the Season award. He played as a substitute in the play-off final at Wembley Stadium as Vale secured promotion with a 3–0 victory over Mansfield Town. He signed a new contract in June 2022, having finished as club's top-scorer with 15 goals.

Proctor struggled with a hip injury during his five appearances at the start of the 2022–23 season and manager Darrell Clarke confirmed in September that he had been ruled out of action for a few months after undergoing an operation. He returned to the pitch at the end of January and scored his first goal in ten months on 11 February. By the time of his recovery he faced competition up front from James Wilson, Ellis Harrison and Matty Taylor. David Flitcroft, the club's director of football, confirmed that the player's contract would not be renewed beyond June 2023.

=== Barrow ===
On 20 June 2023, Proctor agreed a one-year deal (with an option for a further year) with League Two club Barrow. Manager Pete Wild had attempted to sign him the previous summer. He scored on his debut in a 2–1 win over Sutton United at Holker Street on 12 August. On 10 February, he was sent off following an off-the-ball incident with Kofi Balmer in a 2–0 defeat at AFC Wimbledon. His suspension was increased to four games after he demonstrated improper behaviour towards a match official. He ended the 2023–24 season with one goal in 27 games and was not retained beyond the summer. He then retired from professional football to concentrate on his business interests.

=== Later career ===
On 15 July 2024, Proctor signed a one-year deal with National League North club Southport. He made 35 appearances in the 2024–25 season, scoring three goals, and left the club upon the expiry of his contract.

On 18 July 2025, Proctor joined North West Counties League Premier Division club Ramsbottom United for the 2025–26 season. He played two games for the club.

== Style of play ==
Proctor is a 6 ft 2 in (1.88 m) target man striker who can hold the ball up and bring other players into the game. He is hard working and has said: "you'll get 100% from me, some days there will be good performances and some days might be less so but what you will get is hard work and giving it my all".

== Personal life ==
Proctor has degrees in sports journalism and business and set up a Preston-based coaching academy in 2020; he described the coaching there as "professional, private and more technical". He has attended courses at the Open University, Staffordshire University and the University of Sunderland. He had a baby daughter in 2018. In November 2019, he made a plea in the Rotherham Advertiser for charities to contact him with voluntary work opportunities after he watched a documentary on food banks. He was hired by wealth advisory firm Skybound Wealth in September 2025.

== Career statistics ==
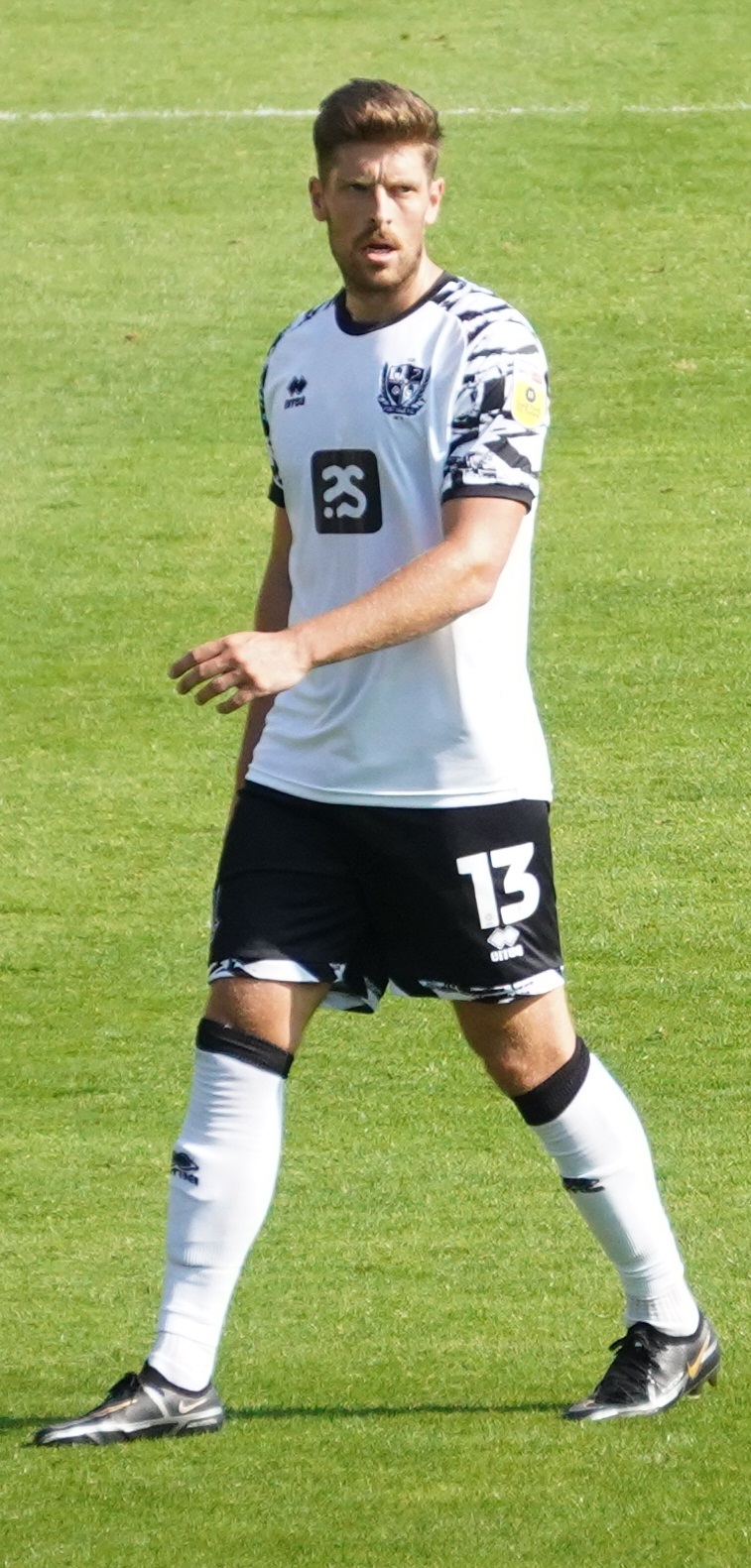
Proctor playing for Port Vale (August 2022)

Appearances and goals by club, season and competition
Club	Season	League			FA Cup		League Cup		Other		Total	
Club	Season	Division	Apps	Goals	Apps	Goals	Apps	Goals	Apps	Goals	Apps	Goals
Preston North End	2009–10	Championship	1	0	0	0	0	0	—		1	0
Preston North End	2010–11	Championship	5	1	0	0	0	0	—		5	1
Preston North End	2011–12	League One	31	3	0	0	1	0	2 (Note: Appearances in the Football League Trophy / EFL Trophy)	0	34	3
Preston North End	Total		37	4	0	0	1	0	2	0	40	4
Stockport County (loan)	2010–11	League Two	7	0	0	0	0	0	0	0	7	0
Swansea City	2012–13	Premier League	0	0	0	0	0	0	—		0	0
Shrewsbury Town (loan)	2012–13	League One	2	0	1	0	—		—		3	0
Crawley Town	2012–13	League One	18	7	—		—		—		18	7
Crawley Town	2013–14	League One	44	6	3	1	1	0	1	0	49	7
Crawley Town	Total		62	13	3	1	1	0	1	0	67	14
Fleetwood Town	2014–15	League One	41	8	1	0	1	0	1	0	44	8
Fleetwood Town	2015–16	League One	23	4	1	0	1	0	3	0	28	4
Fleetwood Town	Total		64	12	2	0	2	0	4	0	72	12
Bradford City	2015–16	League One	18	5	—		—		2 (Note: Appearances in the League One play-offs)	1	20	6
Bolton Wanderers	2016–17	League One	21	0	4	0	1	1	3	0	29	1
Carlisle United (loan)	2016–17	League Two	17	4	—		—		2 (Note: Appearances in the League Two play-offs)	0	19	4
Rotherham United	2017–18	League One	4	0	0	0	2	1	0	0	6	1
Rotherham United	2018–19	Championship	16	2	0	0	2	2	—		18	4
Rotherham United	2019–20	League One	3	0	0	0	1	0	1	0	5	0
Rotherham United	2020–21	Championship	0	0	0	0	0	0	—		0	0
Rotherham United	Total		23	2	0	0	5	3	1	0	29	5
Scunthorpe United (loan)	2019–20	League Two	13	1	1	0	—		0	0	14	1
AFC Fylde (loan)	2019–20	National League	8	1	0	0	—		1 (Note: Appearances in the FA Trophy)	0	9	1
Newport County (loan)	2020–21	League Two	10	1	3	1	—		0	0	13	2
Wigan Athletic (loan)	2020–21	League One	15	2	—		—		—		15	2
Port Vale	2021–22	League Two	31	12	0	0	1	1	2	0	34	13
Port Vale	2022–23	League One	20	2	0	0	1	0	0	0	21	2
Port Vale	Total		51	14	0	0	2	1	2	0	55	15
Barrow	2023–24	League Two	24	1	2	0	0	0	1	0	27	1
Southport	2024–25	National League North	32	2	0	0	—		3	1	35	3
Ramsbottom United	2025–26	North West Counties League; Premier Division	2	0	0	0	—		0	0	2	0
Career total			406	62	16	2	12	5	22	2	456	71

== Honours ==
Bolton Wanderers

- EFL League One second-place promotion: 2016–17

Rotherham United

- EFL League One second-place promotion: 2019–20

Port Vale

- EFL League Two play-offs: 2022
