= Darren Campion =

English footballer

Personal information
- Date of birth: 17 October 1988 (age 38)
- Place of birth: Birmingham, England
- Position: Defender

Youth career
- 2003−2007: Birmingham City

Senior career*
Years	Team	Apps	(Gls)
2007−2009	Carlisle United	38	(0)
2008	→ Workington (loan)	1	(0)
2009−2010	Solihull Moors		(?)
2010	Redditch United	3	(1)
2010−2015	Hednesford Town	308	(54)
2015	Worcester City		
2015–2016	AFC Telford United	43	(0)
2017	Hednesford Town	1	(0)
2017	Walsall Wood		
2017–2018	Hednesford Town		
2018–2021	Whitchurch Alport		
- * Club domestic league appearances and goals

Darren Campion (born 17 October 1987) is an English retired footballer who predominantly played at left-back.

== Footballing career ==
Campion started his career as a youth team player at Birmingham City, before being released in 2007 following City's return to the Premier League.

Campion had trials with Shrewsbury Town and Hereford United, but failed to earn a contract with the League Two clubs. Campion then had a trial with League One outfit Carlisle United, where unlike with his two previous trails, impressed Cumbrians manager Greg Abbott, to sign the defender on a short-term contract until December 2007, where he acted as cover for Zigor Aranalde at left-back. Campion impressed in training and reserve games enough to earn a contract until the end of 2007-08 season and he made his Carlisle United début on 26 April 2008 at Millwall as a 59th minute substitute replacing Scott Dobie, Carlisle lost the game 3–0. He was released from his contract by Greg Abbott in January 2009.

He returned to the West Midlands, turning out for Conference North side Solihull Moors in 2009 before finishing the 2009–2010 season at local rivals Redditch United

He joined Hednesford in October 2010, making his debut for the Pitmen in a 2-1 F.A. Trophy defeat to Whitby Town. After biding his time behind fellow left backs Louis Keenan and Aaron Gibson, Campion became an automatic pick for the Pitmen as they charged towards a second-place finish in the Southern League Premier Division, losing in the play-off final to Salisbury City.

The summer of 2011 saw Campion agree a new deal with the Pitmen, and was named as the club's captain by manager Rob Smith. Campion's season was split into two distinct parts; the first half was consistent and confident, the second frustrating and spent on the sidelines suspended, after picking up two red cards in quick succession – both for dissent

Campion agreed a new deal at Hednesford for the 2012-2013 campaign.

On 20 May 2015, Campion signed for National League North side Worcester City. In September 2015, Campion signed for fellow National League North club AFC Telford United.

On 23 May 2016, it was claimed that Campion played for Bilbrook F.C. in the West Midlands League Division Two cup final, which Bilbrook won 2–0, even though Campion was ineligible.

Campion left Hednesford in June 2017, after a change in his work situation. On 22 June 2017, Campion signed for Walsall Wood.
