= 2010–11 Burton Albion F.C. season =

Burton Albion
2010–11 season
- Chairman: Ben Robinson
- Manager: Paul Peschisolido
- League Two: 19th
- FA Cup: Fourth Round (eliminated by Burnley)
- League Cup: First Round (eliminated by Cardiff City)
- FL Trophy: Northern Section East; Second Round (eliminated by Rotherham United)
- Top goalscorer: League: Aaron Webster (11); All: Aaron Webster & Shaun Harrad (13)
- Highest home attendance: 5,236 vs. Middlesbrough, 8 January 2011
- Lowest home attendance: 1,360 vs. Rotherham United, 6 October 2010
- Average home league attendance: 2,948
Home colours	Away colours

This article details Burton Albion F.C.'s 2010–11 season in League Two. This season is The Brewers' second season in The Football League, having finished 13th in the previous campaign. The season also marks the 60th anniversary of the club.

== Events ==
This is a list of the significant events to occur at the club during the 2010–11 season, presented in chronological order (starting from 1 June 2010 and ending on the final day of the club's final match in the 2010–11 season). This list does not include transfers or new contracts, which are listed in the transfers section below, or match results, which are in the fixtures section.

=== June ===
- 4 June: Paul Peschisolido announces that the Brewers' reserve team has been axed in favour of pre-arranged friendly matches.
- 16 June: The fixtures for the League Cup are revealed. Burton will travel to Cardiff City on the week beginning 9 July 2010, later confirmed to be 11 July 2010.
- 17 June: The fixtures for the 2010–11 League Two campaign are revealed. Burton start the season on 7 August at home to Oxford United and will also finish at home to Accrington Stanley on 7 May.

=== July ===
- 1 July: The Brewers announce the opening of the club's Centre Of Excellence. Gareth Holmes is hired to head the centre, alongside new Head Of Scholars Mike Whitlow, and existing youth team coach Mark Sale.
- 2 July: The players return for pre-season training with new faces Darren Moore and Adam Legzdins.
- 5 July: Staffordshire County Council grant the Pirelli Stadium a renewed safety certificate.
- 31 July: The Brewers are handed a bye to head through to the second round of the Northern Section East of the Football League Trophy.

=== August ===
- 3 August: Darren Moore is announced as the new club captain, replacing former captain Darren Stride. The new squad numbers are also announced, with Moore occupying Stride's vacant number 7 shirt.
- 7 August: The League Two season kicks off for the Brewers, culminating in a goalless draw with Oxford United. New captain Darren Moore, Adam Legzdins, Nathan Stanton, Adam Bolder and Lewis Young all make their competitive debuts.
- 12 August: The Brewers are again eliminated from the League Cup at the 1st-round stage, being defeated 4–1 away Cardiff City after extra time.
- 19 August: It is revealed that the Brewers spent £4,960 in agents' fees during the 2009–10 season, the eighth highest in League Two in figures released by The Football League.
- 31 August: The Brewers announce the opening of the Burton Albion Community Trust as a means to deliver programmers within the local community. Andy Taylor is installed as head of the trust.

=== September ===
- 4 September: The Brewers are handed a home tie with Rotherham United in the Football League Trophy. Later that day Aaron Webster makes his 500th appearance for the Brewers in the match against Hereford United. He marks the occasion with two assists contributing to a 3–0 victory over the Bulls. The match also sees Nathan Stanton sidelined for up to six weeks with a hamstring injury.
- 8 September: The Brewers are drawn away to Bedworth United in the first round of the Birmingham Senior Cup.
- 11 September: Shaun Harrad strikes the first hat-trick of the season for the Brewers in a 3–3 draw against Rotherham United. The match also sees the return of Ryan Austin, having been sidelined since November 2009, and the professional debut of Kevin Grocott.

=== October ===
- 4 October: Shaun Harrad is named PFA League Two Fans' Player of the Month for September.
- 4 October: James Ellison is stabbed in the back whilst on a night out in Liverpool city centre. Paul Peschisolido confirms that he has received no major injuries whilst requiring internal and external stitching, and leaves hospital the following day.
- 6 October: The Brewers continue their poor run of results in cup competitions by being eliminated at the first hurdle in the Football League Trophy by Rotherham United.
- 12 October: The Brewers are also eliminated from the Birmingham Senior Cup in the opening round falling victim to Bedworth United.

== Club ==
=== Team kit ===
As with previous seasons, the kit supplier remains Tag Leisure. The club's main sponsor is Mr. Cropper Ltd., who sign a minimum 2-year deal, replacing Roger Bullivant Ltd. who had been the sponsor for the previous three seasons. The club mascot's official shirt sponsors are Raygar Architectural and Engineering Supplies.

=== Players ===
As of 13 October 2010.

No.	Name	Nationality	Position	Date Of Birth (Age)	Previous club	Since	Apps	Goals	Ends	Transfer Fee	Notes
Goalkeepers
1	Kevin Poole^{1}	(England)	GK	21 July 1963 (age 63)	Derby County	2006	133	0	June 2011	Free	
23	Adam Legzdins	(England)	GK	28 November 1986 (age 39)	Crewe Alexandra	2010	11	0	June 2012	Free	
Defenders
2	Paul Boertien	(England)	LB	18 April 1980 (age 46)	Walsall	2009	42	1	June 2011	Free	
3	Aaron Webster	(England)	LB	19 December 1980 (age 45)	Youth	1998	505	88	June 2011	N/A	
4	Nathan Stanton	(England)	CB	4 June 1981 (age 45)	Rochdale	2010	8	0	June 2012	Free	
5	Tony James	(Wales)	CB	9 October 1978 (age 48)	Weymouth	2007	115	1	June 2011	Free	
7	Darren Moore^{2}	(Jamaica)	CB	22 April 1974 (age 52)	Barnsley	2010	8	0	June 2011	Free	
8	Andrew Corbett	(England)	RB	20 February 1982 (age 44)	Nuneaton Borough	2003	290	11	June 2011	Nominal	
15	Ryan Austin	(England)	CB	15 November 1984 (age 42)	Crewe Alexandra	2005	182	6	January 2011	Free	
24	Kevin Grocott	(England)	LB	30 July 1992 (age 34)	Youth	2009	1	0	June 2011	N/A	
27	Richard Jackson	(England)	RB	18 April 1980 (age 46)	Hereford Utd	2009	5	0	June 2011	Free	
Midfielders
6	John McGrath	(Republic of Ireland)	CM	27 March 1980 (age 46)	Tamworth	2007	159	16	June 2011	Free	
11	Keith Gilroy	(Republic of Ireland)	LW/RW	18 July 1983 (age 43)	Darlington	2005	150	17	June 2011	Free	
16	Russell Penn	(England)	CM	8 November 1985 (age 41)	Kidderminster Harriers	2009	56	5	June 2011	20K^{3}	
17	Jimmy Phillips	(England)	LW/RW	20 September 1989 (age 37)	Stoke City	2009	36	2	June 2011	Free	
19	Jacques Maghoma	(Democratic Republic of the Congo)	CM	23 October 1987 (age 39)	Tottenham Hotspur	2009	45	5	June 2011	Free	
21	Garyn Preen	(Wales)	LW/RW	25 October 1991 (age 35)	Southampton	2010	2	0	June 2011	Free	
22	Jack Dyer	(England)	CM	11 December 1991 (age 34)	Aston Villa	2010	1	0	June 2011	Free	
26	Adam Bolder	(England)	CM	25 October 1980 (age 46)	Millwall	2010	8	0	June 2012	Free	
Forwards
9	Shaun Harrad	(England)	FW	11 December 1984 (age 41)	Notts County	2005	236	68	June 2011	Free	
10	Richard Walker	(England)	FW	8 November 1977 (age 49)	Bristol Rovers	2009	30	5	June 2011	Free	
14	James Ellison	(England)	FW	25 October 1991 (age 35)	Liverpool	2010	2	0	June 2012	Free	
18	Greg Pearson	(England)	FW	3 April 1985 (age 41)	Bishops Stortford	2008	97	33	June 2011	Undisclosed	
20	Lewis Young	(England)	FW	27 September 1989 (age 37)	Watford	2010	10	0	June 2011	Free	

Source: Burton Albion
Ordered by position then squad number.
Appearances (starts and substitute appearances) and goals include those in competitive matches in The Football League, The Football Conference, FA Cup, League Cup, Football League Trophy, FA Trophy and Conference League Cup.
^{1}Player/Goalkeeping coach. Oldest registered player in The Football League.
^{2}Club Captain.
^{3}Undisclosed club record transfer fee, reported by Burton Mail to be 20K.

=== Youth team players ===
As of 6 August 2010.

Position	Name	Nationality	Date Of Birth (Age)	Previous club	Notes
GK	Danny Marsh	(England)	27 February 1992 (age 34)	Gresley Rovers	
DF	Jacob Sturgess	(England)	11 June 1992 (age 34)	Moira United	
DF	Rich Wright	(England)	18 June 1993 (age 33)	Ashbourne Town	
DF	Ben Turner	(England)	17 July 1992 (age 34)	AFC Dronfield	
DF	Craig Hill	(England)	11 December 1992 (age 33)	Derby County	
DF	Matthew Blake	(England)	27 November 1991 (age 34)		
DF	Bromley Sibson	(England)	12 February 1991 (age 35)	Belper Town	
DF	Courtney Sowe	(England)	30 October 1992 (age 34)	Coventry City	
DF	Kurtis Angell	(England)	11 April 1993 (age 33)	Chesterfield	
DF	Jamie Edwards	(England)	7 April 1993 (age 33)	Port Vale	
DF	Joshua Ross	(England)	13 September 1991 (age 35)		
MF	Alex Monk	(England)	16 April 1993 (age 33)	Derby County	

Source: Burton Albion
Ordered by position then squad number.

=== Club officials ===
Position	Staff
Chairman	(England) Ben Robinson
Board Of Directors	(England) Frank Spiers (England) Fleur Robinson (England) Phillip Brown (England) Charles Simpson (England) Paul Simpson (England) Rob Brown (England) Ian English (England) Terry Clarke (England) John Williams (England) Colin Brodie
Commercial Manager	(England) Hayley Wright

Last updated 2 August 2010.
Source: Burton Albion | Club | Who's Who
Includes staff currently registered with club only.

=== First-team coaching and medical staff ===
Position	Staff
Manager	(Canada) Paul Peschisolido
Assistant manager	(England) Gary Rowett
Player/Goalkeeping Coach	(England) Kevin Poole
Youth Team Manager	(England) Mark Sale

Last updated 2 August 2010.
Source: Burton Albion | Team | Management
Includes staff currently registered with club only.

=== Other staff ===
Position	Staff
Head of Centre Of Excellence	(England) Gareth Holmes
Head of Scholars	(England) Mike Whitlow
Head of Community Trust	(England) Andy Taylor
Kit Man	(England) Ray 'Rocky' Hudson
Groundsman	(England) Simon Marshall
Press Officer	(England) Ben Eagling

Last updated 10 September 2010.
Source: Burton Albion
Includes staff currently registered with club only.

=== Former staff ===
Position	Staff	Date	Reason	Source
Head physio	(England) Steve Walker	29 June 2010	Transferred to Tranmere Rovers	
Chief scout	(England) Glyn Chamberlain	6 July 2010	Transferred to Macclesfield Town	

Ordered by date left club.

=== Other information ===
Mascots	Billy Brewer and Bettie Brewer
Ground (capacity and dimensions)	Pirelli Stadium (6,912 / 110x72m)

Updated to match played 2 August 2010
Source: Burton Albion, Soccer Voice

== Fixtures ==
Legend

Win	Draw	Loss

=== Pre-season friendlies ===
10 July 2010	Ilkeston Town	1–2	Burton Albion	Ilkeston
15:00 BST	Ryan 59'	(Report)	Bossekota 34'; Dyer 43'	Stadium: New Manor Ground; Attendance: 416

13 July 2010	Mickleover Sports	2–5	Burton Albion	Mickleover
19:45 BST	McGrath 15' (o.g.); Ashton 52'	(Report)	Franklin 48'; Penn 55'; Ellison 65'; Harrad 73'; Young 79'	Stadium: Mickleover Sports Ground

17 July 2010	Burton Albion	0–1	Derby County	Burton upon Trent
15:00 BST		(Report)	Leacock 26'	Stadium: Pirelli Stadium; Attendance: 3,133

20 July 2010	Burton Albion	1–0	Sheffield United	Burton upon Trent
19:45 BST	Greg Pearson 16'	(Report)		Stadium: Pirelli Stadium; Attendance: 1,358

24 July 2010	Burton Albion	4–2	West Ham United	Burton upon Trent
15:00 BST	Bolder 12'; Webster 15'; McGrath 52'; Harrad 86'	(Report)	Abdullah 3'; Yao 45'	Stadium: Pirelli Stadium; Attendance: 1,920

27 July 2010	Solihull Moors	0–1	Burton Albion	Solihull
19:45 BST		(Report)	Webster 6'	Stadium: Damson Park

28 July 2010	Burton Albion	1–3	Derby County	Burton upon Trent
19:45 BST	Ellison 53' (pen.)	(Report)	Varney 61', 64'; Martin 67'	Stadium: Pirelli Stadium; Attendance: 1018

31 July 2010	Kidderminster Harriers	1–0	Burton Albion	Kidderminster
15:00 BST	Shaw 11' (pen.)	(Report)		Stadium: Aggborough; Attendance: 544

=== League Two ===
==== Results ====
7 August 2010	Burton Albion	0–0	Oxford United	Burton upon Trent
15:00 BST		(Report)		Stadium: Pirelli Stadium; Attendance: 4,321; Referee: Craig Pawson

14 August 2010	Barnet	0–0	Burton Albion	Barnet
15:00 BST		(Report)		Stadium: Underhill Stadium; Attendance: 1,655; Referee: Mick Russell

21 August 2010	Burton Albion	3–2	Morecambe	Burton upon Trent
15:00 BST	Webster 1'; Webster 75'; Pearson 81' (pen.)	(Report)	Fleming 8'; Fleming 51'	Stadium: Pirelli Stadium; Attendance: 2,072; Referee: Gary Sutton

28 August 2010	Cheltenham Town	2–1	Burton Albion	Cheltenham
15:00 BST	Thomas 80'; Low 82'	(Report)	Harrad 36'	Stadium: Whaddon Road; Attendance: 3,221; Referee: Roger East

4 September 2010	Burton Albion	3–0	Hereford United	Burton upon Trent
15:00 BST	Walker 27'; Harrad 31'; Penn 47'	(Report)		Stadium: Pirelli Stadium; Attendance: 2,556; Referee: Darren Sheldrake

11 September 2010	Rotherham United	3–3	Burton Albion	Sheffield
15:00 BST	Ellison 1'; Cresswell 34'; Le Fondre 38'	(Report)	Harrad 46', 62' (pen.), 83'	Stadium: Don Valley Stadium; Attendance: 3,516; Referee: Graham Salisbury

18 September 2010	Burton Albion	1–1	Crewe Alexandra	Burton upon Trent
15:00 BST	Maghoma 44'	(Report)	Murphy 63'	Stadium: Pirelli Stadium; Attendance: 3,093; Referee: Mark Brown

25 September 2010	Gillingham	1–0	Burton Albion	Gillingham
15:00 BST	Cody McDonald 50'	(Report)		Stadium: Priestfield Stadium; Attendance: 4,823; Referee: R. Lewis

28 September 2010	Lincoln City	0–0	Burton Albion	Lincoln
19:45 BST		(Report)		Stadium: Sincil Bank; Attendance: 2,510; Referee: P. Miller

2 October 2010	Burton Albion	2–1	Stockport County	Burton upon Trent
15:00 BST	Webster 64'; Webster 68'	(Report)	Turnbull 19'	Stadium: Pirelli Stadium; Attendance: 3,107; Referee: A. Woolmer

9 October 2010	Burton Albion	1–2	Wycombe Wanderers	Burton upon Trent
15:00	Harrad 50'		Ainsworth 16'; Sandell 41'	Stadium: Pirelli Stadium; Attendance: 3,042; Referee: Mark Haywood

16 October 2010	Stevenage	2–1	Burton Albion	Stevenage
15:00	Laird 34' (pen.); Holroyd 58'; Foster (red card) 70'		Webster 48'	Stadium: Broadhall Way; Attendance: 2,550; Referee: Trevor Kettle

23 October 2010	Burton Albion	3–0	Bradford City	Burton upon Trent
15:00	Harrad 31' (pen.); Collins 54'; Penn 88'			Stadium: Pirelli Stadium; Attendance: 3,143; Referee: Malone

30 October 2010	Macclesfield Town	2–1	Burton Albion	Macclesfield
15:00	Bencherif 29', 48'		Collins 63'	Stadium: Moss Rose; Attendance: 1,791; Referee: Penn

2 November 2010	Burton Albion	0–0	Port Vale	Burton upon Trent
19:45				Stadium: Pirelli Stadium; Attendance: 4,027; Referee: Peter Quinn

13 November 2010	Chesterfield	1–2	Burton Albion	Chesterfield
15:00	Niven 44' (red card) 60'	BBC Report; BAFC Report	Collins 5'; Harrad 82'	Stadium: b2net Stadium; Attendance: 7,864; Referee: Lee Mason

19 November 2010	Burton Albion	1–3	Bury	Burton upon Trent
19:45	Collins 29'	BBC Report; BAFC Report	Jones 10'; Ajose 53'; Sodje 73'	Stadium: Pirelli Stadium; Attendance: 2,738; Referee: G. Scott

23 November 2010	Burton Albion	1–2	Aldershot Town	Burton upon Trent
19:45	Harrad 45'	BBC Report; BAFC Report	Small 16', 26'	Stadium: Pirelli Stadium; Attendance: 1,904; Referee: Scott Mathieson

11 December 2010	Burton Albion	3–1	Southend United	Burton upon Trent
15:00	Maghoma 37'; Prosser 45' (o.g.); Webster 57'	BBC Report; BAFC Report	Sturrock 51'	Stadium: Pirelli Stadium; Attendance: 2,604; Referee: Williamson

1 January 2011	Burton Albion	0–0	Shrewsbury Town	Burton upon Trent
15:00		BBC Report; BAFC Report		Stadium: Pirelli Stadium; Attendance: 3,594; Referee: Oliver Langford

3 January 2011	Port Vale	2–1	Burton Albion	Burslem
15:00	McCombe 4'; J. Richards 6'; M. Richards (yellow card) 23' (yellow-red card) 63'	BBC Report; BAFC Report	Harrad 60'	Stadium: Vale Park; Attendance: 5,681; Referee: M. Naylor

1 February 2011	Shrewsbury Town	3–0	Burton Albion	Shrewsbury
19:45	J. Taylor 55', 70'; Harrold 72'	BBC Report; BAFC Report		Stadium: Greenhous Meadow; Attendance: 4,343; Referee: Mick Russell

11 February 2011	Burton Albion	1–0	Chesterfield	Burton upon Trent
19:45	Webster 5'	BBC Report; BAFC Report		Stadium: Pirelli Stadium; Attendance: 4,260; Referee: Darren Sheldrake

15 February 2011	Torquay United	1–0	Burton Albion	Torquay
19:45	Robertson 56'	BBC Report; BAFC Report		Stadium: Plainmoor; Attendance: 1,602; Referee: Karl Evans

19 February 2011	Hereford United	0–0	Burton Albion	Hereford
15:00	Kovacs (yellow card) 43' (yellow-red card) 54'	BBC Report; BAFC Report	Penn (yellow card) 14' (yellow-red card) 24'	Stadium: Edgar Street; Attendance: 2,773; Referee: Mark Brown

22 February 2011	Wycombe Wanderers	4–1	Burton Albion	High Wycombe
19:45	Lewis 10', 40'; Montrose 30'; Rendell 63' (pen.)	BBC Report; BAFC Report	Winnall 56'	Stadium: Adams Park; Attendance: 3,345; Referee: Oliver Langford

26 February 2011	Burton Albion	2–4	Rotherham United	Burton upon Trent
15:00	Pearson 2'; Webster 34'	BBC Report; BAFC Report	Mullins 6'; Marshall 75'; Le Fondre 89'; Taylor 90+5'	Stadium: Pirelli Stadium; Attendance: 3,596; Referee: Graham Horwood

1 March 2011	Northampton Town	2–3	Burton Albion	Northampton
19:45	Johnson 45+1'; Holt 61'	BBC Report; BAFC Report	Corbett 27'; McGrath 37'; Dunn 39' (o.g.)	Stadium: Sixfields Stadium; Attendance: 3,423; Referee: Nigel Miller

5 March 2011	Crewe Alexandra	4–1	Burton Albion	Crewe
15:00	Donaldson 2', 27' (pen.), 90+2'; Miller 7'	BBC Report; BAFC Report	Winnall 83'	Stadium: Alexandra Stadium; Attendance: 3,882; Referee: Colin Webster

8 March 2011	Burton Albion	3–1	Lincoln City	Burton upon Trent
19:45	Winnall 11', 75' (pen.); Webster 48'	BBC Report; BAFC Report	Grimes 82'	Stadium: Pirelli Stadium; Attendance: 2,051; Referee: Mark Haywood

12 March 2011	Stockport County	0–0	Burton Albion	Stockport
15:00		BBC Report; BAFC Report		Stadium: Edgeley Park; Attendance: 4,278; Referee: Graham Salisbury

15 March 2011	Accrington Stanley	3–1	Burton Albion	Accrington
19:45	Edwards 43'; Craney 48'; Procter 67'	BBC Report; BAFC Report	Pearson 88'	Stadium: Crown Ground; Attendance: 1,445; Referee: Eddie Ilderton

19 March 2011	Burton Albion	1–1	Gillingham	Burton upon Trent
15:00	Winnall 26'	BBC Report; BAFC Report	McDonald 78'	Stadium: Pirelli Stadium; Attendance: 3,230; Referee: David Coote

22 March 2011	Burton Albion	0–2	Stevenage	Burton upon Trent
19:45		BBC Report; BAFC Report	Mousinho 4', 88' (pen.)	Stadium: Pirelli Stadium; Attendance: 1,962; Referee: Rob Shoebridge

27 March 2011	Oxford United	3–0	Burton Albion	Oxford
15:00	MacLean 5', 90'; Craddock 57' (pen.)	BBC Report; BAFC Report	Moore (red card) 56'; Parkes (red card) 77'	Stadium: Kassam Stadium; Attendance: 7,127; Referee: Danny McDermid

30 March 2011	Burton Albion	3–2	Macclesfield Town	Burton upon Trent
19:45	Zola 43'; Bolder 86'; Winnall 89' (pen.)		Sinclair 1', 81'	Stadium: Pirelli Stadium; Attendance: 1,974; Referee: Simon Hooper

2 April 2011	Burton Albion	1–4	Barnet	Burton upon Trent
15:00	Winnall 11'	BBC Report; BAFC Report	Kabba 53', 64', 67' (pen.), 79'	Stadium: Pirelli Stadium; Attendance: 2,774; Referee: Craig Pawson

5 April 2011	Burton Albion	1–1	Northampton Town	Burton upon Trent
19:45	Webster 43'	BBC Report; BAFC Report	Bauzà 39'	Stadium: Pirelli Stadium; Attendance: 2,536; Referee: Darren Drysdale

9 April 2011	Morecambe	2–1	Burton Albion	Morecambe
15:00	McCready 14'; Carlton 67'	BBC Report; BAFC Report	Maghoma 78'	Stadium: Globe Arena; Attendance: 1,877; Referee: Karl Evans

12 April 2011	Bury	1–0	Burton Albion	Bury
19:45	Lees 77'; Mozika (red card) 45+2'; Sodje (red card) 87'	BBC Report; BAFC Report	Winnall (red card) 82'	Stadium: Gigg Lane; Attendance: 1,877; Referee: Nigel Miller

16 April 2011	Burton Albion	2–0	Cheltenham Town	Burton upon Trent
15:00	Pearson 31' (pen.); Maghoma 79'	BBC Report; BAFC Report	Gallinagh (red card) 30'	Stadium: Pirelli Stadium; Attendance: 2,444; Referee: D. Foster

19 April 2011	Bradford City	1–1	Burton Albion	Bradford
19:45	Speight 74'	BBC Report; BAFC Report	McGrath 42'	Stadium: Valley Parade; Attendance: 13,814; Referee: Neil Swarbrick

23 April 2011	Aldershot Town	1–2	Burton Albion	Aldershot
15:00	Spencer 26'	BBC Report; BAFC Report	Webster 12'; Zola 74'	Stadium: Recreation Ground; Attendance: 2,308; Referee: Gavin Ward

25 April 2011	Burton Albion	3–3	Torquay United	Burton upon Trent
15:00	McGrath 26'; Pearson 41'; Zola 56'	BBC Report; BAFC Report	Zebroski 10'; Tomlin 14'; Kee 73'	Stadium: Pirelli Stadium; Attendance: 3,280; Referee: D. Webb

30 April 2011	Southend United	1–1	Burton Albion	Southend-on-Sea
15:00	Corr 3'; Sawyer (yellow card) 81' (yellow-red card) 90+3'	BBC Report; BAFC Report	Malone 28'; Maghoma (red card) 85'	Stadium: Roots Hall; Attendance: 5,730; Referee: Bobby Madley

7 May 2011	Burton Albion	1–1	Accrington Stanley	Burton upon Trent
15:00	Penn 46'	BBC Report	Winnard 84'	Stadium: Pirelli Stadium; Attendance: 3,491; Referee: Mark Haywood

==== League table ====
Pos	Team	Pld	W	D	L	GF	GA	GD	Pts
17	Cheltenham Town	46	13	13	20	56	77	−21	52
18	Bradford City	46	15	7	24	43	68	−25	52
19	Burton Albion	46	12	15	19	56	70	−14	51
20	Morecambe	46	13	12	21	54	73	−19	51
21	Hereford United	46	12	17	17	50	66	−16	50 (Note: Torquay United deducted one point and Hereford United deducted three points)

Updated to match(es) played on 28 May 2011. Source: The Football League
Rules for classification: 1) points; 2) goal difference; 3) number of goals scored.

==== League Two Results summary ====
Overall								Home						Away					
Pld	W	D	L	GF	GA	GD	Pts	W	D	L	GF	GA	GD	W	D	L	GF	GA	GD
46	12	15	19	56	70	−14	51	9	8	6	36	31	+5	3	7	13	20	39	−19

Last updated: 18 May 2011.
Source: Burton Albion F.C.

==== Results by round ====
Round	1	2	3	4	5	6	7	8	9	10	11	12	13	14	15	16	17	18	19	20	21	22	23	24	25	26	27	28	29	30	31	32	33	34	35	36	37	38	39	40	41	42	43	44	45	46
Ground	H	A	H	A	H	A	H	A	A	H	H	A	H	A	H	A	H	H	H	H	A	A	H	A	A	A	H	A	A	H	A	A	H	H	A	H	H	H	A	A	H	A	A	H	A	H
Result	D	D	W	L	W	D	D	L	D	W	L	L	W	L	D	W	L	L	W	D	L	L	W	L	D	L	L	W	L	W	D	L	D	L	L	W	L	D	L	L	W	D	W	D	D	D
Position	16	15	8	11	6	8	7	10	13	10	12	14	13	14	14	12	12	13	12	15	17	22	21	22	22	22	23	22	22	22	22	22	22	22	22	22	22	22	22	22	22	21	17	19	19	19

Updated to match(es) played on 18 May 2011. Source: Burton Albion F.C.
A = Away; H = Home; W = Win; D = Draw; L = Loss

=== FA Cup ===
7 Nov 2010 First round	Burton Albion	1–0	Oxford United	Burton upon Trent
15:00 GMT	Webster 86'	BBC Report; BAFC Report		Stadium: Pirelli Stadium; Attendance: 2,483; Referee: Gary Sutton

27 Nov 2010 Second round	Burton Albion	3–1	Chesterfield	Burton upon Trent
15:00 GMT	Webster 12'; Maghoma 22'; Collins 90+4'	BBC Report; BAFC Report	Bowery 83'	Stadium: Pirelli Stadium; Attendance: 4,682; Referee: Mark Brown

8 Jan 2011 Third round	Burton Albion	2–1	Middlesbrough	Burton upon Trent
15:00 GMT	Harrad 82', 90+4'	BBC Report; BAFC Report	O'Neil 58'	Stadium: Pirelli Stadium; Attendance: 5,236; Referee: Steve Tanner

29 Jan 2011 Fourth round	Burnley	3–1	Burton Albion	Burnley
19:45 GMT	Eagles 29', 70'; Paterson 90'	BBC Report; BAFC Report	Zola 80'	Stadium: Turf Moor; Attendance: 11,664; Referee: Jon Moss

=== League Cup ===
11 August 2010 First round	Cardiff City	4–1 (a.e.t.)	Burton Albion	Cardiff
19:45 BST	Bothroyd 17'; McCormack 107', 110'; Chopra 118'	BBC Report; BAFC Report	Harrad 19'	Stadium: Cardiff City Stadium; Attendance: 6,080; Referee: Mick Russell

=== Football League Trophy ===
6 October 2010 Second round	Burton Albion	1–2	Rotherham United	Burton upon Trent
19:30 BST	Walker 83'	BBC Report; BAFC Report	Bradley 65'; Ellison 79' (pen.)	Stadium: Pirelli Stadium; Attendance: 1,360; Referee: Russell Booth

=== Birmingham Senior Cup ===
12 October 2010 First round	Bedworth United	4–2	Burton Albion	Bedworth
19:45 BST	Rathbone 30'; Stanley 55' (pen.); Ramsey 68'; Ramsey 83'	BAFC Report	Seaton 23'; Halford 85'	Stadium: The Oval; Referee: R. Patterson

== Squad statistics ==
=== Player details ===
As of 8 May 2011. Competitive matches only. Birmingham Senior Cup matches excluded.

No.	Pos.	Name	League		FA Cup		League Cup		FL Trophy		Total		Discipline	
No.	Pos.	Name	Apps	Goals	Apps	Goals	Apps	Goals	Apps	Goals	Apps	Goals	Yellow card	Red card
1	GK	(England) Kevin Poole	0	0	0	0	0	0	1	0	1	0	0	0
2	DF	(England) Paul Boertien	15 (1)	0	0	0	1	0	1	0	17 (1)	0	1	0
3	DF	(England) Aaron Webster	38 (4)	11	3 (1)	2	1	0	0	0	43 (5)	13	3	0
4	DF	(England) Nathan Stanton	23	0	4	0	1	0	1	0	29	0	8	0
5	DF	(Wales) Tony James	25 (2)	0	1 (1)	0	1	0	0	0	27 (3)	0	2	0
6	MF	(Republic of Ireland) John McGrath	38 (3)	3	4	0	1	0	0	0	43 (3)	3	12	0
7	DF	(Jamaica) Darren Moore	32 (2)	0	3	0	0	0	0	0	35 (3)	0	9	1
8	DF	(England) Andrew Corbett	36 (4)	1	2	0	0	0	1	0	39 (4)	1	3	0
9	FW	(England) Shaun Harrad	16 (4)	10	2	2	1	1	0	0	19 (4)	13	3	0
9	MF	(England) Simon Whaley	1 (2)	0	0	0	0	0	0	0	1 (2)	0	1	0
10	FW	(England) Richard Walker	9 (9)	1	2	0	0	0	0 (1)	1	11 (10)	2	1	0
11	MF	(Republic of Ireland) Keith Gilroy	0 (1)	0	0 (1)	0	0	0	0 (1)	0	0 (3)	0	0	0
14	FW	(England) James Ellison	0 (2)	0	0	0	0 (1)	0	0	0	0 (3)	0	0	0
15	DF	(England) Ryan Austin	20 (4)	0	2 (1)	0	0	0	1	0	23 (5)	0	4	0
16	MF	(England) Russell Penn	39 (2)	3	4	0	1	0	1	0	45 (2)	3	10	1
17	MF	(England) Jimmy Phillips	10 (13)	0	0 (2)	0	0 (1)	0	1	0	11 (16)	0	0	0
18	FW	(England) Greg Pearson	16 (19)	5	0 (2)	0	1	0	1	0	18 (21)	5	2	0
19	MF	(Democratic Republic of the Congo) Jacques Maghoma	39 (2)	4	4	1	0	0	0	0	43 (2)	5	0	1
20	FW	(England) Lewis Young	9 (10)	0	0 (1)	0	1	0	1	0	11 (11)	0	1	0
21	MF	(Wales) Garyn Preen	0 (1)	0	0	0	0 (1)	0	1	0	1 (2)	0	0	0
22	MF	(England) Jack Dyer	4 (1)	0	0	0	0	0	0 (1)	0	4 (2)	0	1	0
23	GK	(England) Adam Legzdins	46	0	4	0	1	0	0	0	51	0	1	0
24	DF	(England) Kevin Grocott	0 (2)	0	0	0	0	0	0	0	0 (2)	0	0	0
25	FW	(Republic of Ireland) James Collins	9 (1)	4	2	1	0	0	0	0	11 (1)	5	1	0
25	DF	(England) Tom Parkes	4 (1)	0	0	0	0	0	0	0	4 (1)	0	0	1
26	MF	(England) Adam Bolder	32 (5)	1	4	0	1	0	1	0	38 (5)	1	6	0
27	DF	(England) Richard Jackson	0	0	0	0	0	0	0	0	0	0	0	0
28	DF	(England) Scott Malone	18 (4)	1	4	0	0	0	0	0	22 (4)	1	4	0
29	FW	(England) Sam Winnall	12 (7)	7	0	0	0	0	0	0	12 (7)	7	0	1
30	FW	(England) Nialle Rodney	0 (3)	0	0	0	0	0	0	0	0 (3)	0	0	0
32	MF	(England) Bryan Hughes	1	0	0	0	0	0	0	0	1	0	0	0
32	FW	(Democratic Republic of the Congo) Calvin Zola	14 (4)	3	1	1	0	0	0	0	15 (4)	4	1	0

== Transfers ==
Players transferred in
Date	Pos.	Name	From	Fee	Ref.
7 May 2010	DF	(Jamaica) Darren Moore	(England) Barnsley	Free	
1 July 2010	GK	(England) Adam Legzdins	(England) Crewe Alexandra	Free (Bosman)	
5 July 2010	FW	(England) James Ellison	(England) Liverpool	Free	
5 July 2010	DF	(England) Nathan Stanton	(England) Rochdale	Free (Bosman)	
22 July 2010	MF	(England) Adam Bolder	(England) Millwall	Free	
23 July 2010	MF	(Wales) Garyn Preen	(England) Southampton	Free	
23 July 2010	MF	(England) Jack Dyer	(England) Aston Villa	Free	
23 July 2010	MF	(England) Lewis Young	(England) Watford	Free	
22 October 2010	GK	(England) Kyle Clancy	(England) Sheffield	Free	
15 December 2010	MF	(England) Bryan Hughes	(England) Hull City	Free	
5 March 2011	MF	(England) Simon Whaley	(England) Doncaster Rovers	Free	
Players loaned in
Date from	Pos.	Name	From	Date to	Ref.
15 October 2010	FW	(Republic of Ireland) James Collins	(England) Aston Villa	7 January 2011	
22 October 2010	DF	(England) Scott Malone	(England) Wolverhampton Wanderers	End of season	
18 January 2011	FW	(Democratic Republic of the Congo) Calvin Zola	(England) Crewe Alexandra	End of season	
10 February 2011	FW	(England) Sam Winnall	(England) Wolverhampton Wanderers	End of season	
8 March 2011	FW	(England) Nialle Rodney	(England) Nottingham Forest	7 April 2011	
24 March 2011	DF	(England) Tom Parkes	(England) Leicester City	End of season	
Players loaned out
Date from	Pos.	Name	To	Date to	Ref.
1 October 2010	DF	(Wales) Tony James	(England) Hereford United	2 November 2010	
26 November 2010	FW	(England) James Ellison	(England) Stafford Rangers	26 December 2010	
26 November 2010	MF	(Wales) Garyn Preen	(England) Stafford Rangers	26 December 2010	
31 January 2011	DF	(England) Kevin Grocott	(England) Vauxhall Motors	2 March 2011	
18 March 2011	FW	(England) James Ellison	(England) Hednesford Town	End of season	
Players transferred out
Date	Pos.	Name	Subsequent club	Fee	Ref.
20 January 2011	FW	(England) Shaun Harrad	(England) Northampton Town	£35,000	
Players released
Date	Pos.	Name	Subsequent club	Join date	Ref.
1 July 2010	MF	(England) Michael Simpson	(England) Eastwood Town	10 July 2010	
1 July 2010	DF	(England) Shaun Kelly	(Wales) Bala Town	18 July 2010	
1 July 2010	FW	(England) James Knowles	(England) Matlock Town	29 July 2010	
1 July 2010	FW	(Benin) Romuald Boco	(Republic of Ireland) Sligo Rovers	30 July 2010	
1 July 2010	MF	(England) Marc Goodfellow	(England) Barrow	2 August 2010	
1 July 2010	DF	(England) Darren Stride	(England) Alfreton Town	9 August 2010	
21 July 2010	DF	(England) Guy Branston	(England) Torquay United	21 July 2010	
14 January 2011	MF	(England) Bryan Hughes	(England) Grimsby Town	31 January 2011 (Bosman)	
24 March 2011	MF	(England) Simon Whaley	Unattached		
25 March 2011	DF	(England) Kevin Grocott	(England) Vauxhall Motors	25 March 2011	

=== New Contracts ===
Date	N	Pos.	Country	Name	Age	Status	Contract length	Ends	Ref
10 May 2010	1	GK	(England)	Kevin Poole	46	Signed	1 year	June 2011	
10 May 2010	2	DF	(England)	Paul Boertien	31	Signed	1 year	June 2011	
10 May 2010	8	DF	(England)	Andrew Corbett	28	Signed	1 year	June 2011	
11 May 2010	24	DF	(England)	Kevin Grocott	18	Signed	1 year	June 2011	
10 July 2010	15	DF	(England)	Ryan Austin	25	Signed	Month-by-Month ^{2}	N/A	
15 July 2010	3	DF	(England)	Aaron Webster	29	Signed	1 year ^{1}	June 2011	

^{1}Includes a one-year extension based on appearances.
^{2}Includes optional one-year contract based on recovery.
