= 2014–15 Crawley Town F.C. season =

Crawley Town
2014–15 season
- Chairman: Dave Pottinger
- Manager: John Gregory (until 27 December); Dean Saunders (interim, from 27 December)
- League One: 22nd (relegated)
- FA Cup: First round (eliminated by Yeovil Town)
- League Cup: Second round (eliminated by Norwich City)
- Football League Trophy: Third round (eliminated by Gillingham)
- Top goalscorer: League: All: Izale McLeod (21)
- Highest home attendance: 5,744 vs Coventry City, League One, 3 May 2015
- Lowest home attendance: 1,252 vs Cambridge United, Football League Trophy, 2 September 2014
- Average home league attendance: 2,709
Home colours	Away colours

The 2014–15 season was the 65th season in which Crawley Town played senior football, and the 9th as a fully professional team. Crawley Town competed in Football League One, the third tier of English football, following automatic promotion from League Two during the 2011–12 season.

== Season summary ==
The 2014–15 season saw Crawley struggle for form, and Gregory resigned for health reasons near the end of 2014, with the club in the relegation zone. Dean Saunders was appointed to replace him on an interim basis, and despite an upturn in form, was unable to get the club out of trouble. On Sunday 3 May 2015, Crawley were relegated to League Two, following a 1–2 defeat at home to Coventry City. Saunders' short-term deal was not renewed after the season ended, and he was replaced by Mark Yates.

== First team squad ==
As of 4 May 2015
Players' ages are as of 1 August 2014.

No.	Name	Nat	Date of birth (Age)	Place of birth	Signed from	Note
Goalkeepers
1	Brian Jensen	(Denmark)	8 June 1975 (aged 39)	Copenhagen	Bury	
25	Jamie Ashdown	(England)	30 November 1980 (aged 33)	Reading	Leeds United	released in November 2014
25	Raphael Spiegel	(Switzerland)	19 December 1992 (aged 21)	Rüttenen	on loan from West Ham United	
27	Scott Dutton	(England)	27 October 1995 (aged 18)	Coventry	on loan from Wolverhampton Wanderers	
27	Evandro Rachoni	(Brazil)	24 November 1989 (aged 24)		Concord Rangers	
27/30	Lewis Price	(Wales)	19 July 1984 (aged 30)	Bournemouth	on loan from Crystal Palace	
Defenders
2	Lanre Oyebanjo	(Republic of Ireland)	27 April 1990 (aged 24)	Hackney	York City	
3	Ryan Dickson	(England)	14 December 1986 (aged 27)	Saltash	Colchester United	
5	Dean Leacock	(England)	10 June 1984 (aged 30)	Croydon	Notts County	
6	Sonny Bradley	(England)	13 September 1991 (aged 22)	Hull	Portsmouth	
12	Joe Walsh	(Wales)	13 May 1992 (aged 22)	Cardiff	Swansea City	
16	Connor Essam	(England)	9 July 1992 (aged 22)	Sheerness	Gillingham	released in September 2014
16	Keith Keane	(Republic of Ireland)	20 November 1986 (aged 27)	Luton	on loan from Preston North End	
25	Darren Ward	(England)	13 September 1978 (aged 35)	Kenton	on loan from Swindon Town	
29	Richard Wood	(England)	5 July 1985 (aged 29)	Ossett	on loan from Rotherham United	
32	Kelly Youga	(Central African Republic)	22 September 1985 (aged 28)	Bangui	Qingdao Hainiu	
Midfielders
4	Conor Henderson	(Republic of Ireland)	8 September 1991 (aged 22)	Sidcup	Hull City	
7	Gwion Edwards	(Wales)	1 March 1993 (aged 21)	Lampeter	Swansea City	
8	Jimmy Smith	(England)	7 January 1987 (aged 27)	Newham	Stevenage	
10	Josh Wright	(England)	6 November 1989 (aged 24)	Bethnal Green	on loan from Millwall	
11	Josh Simpson	(England)	6 March 1987 (aged 27)	Harlow	Peterborough United	
14	Lewis Young	(England)	27 September 1989 (aged 24)	Stevenage	Bury	
15	Charles Banya	(England)	18 September 1993 (aged 20)	Lambeth	Fulham	
16	Lee Fowler	(Wales)	10 June 1983 (aged 31)	Cardiff	on loan from Nuneaton Town	
17	Blair Anderson	(England)	1 July 1992 (aged 22)		Basford United	
17	Mitch Rose	(England)	4 July 1994 (aged 20)	Doncaster	on loan from Rotherham United	
20	Bobson Bawling	(England)	21 September 1995 (aged 18)	Islington	Watford	
22	Emmett O'Connor	(Canada)	13 September 1992 (aged 21)	Ajax	none	
23	Ryan Richefond	(England)	16 June 1996 (aged 18)	Tower Hamlets	none	
24	Bradley Isaacs	(England)	2 December 1995 (aged 18)	Crawley	none	
26	Anthony Wordsworth	(England)	3 January 1989 (aged 25)	Camden	on loan from Ipswich Town	
33	Marvin Elliott	(Jamaica)	15 September 1984 (aged 29)	Wandsworth	Bristol City	
Forwards
9	Izale McLeod	(England)	15 October 1984 (aged 29)	Perry Barr	Milton Keynes Dons	
10	Dean Morgan	(England)	3 October 1983 (aged 30)	Edmonton	on loan from Woking	
17	Shaun Miller	(England)	25 September 1987 (aged 26)	Alsager	on loan from Coventry City	
18	Matt Harrold	(England)	25 July 1984 (aged 30)	Leyton	Bristol Rovers	
21	Gavin Tomlin	(England)	21 August 1983 (aged 30)	Gillingham	Port Vale	
28	Mathias Pogba	(Guinea)	19 August 1990 (aged 23)	Conakry	Pescara	
31	John Cofie	(England)	21 January 1993 (aged 21)	Aboso	Molde	

== Match details ==
=== Pre-season friendlies ===
Friendly match details
Date	Time	Opponent	Venue	Result F–A	Scorers	Attendance	Ref.
19 July 2014	15:00	Fulham	Home	0–2		3,390	
23 July 2014	19:45	Brighton & Hove Albion	Home	1–1	John 14'	2,874	
26 July 2014	15:00	Eastleigh	Away	3–3	Tomlin 13', 44', Young 37'		
28 July 2014	19:45	Three Bridges	Away	2–1	Stewart 50', Burford 90+1'		
30 July 2014	19:45	Woking	Away	2–1	McLeod 34' pen., O'Connor 70'	437	
2 August 2014	15:00	Chelsea XI	Home	2–3	Simpson 34', McLeod 44'	1,508	

=== League One ===
==== League table ====
Pos	Team	Pld	W	D	L	GF	GA	GD	Pts	Promotion, qualification or relegation
20	Crewe Alexandra	46	14	10	22	43	75	−32	52	
21	Notts County (R)	46	12	14	20	45	63	−18	50	Relegation to Football League Two
22	Crawley Town (R)	46	13	11	22	53	79	−26	50	Relegation to Football League Two
23	Leyton Orient (R)	46	12	13	21	59	69	−10	49	Relegation to Football League Two
24	Yeovil Town (R)	46	10	10	26	36	75	−39	40	Relegation to Football League Two

Updated to match(es) played on 3 May 2015. Source: BBC Sport
Rules for classification: 1) Points; 2) Goal difference; 3) Number of goals scored
(R) Relegated

==== Matches ====
The fixtures for the 2014–15 season were announced on 18 June 2014 at 9am.

League One match details
Date	Time	Opponent	Venue	Result F–A	Scorers	Attendance	Referee	Ref.
9 August 2014	15:00	Barnsley	Away	1–0	McLeod 82'	10,105	Simpson	
16 August 2014	15:00	Swindon Town	Home	1–0	McLeod 51' pen.	2,710	Linington	
19 August 2014	19:45	Bradford City	Home	1–3	Walsh 54'	2,225	Berry	
23 August 2014	15:00	Sheffield United	Away	0–1		18,178	D'Urso	
30 August 2014	15:00	Milton Keynes Dons	Away	0–2		7,148	Heywood	
6 September 2014	15:00	Rochdale	Home	0–4		2,534	Scott	
13 September 2014	15:00	Fleetwood Town	Home	1–0	McLeod 78'	1,905	Malone	
16 September 2014	19:45	Doncaster Rovers	Away	0–0		5,197	Ilderton	
20 September 2014	15:00	Preston North End	Away	0–2		10,388	Wright	
27 September 2014	15:00	Yeovil Town	Home	2–0	Elliott 57', 59'	2,351	Breakspear	
4 October 2014	15:00	Coventry City	Away	2–2	Edwards 33', McLeod 37'	7,708	Salisbury	
11 October 2014	15:00	Peterborough United	Home	1–4	McLeod 2'	2,832	Bull	
18 October 2014	15:00	Notts County	Away	3–5	Edwards 50', Harrold 55', Elliott 84'	6,086	Bankes	
21 October 2014	19:45	Walsall	Home	1–0	Henderson 89'	2,204	Stroud	
25 October 2014	15:00	Gillingham	Away	1–1	Edwards 29'	4,850	Kavanagh	
1 November 2014	15:00	Crewe Alexandra	Home	1–1	McLeod 68'	2,329	Malone	
15 November 2014	13:00	Oldham Athletic	Away	1–1	Edwards 42'	3,924	Heywood	
22 November 2014	15:00	Scunthorpe United	Home	2–2	Leacock 76', McLeod 80' pen.	2,178	Hooper	
29 November 2014	15:00	Chesterfield	Home	1–1	Tomlin 70'	2,459	Horwood	
13 December 2014	15:00	Bristol City	Away	0–1		11,660	Bull	
20 December 2014	15:00	Port Vale	Home	1–2	Henderson 88'	2,320	Robinson	
26 December 2014	15:00	Leyton Orient	Away	1–4	Smith 10'	4,108	Gibbs	
28 December 2014	15:00	Colchester United	Home	0–0		2,046	Miller	
10 January 2015	15:00	Milton Keynes Dons	Home	2–2	McLeod 14' pen., 48'	2,468	Salisbury	
17 January 2015	15:00	Rochdale	Away	1–4	Elliott 76'	2,255	Kettle	
24 January 2015	15:00	Fleetwood Town	Away	0–1		2,601	Stockbridge	
27 January 2015	19:45	Chesterfield	Away	0–3		5,329	Attwell	
31 January 2015	15:00	Preston North End	Home	2–1	Wordsworth 18', Fowler 87'	2,550	Adcock	
7 February 2015	15:00	Yeovil Town	Away	1–2	McLeod 27'	3.807	Miller	
10 February 2015	19:45	Doncaster Rovers	Home	0–5		2,581	Collins	
14 February 2015	15:00	Barnsley	Home	5–1	McLeod 45+2', 73', 83', Bradley 48', Elliot 59'	2,296	Sheldrake	
21 February 2015	15:00	Swindon Town	Away	2–1	Wordsworth 5', Tomlin 88'	7,692	Horwood	
28 February 2015	15:00	Sheffield United	Home	1–1	Wood 63'	3,320	Breakspear	
3 March 2015	19:45	Bradford City	Away	0–1		11,683	Drysdale	
7 March 2015	15:00	Bristol City	Home	1–2	Wordsworth 60'	3,333	D'Urso	
14 March 2015	15:00	Colchester United	Away	3–2	Dickson 15', Tomlin 41', McLeod 75' pen.	3,592	Adcock	
17 March 2015	19:45	Port Vale	Away	3–2	Wordsworth 43', McLeod 56', Wood 69'	3,852	Wright	
21 March 2015	15:00	Leyton Orient	Home	1–0	McLeod 33' pen.	3,255	Davies	
28 March 2015	15:00	Gillingham	Home	1–2	McLeod 63'	3,570	Kettle	
3 April 2015	15:00	Crewe Alexandra	Away	0–0		5,353	Boyeson	
6 April 2015	15:00	Oldham Athletic	Home	2–0	McLeod 15', Wood 33'	2,520	Langford	
11 April 2015	15:00	Scunthorpe United	Away	1–2	McLeod 77'	3,009	Johnson	
14 April 2015	19:45	Walsall	Away	0–5		3,296	Bull	
18 April 2015	15:00	Notts County	Home	2–0	Youga 14', Ward 16'	2,580	Collins	
25 April 2015	15:00	Peterborough United	Away	3–4	Elliott 29', Pogba 57', Simpson 66'	6,270	Breakspear	
3 May 2015	12:15	Coventry City	Home	1–2	Pogba 49'	5,744	Martin	

=== FA Cup ===
The draw for the first round of the FA Cup was made on 27 October 2014.

FA Cup match details
Round	Date	Time	Opponent	Venue	Result F–A	Scorers	Attendance	Referee	Ref.
First round	8 November 2014	15:00	Yeovil Town	Away	1–0		2,355	Gibbs	

=== League Cup ===
The draw for the first round was made on 17 June 2014 at 10am. Crawley Town were drawn at home to Ipswich Town.

League Cup match details
Round	Date	Time	Opponent	Venue	Result F–A	Scorers	Attendance	Referee	Ref.
First round	12 August 2014	19:45	Ipswich Town	Home	1–0 aet	McLeod 111'	3,043	Haines	
Second round	26 August 2014	19:45	Norwich City	Away	1–3	Cuéllar 55' o.g.	14,414	Deadman	

=== Football League Trophy ===
Football League Trophy match details
Round	Date	Time	Opponent	Venue	Result F–A	Scorers	Attendance	Referee	Ref.
First round	2 September 2014	19:45	Cambridge United	Home	2–0	Tait 54' o.g., Banya 77'	1,252	Ward	
Second round	7 October 2014	19:45	Luton Town	Away	1–0	Edwards 51'	2,186	Woolmer	
Third round	11 November 2014	19:45	Gillingham	Home	1–2	McLeod 21' pen.	1,305	Sheldrake	

== Transfers ==
=== In ===
Date	Position	Player	From	Fee	Ref.
18 May 2014	MF	Jimmy Smith	Stevenage	Undisclosed	
27 May 2014	GK	Brian Jensen	Bury	Free	
4 June 2014	DF	Ryan Dickson	Colchester United	Free	
4 June 2014	DF	Lanre Oyebanjo	York City	Free	
17 June 2014	DF	Sonny Bradley	Portsmouth	Undisclosed	
18 June 2014	FW	Gavin Tomlin	Port Vale	Undisclosed	
25 June 2014	FW	Izale McLeod	Milton Keynes Dons	Free	
26 June 2014	MF	Conor Henderson	Hull City	Free	
27 June 2014	FW	Matt Harrold	Bristol Rovers	Free	
11 July 2014	MF	Gwion Edwards	Swansea City	Undisclosed	
14 July 2014	MF	Lewis Young	Bury	Free	
17 July 2014	DF	Dean Leacock	Notts County	Free	
23 July 2014	MF	Emmett O'Connor	Scarborough City Celtic	Free	
25 July 2014	MF	Bobson Bawling	Watford	Free	
7 August 2014	MF	Charles Banya	Fulham	Free	
29 August 2014	GK	Jamie Ashdown	Leeds United	Free	
18 September 2014	MF	Marvin Elliott	Bristol City	Free	
9 January 2015	MF	Blair Anderson	Basford United	Undisclosed	
13 January 2015	GK	Evandro Rachoni De Lima	Unattached	Free	
4 February 2015	FW	Mathias Pogba	Pescara	Free	
25 March 2015	FW	John Cofie	Molde	Free	
26 March 2015	DF	Kelly Youga	Qingdao Hainiu	Free	

=== Out ===
Date	Position	Player	Subsequent Club	Fee	Ref.
5 May 2014	FW	Billy Clarke	Bradford City	Free	
5 May 2014	DF	Mark Connolly	Kilmarnock	Free	
5 May 2014	DF	Paul Connolly	Luton Town	Free	
5 May 2014	MF	Gary Dicker	Carlisle United	Free	
5 May 2014	FW	Rory Fallon	Scunthorpe United	Free	
5 May 2014	GK	Paul Jones	Portsmouth	Free	
5 May 2014	GK	Jonny Maddison	Leicester City	Free	
5 May 2014	DF	Alex Malins	Lewes	Free	
5 May 2014	FW	Jonte Smith	Kemi Kings	Free	
5 May 2014	MF	Sergio Torres	Whitehawk	Free	
10 June 2014	MF	Mike Jones	Oldham Athletic	Free	
10 June 2014	MF	Dannie Bulman	AFC Wimbledon	Free	
17 June 2014	DF	Mat Sadler	Rotherham United	Free	
20 June 2014	DF	Kyle McFadzean	Milton Keynes Dons	Undisclosed	
24 June 2014	FW	Jamie Proctor	Fleetwood Town	Free	
30 June 2014	MF	Andy Drury	Luton Town	£100,000	
28 November 2014	GK	Jamie Ashdown	Oxford United	Free	

=== Loans in ===
Date	Position	Player	From	End date	Ref.
18 July 2014	GK	Raphael Spiegel	West Ham United	16 August 2014	
31 July 2014	MF	Mitch Rose	Rotherham United	7 October 2014	
9 September 2014	MF	Josh Wright	Millwall	10 October 2014	
9 September 2014	DF	Keith Keane	Preston North End	11 December 2014	
11 September 2014	DF	Mat Sadler	Rotherham United	11 November 2014	
17 November 2014	GK	Lewis Price	Crystal Palace	20 December 2014	
27 November 2014	FW	Shaun Miller	Coventry City	28 December 2014	
9 January 2015	DF	Darren Ward	Swindon Town	30 June 2015	
15 January 2015	MF	Anthony Wordsworth	Ipswich Town	12 April 2015	
16 January 2015	GK	Lewis Price	Crystal Palace	30 June 2015	
23 January 2015	FW	Dean Morgan	Woking	30 June 2015	
23 January 2015	GK	Scott Dutton	Wolverhampton Wanderers	21 February 2015	
30 January 2015	MF	Lee Fowler	Nuneaton Town	3 May 2015	
20 February 2015	DF	Richard Wood	Rotherham United	30 June 2015	

=== Loans out ===
Date	Position	Player	To	End date	Ref.
23 January 2015	MF	Charles Banya	Woking	30 June 2015	
23 February 2015	FW	Matt Harrold	Cambridge United	30 June 2015	
2 March 2015	DF	Joe Walsh	Milton Keynes Dons	30 June 2015	
25 March 2015	MF	Emmett O'Connor	Lewes	24 April 2015	
