= James Ellison =

James Ellison may refer to:

- James O. Ellison (1929–2014), U.S. federal judge
- James T. Ellison (1862–1920s), New York gangster
- James Ellison (actor) (1910–1993), American film actor
- James Ellison (footballer, born 1901) (1901–1958), English footballer
- James Ellison (footballer, born 1991), (born 1991) English footballer
- James Ellison (motorcyclist) (born 1980), English motorcycle racer
- James Ellison (white supremacist), (born c. 1941) American white supremacist leader
- Jim Ellison (1964–1996), American singer
- Jim Ellison (Michigan politician), American politician
- James Ellison (Terminator), fictional character from The Sarah Connor Chronicles
- Jim Ellison, fictional character from The Sentinel

== See also ==
- James Taylor Ellyson (1847–1919), political figure in Virginia
