= Grocott =

Grocott is a surname. Notable people with the surname include:

- Ann Grocott (born 1938), Australian writer and painter
- Bruce Grocott, Baron Grocott PC (born 1940), Labour Party politician in the United Kingdom
- Harold Grocott (1876–1960), New Zealand lawn bowls player
- Kevin Grocott (born 1992), English footballer who plays as a right back

== See also ==
- Grocott's methenamine silver stain, abbreviated GMS, a popular staining method in histology
