= RWO =

RWO may refer to:

- RWO Alzey, a German football club from the city of Alzey, Rhineland-Palatinate
- Rwo language, a dialect of the West Kilimanjaro language
- Real world object in VMDS
- Ministerie van Ruimtelijke Ordening, Woonbeleid en Onroerend Erfgoed (Ministry of Spatial Planning, Housing Policy and Heritage sites), a Flemish Government organization that supports the Minister of Culture on policy decisions
- Real World Operation, in European Maritime Force
- Real world object, as opposed to an abstration
