= Preen =

Preen may refer to:

== Birds ==
- Preening, personal grooming of a bird's feathers especially by using its beak
- Preen gland, also called the uropygial gland, an oil gland found in many bird species

== Products ==
- Preen, a trade name for trifluralin

== Surname ==
- Garyn Preen (born 1991), Welsh footballer
- Alan Preen (born 1935), former sportsman who played Australian rules football
