= Evandro Rachoni =

Brazilian footballer (born 1989)

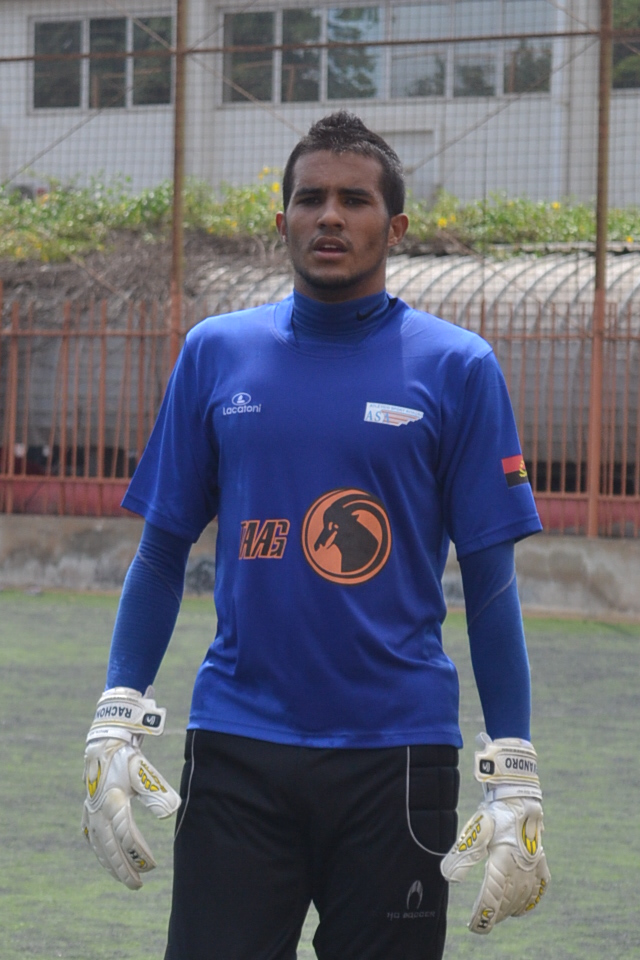
- Evandro in 2013

Personal information
- Full name: Evandro Rachoni de Lima
- Date of birth: 24 November 1989 (age 36)
- Position: Goalkeeper

Team information
- Current team: Ji-Paraná

Senior career*
Years	Team	Apps	(Gls)
2006	Rio Claro		
2007	Batatais		
2008	Santo André		
2010	São Bernardo		
2010	Fluminense		
2011	Interclube		
2012–2013	ASA		
2013	Arsenal Kyiv		
2013–2014	FK Retro		
2014	London Bari		
2014–2015	Concord Rangers	1	(0)
2015	Crawley Town	0	(0)
2015	Bishop's Stortford	0	(0)
2015–2016	Ilkeston		
2016	Wormatia Worms	1	(0)
2016	Wormatia Worms II	4	(0)
2016–2017	SV Gimbsheim		
2017	Red Force FC		
2017–2018	RWO Alzey		
2018–2022	TuS Rüssingen		
2022–2024	Lunda Sul		
2024–2026	Kabuscorp		
2026–	Ji-Paraná		
- * Club domestic league appearances and goals as of 25 February 2026

Evandro Rachoni de Lima (born 24 November 1989) is a Brazilian professional footballer who plays as a goalkeeper.

== Early and personal life ==
Evandro grew up in Rio de Janeiro. He also holds an Italian passport, which he is eligible for due to his grandfather. His brother-in-law is also a footballer who has played in the Ukrainian Premier League.

== Career ==
Evandro's early career was spent in Brazil and Angola with Rio Claro, Batatais, Santo André, São Bernardo, Fluminense, Interclube and ASA. He then played in Ukraine with Arsenal Kyiv and FK Retro, but his time there was interrupted by the unrest in that country. During his time in Ukraine his team bus was boarded by gunmen. He moved to London in September 2014, signing for non-league club London Bari a few days later. While playing for London Bari he was scouted by Premier League club West Ham United, and he also had interest from France and the United States. After a brief spell with Concord Rangers, where he made 1 league appearance, he signed for League One club Crawley Town in January 2015, on non-contract terms. He made his debut for Crawley in the Sussex Senior Cup on 13 January 2015. He trialled with Peterborough United, but the transfer fell through after a change in management at the club. After a spell with Bishop's Stortford, he signed for Ilkeston in July 2015. He has been nicknamed "Brazilian Bob" by Ilkeston's fans. He left the club by mutual consent in January 2016. He signed for German club Wormatia Worms in February 2016, making one appearance for the senior team and four appearances for the second team. He moved to SV Gimbsheim in July 2016. After a spell in the United States with Red Force FC, Rachoni returned to Germany, playing with RWO Alzey, and TuS Rüssingen.
