= Emmett O'Connor =

Canadian soccer player

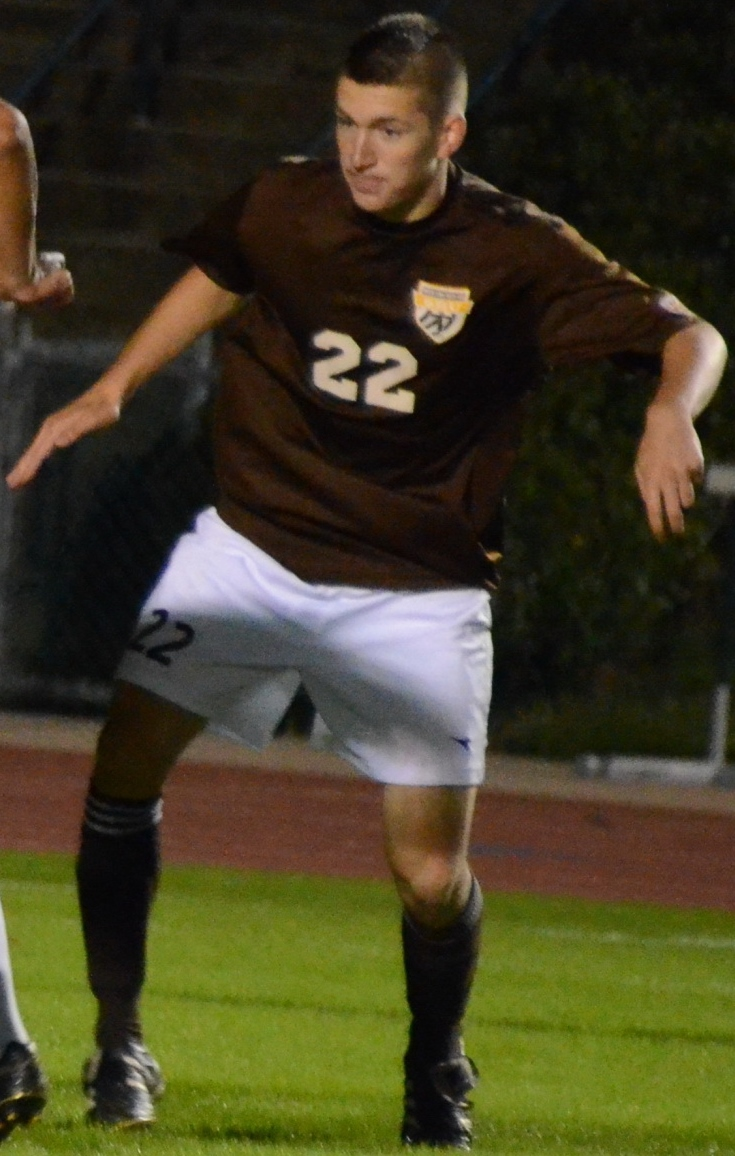
- O'Connor with St. Bonaventure in 2011

Personal information
- Full name: Emmett Diarnuid O'Connor
- Date of birth: September 13, 1992 (age 34)
- Place of birth: Ajax, Ontario, Canada
- Height: 5 ft 9 in (1.75 m)
- Position: Midfielder

Team information
- Current team: Crawley Town
- Number: 22

Youth career
- 2004–2010: Ajax Admirals
- 2010–2013: St. Bonaventure Bonnies
- 2013–2014: Scarborough City Celtic

Senior career*
Years	Team	Apps	(Gls)
2014–2015	Crawley Town	4	(0)
2015	→ Lewes (loan)	2	(1)

International career^{‡}
2005	Canada U12		
- * Club domestic league appearances and goals as of 30 April 2015 ‡ National team caps and goals as of 2 October 2014

Emmett Diarnuid O'Connor (born September 13, 1992, in Ajax, Ontario) is a Canadian professional soccer player who last played as a midfielder for Crawley Town.

== Playing career ==
Before and during high school, O'Connor played six seasons for the Ajax Admirals, an amateur U21 team affiliated with the Ontario Soccer Association. During his time at Archbishop Denis O'Connor Catholic High School, O'Connor earned various honors with the school team, including being named team captain and Male Soccer Player of the Year as a sophomore and junior, and winning four consecutive Lake Ontario Secondary School Athletics (LOSSA) championships between 2006 and 2009. After high school, O'Connor played college soccer for the St. Bonaventure Bonnies of St. Bonaventure University between 2010 and 2013. In total, O'Connor scored 17 goals and recorded a team-record 24 assists in 57 matches. After college, O'Connor played one season with Scarborough City Celtic of the Ontario Soccer League, the fifth tier of the Canadian soccer league system.

Following his final season with the Bonnies, O'Connor was invited for a trial with Crawley Town of League One, the third tier of the English football league system, by manager John Gregory. The trial was arranged by former West Ham United player and manager Kevin Keen, who was the father of one of O'Connor's teammates at St. Bonaventure. After a successful trial, which included preseason appearances against non-league Billingshurst and Oakwood and Fulham of the Premier League, he was offered a one-year contract to join the club on July 24, 2014. About O'Connor's early performances with the club, John Gregory said, "He was recommended to us, has come in and worked hard... He is the sort of kid that just wants to be a player, works hard at everything he does and gives everything at all times."

O'Connor made his league debut on August 16, 2014, as an 86th-minute substitute for Gwion Edwards against Swindon Town. He made his first competitive start for Crawley Town on September 2, 2014, in a Football League Trophy match against Cambridge United after making four previous substitute appearances. He earned his first league start four days later against Rochdale.

On 24 March 2015, O'Connor was loaned to Lewes F.C. for the remainder of the Isthmian League season so that he could play competitive soccer. In total, he appeared in two league matches and scored one goal for Lewes before returning to Crawley Town. In June 2015, it was announced that O'Connor had been released by Crawley Town.

== International career ==
In 2005, O'Connor played for a Canadian team at the Under-12 level as part of the squad that competed at the Danone Nations Cup in Paris. In the tournament, Canada finished 20th out of 32 teams and held both the Netherlands and Indonesia to 1–1 draws in addition to a 0–1 defeat to the Republic of Ireland.

== Personal ==
O'Connor also holds an Irish passport.

== Statistics ==
Season	Club	Division	League		FA Cup		League Cup		Other		Total	
Season	Club	Division	Apps	Goals	Apps	Goals	Apps	Goals	Apps	Goals	Apps	Goals
2014–15	Crawley Town	League One	3	0	0	0	2	0	1	0	6	0
Total			4	0	0	0	3	0	1	0	7	0
Career total			4	0	0	0	3	0	1	0	7	0
