= Greg Pearson =

English footballer

Personal information
- Full name: Greg Edward Pearson
- Date of birth: 3 April 1985 (age 41)
- Place of birth: Birmingham, England
- Height: 6 ft 2 in (1.88 m)
- Position: Forward

Youth career
- 1999–2001: Coventry City
- 2001–2004: West Ham United

Senior career*
Years	Team	Apps	(Gls)
2004–2005	West Ham United	0	(0)
2004	→ Barnet (loan)	10	(1)
2004	→ Lincoln City (loan)	3	(1)
2004–2005	→ Canvey Island (loan)	5	(2)
2005–2006	Rushden & Diamonds	29	(1)
2006	→ Hucknall Town (loan)	4	(2)
2006–2008	Bishops Stortford	66	(42)
2008–2012	Burton Albion	128	(37)
2011–2012	→ Aldershot Town (loan)	5	(0)
2012	→ Crewe Alexandra (loan)	9	(3)
2012–2013	Grimsby Town	12	(2)
2013	→ Kidderminster Harriers (loan)	6	(1)
2013–2014	Nuneaton Town	13	(0)
2013	→ Hednesford Town (loan)	7	(2)
2014–2015	Brackley Town	9	(1)
2015	Bishop's Stortford	7	(3)
2015	Halesowen Town		
2015–2016	Hinckley AFC	14	(6)
Total		327	(104)
- * Club domestic league appearances and goals as of 18:40, 23 march 2015 (UTC)

Greg Edward Pearson (born 3 April 1985) is an English former professional footballer who played as a forward. Currently, Head of Men’s football at the University of Birmingham.

His previous clubs include West Ham United, Barnet, Lincoln City, Canvey Island, Rushden & Diamonds, Hucknall Town, Bishop's Stortford, Burton Albion, Aldershot Town, Crewe Alexandra, Grimsby Town and Kidderminster Harriers.

== Career ==
After beginning his career as a schoolboy with Coventry City before joining the youth squad at West Ham United on a two-year Scholarship and one-year professional contract before signing another professional contract, He spent the final three months of the 2003–04 season on loan with Barnet in the Conference National, he had short loan spells at Lincoln City and non-League Canvey Island in December 2004.

After four and a half years at West Ham, he joined League Two club Rushden & Diamonds on a two-year contract. On 18 October 2005, he scored the crucial goal in the 1–0 victory over previous year's finalists Southend United in the Football League Trophy, Pearson's time at Rushden was an unsuccessful one as he went on to score only one goal in 29 league games and on 21 February 2006 he went out on loan for one month at Conference North side Hucknall Town.

=== Bishop's Stortford ===
==== 2006–07 ====
After leaving Rushden, Pearson joined Bishops Stortford. He made his debut on 17 February 2007 in the 3–2 home defeat of Sutton United. On 3 March 2007 Pearson scored his first goal for his new team in a 3–1 defeat at the hands of Farnborough Town; he grabbed a consolation goal on 75 minutes, shooting home from a corner. On 20 March 2007 he scored both goals in the 1–2 away victory against Hayes, he scored the equaliser on 41 minutes after a free kick right to left of the box was headed to him; the second came on 50 minutes when Turner's through ball set up Pearson who held the defender off well before shooting past Davies for a brace. On 3 April 2007 he scored the first goal in the 2–2 draw against Newport County on 13 minutes when a through ball released Turner who passed across for Pearson who then scored. On 7 April 2007 in the 4–3 victory over Dorchester Town Pearson put them 3–0 up when he came on as a substitute for the unwell Roy Essandoh on 26 minutes and taking 4 minutes to score from a through ball, bypassing the defence before shooting into the net. On 14 April 2007 Pearson scored an equaliser to make it 1–1 against Bedford Town, Essandoh's low cross on the left flank reached the near post where Pearson swept the ball into the opposite corner, the game finishing 2–2.

On 2 May 2007 in the Conference South play-off semi-final 1st leg against Salisbury City Pearson scored the opening goal in the 1–1 draw on 54 minutes, he managed to score from 7 yards out with his back to the goal.

==== 2007–08 ====
The following season on 18 August 2007 Pearson scored his first goal of the season in the 2–0 win at Bognor Regis Town scoring the second goal from the penalty spot on 58 minutes. On 25 August 2007 he scored the winning goal on 24 minutes after he swept the ball in after Essandoh's header hit the post in the 1–0 victory over Thurrock. On 27 August 2007 Pearson scored the first two goals within 60 seconds of each other on 55 minutes in the 4–2 win at Cambridge City, the first came when he latched onto a through ball by Jason Mason and tucked the ball underneath the keeper, his second was a superb volley seconds later. On 7 September 2007 Greg Pearson's powerful free kick gave the hosts the lead after only two minutes in the 3–4 thriller against St Albans City. On 18 September 2007 Pearson scored a hat-trick in a 6–2 thrashing of Hampton & Richmond Borough, he scored the second goal from the penalty spot on 28 minutes, he then scored the third goal breaking well on 43 minutes, Pearson then completed his hat-trick on 60 minutes with a superb edge of the box shot.

On 29 September 2007 Pearson scored two goals to secure a 2–1 away win, and through to the third round qualifying of the FA Cup at St Albans City, scoring on 24 minutes with a 20-yard free kick into the corner of the net, then on 56 minutes he scored the second going in off the far post after a through ball by Jack Midson. He failed to hit the net on 13 October 2007 in the next round, losing 1–0 against Wealdstone.

On 6 October 2007 in the 2–2 draw with Eastleigh, Pearson scored his tenth goal of the season with a header from a cross whipped in from Alex Martin. On 20 October 2007 Pearson scored a hat-trick in the 4–0 win at Weston-super-Mare, he scored the second goal on 35 minutes with the initial shot being saved, but the ball bounced back to the Blues forward and he scored from an acute angle, then on 71 minutes he latched onto a through ball and he curled the ball to the keeper's left from eight yards out, he scored the fourth goal to complete the rout on 80 minutes smashing it in from 10 yards to complete his hat-trick.

On 7 November 2007 Bishop's Stortford manager Martin Hayes said "Pearson will not be sold cheaply. I am pleased for Greg that he has been recognised and he has put himself out. He travels a long way to play for us and there were people (Rushden and Diamond and West Ham) that doubted him," he said, after Pearson won the Conference South Player of the Month for October 2007. On 24 November 2007 in the FA Trophy third qualifying round 2–1 victory against Hampton & Richmond, Pearson scored the equalising goal, latching onto a back pass by Ryan Lake and rounded Hampton keeper Matt Lovett before slotting in from an acute angle. On 15 December 2007 Pearson scored a hat-trick in the first round proper of the FA Trophy against Canvey Island, scoring the first goal a low shot on 19 minutes, he scored the second goal for his side on 26 minutes after good work by Midson to flick in and on 77 minutes Pearson put them 6–0 up when he headed in Ahmed Deen's corner while completely unmarked, it was his third hat-trick of the 2007–08 season and he now had 17 goals.

On 22 December 2007 he scored the winning goal in the 1–0 victory over Sutton United, stabbing the ball in from six yards after Danny Harris rounded the keeper prior to passing to Pearson. On 26 December 2007 against Braintree Town Pearson made it 2–2 on 24 minutes after turning the ball in from Deen's cross; Braintree won 4–3. On 28 December 2007 as Bishop's Stortford were chasing a play-off spot, Pearson scored all 4 goals in the 4–0 thrashing of Cambridge City, his first in the 15th minute with a miscued shot which fell to Pearson, David Theobald dived in to block, but the ball fell back to Pearson who rifled the ball home, in the 23rd minute he scored from the penalty spot and then in the 56th minute Pearson for his hat-trick sliding home Midson's pinpoint centre, his final goal of the match came in the 72nd minute with another penalty after he had been upended by Lee Chaffey.

The following calendar year on 1 January 2008 Pearson scored the opening goal in the 2–1 defeat at Braintree, controlling the ball and firing in from close range Danny Harris headed the ball back into the danger zone. On 8 January 2008 Pearson scored the second goal in the 4–1 win against Havant & Waterlooville on the stroke of half-time, Loui Fazakerley providing the cross from which Pearson finished. Having not scored in the last six matches, on 12 February 2008 Pearson scored a brace in the 4–0 away win at Dorchester Town, he scored the third goal on 72 minutes as the ball was pushed back from a corner for Pearson to score, he scored the final goal of the game 3 minutes later from a cross into the six-yard box for Pearson to grab his second. On 8 March 2008 Pearson scored an equaliser on 47 minutes in the 2–1 away victory against Havant & Waterlooville. On 22 March 2008 Pearson scored a 77th-minute equaliser in the 2–2 draw against Hayes and Yeading to keep Bishop's Stortford in fifth position. On 26 April 2008 he scored an 83rd-minute equaliser in the 1–1 home draw against Bath City from Deen's cross from the left to the near post was flicked in by Pearson.

He went on to score 42 goals in 67 games in two seasons. While at Bishop's Stortford Pearson won the Conference South player of the year and golden boot.

=== Burton Albion ===
==== 2008–09 ====
After spending the whole pre-season on trial with Notts County, on 26 July 2008 Pearson joined Burton Albion on a two-year contract, reportedly paying over £10,000 for his services. On 9 August 2008 he scored the crucial goal on his debut for the Brewers, a close range effort after 2 minutes in the 0–1 away win at Salisbury City. Pearson scored in four consecutive games, on 16 August 2008 from an equalising penalty against Woking, which Burton went on to win 3–2. In the following game on 23 August 2008, Pearson scored in the 4–3 away defeat at Histon, another penalty in the 45th minute for his third goal of the season. Two days later on 25 August 2008 he scored the opening goal on 31 minutes, slotting home from close range in the 2–2 draw against Kidderminster Harriers. His fifth goal of the season came in a 5–2 home win against Lewes, scoring the opening goal from close range in the 10th minute. Pearson received his first yellow card of the season the following week on 6 September 2008, in the 4–1 loss against Stevenage. On 13 September 2008 he scored the equaliser in the 4–1 draw against Weymouth, converting a cross from Jody Banim at close range. On 22 September 2008 he scored the winner in the 0–1 away match at Kettering after a confusion between Guy Branston and the goalkeeper Lee Harper for Pearson to pounce 11 minutes from time. On 4 October 2008 Pearson scored both goals in the 2–1 win at the Pirelli Stadium, after conceding the opening goal against Crawley, but after 37 minutes a free kick from Marc Goodfellow which Pearson volleyed in his 8th goal of the season from eight yards, his second came from a 90th-minute penalty to clinch the game.

Pearson's tenth goal of the season came seven games later on 15 November 2008 in the 0–1 victory at Lewes after Aswad Thomas felled Lee Morris and Pearson converted the penalty right before half-time. On 29 November 2008 he scored the opener in the 2–0 win against Eastbourne Borough from the penalty spot in the 56th minute, after Shaun Harrad was fouled in the box. On 6 December 2008 Pearson scored the third goal for his side, converting another penalty on 58 minutes, in the 3–2 victory at Forest Green Rovers, he also received his second yellow card of the campaign in the 82nd minute. After coming on as a substitute in the 60th minute on 9 December 2008, Pearson scored the final goal to make it a 3–1 win against Cambridge United with six minutes to go, a breakaway move saw Keith Gilroy release Pearson, running at their central defenders he cut in from the left and held off his marker to fire a superb right-footed shot from 12 yards into the far corner.

Pearson helped Burton Albion into the Football League that season scoring 18 league goals and 20 in all competitions.

==== 2009–10 ====
On 8 August 2009 Pearson scored Burton's first ever Football League goal in their 3–1 away defeat to Shrewsbury Town. On 12 December 2009 he scored Burton's first Football League hat-trick during a 6–1 victory over Aldershot Town, he scored the opening goal from the penalty spot in the 31st minute when Chris Blackburn was deemed to have handled the ball in the box, eight minutes later he scored the second goal with Steve Kabba putting Pearson through on goal, composing himself well before firing low past the helpless Mikhael Jaimez-Ruiz, his third goal was scored with seconds remaining till half-time from a corner as Pearson got a slight touch to put the ball into the net.

On 26 April 2010 Pearson signed a new two-year deal, keeping him at the Brewers until 2012. On 8 May 2010 Pearson opened the deadlock in the 10th minute, scoring from the edge of the area to the top left corner of the goal in a 3–0 Albion victory at the Pirelli Stadium on the final day of the 2009–10 season that sentenced Grimsby Town to non-league football for the first time in their history.

==== 2010–11 ====
The following season Pearson had not played since the opening day of the season having only played 13 minutes as a substitute in the 2–2 draw against Torquay United after fracturing a big toe in training with more than two months on the sidelines.

==== 2011–12 ====
In November 2011 Pearson completed a loan signing with Aldershot Town until 7 January 2012.

In January 2012 Pearson went out on loan again, this time to Crewe Alexandra. He scored on his debut on 14 January in a 0–1 away win at Oxford United, Matt Tootle re-found Nick Powell and his skill unlocked the Oxford defence before his low cross was touched home by Pearson from close range just ahead of Michael Duberry. On 21 January 2012 he scored an equaliser against Dagenham & Redbridge, dispatching his shot on the half volley for his second goal in as many games, Crewe went on to win 4–1. Pearson's loan was extended for another two months with Crewe manager Steve Davis stating "Our own forwards have not been scoring enough goals, but Greg has shown he can. He gets into the six-yard box and gives us a physical presence up there." On 25 February 2012 he put his side 3–1 up in the eventual 3–3 draw at home to AFC Wimbledon after some splendid forward play from Pearson. He held off the intentions of former defender Mat Mitchel-King before turning and volleying past Brown after a cross from Luke Murphy had taken a deflection and looped into the air.

On 20 March 2012 Pearson was recalled by Burton Albion due to his goalscoring exploits at Crewe, Burton caretaker manager Gary Rowett said "It makes sense to bring Greg back as we've scored once in six games and he's been out at Crewe scoring goals."

=== Grimsby Town ===
Following his release from Burton Albion in May, Pearson signed a one-year contract for Conference National side Grimsby Town on 7 July 2012. He previously had a trial with the Mariners in November 2004, when he was 19.

Pearson scored his first two goals for Grimsby on 27 August 2012 against Mansfield Town, scoring the second goal of the game after great work by Aswad Thomas to beat his marker for pace, but was brought down in the box, up came Pearson to confidently score the penalty kick on 45 minutes, he scored the fourth goal of the game on 76 minutes with a superb flick on at the front post that looped over the head of the head of the helpless Alan Marriott into the net, the game finishing a 4–1 to Grimsby. On 15 December 2012 he scored the third goal of the game in the 4–0 thrashing of Havant & Waterlooville in the FA Trophy, a glancing header, from a cross first-time by Marcus Marshall.

On 8 February 2013 after struggling to break into the club's first team he was loaned out to Kidderminster Harriers until the end of the season. He made his debut in a 4–0 away win at Hyde coming on as a substitute and scoring the fourth goal. Pearson left Grimsby who at the time were leading the Conference for a Kidderminster side who were just outside the play-offs, by the end of the season Kidderminster who having beaten Grimsby on their way had got themselves into second place and with a chance of becoming champions on the final day of the season, but despite beating Stockport County, they were unable to overhaul Mansfield Town and had to settle for a place in the play-offs. Both Kidderminster and Grimsby were defeated in the semi-finals and Pearson returned to Grimsby on 3 May 2013, where he was released.

=== Nuneaton Town ===
On 4 July 2013 Pearson signed a one-year deal with Nuneaton Town. In July 2014 he joined Brackley Town.

=== Hinckley AFC ===
On 17 December 2015 Pearson signed for Hinckley AFC, playing in the Midland Football League and made his debut in a 2–3 win at Stafford Town on 19 December 2015. Scored his debut goal for Hinckley AFC at home to Nuneaton Griff on 26 December 2015.

== International career ==
On 27 October 2008, Pearson was named in the England C 16-man squad to face Italy Lega Pro in Group A of the International Challenge Trophy on 12 November, but he had to drop out due to educational commitments for his degree in physiotherapy.

== Career statistics ==
As of match played 2 February 2013

Club	Season	League		FA Cup		League Cup		FL Trophy		FA Trophy		Play-offs		Total	
Club	Season	Apps	Goals	Apps	Goals	Apps	Goals	Apps	Goals	Apps	Goals	Apps	Goals	Apps	Goals
Barnet (loan)	2003–04	10	1	0	0	0	0	0	0	0	0	0	0	10	1
Lincoln City (loan)	2004–05	3	1	0	0	0	0	0	0	0	0	0	0	3	1
Canvey Island (loan)	2004–05	5	1	0	0	0	0	0	0	0	0	0	0	5	1
Rushden & Diamonds	2005–06	22	1	3	0	1	0	1	1	0	0	0	0	27	2
Hucknall Town (loan)	2005–06	5	1	0	0	0	0	0	0	0	0	0	0	5	1
Rushden & Diamonds	2006–07	7	0	0	0	0	0	0	0	0	0	0	0	7	0
Bishop's Stortford	2006–07	12	6	0	0	0	0	0	0	0	0	2	1	14	7
Bishop's Stortford	2007–08	46	27	2	2	0	0	0	0	3	4	0	0	51	33
Bishop's Stortford	Total	58	33	2	2	0	0	0	0	3	4	2	1	65	40
Burton Albion	2008–09	39	18	1	0	0	0	0	0	3	1	0	0	43	19
Burton Albion	2009–10	42	14	2	0	1	0	1	0	0	0	0	0	46	14
Burton Albion	2010–11	35	5	2	0	1	0	1	0	0	0	0	0	39	5
Burton Albion	2011–12	12	0	0	0	0	0	0	0	0	0	0	0	12	0
Burton Albion	Total	128	37	5	0	2	0	2	0	3	1	0	0	140	38
Aldershot Town (loan)	2011–12	5	0	1	0	0	0	0	0	0	0	0	0	6	0
Crewe Alexandra (loan)	2011–12	9	3	0	0	0	0	0	0	0	0	0	0	9	3
Grimsby Town	2012–13	12	2	0	0	0	0	0	0	2	1	0	0	14	3
Kidderminster Harriers (loan)	2012–13	4	1	0	0	0	0	0	0	0	0	0	0	4	1
Career Total		268	81	11	2	3	0	3	1	8	6	2	1	295	91

== Personal life ==
Pearson studied a three-year degree in physiotherapy at the University of Birmingham while being on a part-time basis at Burton Albion, he finished his studies in 2010 and then became a full-time player for them.

== Honours ==
=== Club ===
Burton Albion

- Conference National: 2008–09

Grimsby Town

- Lincolnshire Senior Cup: 2012–13

=== Individual ===
- Conference South Player of the Month: October 2007
- Conference South Player of the Year and Golden Boot award: 2007–08
