= Garyn Preen =

Welsh footballer

Personal information
- Date of birth: 25 October 1991 (age 35)
- Place of birth: Tredegar, Wales
- Position: Winger

Team information
- Current team: RTB Ebbw Vale

Youth career
- –2004: Cardiff City
- 2004–2009: Southampton

Senior career*
Years	Team	Apps	(Gls)
2009–2010	Southampton	0	(0)
2010–2011	Burton Albion	2	(0)
2010	→ Stafford Rangers (loan)	1	(0)
2011–2012	Neath	0	(0)
2012	Salisbury City	4	(0)
2012–2013	Merthyr Town		
2013–2015	Afan Lido		
2015–2017	Hungerford Town	25	(3)
2016–2017	→ Evesham United (loan)	9	(2)
2017	Evesham United	12	(1)
2017–2018	Hereford	5	(3)
2018–2020	Evesham United		
2021–	RTB Ebbw Vale		

International career
2007–2008	Wales U17	8	(2)
2008–2009	Wales U19	6	(0)
- * Club domestic league appearances and goals as of 16 May 2018

Garyn Vernon Preen (born 25 October 1991) is a Welsh footballer who plays as a winger for RTB Ebbw Vale.

== Club career ==
Preen began his career as a youth player with Welsh club Cardiff City, joining the youth system at Southampton at the age of 12. On 23 July 2010, with no appearances for the South Coast club, he joined League Two side Burton Albion on a free transfer following his release by the Saints. Preen made his debut for the club on 11 August in the First Round of the League Cup against former club Cardiff City, coming on as a 73rd-minute substitute for Lewis Young.

On 26 November he went on loan to Stafford Rangers with fellow Burton Albion player James Ellison. He made his debut for the club on 11 December in a 0-2 home defeat to Workington.

At the end of the 2010–11, Preen was released from the Brewers.

In June 2011 he joined Neath.

In 2012, he joined Salisbury City, before returning to Wales in October to sign for Merthyr Town. He joined Merthyr's Southern League rivals Cinderford Town in 2013.

Preen Signed for Hereford in 2017 and scored against Eastleigh in the FA Cup 4th Qualifying Round in that game he was taken off injured after a collision with Gavin Hoyte knocked him out. On 26 February 2018, he was released by Hereford F.C.
