= Lewis Young =

English footballer (born 1989)

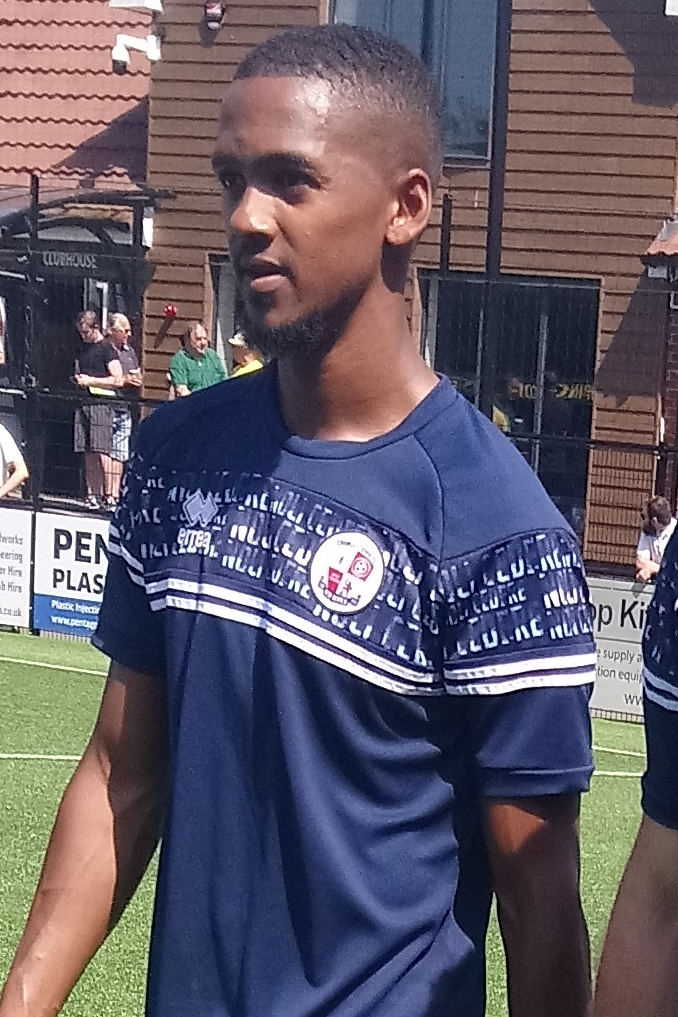
- Young with Crawley Town in July 2021

Personal information
- Full name: Lewis Jack Young
- Date of birth: 27 September 1989 (age 37)
- Place of birth: Stevenage, England
- Height: 1.78 m (5 ft 10 in)
- Position: Defender

Youth career
- 2006–2008: Watford

Senior career*
Years	Team	Apps	(Gls)
2008–2010	Watford	1	(0)
2010	→ Hereford United (loan)	6	(0)
2010–2011	Burton Albion	19	(0)
2011	→ Forest Green Rovers (loan)	1	(0)
2011–2012	Northampton Town	30	(0)
2012–2013	Yeovil Town	15	(0)
2013–2014	Aldershot Town	15	(0)
2014	Bury	4	(0)
2014–2021	Crawley Town	213	(5)
Total		304	(5)

Managerial career
- 2022: Crawley Town (caretaker)
- 2022: Crawley Town (caretaker)
- 2024–2025: Dagenham & Redbridge
- * Club domestic league appearances and goals

Lewis Jack Young (born 27 September 1989) is an English former professional footballer who played as a right back. He was most recently manager of Dagenham & Redbridge.

== Club career ==
For the 2008–09 season, Young was given the number 32 shirt for Watford and for the 2009–10 season, number 21. He made his debut as a substitute in Watford's 1–0 victory over Bristol Rovers in the League Cup on 12 August 2008. On Boxing Day of 2008, Young made his league debut for Watford in a 4–2 home defeat against Bristol City, replacing Mat Sadler at half-time. In 2010, towards the end of Young's Watford career, he joined Hereford United on a one-month loan deal. On 20 March 2010, Young made his Hereford United debut in a 2–0 victory over Bradford City, playing the full 90 minutes.

Young joined League Two side Burton Albion on 22 July 2010, following an extended trial period. He made his debut for the Brewers in a League Two match against Oxford United on 7 August 2010. In March 2011, Young joined Forest Green Rovers on a short-term loan deal. He played just once for Forest Green before being recalled by Burton because of an injury crisis. Young was released from the Brewers in May 2011.

On 7 July 2011, Young joined Northampton Town on a one-year deal, after a successful trial. On 6 August 2011, Young made his Northampton debut in their 0–0 draw with Accrington Stanley, replacing Paul Turnbull in the 70th minute. Young went onto appear in thirty league games for the Cobblers before leaving in June 2012 on the expiry of his contract.

On 2 July 2012, Young signed for League One side Yeovil Town on a one-year contract, linking up with former manager Gary Johnson. A season hampered by injury saw Young make 17 appearances although only two of them starts and was an unused substitute as Yeovil won the 2013 League One play-off final and secured promotion to the Football League Championship. On 31 August 2013, Young was released by Yeovil after the expiry of his short-term contract, in total he made 17 appearances in his twelve months with the Glovers.

On 20 September 2013, Young joined Football Conference side Aldershot Town on a six-month contract. A day later, Young made his Aldershot debut in their 2–0 victory over Wrexham, featuring for 67 minutes before being replaced by Jordan Roberts. On 3 December 2013, Young scored twice in Aldershot's 5–2 away victory over Weston-super-Mare in the first round of the FA Trophy.

On 28 February 2014, Young joined Bury until the end of the 2013–14 season after a successful trial period.

Young joined Crawley Town on 14 July 2014 on a one-year deal, becoming Crawley Town's 11th summer signing. On 9 August 2014, Young made his Crawley debut in a 1–0 victory against Barnsley, featuring for 56 minutes before being replaced by Charles Banya. On 3 February 2018, he scored his first ever professional goal during Crawley's 2–1 away victory over Chesterfield, claiming the winner in the 93rd minute. In July 2018, he signed a new two-year contract. He signed a two-year contract extension in the summer of 2020. He announced his retirement from professional football in August 2021, due to recurring injuries. He took up a coaching role at Crawley Town.

== Coaching career ==
After taking up a coaching role at Crawley in 2021 after retiring from playing, in February 2022 Young became the assistant manager of the Red Devils following the departure of then assistant manager Lee Bradbury. Following John Yems' suspension in April for accusations of discriminatory language towards his own players, Young took charge of the upcoming matches. After a 2–0 away defeat at Mansfield Town less than 24 hours after Yems' suspension, Young spoke that he had "great pride in the group, just sticking together and going out there trying their best. That's all we ask." On 6 May, Crawley parted company with Yems with Young continuing as interim manager and taking charge of the last game of the season at already relegated Oldham in which they drew 3–3 sealing a third consecutive 12th place league finish. Following the appointment of Kevin Betsy as manager, Young was included within Betsy's coaching staff. Following Betsy's sacking on 9 October, Young was again placed in caretaker charge. Six days later, Crawley beat Newport County 2–1 at home on his first match on his return as caretaker manager, claiming his first win whilst in charge. On 27 November 2022, Young was announced to have left Crawley with immediate effect, the appointment of Matthew Etherington as manager being announced shortly after.

In April 2023, he was appointed first-team coach at National League club Dagenham & Redbridge. On 26 December 2024, Young was appointed caretaker manager following the sacking of Ben Strevens. Having overseen three matches in temporary charge, he was appointed permanently on a two-and-a-half year deal on 16 January 2025. Following the club's relegation on the final day of the 2024–25 season, the club parted company with Young.

== Personal life ==
Lewis is the younger brother of Ipswich Town footballer Ashley Young, and is of Jamaican descent through his father.

== Career statistics ==
Appearances and goals by club, season and competition
Club	Season	League			FA Cup		League Cup		Other		Total	
Club	Season	Division	Apps	Goals	Apps	Goals	Apps	Goals	Apps	Goals	Apps	Goals
Watford	2008–09	Championship	1	0	0	0	3	0	—		4	0
Watford	2009–10	Championship	0	0	0	0	0	0	—		0	0
Watford	Total		1	0	0	0	3	0	—		4	0
Hereford United (loan)	2009–10	League Two	6	0	—		—		—		6	0
Burton Albion	2010–11	League Two	19	0	1	0	1	0	1 (Note: Appearance(s) in Football League Trophy)	0	22	0
Forest Green Rovers (loan)	2010–11	Conference Premier	1	0	—		—		—		1	0
Northampton Town	2011–12	League Two	30	0	1	0	2	0	1	0	34	0
Yeovil Town	2012–13	League One	15	0	0	0	2	0	0	0	17	0
Yeovil Town	2013–14	Championship	0	0	0	0	0	0	—		0	0
Yeovil Town	Total		15	0	0	0	2	0	0	0	17	0
Aldershot Town	2013–14	Conference Premier	15	0	2	0	—		4 (Note: Appearances in FA Trophy)	2	21	2
Bury	2013–14	League Two	4	0	—		—		—		4	0
Crawley Town	2014–15	League One	38	0	1	0	2	0	3	0	44	0
Crawley Town	2015–16	League Two	38	0	1	0	1	0	1	0	41	0
Crawley Town	2016–17	League Two	43	0	2	0	1	0	3 (Note: Appearance(s) in EFL Trophy)	0	49	0
Crawley Town	2017–18	League Two	41	3	1	0	0	0	1	0	43	3
Crawley Town	2018–19	League Two	38	1	2	0	1	0	1	0	42	1
Crawley Town	2019–20	League Two	15	1	2	0	1	0	3	0	21	1
Crawley Town	2020–21	League Two	0	0	0	0	0	0	0	0	0	0
Crawley Town	Total		213	5	9	0	6	0	12	0	240	5
Career total			304	5	13	0	14	0	18	2	349	7

== Managerial statistics ==
As of 8 May 2025

Managerial record by team and tenure
Team	From	To	Record							
Team	From	To	P	W	D	L	GF	GA	GD	Win %
Crawley Town (caretaker)	22 April 2022	8 May 2022	4	0	1	3	2	9	−7	0.0
Crawley Town (caretaker)	9 October 2022	27 November 2022	10	4	3	3	17	17	+0	40.0
Dagenham & Redbridge	26 December 2024	8 May 2025	24	5	9	10	24	32	−8	20.8
Total			38	9	13	16	43	58	−15	23.7

== Honours ==
Yeovil Town

- Football League One play-offs: 2013
