= Keith Gilroy =

Irish footballer and coach

Personal information
- Full name: Keith Gilroy
- Date of birth: 8 July 1983 (age 43)
- Place of birth: Sligo, Ireland
- Height: 1.78 m (5 ft 10 in)
- Position: Midfielder

Senior career*
Years	Team	Apps	(Gls)
2001–2002	Sligo Rovers	6	(1)
2002–2003	Middlesbrough	0	(0)
2003–2005	Scarborough	41	(5)
2005	Darlington	2	(0)
2005–2011	Burton Albion	140	(15)
2013	Stapenhill	1	(0)
Total		190	(21)

International career
1999–2000	Republic of Ireland U16	4	(0)
- Republic of Ireland U21
- * Club domestic league appearances and goals

Keith Gilroy (born 18 July 1983) is an Irish football coach and former professional footballer.

== Playing career ==
His previous clubs include Sligo Rovers, Middlesbrough, and more recently Scarborough and Darlington.

After a short spell at Sligo Rovers, Gilroy made the step up to Middlesbrough where he failed to play a first team game. After being released, he joined Scarborough for a two-year spell before leaving in the summer of 2005 to play 2 games for Darlington, after and unsuccessful spell, he joined Burton Albion.

Gilroy signed a new two-year contract after promotion to the Football League, but injuries restricted his playing time before his release in May 2011.

== Coaching career ==
Following his release by Burton in 2011, Gilroy became a coach at the Derby County academy. He later started his own driving school, called 'Gilroy Driving'. In 2019, he returned to former club Burton Albion as a coach.

In June 2025, Gilroy left his role as academy director at Burton Albion to return to work in Derby County's academy, in the role of Head of Academy Coaching.

== Honours ==
- Conference National: 2009
