= RWO Alzey =

German football club

SG RWO Alzey
- Full name: Sportgemeinde Rot-Weiß-Olympia Alzey
- Founded: 1910
- Ground: Wartbergstadion
- Capacity: 3,000
- League: Landesliga Südwest-Ost (VII)
- 2015–16: 6th
Home colours	Away colours

Logo of original side 1. FC Olympia Alzey.

RWO Alzey is a German football club from the city of Alzey, Rhineland-Palatinate.

== History ==
The club was established on 6 June 1910 as 1. Alzeyer Fußball-Club Olympia. Like many smaller clubs throughout Germany, Olympia was forced into a merger with other local sides under the policies of the Nazi regime, playing alongside Turnverein Alzey and Schwimmclub Alzey. The club was briefly lost following World War II when occupying Allied authorities banned most organizations in the country, including sports and football associations.

The team was reestablished 25 January 1946 as Sportgemeinde Rot-Weiß Alzey. A separate side called 1. Alzeyer FC Olympia broke away in 1955, but rejoined the parent team on 7 February 1956 to form the present day club.

A longtime local level club, RWO broke through for a single season in the Oberliga Südwest (IV) in 1996–97 and was sent down after a 17th-place result.

Nowadays the club plays in the tier seven Landesliga Südwest-Ost.
