= James Ellison (footballer, born 1991) =

English footballer

Personal information
- Date of birth: 25 October 1991 (age 35)
- Place of birth: Liverpool, England
- Position: Striker

Youth career
- 2000–2009: Liverpool

Senior career*
Years	Team	Apps	(Gls)
2009–2010	Liverpool	0	(0)
2010–2011	Burton Albion	2	(0)
2010	→ Stafford Rangers (loan)	1	(0)
2011	→ Hednesford Town (loan)	4	(0)
2011	→ Alfreton Town (loan)	8	(1)
2011	→ Chester (loan)	3	(0)
2011–2012	Hyde	3	(0)
2012	Southport	18	(1)
2012	→ Vauxhall Motors (loan)	7	(2)
2012–2013	Droylsden	13	(5)
2013–2014	Colwyn Bay	55	(15)
2014–2015	Barrow	20	(2)
2015	→ Colwyn Bay (loan)	12	(3)

International career
2007	England U16	1	(0)
- * Club domestic league appearances and goals as of 21:03, 29 June 2015 (UTC)

James Ellison (born 25 October 1991) is an English footballer who plays as a striker. He has played for clubs including Liverpool, Burton Albion, Hyde and Southport.

== Club career ==
=== Liverpool ===
Born in Liverpool, Merseyside, Ellison began his career at his local team, Liverpool, joining the youth academy at the age of 8. Ellison signed a professional contract with his hometown club in 2009, however he negotiated his release in a search for regular first team football at the end of the 2009–10 season; he failed to make an appearance during his time with the club.

=== Burton Albion ===
Seeking regular first-team football, Ellison left Liverpool by mutual agreement in July 2010, to join Burton Albion of League Two on a 2-year contract.

Ellison made his debut for Burton on 11 August 2010 in the League Cup, in their 4–1 away defeat to Cardiff City. He made his Football League debut on 4 September 2010 in a 3–0 win over Hereford United.

On 3 October 2010, Ellison was stabbed in the back during a night out in Liverpool. He was treated in hospital and went on to make a full recovery.

==== Stafford Rangers (loan) ====
On 26 November 2010, Ellison joined Stafford Rangers on loan, along with fellow Burton Albion player Garyn Preen. He made his debut for the club on 11 December 2010 in a 2–0 home defeat to Workington.

==== Hednesford Town (loan) ====
In March 2011, he joined Hednesford Town on loan and made his debut for the club on 19 March as a second-half substitute against Cirencester Town.

==== Alfreton Town (loan) ====
In August 2011, at the beginning of the 2011–12 season, Ellison joined Alfreton Town on a one-month loan, scoring the winning goal with a last minute header to give Alfreton their first home win in the Conference Premier, a 2–1 victory over Barrow. This was Ellison's first ever senior goal; he went on to make a further seven appearances for the club, but was unable to score again before returning to Burton.

==== Chester (loan) ====
In November 2011, having returned from his loan spell at Alfreton, Ellison went on a further loan, to Chester, for one month. He was released from his contract at Burton upon his return from Chester.

=== Hyde ===
On 24 December 2011, he signed for Conference North side Hyde. He made his debut for the club on 26 December, in a 1–1 draw with Stalybridge Celtic.

Ellison made his first start for the club in the return fixture at Bower Fold on New Year's Day; Hyde manager Gary Lowe said of Ellison, "He did well for us on his first start and he is a player with a bright future".

=== Southport ===
After just three appearances for Hyde, he signed for Conference Premier side Southport on 9 January 2012. He scored his first goal for the club in their last home game of the 2011–12 season, against Ebbsfleet United.

==== Vauxhall Motors (loan) ====
At the start of the 2012–13 season, Ellison joined Conference North side Vauxhall Motors, to regain match fitness having picked up an injury in Southport's first pre-season friendly against Preston North End. During this period Ellison scored two goals in seven games before He returned to Southport and played in a number of Conference matches before being released by the club in October 2012.

=== Droylsden ===
On 26 October he signed for Droylsden and made his club debut the next day, in a 2–0 victory over Colwyn Bay. Ellison scored his first goal in a 2–1 loss away at Workington Town on his second appearance for the club.

=== Colwyn Bay ===
Ellison left Droylsden midway through the 2012–13 season, and joined Colwyn Bay; five goals in his first eight matches for the club proved vital in their ultimately successful attempt to escape relegation, the club winning the last six games of their league season to remain in the Conference North.

=== Barrow ===
In July 2014 he joined Barrow.

== International career ==
Ellison has made one appearance for the England under-16s in 2007.
