= Kevin Grocott =

English footballer

Personal information
- Full name: Kevin James Grocott
- Date of birth: 31 July 1992 (age 34)
- Place of birth: Derby, England
- Position: Right back

Team information
- Current team: Mickleover Sports

Youth career
- Derby County
- Notts County
- Burton Albion

Senior career*
Years	Team	Apps	(Gls)
2010–11	Burton Albion	2	(0)
2011	→ Vauxhall Motors (loan)	5	(0)
2011	Vauxhall Motors	14	(0)
2011–12	Mickleover Sports	23	(1)
2012–13	Mickleover Sports	34	(1)
2013–14	Mickleover Sports		
- * Club domestic league appearances and goals as of 29 April 2013

Kevin James Grocott (born 31 July 1992) is an English association footballer who plays as a right back or Midfield for Mickleover Sports.

== Playing career ==
Grocott spent time in a youth teams of both Derby County F.C. and Notts County F.C. before he signed with Burton Albion F.C. In May 2010 he signed his first professional contract with a club.

He made his debut on 11 September 2010, as substitute replacing Aaron Webster 40 minutes into a 3–3 draw with Rotherham United F.C.at a Don Valley Stadium. At the point he entered the game Burton were losing 3–0.

On 31 January 2011 Grocott joined Vauxhall Motors F.C. for a month's loan. Grocott made his debut for Vauxhall Motors F.C. against Droylsden F.C. on 1 February 2011.

Grocott joined Vauxhall Motors on a permanent deal on 25 March after his release from Burton Albion where he stayed until he was released from his contract on 1 October 2011 to join Mickleover Sports. On 3 November 2016 he joined Matlock Town F.C.
