= 2012–13 Burton Albion F.C. season =

Burton Albion
2012–13 season
- Chairman: Ben Robinson
- Manager: Gary Rowett
- Ground: Pirelli Stadium
- League Two: 4th
- 2013 Football League play-offs: Semi-finals (eliminated by Bradford City)
- FA Cup: 3rd round Eliminated by Leicester City
- League Cup: 3rd round Eliminated by Bradford City
- FL Trophy: Northern Section East; 1st Round; Eliminated by Coventry City
- Top goalscorer: League: Jacques Maghoma (15); All: Jacques Maghoma (17)
- Highest home attendance: 6,148 (5 May vs Bradford City, League Two)
- Lowest home attendance: 1,712 (20 November vs Aldershot Town, League Two)
- Average home league attendance: 2,859
Home colours	Away colours

The 2012–13 season was Burton Albion's fourth consecutive season in the League Two, having finished 17th in the 2011–12 season. The season marked Gary Rowett's first full season in management with the club, having been appointed on a full-time basis on 11 May. His reign started with the club's first ever League Cup victory with a 5–4 penalty defeat of Sheffield United at Bramall Lane.

== Key events ==
=== May ===
- 9 May: Albion begin preparations for the new season by releasing five first-team players; James Wren, Kristian Ramsey-Dixon, Danny Blanchett, Andres Gurrieri and Patrick Ada. Jack Dyer and Adi Yussuf both sign one-year contract extensions.
- 11 May: Gary Rowett is announced as the club's full-time manager following a spell in caretaker charge alongside Kevin Poole, who is retained as goalkeeping coach.
- 15 May: Albion release four more players; Adam Bolder, Ryan Austin, Tony James and Greg Pearson, whilst Nathan Stanton and Aaron Webster both sign one-year contract extensions.
- 18 May: Albion unveil Kevin Summerfield as the club's new assistant manager.
- 24 May: Rowett names former Swindon Town scout Paul Molesworth as the club's chief scout.
- 24 May: Rowett makes his first move in the transfer market, by signing ex-Tranmere Rovers midfielder Robbie Weir on a free transfer. The 23-year-old Northern Irishman joins on a two-year deal.

=== June ===
- 5 June: Scotsman Zander Diamond becomes Albion's second summer signing, joining on a free transfer for Oldham Athletic.
- 13 June: Round One of the 2012–13 League Cup is drawn. For the fourth successive year, Albion are drawn away from home, this time against Sheffield United.
- 18 June: The fixtures for the League Two 2012–13 season are released. Albion's first game is against Rotherham United in the first game ever played at their New York Stadium.
- 27 June: Albion's third signing of the summer is left-back Damien McCrory. The former Dagenham & Redbridge defender signs a two-year contract with the Brewers.

=== July ===
- 16 July: Albion sign former Rochdale defender Marcus Holness on a two-year deal.
- 27 July: Albion complete a double-deal to sign goalkeepers Dean Lyness and Ross Atkins. Lyness joins on a free transfer from Kidderminster Harriers whilst Atkins returns to the club for a second season-long loan spell from Derby County.
- 31 July: Albion re-sign midfielder Lee Bell on a free transfer from recently promoted Crewe Alexandra. Bell has had two previous loan spells with the Brewers and signs a one-year contract.

=== August ===
- 11 August: Albion begin their season with a 5–4 penalty shootout defeat of Sheffield United, after a 2–2 draw during normal time. This represented the club's first ever victory in a League Cup game. Adi Yussuf scores the club's first goal of the season.
- 15 August: Round Two of the 2012–13 League Cup is drawn. Albion are again drawn away from home, this time against Leicester City. Albion also complete the signings of striker Matt Paterson on a free transfer from Southend United and defender Anthony O'Connor on a one-month loan deal from Blackburn Rovers.
- 18 August: Albion begin their League Two by being defeated 3–0 by Rotherham United. Round One of the 2012–13 Johnstone's Paint Trophy is drawn. Albion are drawn away from home against recently relegated Coventry City.
- 28 August: Albion continue their League Cup success with a 4–2 away victory over Leicester City at the King Power Stadium. The Brewers will be competing in the third round of the competition for the first time.
- 30 August: Round Three of the 2012–13 League Cup is drawn. For the sixth consecutive game in the competition Albion are drawn away from home. This time the opposition will be Bradford City. Also on this day, Billy Kee puts pen to paper on a new three-year contract, that will see him stay with the club until 2015.

=== September ===
- 3 September: Billy Kee is called up to the Northern Ireland Under 21 side for the Under 21 European Championship qualifying games against Macedonia and Denmark.
- 4 September: Albion are knocked out of the Johnstone's Paint Trophy by Coventry City after a 10–9 penalty shootout defeat. The Brewers had held the League One side to a 0–0 during the 90 minutes, but missed penalties from Marcus Holness and Dean Lyness left the club still without a win in the competition after four years of trying.
- 7 September: Albion sign goalkeeper Stuart Tomlinson on a four-month deal from local rivals Port Vale.
- 12 September: Full-back Anthony O'Connor's loan deal is extended by five months to 31 January 2013.
- 14 September: Academy graduates Evan Garnett and Jack Green sign three-month loan deals with Hucknall Town.
- 25 September: Albion are knocked out of the League Cup in the 3rd Round by Bradford City. The Brewers lose 3–2 after extra time despite leading the game going into the 90th minute.
- 28 September: Gary Rowett makes completes the emergency loan signings of Rob Kiernan and Luke Rooney on one-month deals from Wigan Athletic and Swindon Town respectively.

=== October ===
- 18 October: BBC Sport announce the findings of their Price of Football survey, with Burton being named as the cheapest place to watch football in nPower League Two. Gillingham are named as the most expensive for the season.
- 21 October: The first round proper of the FA Cup is drawn. Burton are given a home tie against Conference North side Altrincham. The game will be played on Sunday 4 November due to a stewarding clash with the Derby County home fixture against Blackpool on Saturday 3 November.
- 23 October: Albion sign winger Jordan Chapell on an emergency one-month loan deal from Sheffield United. The new signing makes an immediate impact later in the day by marking his debut appearance with a goal against Port Vale. Albion also announce that the away fixture with Plymouth Argyle at Home Park is to be delayed by 24 hours to Wednesday 7 November due to both clubs' participation in the FA Cup.
- 26 October: The Brewers sign goalkeeper Mark Oxley on a one-month loan deal from Hull City following injuries to regular keeper Stuart Tomlinson and deputy Ross Atkins. Also on this day striker Matt Paterson signs a six-month extension to his current deal to see him through to the end of the season.

=== November ===
- 4 November: The second round proper of the FA Cup is drawn. Burton are given an away tie against Crewe Alexandra. However they will first have to overcome Altrincham in a First Round replay on 13 November at Moss Lane, having only managed a 3–3 draw against their Conference North opponents at home.
- 15 November: Burton confirm their place in the second round of the FA Cup with a 2–0 over Altrincham at Moss Lane, setting up an away tie with Crewe Alexandra at Gresty Road. The club also announce that local businessman Ian English makes his return to the board of directors.
- 20 November: The Brewers take 20-year-old striker Jacob Blyth on a loan deal from Leicester City until 12 January 2013.
- 21 November: Jordan Chapell's loan spell from Sheffield United is extended by a further month. This will see the midfielder stay with the Brewers until 23 December.

=== December ===
- 1 December: The Brewers defeat Crewe Alexandra 1–0 in the second round proper of the FA Cup at the Alexandra Stadium. The Brewers will now play in the third round proper for the first time in two seasons.
- 2 December: The third round proper of the FA Cup is drawn. In a repeat of the second round of the Capital One Cup, the Brewers are drawn away at Championship side Leicester City.
- 4 December: Sheffield United loanee Jordan Chapell is recalled from his loan spell with the Brewers by his parent club. The winger had originally been due to stay with the Brewers until 23 December.

== Squad statistics ==
=== Appearances and goals ===
Updated 10 December 2012

No.	Pos	Nat	Player	Total		League Two		FA Cup		League Cup		JP Trophy	
No.	Pos	Nat	Player	Apps	Goals	Apps	Goals	Apps	Goals	Apps	Goals	Apps	Goals
1	GK	(England) ENG	Ross Atkins	7	0	4+0	0	0+0	0	2+0	0	1+0	0
2	DF	(England) ENG	Andrew Corbett	4	0	0+2	0	0+0	0	0+1	0	1+0	0
3	DF	(England) ENG	Aaron Webster	5	1	0+1	0	1+0	0	1+1	1	1+0	0
4	DF	(England) ENG	Nathan Stanton	16	1	10+3	1	1+0	0	2+0	0	0+0	0
5	DF	(Scotland) SCO	Zander Diamond	26	4	21+0	3	2+0	1	3+0	0	0+0	0
6	MF	(Republic of Ireland) IRL	John McGrath	4	0	0+2	0	0+2	0	0+0	0	0+0	0
7	MF	(Jamaica) JAM	Cleveland Taylor	21	3	9+6	1	1+1	0	2+1	2	1+0	0
8	MF	(Northern Ireland) NIR	Robbie Weir	26	3	20+0	2	3+0	0	3+0	1	0+0	0
9	FW	(England) ENG	Justin Richards	13	1	4+7	1	0+0	0	0+1	0	0+1	0
10	FW	(Democratic Republic of the Congo) COD	Calvin Zola	21	9	14+3	6	3+0	3	1+0	0	0+0	0
11	MF	(England) ENG	Chris Palmer	14	2	7+2	0	2+0	1	2+0	1	1+0	0
12	FW	(Tanzania) TAN	Adi Yussuf	12	1	1+7	0	0+0	0	2+1	1	0+1	0
13	GK	(England) ENG	Stuart Tomlinson	11	0	10+0	0	0+0	0	1+0	0	0+0	0
14	DF	(Republic of Ireland) IRL	Damien McCrory	26	1	20+0	1	2+0	0	3+0	0	1+0	0
15	MF	(England) ENG	Matt Palmer	1	0	0+0	0	1+0	0	0+0	0	0+0	0
16	GK	(England) ENG	Dean Lyness	7	0	4+1	0	1+0	0	0+0	0	0+1	0
18	FW	(Scotland) SCO	Matt Paterson	19	3	11+5	3	0+1	0	0+1	0	1+0	0
19	MF	(Democratic Republic of the Congo) COD	Jacques Maghoma	24	6	20+0	4	3+0	1	1+0	1	0+0	0
20	DF	(Republic of Ireland) IRL	Anthony O'Connor	26	0	21+0	0	3+0	0	2+0	0	0+0	0
21	DF	(England) ENG	Marcus Holness	13	0	6+2	0	2+0	0	2+0	0	1+0	0
22	MF	(England) ENG	Jack Dyer	19	0	8+6	0	0+1	0	1+2	0	1+0	0
23	MF	(England) ENG	Lee Bell	27	1	19+1	1	3+0	0	3+0	0	1+0	0
24	FW	(England) ENG	Jacob Blyth	2	0	0+2	0	0+0	0	0+0	0	0+0	0
29	FW	(Northern Ireland) NIR	Billy Kee	23	5	10+7	4	1+1	0	2+1	1	1+0	0
Players played for Burton on loan who have returned to their parent club:
24	DF	(Republic of Ireland) IRL	Rob Kiernan	6	0	6+0	0	0+0	0	0+0	0	0+0	0
26	MF	(England) ENG	Luke Rooney	3	0	3+0	0	0+0	0	0+0	0	0+0	0
27	MF	(England) ENG	Jordan Chapell	4	1	1+1	1	2+0	0	0+0	0	0+0	0
30	GK	(England) ENG	Mark Oxley	5	0	3+0	0	2+0	0	0+0	0	0+0	0

=== Top scorers ===
Updated 10 December 2012

Place	Position	Nation	Number	Name	League Two	FA Cup	League Cup	JP Trophy	Total
1	FW	(Democratic Republic of the Congo)	10	Calvin Zola	6	3	0	0	9
2	MF	(Democratic Republic of the Congo)	19	Jacques Maghoma	4	1	1	0	6
3	FW	(Northern Ireland)	29	Billy Kee	4	0	1	0	5
4	DF	(Scotland)	5	Zander Diamond	3	1	0	0	4
5	MF	(Jamaica)	7	Cleveland Taylor	1	0	2	0	3
=	MF	(Northern Ireland)	8	Robbie Weir	2	0	1	0	3
=	FW	(England)	18	Matt Paterson	3	0	0	0	3
6	MF	(England)	11	Chris Palmer	0	1	1	0	2
7	FW	(England)	9	Justin Richards	1	0	0	0	1
=	DF	(Republic of Ireland)	14	Damien McCrory	1	0	0	0	1
=	MF	(England)	23	Lee Bell	1	0	0	0	1
=	DF	(England)	3	Aaron Webster	0	0	1	0	1
=	DF	(England)	4	Nathan Stanton	0	0	1	0	1
=	FW	(Tanzania)	12	Adi Yussuf	0	0	1	0	1
=	FW	(England)	27	Jordan Chapell	1	0	0	0	1
=				Own goals	1	0	0	0	1
				TOTALS	29	6	8	0	44

=== Disciplinary record ===
Updated 10 December 2012

Number	Nation	Position	Name	League Two		FA Cup		League Cup		JP Trophy		Total	
Number	Nation	Position	Name	Booked	Sent off (straight red)	Booked	Sent off (straight red)	Booked	Sent off (straight red)	Booked	Sent off (straight red)	Booked	Sent off (straight red)
8	(Northern Ireland)	MF	Robbie Weir	6	0	1	0	1	0	0	0	8	0
5	(Scotland)	DF	Zander Diamond	2	1	0	0	2	0	0	0	4	1
23	(England)	MF	Lee Bell	4	1	0	0	0	0	0	0	4	1
14	(Republic of Ireland)	DF	Damien McCrory	5	0	0	0	1	0	0	0	6	0
21	(England)	DF	Marcus Holness	1	0	1	0	1	1	0	0	3	1
22	(England)	MF	Jack Dyer	1	0	0	0	2	0	0	0	3	0
4	(England)	DF	Nathan Stanton	1	0	0	0	1	0	0	0	2	0
9	(England)	FW	Justin Richards	1	0	0	0	1	0	0	0	2	0
20	(England)	DF	Anthony O'Connor	2	0	0	0	0	0	0	0	2	0
29	(Northern Ireland)	FW	Billy Kee	2	0	0	0	0	0	0	0	2	0
7	(Jamaica)	MF	Cleveland Taylor	1	0	0	0	0	0	0	0	1	0
12	(Tanzania)	FW	Adi Yussuf	1	0	0	0	0	0	0	0	1	0
16	(England)	GK	Dean Lyness	1	0	0	0	0	0	0	0	1	0
18	(England)	FW	Matt Paterson	1	0	0	0	0	0	0	0	1	0
19	(Democratic Republic of the Congo)	MF	Jacques Maghoma	0	0	1	0	0	0	0	0	1	0
27	(England)	MF	Jordan Chapell	1	0	0	0	0	0	0	0	1	0
			TOTALS	30	2	3	0	9	1	0	0	42	3

== Club ==
=== Coaching and medical staff ===
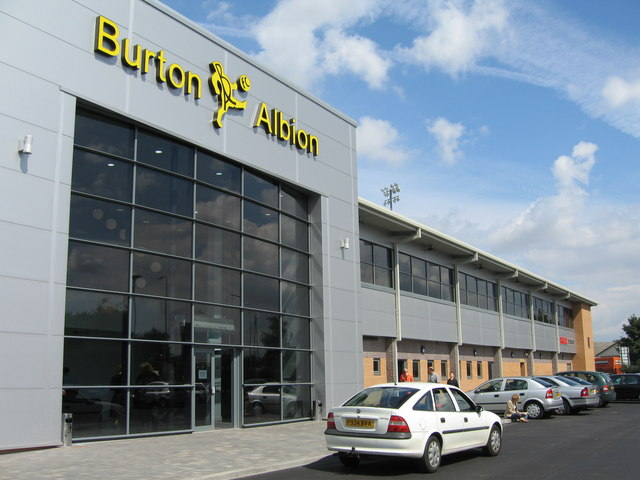
The Pirelli Stadium.

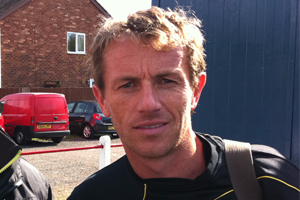
Gary Rowett begins his first full season as Burton manager.

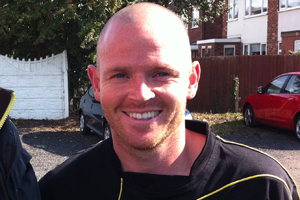
Club captain John McGrath.

Position	Staff
Manager	(England) Gary Rowett
Assistant manager	(England) Kevin Summerfield
Goalkeeping coach	(England) Kevin Poole
Youth team manager	(England) Mark Sale
Chief scout	(England) Paul Molesworth
Head physiotherapist	(England) James Rowland
Kit Manager	(England) Ray 'Rocky' Hudson

Last updated 22 August 2012.
Includes staff currently registered with club only.

Gary Rowett was named as the club's permanent manager on 11 May 2012, becoming the 30th manager in the club's history. This followed his tenure as caretaker manager after the sacking of the previous manager Paul Peschisolido. Kevin Poole and Mark Sale were retained in their respective roles as goalkeeping coach and youth team coach. Former Tranmere Rovers number two Kevin Summerfield is named as the club's new assistant manager, and Paul Molesworth is named as the club's new chief scout.

=== Players ===
Updated 10 December 2012.

No.	Name	Nationality	Position	Date of birth (age)	Previous club	Since	Apps	Goals	Ends	Transfer Fee	Notes
Goalkeepers
1	Ross Atkins	(England)	GK	3 November 1989 (age 36)	Derby County	(Loan)	55	0	June 2013	N/A	^{1}
13	Stuart Tomlinson	(England)	GK	22 May 1985 (age 40)	Port Vale	2012	12	0	January 2013	Free	^{5}
16	Dean Lyness	(England)	GK	20 July 1991 (age 34)	Kidderminster Harriers	2012	7	0	June 2014	Free	
	Kevin Poole	(England)	GK	21 July 1963 (age 62)	Derby County	2006	133	0	N/A	Free	^{6}
Defenders
2	Andrew Corbett	(England)	DF	20 February 1982 (age 44)	Nuneaton Borough	2003	362	12	June 2013	Nominal	
3	Aaron Webster	(England)	DF	19 December 1980 (age 45)	Youth	1998	582	101	June 2013	N/A	
4	Nathan Stanton	(England)	DF	6 May 1981 (age 44)	Rochdale	2010	70	1	June 2013	Free	
5	Zander Diamond	(Scotland)	DF	3 December 1985 (age 40)	Oldham Athletic	2012	26	4	June 2014	Free	
14	Damien McCrory	(Republic of Ireland)	DF	23 February 1990 (age 36)	Dagenham & Redbridge	2012	27	1	June 2014	Free	
20	Anthony O'Connor	(Republic of Ireland)	DF	25 February 1992 (age 34)	Blackburn Rovers	(Loan)	26	0	January 2013	N/A	
21	Marcus Holness	(England)	DF	8 December 1988 (age 37)	Rochdale	2012	13	0	June 2014	Free	
Midfielders
6	John McGrath	(Republic of Ireland)	MF	27 March 1980 (age 45)	Tamworth	2007	244	19	June 2013	Free	^{2}
7	Cleveland Taylor	(Jamaica)	MF	9 September 1983 (age 42)	St Johnstone	2011	78	10	June 2013	Free	
8	Robbie Weir	(Northern Ireland)	MF	9 December 1988 (age 37)	Tranmere Rovers	2012	26	3	June 2014	Free	
11	Chris Palmer	(England)	MF	16 October 1983 (age 42)	Gillingham	2011	50	5	June 2013	Free	
15	Matt Palmer	(England)	MF		Youth	2012	1	0	June 2013	N/A	
17	Jimmy Phillips	(England)	MF	20 September 1989 (age 36)	Stoke City	2009	90	2	June 2014	Free	
19	Jacques Maghoma	(Democratic Republic of the Congo)	MF	23 October 1987 (age 38)	Tottenham Hotspur	2009	146	20	June 2013	Free	
22	Jack Dyer	(England)	MF	11 December 1991 (age 34)	Aston Villa	2009	43	1	June 2013	Free	
23	Lee Bell	(England)	MF	26 January 1983 (age 43)	Crewe Alexandra	2012	45	2	June 2013	Free	^{3}
Forwards
9	Justin Richards	(England)	FW	16 October 1980 (age 45)	Port Vale	2011	50	13	June 2013	Free	
10	Calvin Zola	(Democratic Republic of the Congo)	FW	31 December 1984 (age 41)	Crewe Alexandra	2011	79	27	June 2014	Free	
12	Adi Yussuf	(Tanzania)	FW	3 October 1992 (age 33)	Leicester City	2011	29	2	June 2013	Free	
18	Matt Paterson	(Scotland)	FW	18 October 1989 (age 36)	Southend United	2012	19	3	June 2013	Free	
24	Jacob Blyth	(England)	FW	14 August 1992 (age 33)	Leicester City	(Loan)	2	0	January 2013	N/A	
25	Evan Garnett	(England)	FW	14 August 1994 (age 31)	N/A	2012	0	0	June 2013	N/A	
29	Billy Kee	(England)	FW	1 December 1990 (age 35)	Torquay United	2011	43	17	June 2015	20K	^{4}
Players Left Before End of Season
24	Rob Kiernan	(Republic of Ireland)	DF	13 January 1991 (age 35)	Wigan Athletic	(Loan)	6	0	October 2012	N/A	
26	Luke Rooney	(England)	MF	28 December 1990 (age 35)	Swindon Town	(Loan)	3	0	October 2012	N/A	
27	Jordan Chapell	(England)	MF	8 September 1991 (age 34)	Sheffield United	(Loan)	4	1	December 2012	N/A	
30	Mark Oxley	(England)	GK	28 September 1990 (age 35)	Hull City	(Loan)	5	0	November 2012	N/A	

Source: Burton Albion, Soccerbase
Ordered by position then squad number. Appearances (starts and substitute appearances) and goals include those in competitive matches in The Football League, The Football Conference, FA Cup, League Cup, Football League Trophy, FA Trophy and Conference League Cup for Burton Albion.
Notes
^{1} Appearances include previous loan spell in 2011–12.
^{2} Club Captain.
^{3} Appearances and goals include two previous loan spells.
^{4} Undisclosed fee reported by the Burton Mail to be £20K.
^{5} Appearances include previous loan spell in 2008.
^{6} Player/Goalkeeping coach. Oldest registered player in The Football League. Re-registered as player on 26 October 2012 due to injuries to Mark Oxley and Stuart Tomlinson.

=== Kit ===
Supplier: TAG Leisure
Sponsor(s): Mr. Cropper

Home	Away

Last updated: 24 August 2012.
Source: Burton Albion Club Shop

Burton's home kit was retained from the previous season, as was the Mr. Cropper sponsorship brand. TAG Leisure continue to manufacture the club's matchday and training attire. The new away kit was revealed on 14 July before the pre-season friendly with Aston Villa. It marks a return to the blue shirts, shorts and socks adopted by the team during the 2009 Conference National title-winning season. It will remain in use until the end of the 2013–14 league season.

=== Other information ===
Chairman	(England) Ben Robinson
Ground (capacity and dimensions)	Pirelli Stadium (6,912 / 110x72 metres)

Updated to match played 22 August 2012
Source: Burton Albion F.C.

== Results ==
=== Pre-season friendlies ===
14 July 2012	Burton Albion	1–2	Aston Villa	Pirelli Stadium
15:00	Weir 9'	(Report)	Holness 45'(og); Holman 83'	Attendance: 4,165; Referee: Mr. K. Friend

18 July 2012	Gresley	0–4	Burton Albion	Moat Ground, Swadlincote
19:45		(Report)	Richards 25'; Patterson 43'; Cowdrill 52'; Yussuf 73'	Attendance: 461; Referee: Mr. J. Thornhill

24 July 2012	Ilkeston F.C.	3–2	Burton Albion	New Manor Ground, Ilkeston
19:45	Watts 17', 66'; Wilson 35'	(Report)	Phillips 9'; Williams 64'	Attendance: 317; Referee: Mr. J. Thornhill

28 July 2012	Burton Albion	0–1	Derby County	Pirelli Stadium
15:00		(Report)	Jacobs 49'	Attendance: 3,026; Referee: Mr. D Coote

1 August 2012	Burton Albion	1–3	Leicester City	Pirelli Stadium
19:45	Weir 47'(pen)	(Report)	Schlupp 28'; Dyer 79'; Danns 88'	Referee: Mr. H. Webb

4 August 2012	Burton Albion	2–1	Walsall	Pirelli Stadium
15:00	Weir 29'; Kee 79'	(Report)	Grigg 6'	Attendance: 883; Referee: Mr. S. Rushton

7 August 2012	Burton Albion	0–1	Leeds United	Pirelli Stadium
19:45		(Report)	Varney 29'	Attendance: 3,127; Referee: Mr. O. Langford

=== League Two ===
18 August 2012	Rotherham United	3–0	Burton Albion	New York Stadium, Rotherham
15:00	Nardiello 5'(pen); Odejayi 11'; Pringle 75'	(Report)	Bell (yellow card) 58' (yellow-red card) 62'	Attendance: 11,441; Referee: Mr. P. Tierney

21 August 2012	Burton Albion	6–2	AFC Wimbledon	Pirelli Stadium
19:45	Taylor 8'; Kee 13'; Maghoma 14'; Richards 27'; Weir 53'; Diamond 68'	(Report)	Harrison 79'; Balkestein 80'	Attendance: 1,948; Referee: Mr. D. Bond

25 August 2012	Burton Albion	0–1	Fleetwood Town	Pirelli Stadium
15:00		(Report)	Howell 47'	Attendance: 2,349; Referee: Mr. T. Harrington

1 September 2012	Exeter City	3–0	Burton Albion	St. James Park, Exeter
15:00	Cureton 19'; Davies 41'; O'Flynn 89'	BBC Report; BAFC Report		Attendance: 3,707; Referee: Mr. C. Boyeson

8 September 2012	Rochdale	0–1	Burton Albion	Spotland, Rochdale
15:00	Cavanagh (yellow card) 70'	BBC Report; BAFC Report	Paterson 52'	Attendance: 2,199; Referee: Mr. A. Haines

15 September 2012	Burton Albion	4–0	Oxford United	Pirelli Stadium
15:00	Zola 25, 66'; Maghoma 45, 65'	BBC Report; BAFC Report	Wright (yellow card) 64'; Raynes (yellow card) 70'	Attendance: 2,389; Referee: Mr. R. Clark

19 September 2012	Burton Albion	3–1	York City	Pirelli Stadium
19:45	Bell 23'; Zola 65'; Paterson 90+1'; Richards (yellow card) 75'; Weir (yellow card) 90+5'	BBC Report; BAFC Report	McLaughlin 9'; Chambers (yellow card) 41'; Smith (yellow card) 87'	Attendance: 2,368; Referee: Mr. F. Graham

22 September 2012	Torquay United	1–1	Burton Albion	Plainmoor, Torquay
15:00	Howe 18'	BBC Report; BAFC Report	Zola 89'; McCrory (yellow card) 45+2'; Kee (yellow card) 90+2'	Attendance: 2,438; Referee: Mr. T. Robinson

29 September 2012	Burton Albion	3–3	Northampton Town	Pirelli Stadium
15:00	Zola 9'; Langmead 60' (og); Diamond 80'; Weir (yellow card) 34'; McCrory (yellow card) 82'	BBC Report; BAFC Report	Langmead 63'; Artell 75'; Nicholls 83'; Guttridge (yellow card) 54'	Attendance: 2,857; Referee: Mr. B. Malone

2 October 2012	Southend United	0–1	Burton Albion	Roots Hall, Southend-on-Sea
19:45	Spicer (red card) 13'; Assombalonga (yellow card) 82'; Timlin (yellow card) 90'	BBC Report; BAFC Report	Maghoma 90+1'; O'Connor (yellow card) 57'	Attendance: 4,150; Referee: Mr. K. Stroud

6 October 2012	Morecambe	0–0	Burton Albion	Globe Arena, Morecambe
15:00	Wright (yellow card) 90+4'	BBC Report; BAFC Report	Paterson (yellow card) 4'; Yussuf (yellow card) 63'; Weir (yellow card) 70'; McCrory (yellow card) 90'	Attendance: 1,585; Referee: Mr. S. Attwell

13 October 2012	Burton Albion	1–1	Bristol Rovers	Pirelli Stadium
15:00	Kee 50' (yellow card) 66'; Bell (yellow card) 59'; Dyer (yellow card) 81'	BBC Report; BAFC Report	Clarkson 37'; Richards (yellow card) 56'; Kenneth (yellow card) 74'	Attendance: 2,961; Referee: Mr. J. Simpson

20 October 2012	Gillingham	4–1	Burton Albion	MEMS Priestfield Stadium, Gillingham
15:00	Flanagan 22'; Fish 40'; Weston 59'; Martin 63'; Payne (yellow card) 9'; Dack (yellow card) 46'	BBC Report; BAFC Report	Diamond 54'; Weir (yellow card) 65'	Attendance: 7,268; Referee: Mr. L. Collins

23 October 2012	Burton Albion	1–1	Port Vale	Pirelli Stadium
19:45	Chappell 73' (yellow card) 84'; Diamond (yellow card) 37'; Bell (yellow card) 41'	BBC Report; BAFC Report	Williamson 75'; McDonald (yellow card) 39'	Attendance: 3,975; Referee: Mr. G. Salisbury

27 October 2012	Burton Albion	1–0	Bradford City	Pirelli Stadium
15:00	Zola 80'; Bell (yellow card) 38'	BBC Report; BAFC Report	Ravenhill (red card) 32'; Doyle (yellow card) 84'; McArdle (yellow card) 87'	Attendance: 2,791; Referee: Mr. A. D'Urso

7 November 2012	Plymouth Argyle	1–2	Burton Albion	Home Park, Plymouth
19:45	Cowan-Hall 49'	BBC Report; BAFC Report	Stanton 74' (yellow card) 59'; Weir 79'; Taylor (yellow card) 31'; McCrory (yellow card) 53'	Attendance: 5,219; Referee: Mr. D. Eaton

10 November 2012	Cheltenham Town	1–0	Burton Albion	The Abbey Business Stadium, Cheltenham
15:00	Zebroski 86'; Harrad (yellow card) 90+5'	BBC Report; BAFC Report	Holness (yellow card) 73'; Diamond (yellow card) 90+3'	Attendance: 2,804; Referee: Mr. G. Scott

17 November 2012	Burton Albion	3–2	Dagenham & Redbridge	Pirelli Stadium
15:00	McCrory 51'; Paterson 53'; Kee 79'; Lyness (yellow card) 28'	BBC Report; BAFC Report	Gayle 29'; Williams 78'; Ogogo (yellow card) 33'; Ilesanmi (yellow card) 80'	Attendance: 2,369; Referee: Mr. T. Kettle

20 November 2012	Burton Albion	0–1	Aldershot Town	Pirelli Stadium
19:45	O'Connor (yellow card) 45+1'	BBC Report; BAFC Report	López 4'; Young (yellow card) 79'	Attendance: 1,712; Referee: Mr. K. Wright

24 November 2012	Wycombe Wanderers	3–0	Burton Albion	Adams Park, High Wycombe
15:00	McClure 13', 63'; Grant 57'(pen); Azeez (yellow card) 89'	BBC Report; BAFC Report	Diamond (red card) 56'; McCrory (yellow card) 83'	Attendance: 3,191; Referee: Mr. D. Webb

9 December 2012	Burton Albion	1–0	Accrington Stanley	Pirelli Stadium
15:00	Kee 10'; Weir (yellow card) 48'	BBC Report; BAFC Report	Nsiala (yellow card) 90+2'	Attendance: 2,530; Referee: Mr. P. Gibbs

16 December 2012	Chesterfield	1–1	Burton Albion	Proact Stadium
15:00	M. Richards 74'; Hird (yellow card) 67'; Lester (red card) 90+3'	BBC Report; BAFC Report	Maghoma 34'; Bell (yellow card) 21'	Attendance: 5,741; Referee: Mr. G. Eltrigham

21 December 2012	Barnet	3–2	Burton Albion	Underhill Stadium
19:45	Holmes 42', 53' (pen.), 66'; Kamdjo (yellow card) 31'; Davids (yellow card) 57'	BBC Report; BAFC Report	Kee 16' (pen.); Maghoma 90+5' (pen.); McCrory (yellow card) 29'; Taylor (yellow card) 58'; Dyer (yellow card) 59'; Weir (yellow card) 82'	Attendance: 1,751; Referee: Mr. A. Davies

==== League Two results summary ====
Overall								Home						Away					
Pld	W	D	L	GF	GA	GD	Pts	W	D	L	GF	GA	GD	W	D	L	GF	GA	GD
46	22	10	14	71	65	+6	76	17	3	3	49	23	+26	5	7	11	22	42	−20

Last updated: 27 April 2013.
Source: Burton Albion F.C.

=== FA Cup ===
4 November 2012	Burton Albion	3–3	Altrincham	Pirelli Stadium
15:00	Diamond 53'; Maghoma 77'; Zola 90+3'; Weir (yellow card) 67'	BBC Report; BAFC Report	Rodgers 29'; Stanton 34' (og); McCrory 85' (og); Densmore (yellow card) 38'; Reeves (yellow card) 75'	Attendance: 1,989; Referee: Mr. M. Bull

15 November 2012	Altrincham	0–2	Burton Albion	Moss Lane, Altrincham
19:45		BBC Report; BAFC Report	Palmer 65'; Zola 75'	Attendance: 2,428; Referee: Mr. C. Boyeson

1 December 2012	Crewe Alexandra	0–1	Burton Albion	Alexandra Stadium, Crewe
15:00	Ellis (yellow card) 70'; Tootle (yellow card) 90+3'	BBC Report; BAFC Report	Zola 5'; Holness (yellow card) 78'; Maghoma (yellow card) 81'	Attendance: 3,065; Referee: Mr. G. Salisbury

5 January 2013	Leicester City	2–0	Burton Albion	King Power Stadium, Leicester
15:00	Wood 3' de Laet 21'			Attendance: 14,463; Referee: Mr. A. D'Urso

=== League Cup ===
11 August 2012	Sheffield United	2–2 (4–5 p)	Burton Albion	Bramall Lane, Sheffield
15:00	Blackman 51'; Collins 105'	(Report)	Yussuf 34'; Taylor 97'; Holness (yellow card) 105' (yellow-red card) 105+1'	Attendance: 7,073
	Penalties
	Quinn (penalty scored); Collins (penalty scored); Maguire (penalty missed); McDonald (penalty scored); McMahon (penalty scored); Doyle (penalty missed)		(penalty scored) Weir; (penalty missed) Bell; (penalty scored) McCrory; (penalty scored) Webster; (penalty scored) Richards; (penalty scored) Taylor

28 August 2012	Leicester City	2–4	Burton Albion	King Power Stadium, Leicester
19:45	Knockaert 60'; Futács 87'	BBC Report; BAFC Report	Palmer 20'; Taylor 53'; Weir 64' (pen.); Maghoma 68'; Dyer (yellow card) 72'	Attendance: 8,560; Referee: Mr. D. Drysdale

25 September 2012	Bradford City	3–2 (a.e.t.)	Burton Albion	Coral Windows Stadium, Bradford
19:45	Wells 83', 90'; Darby 115'; Connell (yellow card) 53'	BBC Report; BAFC Report	Kee 18'; Webster 29'; Weir (yellow card) 69'; McCrory (yellow card) 76'; Dyer (yellow card) 78'; Diamond (yellow card) 117'	Attendance: 4,178; Referee: Mr. N. Miller

=== Johnstone's Paint Trophy ===
4 September 2012	Coventry City	0–0 (10–9 p)	Burton Albion	Ricoh Arena, Coventry
19:45		BBC Report; BAFC Report		Attendance: 5,437; Referee: Mr. O. Langford
	Penalties
	McSheffrey (penalty scored); Baker (penalty scored); McGoldrick (penalty scored); Kilbane (penalty scored); Elliott (penalty scored); Daniels (penalty scored); Brown (penalty scored); Hussey (penalty scored); Christie (penalty scored); Wood (penalty missed); Murphy (penalty scored)		(penalty scored) Taylor; (penalty scored) Palmer; (penalty scored) McCrory; (penalty scored) Webster; (penalty scored) Richards; (penalty scored) Bell; (penalty scored) Yussuf; (penalty scored) Dyer; (penalty scored) Corbett; (penalty missed) Holness; (penalty missed) Lyness

=== Birmingham Senior Cup ===
Appearances and goals not included in club statistics.

8 October 2012	Coleshill Town	2–4	Burton Albion	Pack Meadow, Coleshill
19:45	Travis 85'; Carter 90'	BAFC Report	Slade 5'; Kee 28'; Yussuf 68', 79'	Attendance: 67; Referee: Mr. S. Postin

4 December 2012	Hednesford Town	5–4	Burton Albion	Keys Park, Hednesford
19:45	Lennon 25', 89'; Durrell 37' (p); O'Connor 47'; Craven 75'		Kee 13'; Richards 66'; McGrath 67', 82'	Attendance: 133; Referee: Mr. B. Cooke

== Transfers ==
Players transferred in
Date	Pos.	Name	Previous club	Fee	Ref.
31 May 2012	MF	(Northern Ireland) Robbie Weir	(England) Tranmere Rovers	Free	
5 June 2012	DF	(Scotland) Zander Diamond	(England) Oldham Athletic	Free	
27 June 2012	DF	(Republic of Ireland) Damien McCrory	(England) Dagenham & Redbridge	Free	
16 July 2012	DF	(England) Marcus Holness	(England) Rochdale	Free	
27 July 2012	GK	(England) Dean Lyness	(England) Kidderminster Harriers	Free	
31 July 2012	MF	(England) Lee Bell	(England) Crewe Alexandra	Free	
15 August 2012	FW	(Scotland) Matt Paterson	(England) Southend United	Free	
7 September 2012	GK	(England) Stuart Tomlinson	(England) Port Vale	Free	
Players loaned in
Date from	Pos.	Name	From	Date to	Ref.
27 July 2012	GK	(England) Ross Atkins	(England) Derby County	End of Season	
15 August 2012	DF	(Republic of Ireland) Anthony O'Connor	(England) Blackburn Rovers	31 January 2013	
28 September 2012	DF	(Republic of Ireland) Rob Kiernan	(England) Wigan Athletic	28 October 2012	
28 September 2012	MF	(England) Luke Rooney	(England) Swindon Town	28 October 2012	
23 October 2012	MF	(England) Jordan Chapell	(England) Sheffield United	23 December 2012	
26 October 2012	GK	(England) Mark Oxley	(England) Hull City	26 November 2012	
20 November 2012	FW	(England) Jacob Blyth	(England) Leicester City	12 January 2013	
Players loaned out
Date from	Pos.	Name	To	Date to	Ref.
14 September 2012	DF	(England) Jack Green	(England) Hucknall Town	15 December 2012	
14 September 2012	FW	(England) Evan Garnett	(England) Hucknall Town	15 December 2012	
Players released
Date	Pos.	Name	Subsequent Club	Date Joined	Ref.
9 May 2012	GK	(England) James Wren	(England) Tamworth	20 July 2012	
9 May 2012	DF	(England) Danny Blanchett	(England) York City	2 July 2012	
9 May 2012	DF	(England) Kristian Ramsey-Dixon	(England) Sutton Coldfield Town	16 August 2012	
9 May 2012	MF	(Argentina) Andres Gurrieri	(England) Plymouth Argyle	4 August 2012	
9 May 2012	DF	(Ghana) Patrick Ada	(England) Ebbsfleet United	20 July 2012	
15 June 2012	DF	(England) Ryan Austin	(England) Kidderminster Harriers	5 July 2012	
15 June 2012	DF	(Wales) Tony James	(Wales) Newport County	5 July 2012	
15 June 2012	FW	(England) Greg Pearson	(England) Grimsby Town	9 July 2012	
15 June 2012	MF	(England) Adam Bolder	(England) Harrogate Town	20 July 2012	
8 July 2012	GK	(England) Stuart Tomlinson	Retired		
