= Tim Deasy =

English footballer

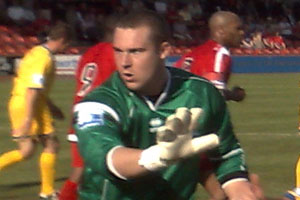
- Deasy in 2007

Personal information
- Full name: Timothy Deasy
- Date of birth: 1 October 1985 (age 41)
- Place of birth: Salford, England
- Position: Goalkeeper

Senior career*
Years	Team	Apps	(Gls)
2003–2006	Macclesfield Town	3	(0)
2006–2007	Stockport County	1	(0)
2007–2010	Barrow	93	(0)
2010–2012	Gateshead	55	(0)
2012–2013	Bradford Park Avenue	19	(0)
2013–2014	Northwich Victoria		
2014	Altrincham	0	(0)
2014–2015	Northwich Victoria		
2015–2016	Altrincham	41	(0)
2016	Guiseley	1	(0)
2016–2018	Altrincham	21	(0)
- * Club domestic league appearances and goals

Timothy Deasy (born 1 October 1985) is an English former footballer who played as a goalkeeper.

== Career ==
Born in Salford, Greater Manchester, Deasy began his career with Macclesfield Town in League Two and made three first team appearances for them before being released in the summer of 2006. He then joined Stockport County but left Edgeley Park without playing a first team game.

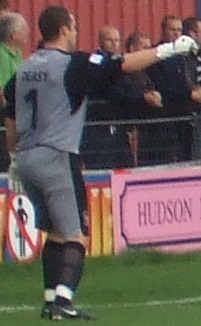
Deasy playing for Barrow in 2008

He joined Barrow in August 2007 after appearing successfully in a number of pre-season games. He quickly made a name for himself by saving two penalties in one game at Tamworth on 15 September 2007. He played a major part in Barrow's promotion winning season from the Conference North to the Conference National after just one season, and cemented his place as Barrow's first choice goalkeeper.

In Barrow's two seasons in the Conference, Deasy was in and out of the team, competing first with Alan Martin and later with Stuart Tomlinson for the goalkeeping position. He played a vital role in preventing an onslaught against Sunderland on 3 January 2010, but they went on to lose the match 3–0. He was praised by Steve Bruce about keeping the score down. After failing to regularly gain first team football, Deasy chose to leave the club at the end of the 2009–10 season.

On 6 August 2010, Deasy signed for Gateshead on an initial three-month deal, making his debut against Kettering Town on 14 August 2010. On 27 October 2010, Deasy signed a contract extension until the end of the 2010–11 season. On 28 April 2011, it was announced that Deasy had turned down an improved contract for the following season, but 6 days later Gateshead announced that he had accepted a new contract. Deasy was released by Gateshead on 30 April 2012.

On 4 August 2012, Deasy signed for Bradford Park Avenue. He left the club in April 2013.

Having left Bradford Park Avenue, Deasy signed for Northwich Victoria in the summer of 2013, moving on to Altrincham in February 2014. He made no appearances for the club, rejoining Northwich Victoria for the 2014–15 season.

In September 2016 he rejoined Altrincham again. He retired from football at the end of the 2017–18 season, making his final appearance as a substitute against Hednesford Town in the final game of the season.

== Career statistics ==
As of 28 October 2012

Club	Season	League^{[A]}		FA Cup		League Cup		Other^{[B]}		Total	
Club	Season	Apps	Goals	Apps	Goals	Apps	Goals	Apps	Goals	Apps	Goals
Macclesfield Town	2003–04	0	0	0	0	0	0	0	0	0	0
Macclesfield Town	2004–05	0	0	0	0	0	0	0	0	0	0
Macclesfield Town	2005–06	3	0	0	0	0	0	0	0	3	0
Macclesfield Town	Total	3	0	0	0	0	0	0	0	3	0
Stockport County	2006–07	0	0	0	0	0	0	0	0	0	0
Barrow	2007–08	42	0	6	0	0	0	8	0	56	0
Barrow	2008–09	27	0	1	0	0	0	0	0	28	0
Barrow	2009–10	24	0	1	0	0	0	0	0	25	0
Barrow	Total	93	0	8	0	0	0	8	0	109	0
Gateshead	2010–11	41	0	2	0	0	0	5	0	48	0
Gateshead	2011–12	15	0	0	0	0	0	5	0	20	0
Gateshead	Total	55	0	2	0	0	0	10	0	67	0
Bradford Park Avenue	2012–13	12	0	3	0	0	0	0	0	15	0
Career totals		163	0	13	0	0	0	18	0	194	0

A. The "League" column constitutes appearances and goals in the Football League and Football Conference.
B. The "Other" column constitutes appearances and goals in the Conference League Cup, FA Trophy and play-offs.

== Honours ==
- Conference North play-offs: 2007–08
- FA Trophy: 2009–10
