= Stuart Tomlinson =

British wrestler and football player (born 1985)

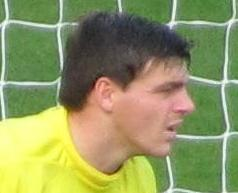
- Tomlinson playing for Port Vale in 2010.

Personal information
- Full name: Stuart Charles Tomlinson
- Date of birth: 22 May 1985 (age 41)
- Place of birth: Chester, England
- Height: 6 ft 0 in (1.83 m)
- Position: Goalkeeper

Youth career
- 2001–2003: Crewe Alexandra

Senior career*
Years	Team	Apps	(Gls)
2003–2009	Crewe Alexandra	20	(0)
2004	→ Stafford Rangers (loan)		
2008	→ Burton Albion (loan)	1	(0)
2009–2010	Barrow	20	(0)
2010–2012	Port Vale	74	(0)
2012–2013	Burton Albion	25	(0)
2017	Altrincham	6	(0)
Total		146	(0)
- * Club domestic league appearances and goals

Stuart Charles Tomlinson (born 22 May 1985) is an English former professional wrestler and professional footballer who played as a goalkeeper.

As a footballer, Tomlinson progressed from the Crewe Alexandra youth team to turn professional in 2003. He spent the next six years with the club, spending part of 2004 on loan at Stafford Rangers, and playing once on loan for Burton Albion in 2008. He spent the 2009–10 campaign at Conference club Barrow, where he shared goalkeeping responsibilities with Tim Deasy. He then signed with Port Vale and was favoured ahead of Chris Martin for the 2010–11 and 2011–12 campaigns before choosing to leave the club in July 2012. He signed with Burton Albion in September 2012 but retired through injury in July 2013.

In December 2013, Tomlinson began training as a professional wrestler on a developmental contract with WWE. In November 2014, he made his debut at a NXT live event, under the ring name Hugo Knox. In September 2016, he was released from his contract. In March 2017, Tomlinson briefly returned to football to play for Altrincham.

== Football career ==
=== Crewe Alexandra ===
Having graduated through the club's youth academy, Tomlinson made his senior debut for Crewe Alexandra in a Second Division clash with Oldham Athletic on 25 January 2003, replacing Danny Milosevic on 51 minutes after the Australian suffered an injury. He conceded a goal to Chris Armstrong after his view was obscured by a group of players, though Crewe ran out 3–1 winners at Boundary Park. At the end of the season he signed his first professional contract, and Crewe were promoted into the First Division as runners up in the Second Division.

His second game came on 17 March 2004 at the Boleyn Ground; he replaced Clayton Ince after 86 minutes with the score 4–2 to West Ham United after Ince was stretchered off with a knee injury. The 18-year-old held his nerve in front of over 30,000 spectators and no goals were scored in the brief period he was on the pitch. Later in the year he had a loan spell at local non-League side Stafford Rangers.

After recovering from a twisted ankle, Tomlinson's next senior game was at Sincil Bank on 23 August 2005, where he replaced loanee Ben Williams at half-time. Lincoln City knocked the "Railwaymen" out of the League Cup, putting two past Williams and three past Tomlinson for a 5–2 victory. His first start came in the FA Cup third round clash at Deepdale on 7 January 2006, the home side coming out 2–1 winners. He played his first Championship game on 28 January, replacing Ross Turnbull at half-time; Watford put two past each man for a 4–1 win. After signing a one-year contract extension in March, Tomlinson got his first league start on 30 April, as Crewe beat Millwall 4–2, Ben May scoring both of the "Lions" goals.

In May 2006, Burton Albion requested to sign Tomlinson to a season-long loan. The move was delayed after Tomlinson picked up a calf injury, before he managed to join Burton in time for a pre-season friendly with Sheffield Wednesday. However, Crewe reconsidered the loan deal and so Nigel Clough instead signed aged veteran Kevin Poole. Clough was still keen to sign Tomlinson, with the saga continuing well into the season, though no deal was made. Tomlinson picked up his first senior clean sheet on 22 August 2006, during a 3–0 win at Grimsby Town's Blundell Park in the League Cup first round. The Crewe website described a "heroic effort" from Tomlinson in the Football League Trophy tie with Rochdale on 31 October, as he managed to three of Rochdale's four penalties (the penalty he did not save was a miss). Dario Gradi said: "Stuart is outstanding on penalties because he is positive and doesn't flop over". He went on to play seven League One games, and also made one appearance in the FA Cup. However, he did not play in the 2007 end of the season, partly due to a tore groin that kept him out of action for several weeks. In the summer, there was once again talk of a possible loan move to Burton.

He was only used by Steve Holland once throughout the 2007–08 season, playing in a 1–1 draw with Chester City in the Football League Trophy on 4 September; Chester won the game 4–3 on penalties. Not long after this he was on the sidelines with a broken thumb. In February, Tomlinson finally joined Conference club Burton Albion on a one-month loan. He played 90 minutes for "Brewers" in a 3–1 defeat to Histon on 1 March, and was forced to make numerous saves. He played no further part of Burton's season after he sustained an injury to his cruciate ligaments.

After six months of rehab, he recovered earlier than expected. His 2008–09 season started on 25 November, as Gradi gave him a start at the Walkers Stadium, where Leicester City won 2–1. The next month he played six games, keeping four clean sheets (against Carlisle United, Cheltenham Town, Swindon Town and Millwall). However, he attracted criticism from his manager at the end of January following heavy defeats to Northampton Town and Peterborough United, and was subsequently dropped. New manager Gudjon Thordarson told him that he would not be offered a new contract at the end of the season, thus ending Tomlinson's long association with the club.

=== Barrow ===
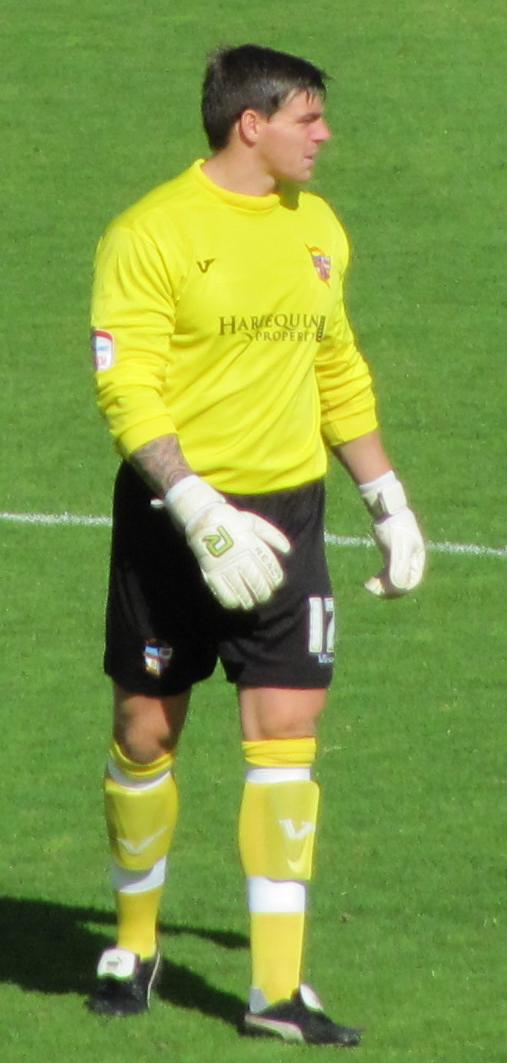
Tomlinson playing against Aldershot Town at Vale Park in September 2010.

In July 2009, he joined Port Vale for pre-season training, playing 45 minutes of a pre-season friendly. Micky Adams considered signing Tomlinson up whilst first choice keeper Joe Anyon was out injured. He impressed on his trial and would have been signed to a contract if the cash-strapped club could find the finance, instead Adams considered offering Tomlinson non-contract terms. However, Tomlinson left the club to search for a more permanent offer elsewhere. In August 2009, he joined Barrow of the Conference, just two days before the start of their season. Sharing first-team duties with Tim Deasy, he appeared 27 times for Barrow in the 2009–10 campaign. He also won the FA Trophy with the club, appearing in the final at Wembley Stadium, where the "Bluebirds" beat Stevenage Borough 2–1.

=== Port Vale ===
Tomlinson chose not to renew his Barrow contract at the end of the season, and instead signed a one-year contract at Port Vale in May 2010. Anyon had at by this time left Vale Park for Lincoln City, and Tomlinson was brought into provide competition for teenager Chris Martin. This required him to accept a lower wage than he would have got at Barrow.

He is a keeper with tremendous agility, who is renowned for his shot-stopping, and we have the benefit of knowing all about him after working with him for a short spell last season. Stuart is aware that he will have tough competition for the number one spot in Chris Martin, but he is ready for the challenge and looking forward to being back in the Football League.

– Micky Adams on Tomlinson.

Adams surprised many by selecting Tomlinson as the goalkeeper in the opening game of the season, and Tomlinson rewarded his manager by keeping a clean sheet. Tomlinson praised his defence for his solid start to the season. With five clean sheets in his first ten games, Tomlinson was offered a one-year contract extension in September 2010. Two months later he was reported in the Daily Star and the Daily Mirror to be a £250,000 transfer target for Sheffield United and Queens Park Rangers. Adams dismissed such speculation with the comment "that amount of money wouldn't buy Stuart's left hand". Sent off on New Year's Day after a collision with Rotherham United's Marcus Marshall, Tomlinson lost his place in the first XI due to injury and suspension, but then won back his place after Martin conceded a comical own goal in a 3–1 defeat to Stevenage on 22 February. It was an eventful return for Tomlinson, who broke the story of Jim Gannon and Geoff Horsfield's bust-up on the pre-match coach trip to Aldershot via Twitter. The game itself was also eventful, as Tomlinson gave away a penalty, which he then saved, only to leave the pitch due to a hip injury. Martin regained his first-team place after the game, only to be replaced by Tomlinson at half-time during a 2–1 loss at home to Oxford United on 12 March, after Martin committed another blunder.

Following the return of Micky Adams as Port Vale manager, Tomlinson held on to his first-team place at the start of the 2011–12 season, though Martin was used in cup games. Neither Tomlinson or Martin could find the consistency to secure their first-team place though; Tomlinson conceded twelve goals in his first seven games of the season, whilst Martin conceded ten times in his first five games. Assistant manager Mark Grew told the media that "they've both been disappointing". On 29 October, Tomlinson was embarrassed to be caught off his line by Oxford United's Peter Leven, who found the net with a 'sensational 45 yards (41 m) strike'. Adams said "...in the division, he's the only player who would have scored that... [but] you have to question the keeper's starting position." He was still preferred to Martin though, and only a thigh injury kept him out of two league games in January. He returned to the first-team, and was heading for a third consecutive clean sheet on 14 February when he committed an "injury-time howler" to allow Bradford City a share of the points at Valley Parade. On 10 March he spilled a cross to hand Barnet striker Ben May an easy winner at Vale Park. He vowed to improve his consistency, saying "I'm a pretty confident person and it will take a lot to stop me bouncing back." At the end of the season he rejected the club's offer of a new contract, and his departure was announced on 3 July. He said that he was "not particularly worried" about his free agent status and that he would turn down similar offers from other clubs and wait until as late as the start of the following season until the "right opportunity" came about.

=== Burton Albion ===
In September 2012, Tomlinson signed a four-month contract with Burton Albion, having previously been on trial at Preston North End. He joined the "Brewers" after manager Gary Rowett was dissatisfied with the performances of Ross Atkins and Dean Lyness. After keeping a clean sheet on his debut, in a 1–0 win over Rochdale at Spotland on 8 September, assistant manager Kevin Summerfield said that "the biggest difference for me was that we were playing the game in their half and they were defending corners because he [Tomlinson] can kick the ball so far up the pitch". He was aiming for a longer stay at the Pirelli Stadium, but a knee injury sustained in a home draw with former club Port Vale left him sidelined for up to six months. He recovered to full fitness in half that time, and signed a new contract in February to extend his stay at Burton until summer 2014. Burton reached the play-offs at the end of the 2012–13 season, but were defeated 5–4 by Bradford City at the semi-final stage. Tomlinson retired in July 2013 after surgeons advised him that scar tissue damage and a tear in his anterior cruciate ligament (ACL) meant that his left knee was in poor shape and was vulnerable to further damage.

=== Altrincham ===
In March 2017, and after almost four years away from the sport, Tomlinson returned to football to play for Altrincham; he was signed to cover for former Barrow teammate Tim Deasy, who was ruled out injured for at least a month. The "Robins" were relegated after finishing bottom of the National League North at the end of the 2016–17 season.

== Style of play ==
A goalkeeper with a flair for shot-stopping, Tomlinson could kick the ball with either foot. Due to his muscular physique, he was given the nickname "the Tank".

Stuart's a great lad who works really hard in training... he's got a great physique and commands his box very well. Keepers can always make mistakes, but he made very few for us. He's not got a weak point in his game. He's a good all-round keeper, which is why we were lucky to get him last summer.

– Barrow manager David Bayliss upon losing Tomlinson to Port Vale in June 2010.

== Professional wrestling career ==
Stuart Tomlinson
Professional wrestling career
- Ring name: Hugo Knox
- Billed height: 6 ft 0 in (1.83 m)
- Billed weight: 246 lb (112 kg)
- Trained by: WWE Performance Center
- Debut: 8 November 2014
- Retired: 30 September 2016

=== WWE (2013–2016) ===
In December 2013, Tomlinson travelled to the United States to be trained as a professional wrestler on a developmental contract by WWE. He was assigned to the WWE Performance Center, where he took the ring name Hugo Knox. He stated that "Hugo Knox is a lively, high-energy and bubbly guy" with "the smallest polka dot pants possible!". He made his in-ring debut for WWE's developmental territory, NXT, at a live event on 8 November 2014. On 30 September 2016, it was reported that Tomlinson had been released from his WWE contract.

== Modelling career ==
Tomlinson has worked as a professional model, appearing on the front cover of Men's Health.

== Career statistics ==
Appearances and goals by club, season and competition
Club	Season	League			FA Cup		League Cup		Other		Total	
Club	Season	Division	Apps	Goals	Apps	Goals	Apps	Goals	Apps	Goals	Apps	Goals
Crewe Alexandra	2002–03	Second Division	1	0	0	0	0	0	0	0	1	0
Crewe Alexandra	2003–04	First Division	1	0	0	0	0	0	0	0	1	0
Crewe Alexandra	2004–05	Championship	0	0	0	0	0	0	0	0	0	0
Crewe Alexandra	2005–06	League One	2	0	1	0	1	0	0	0	4	0
Crewe Alexandra	2006–07	League One	7	0	1	0	1	0	1 (Note: Appearance(s) in the Football League Trophy.)	0	10	0
Crewe Alexandra	2007–08	League One	0	0	0	0	0	0	1	0	1	0
Crewe Alexandra	2008–09	League One	9	0	2	0	0	0	0	0	11	0
Crewe Alexandra	Total		20	0	4	0	2	0	2	0	28	0
Burton Albion (loan)	2007–08	Conference National	1	0	—		—		—		1	0
Barrow	2009–10	Conference National	20	0	3	0	—		0	0	23	0
Port Vale	2010–11	League Two	36	0	4	0	2	0	0	0	42	0
Port Vale	2011–12	League Two	38	0	1	0	0	0	0	0	39	0
Port Vale	Total		74	0	5	0	2	0	0	0	81	0
Burton Albion	2012–13	League Two	25	0	0	0	1	0	2 (Note: Appearance(s) in the play-offs.)	0	28	0
Altrincham	2016–17	National League North	6	0	—		—		—		6	0
Career total (Note: Stafford Rangers statistics unavailable.)			146	0	12	0	5	0	4	0	167	0

== Honours ==
Crewe Alexandra

- Football League Second Division second-place promotion: 2002–03

Barrow

- FA Trophy: 2010
