= 2008–09 Derby County F.C. season =

Derby County F.C.
2008–09 season
- President and Chief Executive: Tom Glick
- Club chairman: Andy Appleby
- Manager: Paul Jewell (until December); Nigel Clough
- Championship: 18th
- FA Cup: 5th Round
- League Cup: Semi-finals
- Player of the Year: Rob Hulse
- Young Player of the Year: Miles Addison
- Top goalscorer: League: Rob Hulse (15); All: Rob Hulse (18)
- Highest home attendance: 33,079 v Wolverhampton Wanderers, Championship (13 April 2009)
- Lowest home attendance: 10,091 v Lincoln, League Cup 1st Round, (12 August 2008)
- Average home league attendance: 29,445
Home colours	Away colours	Third colours

The 2008–09 season was Derby County's 110th season in the Football League. It is their 41st season in the second division of English football and their first season in the second tier since the 2006–07 season. They were relegated from the FA Premier League in the 2007–08 season.

Despite relegation from the Premier League the previous season hopes had been high of an immediate return, especially after manager Paul Jewell's summer reconstruction of the squad seeing 16 players come in and 12 leave. However, things did not go to plan and the club spent the majority of the season in the lower reaches of the table. They were bottom of the league going into the August international break, after a 2–0 defeat away to Barnsley left the club with a single point from the first four games of the season. A 2–1 win over Sheffield United was the club's first league win in almost a year, bringing to an end of a 38-game winless sequence, and a run of just one defeat in 11, with 5 wins, lifted the club to the season high of ninth. Form soon dipped again and, after a run of just two wins in 11 matches which left the club 18th in the table, Jewell quit as manager on 28 December 2008 after just over a year in the job. He left with a record of just 13 wins in 58 matches, though he did take the club to their first major cup semi-final in over 30 years when the club reached the League Cup semi-final, where they lost 4–3 on aggregate to eventual winners Manchester United.

His replacement was Nigel Clough, manager of non-league Burton Albion and son of the club's former manager Brian. Despite overseeing two defeats in his first two games, Clough soon turned the club's form around, taking them to the 5th round of the FA Cup and just three defeats in 13 matches, a run which included four consecutive wins. A run of three consecutive defeats in mid April meant that survival was not guaranteed until the penultimate game of the season when Player of the Year Rob Hulse scored the winner in a 1–0 win over Charlton Athletic at Pride Park.

== Review ==
=== Pre-season ===
Following the final day of the 2007–08 season, Jewell publicly announced his displeasure with the current squad, promising drastic changes. Within four weeks of the close of the season Derby confirmed five new signings, namely Plymouth defender Paul Connolly, Doncaster midfielder Paul Green, Watford F.C. defender Jordan Stewart and Nottingham Forest winger Kris Commons on frees. Watford's Nathan Ellington joined on a season-long loan (with a view to a permanent deal). In addition to these, the club signed out of contract Tranmere youngster Steve Davies on 12 June 2008 on a Bosman (although as he is under 24, a tribunal fee was set at £275k, with an additional £450k based on appearances and promotion). West Bromwich Albion's Martin Albrechtsen joined for free on 30 June 2008, and Stockport striker Liam Dickinson signed for £750k on 1 July 2008. Sheffield United striker Rob Hulse followed for £1.75m on 21 July 2008, the same day a season long loan deal for FC Porto and Poland international midfielder Przemyslaw Kazmierczak was finalised. On 7 August, just two days before the start of the new season, the club completed its eleventh and twelfth signings of pre-season, in the shape of Swiss-born Serbian U-19 international Aleksandar Prijović, who rejected a new deal with Parma to join the club, for free and Latvian international midfielder Andrejs Perepļotkins on a season long loan from Skonto FC Rīga after impressing on trial at the club. Finally, on 19 August the club signed Dutch attacking midfielder Nacer Barazite on loan until 31 December 2008 from Arsenal.

These thirteen signings all came in addition to Australian midfielder Ruben Zadkovich, who was signed in March. There were also unsuccessful attempts to sign Swansea midfielder Ferrie Bodde and Wigan's Marlon King on a season-long loan. Trials were also given to former Reading winger John Oster (who rejected the offer of a contract), Nigerian midfielder Richard Eromoigbe (whom the club decided not to sign), Australian defender Daniel Piorkowski (who eventually joined Walsall) and French midfielder Julien Sablé. (who, as with Eromoigbe, the club declined to sign)

Four players were initially allowed to leave the club, with the contracts of Michael Johnson, Lee Holmes and Marc Edworthy not being renewed following their completion, and Ben Hinchcliffe's contract being terminated. Andy Todd was told he could leave on a free transfer but is still currently with the club. Players moving out for fees were Kenny Miller, who rejoined Rangers for £2m; club record signing Rob Earnshaw for £2.65m to rivals Nottingham Forest less than a year after joining the club; David Jones, who joined Wolves for £1.2m; Craig Fagan, who returned to Hull City for £750k and Darren Moore, who signed for Barnsley on a free. Stephen Pearson was expected to move to Birmingham but the move fell through due to Birmingham's unwillingness to sign the player while injured and Pearson rejecting a loan move. Stephen Bywater was the subject of an accepted £200k bid from Tottenham. However, despite taking a medical, Tottenham decided not to sign Bywater. Shortly after the start of the season, these players were joined by Eddie Lewis, whose contract was terminated by mutual consent and Benny Feilhaber who joined Danish side AGF Aarhus on a free. Another, unwanted, departure came with the news of club captain Alan Stubbs' retirement through injury on 20 August.

=== August ===
The first game of the new Championship season saw nine of Jewell's summer signings make their debuts (seven starting and two as substitutes), but lost 1–0 to Doncaster. This stretched the club's winless run to 33 matches and saw Jewell express disappointment with his players failing to cope with the pressure. Jewell finally got his first win as Derby manager (not counting an FA Cup third round penalties victory against Sheff Wednesday in January 2008) three days later as Derby beat Lincoln 3–1 in the League Cup first round, with Nathan Ellington getting his first goals for the club with a hattrick. A 1–1 draw with Bristol City four days later saw the club break the league record for longest winless streak, stretching it to 34 matches.

On 14 August 2008 the club finally announced the extent of the club's debt after several months of speculation. The club's new chairman, Andrew Appleby, announced that upon arrival at the club in January 2008, Derby were £31m in debt. This had been reduced by £6m to £25m in the first six months of the new boards tenure, with the aim to reduce it by a further £10m by August 2009, leaving Derby with only the £15m mortgage on the Pride Park Stadium to repay. It was also announced that £10.4m of the 2008–09 season's £11.5m parachute payment has already been spent on players bought the previous summer. These players (such as Kenny Miller and Claude Davis) had still not completely been paid for, with Chairman of Football Adam Pearson stating that "We’ve (Derby County) still got to find £3m this month for Claude Davis, Kenny Miller, David Jones and Benny Feilhaber – so that's another significant investment." He added that "At the minute, the wages are circa £2.5m more than where I’d like them to be on an annual basis, so that needs taking care of." This was followed by a mixed series of results, with two more league defeats (1–0 at home to Southampton and 2–0 away to Barnsley, both clubs previously without a win) leaving the club bottom of the table going into the two-week international break, sandwiching a 1–0 win away to in-form Preston North End in the League Cup second round.

On 29 August 2008 Mears caused controversy when he flew to France to go on trial with Olympique Marseille without the express permission of Derby manager Paul Jewell. Jewell responded, saying that Mears will never play for the club again whilst he is in charge. Following the trial, the clubs agreed that Mears would go on loan to Marseille for the duration of the 2008–09 season, for a loan fee of £160,000, with the French club having the option to buy him for £1.5m at the end of the loan.

=== September ===
Following the two-week break for international fixtures, Derby's next match was against Sheffield United. The game generated much media coverage as it was approaching a year since Derby's last league win, a run which saw the club break the English league record for most matches without a win. On 13 September 2008, four days short of the anniversary of the 1–0 win over Newcastle, Rob Hulse scored against his former club as Derby ran out 2–1 winners, earning Paul Jewell his first league win as Derby boss at his 27th attempt. The win sparked an upturn in the club's fortunes and Derby went the whole of September undefeated, including the club's first away win in 18 months with a 2–0 success away to Q.P.R. and a draw at home to league leaders Birmingham City. The form of defender Martin Albrechtsen saw him nominated for the Championship Player of the Month award, though he lost out to Reading's Kevin Doyle.

=== October ===
Derby's undefeated run was stretched to six games after a 2–1 win away to Norwich City, which saw Nathan Ellington get his first league goal for the club with an 85th-minute winner. The win meant that Derby had earned more points in six matches than in the whole of the previous season and put them within two points of a play-off place going into the international break. Returning from the international break, The Rams continued their run, taking it to seven games, by beating Plymouth Argyle 2–1 at home. A 3–2 defeat away to Blackpool ended the club's unbeaten streak, but the Rams recovered to earn a point at Coventry City and beat Norwich for the second time in a month, winning 3–1 at home with a performance Paul Jewell described as "Our best yet". Rob Hulse's form during October saw him awarded the Championship Player of the Month award, after he scored four goals in five games, while Paul Jewell earned his first Championship Manager of the Month nomination as Derby boss, though he eventually lost out to Cardiff City's Dave Jones.

=== November ===
November started with the return of the East Midlands derby against Nottingham Forest to the fixture list, following a three-year absence. The match ended as a 1–1 draw after referee Stuart Attwell disallowed two Derby goals in the final few minutes. Atwell also booked eight players and issued a straight red card to Forest midfielder Lewis McGugan. Jewell was especially vocal in his dismay at Attwell's performance, accusing the 25-year-old official of 'losing control' of the game and 'robbing' the Rams of a victory. The press furore around his display saw Attwell called in for a meeting with Referee's Chief Keith Hackett and was consequently axed from the following week's fixture list. Days after the game Derby manager Paul Jewell said that a member of the Football Association had contacted him and told him that the second goal should have stood. The Attwell controversy overshadowed Derby's run of only one defeat in 11 and their retention of the Brian Clough Trophy. It also stretched Derby's unbeaten streak against Forest to five, having lost just once to their rivals in the last 11 meetings. Following the Forest game however, Derby's form began to stutter – despite two wins over League One clubs Brighton & Hove Albion (4–1) and Leeds United (2–1) in the League Cup, taking Derby to their first quarter-final in the competition since 1989, Derby won just one of their next four league games, a 3–0 win over Sheffield Wednesday that gave them their biggest league win since a 5–1 win over Colchester United in May 2007. The club's dip in form saw Jewell making vocal his desire to bring fresh legs and impetus into a squad being hit by injuries and a busy fixture list, whilst assistant manager Chris Hutchings called for greater 'consistency'. Despite the club's disappointing form they remained in contention for the play-offs. The last week of November proved to be a busy one as the club signed former Southampton defender Darren Powell on a free transfer and brought in West Ham United youngster James Tomkins and Charlton Athletic's Luke Varney in on loan, with Andy Todd, Liam Dickinson, Jay McEveley and Mitchell Hanson going out on loan to Northampton, Blackpool, Charlton and Notts County respectively.

=== December ===
Despite these changes the club's poor form carried into December, where defeats by Crystal Palace and Wolves saw the club drop to 18th in the league and claims within the media that Jewell's position as manager was under threat, rumours denied by the club itself. Away from the league, a 1–0 win away to Stoke City in the League Cup saw the club reach the semi-final of a major cup competition for the first time since the 1976 FA Cup semi-final against Manchester United, who, ironically, the club drew to face this time around too. The league form continued to worsen, with defeats against Preston and Ipswich leaving the club just five points clear of relegation and, with pressure from supporters and the media increasing, Paul Jewell resigned as manager on 28 December, with assistant manager Chris Hutchings taking over as caretaker manager. His first move was to recall Liam Dickinson from his loan spell at Blackpool.

=== January ===
The resignation of Paul Jewell saw a raft of names being linked with Derby County, including former manager Billy Davies , Paul Ince, Nigel Clough, Dean Saunders, Aidy Boothroyd and Alan Curbishley.

On the pitch Hutchings first game in charge saw The Rams go 2–0 down in the first 20 minutes away to non-league Forest Green in the FA Cup Third round before eventually winning 4–3, earning the club a draw with local rivals Nottingham Forest in the 4th Round. The club made its first foray into the January transfer window on 5 January 2009 with the signing of Middlesbrough defender Seb Hines on a monthlong loan. The same day Adam Pearson announced that a shortlist of managerial candidates had been written up, with suggestions it contained caretaker manager Chris Hutchings, Burton Albion's Nigel Clough, Peterborough boss Darren Ferguson and former Derby player Dean Saunders, manager of Wrexham, with Clough as the 'top target'. The same day saw Clough officially approached about the position and he was announced as Derby's new manager on 6 January 2008, bringing his backroom staff of Gary Crosby, Andy Garner and Martin Taylor with him from Burton Albion.

Clough was introduced to the Derby support on 7 January, prior to the kick off of the League Cup Semi-final First Leg against Manchester United. The match presided over by Academy Manager David Lowe as a result of Chris Hutchings leaving the club following Clough's appointment and Kris Commons's 30th minute 25-yard strike was enough to give the Rams a 1–0 lead to take into the second leg. The win was their second against Premier League opposition in the competition and put the club in the strange position of beating more Premier League teams in the 2008/09 season than the previous campaign when they had actually been in the Premier League.

Clough's first game in charge was due to be Cardiff City away in the Championship, but it was called off due to a frozen pitch. Clough also announced his intention to cut the squad as he felt it had 'too many players', with his first move being to cancel Latvian winger Andrejs Pereplotkins' loan, release defender Darren Powell when two-month contract expired and loan out Aleksandar Prijović, Giles Barnes, Lewis Price and Claude Davis out to Yeovil Town, Fulham, Luton Town and Crystal Palace respectively. He also cancelled the contract of Guinean left back Mo Camara.

Clough's first game in charge was a home game against Q.P.R. which ended in a 2–0 defeat and saw Derby drop to 20th in the table and followed it up with a 4–2 defeat away to Manchester United in the second leg of the League Cup Semi-final which saw Derby knocked out of the competition 4–3 on aggregate. Derby's second cup match in three days saw them draw 1–1 with rivals Nottingham Forest at Pride Park in the FA Cup Fourth round. His second league match, away to Birmingham City ended in a 1–0 defeat which saw the club drop into the bottom three for the first time since August. Clough's first win came with a 2–1 victory over Coventry City, which saw the club leap to 18th in the table. The match was watched from the stands by Clough's first signing, Chris Porter, who signed for an undisclosed fee, believed to be around £400k from Motherwell.

=== February ===
Clough earned his first away win as Derby manager with a 3–2 win away at Nottingham Forest in the FA Cup 4th Round replay on 4 February 2009 to book an FA Cup 5th Round tie at home to Manchester United. The win was Derby's first win at the City Ground since October 1971, when the club was managed by Nigel's father Brian, and saw the club come from being 2–0 down after 15 minutes to get the win, earning the Rams the F&C Performance of The Week award. A 3–0 win away at Plymouth Argyle the weekend after was Derby's biggest away win for seven years and saw the club leap up to 16th in the table. The Rams three match winning streak was ended when Man Utd knocked them out of a cup competition for the second time in a month as they ran out 4–1 winners in the FA Cup Fifth round. The Rams returned to winning ways with a 4–1 victory over Blackpool and a 3–1 win away at Nottingham Forest, their second win at their rivals ground in a month, before a 2–1 defeat away to Doncaster Rovers.

=== March ===
The first game of March saw Chris Porter grab his first goals for the club since his move from Motherwell in a 2–2 draw at home to Swansea City, a match in which The Rams threw away a 2–0 lead, leaving them just 5 points clear of the relegation zone, though still with games in hand on the majority of their relegation rivals due to the club's various cup successes. Despite only drawing, Clough declared the performance "the best since we have been here. " Away from the pitch, the same week saw the club take Blackburn Rovers youngster Josh O'Keefe on trial, with a view to a permanent move in the summer when his contract expired., Jordan Stewart's 25-yard strike in the October 2008 win over Sheffield Wednesday nominated for the Football League Mitre Goal of the Year 2008 award and key players Miles Addison and Paul Green seasons ended by injury. Despite these setbacks, the Rams returned to winning ways with a 2–1 victory over play off chasing Bristol City, with Chris Porter scoring his third for the club after just 52 seconds and Rob Hulse grabbing his 15th of the campaign to seal the win just 2 minutes after Bristol City had equalised. The result meant the club had taken 16 points from the last 21 available and took the club to 15th in the table, eight points clear of the relegation places. In an attempt to soften the blow of losing Green and Addison, midfielders John Eustace and Barry Bannan were brought in on loan from Watford and Aston Villa respectively. As Clough stated he felt the club had too many strikers, strikers Liam Dickinson (Leeds United), Aleksandar Prijović (Northampton Town) and Paris Simmons (Lincoln City) and Luke Varney (Sheffield Wednesday) were sent out on loan, though Simmons returned after just 4 days due to an ankle injury. The new signings could not help the Rams record a win in the months remaining fixtures, with draws against Southampton and Barnsley sandwiching a 2–4 defeat away to playoff chasing Sheff Utd.

=== April ===
April proved to be a difficult month for the Rams, with 4 of the first six matches of the month coming against clubs in the Top 6. Three ended in defeat – 4–1 away to Cardiff City, 3–2 at home to Wolves and 2–0 at home to Reading. The club did earn a point at home to Burnley, thanks to Paul Connolly's 93rd-minute equaliser in a 1–1 draw, but a defeat away at midtable Crystal Palace meant that only a 1–0 victory at Sheffield Wednesday gave Derby three points. It meant a run of only one win in 9 games, but the victory at Hillsborough did take the club over the 50 points marker set by Clough as the target for survival.

The last home game of the season against Charlton Athletic saw Hulse presented with the Jack Stamps Trophy for Player of the Season by 1997 winner Chris Powell. He celebrated by hitting his 18th goal of the season as Derby won 1–0 to guarantee their Championship survival.

With safety assured, Clough began to restructure the squad and backroom staff ahead of the 2009–10 season. In terms of backroom staff, Clough announced his intention to restructure the academy, appointing former Derby players Darren Wassall and Michael Forsyth and Wolves Academy director John Perkins to the backroom staff, to replace the departed Phil Cannon, David Lowe and Brian Burrows. In terms of playing staff it was announced that Andy Todd and Paris Simmons would not have their contracts extended, with loanees Przemyslaw Kazmierczak, Nacer Barazite and Barry Bannan returning to their clubs.

=== May ===
The season ended with an experimental line-up, featuring Rob Hulse at centre-half and Stephen Pearson at left back, losing 3–1 away to Watford to finish 18th in the Championship, the club's lowest league finish for three years, eight points clear of the relegation zone. The day after the match, Clough announced his intention to cut the playing staff by up to 17 players.

== End of season squad ==
Player	Country	Squad number	Position	Signed from	Date	Fee paid	Total Derby appearances*	Total Derby goals*
Roy Carroll	(Northern Ireland)	1	Goalkeeper	Rangers	31 January 2008	Free	38 (0)	0
Paul Connolly	(England)	2	Defender	Plymouth Argyle	15 May 2008	Free	48 (1)	1
Jay McEveley	(Scotland) (Note: McEveley was born in Liverpool, England, and represented them at U-20 and U-21 level, but also qualified to represent Scotland internationally and represented them at B level before making his international debut for Scotland in August 2007.)	3	Defender	Blackburn Rovers	29 January 2007	£600k, rising to £1m	55 (10)	2
Paul Green	(England) (Note: Green was born in Pontefract, England, but also qualified to represent the Republic of Ireland internationally through his maternal grandmother and would make his international debut for the Republic of Ireland in May 2010.)	4	Midfielder	Doncaster Rovers	1 July 2008	Free	40 (0)	6
Jordan Stewart	(England)	5	Defender	Unattached	30 May 2008	Free	33 (0)	2
Kris Commons	(Scotland) (Note: Commons was born in Mansfield, England, but also qualifies to represent Scotland internationally through his paternal grandmother and made his international debut for Scotland in August 2008.)	7	Midfielder	Unattached	2 June 2008	Free	41 (5)	7
Robbie Savage	(Wales)	8	Midfielder	Blackburn Rovers	9 January 2008	£1.5m	41 (4)	1
Nathan Ellington	(England)	9	Striker	Watford	30 May 2008	loan	17 (15)	9
Emanuel Villa	(Argentina)	10	Striker	Tecos UAG	4 January 2008	£2m.	25 (28)	9
Rob Hulse	(England)	11	Striker	Sheffield United	21 July 2008	£1.75m	52 (3)	18
Lewis Price	(Wales) (Note: Price was born in Bournemouth, England, but also qualifies to represent Wales internationally and made his international debut for Wales in November 2005.)	12	Goalkeeper	Ipswich Town	27 July 2007	Undisclosed	9 (0)	0
Stephen Bywater	(England)	13	Goalkeeper	West Ham United	29 August 2007	£225k	95 (1)	0
Tyrone Mears	(England) (Note: Mears was born in Chadderton, England, but represented Jamaica in February 2009, apparently qualifying through his father. It was later discovered that his father was actually from Sierra Leone and Mears was ineligible to represent Jamaica.)	14	Defender	West Ham United	4 July 2007	£1m	39 (9)	2
Luke Varney	(England)	15	Striker	Charlton Athletic	27 November July 2008	£1m+	10 (2)	1
Mile Sterjovski	(Australia)	16	Midfielder	Gençlerbirliği OFTAŞ	24 January 2008	£300k	16 (14)	2
Dean Leacock	(England)	17	Defender	Fulham	11 August 2006	£375k	76 (7)	0
Giles Barnes	(England) (Note: Barnes was born in Barking and Dagenham, England, and represented them at U-19 level, but also qualifies to represent Jamaica internationally through his paternal grandparents and would make his international debut for Jamaica in May 2015.)	18	Midfielder	Trainee	1 July 2005	N/A	66 (28)	13
Lewin Nyatanga	(Wales) (Note: Nyatanga was born in Burton upon Trent, England, but also qualifies to represent Wales internationally through his mother and Zimbabwe through his father, and represented Wales at U-17 and U-21 level before making his international debut for Wales in March 2006.)	19	Defender	Trainee	24 August 2005	N/A	69 (7)	4
Steve Davies	(England)	20	Midfielder	Tranmere Rovers	12 June 2008	£275k, rising to £725k	11 (13)	4
Claude Davis	(Jamaica)	21	Defender	Sheffield United	25 July 2007	£3m	29 (2)	0
Andy Todd	(England)	22	Defender	Blackburn Rovers	7 July 2007	£700k	26 (10)	1
Gary Teale	(Scotland)	23	Midfielder	Wigan Athletic	11 January 2007	£600k	53 (20)	2
Miles Addison	(England)	24	Midfielder	Trainee	1 July 2005	N/A	39 (0)	2
Ruben Zadkovich	(Australia)	26	Midfielder	Sydney FC	17 April 2008	Free	2 (5)	0
Stephen Pearson	(Scotland)	27	Midfielder	Celtic	11 January 2007	£750k	43 (9)	2
Martin Albrechtsen	(Denmark)	28	Defender	West Bromwich Albion	30 June 2008	Free	42	3
Liam Dickinson	(England)	29	Striker	Stockport County	1 July 2008	£750k, rising to £1m	0 (0)	0
Mitchell Hanson	(England)	31	Defender	Trainee	1 July 2007	N/A	0 (1)	0
Chris Porter	(England)	32	Striker	Motherwell	1 February 2009	£400k	3 (3)	3
Aleksandar Prijović	(Serbia) (Note: Prijović was born in St. Gallen, Switzerland, but also qualifies to represent Serbia internationally through his parents, and has represented Serbia at U-17 and U-19 level and Switzerland at U-20 and U-21 level before making his international debut for Serbia in May 2017.)	34	Striker	Unattached	7 August 2008	Free	0 (0)	0
Jason Beardsley	(England)	35	Defender	Trainee	1 July 2007	N/A	2 (0)	0
Mark Dudley	(England)	37	Defender	Trainee	1 July 2008	N/A	0 (1)	0
Mark O'Brien	(Republic of Ireland)	41	Defender	Trainee	1 July 2009	N/A	0 (1)	0

- Up to and including 4 May 2009.

== Transfers ==
=== Summer (1 July 2008 – 1 September 2008) ===
==== In ====
===== Permanent =====
Player	Country	Squad number	Position	Signed From	Date	Fee Paid
Paul Connolly	(England)	2	Defender	Plymouth Argyle	15 May 2008	Free
Jordan Stewart	(England)	5	Defender	Unattached	30 May 2008	Free
Kris Commons	(England)	7	Midfielder	Unattached	2 June 2008	Free
Steve Davies	(England)	20	Midfielder	Tranmere Rovers	12 June 2008	£275k, rising to £725k
Martin Albrechtsen	(Denmark)	28	Defender	West Bromwich Albion	30 June 2008	Free
Liam Dickinson	(England)	29	Striker	Stockport County	1 July 2008	£750k
Paul Green	(England)	4	Midfielder	Doncaster Rovers	1 July 2008	Free
Rob Hulse	(England)	11	Striker	Sheffield United	21 July 2008	£1.75m
Aleksandar Prijović	(Serbia)	34	Striker	Unattached	7 August 2008	Free
Darren Powell	(England)	32	Defender	Unattached	21 November 2008	Free

- Total spending: ▼ ~ £3.25m

===== Loan =====
Player	Country	Squad number	Position	Loaned From	Date	Loan Duration
Nathan Ellington	(England)	9	Striker	Watford	30 May 2008	Season Long
Przemysław Kaźmierczak	(Poland)	6	Midfielder	Porto	21 July 2008	Season Long
Andrejs Perepļotkins	(Latvia) (Note: Perepļotkins was born in Kharkiv, Soviet Union (now Ukraine), but acquired Latvian citizenship in 2007, and made his full international debut for Latvia in 2007.)	33	Midfielder	Skonto FC Rīga	7 August 2008	5 Months (7 August – 15 January)
Nacer Barazite	(Netherlands)	25	Midfielder	Arsenal	19 August 2008	Season Long
Luke Varney	(England)	15	Striker	Charlton Athletic	27 November 2008	5 Weeks (November – January)
James Tomkins	(England)	35	Defender	West Ham United	27 November 2008

==== Out ====
===== Permanent =====
Player	Country	Squad number	Position	Signed From	Date	Fee Paid	Total Derby Appearances	Total Derby Goals	Sold To	Date	Fee Received
Marc Edworthy	(England)	2	Defender	Norwich City	6 July 2005	Free	80 (4)	0	End of Contract	13 May 2008	N/A
Michael Johnson	(Jamaica) (Note: Johnson was born in Nottingham, England, but also qualified to represent Jamaica internationally and made his international debut for Jamaica in 1999.)	6	Defender	Birmingham City	August 2003	Free	137 (13)	5	End of Contract	13 May 2008	N/A
Lee Holmes	(England)	16	Midfielder	Trainee	25 December 2002	N/A	29 (23)	2	End of Contract	13 May 2008	N/A
Ben Hinchliffe	(England)	29	Goalkeeper	Preston North End	10 July 2007	Free	0	0	Released	13 May 2008	N/A
Robert Earnshaw	(Wales) (Note: Earnshaw was born in Mufulira, Zambia, but was raised in Wales from the age of nine and made his international debut for Wales in May 2002.)	10	Striker	Norwich City	29 June 2007	£3.5m	8 (17)	2	Nottingham Forest	30 May 2008	£2.65m
Kenny Miller	(Scotland)	14	Striker	Celtic	31 August 2007	£2.25m.	33 (0)	6	Rangers	13 June 2008	£2m
David Jones	(England)	7	Midfielder	Manchester United	4 January 2007	£1m	41 (6)	7	Wolves	27 June 2008	£1.2m
Craig Fagan	(England)	11	Midfielder	Hull City	9 January 2008	£750k, rising to £1m	36 (10)	2	Hull City	2 July 2008	£750k
Darren Moore	(Jamaica) (Note: Moore was born in Birmingham, England, but also qualified to represent Jamaica internationally through his parents and made his international debut for Jamaica in 1999.)	23	Defender	West Bromwich Albion	26 January 2006	£500k	80 (10)	4	Barnsley	2 July 2008	Free
Eddie Lewis	(United States)	25	Midfielder	Leeds United	20 August 2007	Undisclosed	24 (3)	0	Released	15 August 2008	N/A
Benny Feilhaber	(United States) (Note: Feilhaber was born in Rio de Janeiro, Brazil, but was raised in the United States from the age of six, and also qualifies to represent Austria internationally through his paternal grandfather. Feilhaber made his international debut for the United States in March 2007.)	31	Midfielder	Hamburg	10 August 2007	£1m	1 (9)	0	AGF Aarhus	15 August 2008	Free
Alan Stubbs	(England)	15	Defender	Everton	31 January 2008	Free	9	0	Retired	20 August 2008	N/A

- Total income: ▲ ~ £6.6 million

===== Loan =====
Player	Country	Squad number	Position	Loaned To	Date	Loan Duration
Jason Beardsley	(England)	35	Defender	Notts County	4 July 2008	6 Months (4 July – 4 January)
Mohammed Camara	(Guinea)	30	Defender	Blackpool	4 August 2008	3 Months (10 August – 10 November)
Gary Teale	(Scotland)	23	Midfielder	Barnsley	15 August 2008	1 Month (15 August – 15 September)
Liam Dickinson	(England)	29	Striker	Huddersfield Town	19 August 2008	3 Month (19 August – 19 November)
Tyrone Mears	(England)	14	Defender	Olympic Marseille	1 September 2008	Season Long Loan
Jay McEveley	(Scotland)	3	Defender	Preston North End	29 September 2008	One Month (29 September – 29 October)
Robbie Savage	(Wales)	8	Midfielder	Brighton	1 October 2008	One Month (1 – 30 October)
Lewis Price	(Wales)	12	Goalkeeper	MK Dons	26 October 2008	3 Weeks (26 October – 18 November)
Paris Simmons	(England)	NA	Striker	Burton Albion	30 October 2008	One Month (30 October – 30 November)
Ross Atkins	(England)	NA	Goalkeeper	Southport	30 October 2008	One Month (30 October – 30 November)
Andy Todd	(England)	22	Defender	Northampton Town	25 November 2008	5 Weeks (25 November – 3 January)
Liam Dickinson	(England)	29	Striker	Blackpool	27 November 2008	5 Weeks (27 November – 30 December)
Jay McEveley	(Scotland)	3	Defender	Charlton Athletic	27 November 2008	6 Weeks (27 November – 12 January)
Mitchell Hanson	(England)	31	Defender	Notts County	27 November 2008	1 Month (Nov–Dec)

=== January (1 January – 2 February 2009) ===
==== In ====
===== Permanent =====
Player	Country	Squad number	Position	Signed from	Date	Fee paid
Luke Varney	(England)	15	Striker	Charlton Athletic	1 January 2009	£1m+
Chris Porter	(England)	32	Striker	Motherwell	1 February 2009	£400k

- Total spending: ▼ ~ £1.4m

===== Loan =====
Player	Country	Squad number	Position	Loaned From	Date	Loan Duration
Seb Hines	(England)	36	Defender	Middlesbrough	5 January 2009	One Month
John Eustace	(England)	30	Midfielder	Watford	9 March 2009	Season Long Loan
Barry Bannan	(Scotland)	33	Midfielder	Aston Villa	13 March 2009	Season Long

==== Out ====
===== Permanent =====
Player	Country	Squad number	Position	Signed From	Date	Fee Paid	Total Derby Appearances	Total Derby Goals	Sold To	Date	Fee Received
Darren Powell	(England)	32	Defender	Unattached	21 November 2008	Free	6 (2)	0	End of Contract	21 January 2009	N/A
Mohammed Camara	(Guinea)	30	Defender	Celtic	16 August 2006	Free	29 (0)	1	Released	2 February 2009	N/A

- Total income: ▲ ~ £0.0 million

===== Loan =====
Player	Country	Squad number	Position	Loaned To	Date	Loan Duration
Aleksandar Prijović	(Serbia)	34	Striker	Yeovil Town	27 January 2009	1 Month (27 January – 27 February)
Giles Barnes	(England)	18	Midfielder	Fulham	30 January 2009	4 Months (30 January – 30 May)
Lewis Price	(Wales)	13	Goalkeeper	Luton Town	2 February 2009	1 Months (2 February – 2 March)
Claude Davis	(Jamaica)	21	Defender	Crystal Palace	2 February 2009	1 Month (2 February-3 May)
Paris Simmons	(England)	NA	Striker	Lincoln City	10 March 09	3 Days (10 – 13 March)
Liam Dickinson	(England)	29	Striker	Leeds United	13 March 2009	2 Months (2 February- 3 May)
Aleksandar Prijović	(Serbia)	34	Striker	Northampton Town	16 March 2009	1 Month (16 March – 16 April)
Luke Varney	(England)	15	Striker	Sheffield Wednesday	20 March 2009	1 Month (20 March – 20 April)

== Results ==
Win	Draw	Loss

=== Preseason ===
Date	Opponent	Venue	Result	Scorers	Attendance
11 July 2008	TOP Oss	A	0–2		None given
16 July 2008	Burton Albion	A	2–0	Davies [18], Ellington [45]	3,942
19 July 2008	Rotherham United	A	0–0		None given
23 July 2008	Oldham Athletic	A	1–1	Villa [16]	None given
26 July 2008	Mansfield Town	A	3–2	Hulse [12], Villa [76], Green [79]	4,002
29 July 2008	Rushden And Diamonds	A	1–0	Ellington [50]	886
2 August 2008	FC Utrecht	H	2–2	Commons [17], Ellington (Pen) [45]	9,645.

Cancelled Fixture

A proposed friendly away to Lincoln City, due to take place on 26 July 2008, was cancelled by mutual consent when the two clubs drew each other in the first round of the League Cup.

=== Football League Championship ===
Date	Match	Opponent	Venue	Result	Scorers	Attendance	Pos.
9 August 2008	1	Doncaster Rovers	H	0–1		33,010 (3,136 away)	21
16 August 2008	2	Bristol City	A	1–1	Green [51]	16,389 (925 away)	17
23 August 2008	3	Southampton	H	0–1		27,032 (1,098 away)	20
30 August 2008	4	Barnsley	A	0–2		14,223 (2,921 away)	24
14 September 2008	5	Sheffield United	H	2–1	Kilgallon (O.G.) [24], Hulse [71]	28,473 (2,032 away)	20
17 September 2008	6	Swansea City	A	1–1	Pearson [63]	14,003 (516 away).	21
20 September 2008	7	Cardiff City	H	1–1	Albrechtsen [28]	28,007 (1,677 away)	20
27 September 2008	8	QPR	A	2–0	Albrechtsen [80], Villa [89]	14,311	17
30 September 2008	9	Birmingham	H	1–1	Davies [86]	29,743 (2,500 away)	18
4 October 2008	10	Norwich	A	2–1	Hulse [26], Ellington [85]	24,771 (1,100 away)	15
18 October 2008	11	Plymouth Argyle	H	2–1	Hulse [45+1], Duguid (O.G.) [52]	28,495 (1,243 away)	10
21 October 2008	12	Blackpool	A	2–3	Commons [59], Stejovski [71]	7,267 (1,260 away)	14
25 October 2008	13	Coventry City	A	1–1	Hulse [41]	18,430 (3,039 away)	14
28 October 2008	14	Norwich City	H	3–1	Green [14], Hulse[28], Kazmierczak [80]	26,621 (1,232 away)	10
2 November 2008	15	Nottingham Forest	H	1–1	Villa [66]	33,010 (2,766 away)	9
8 November 2008	16	Reading	A	0–3		18,724	13
15 November 2008	17	Sheffield Wednesday	H	3–0	Commons [31], Addison [53], Stewart [67]	30,111 (2,800 away)	12
22 November 2008	18	Ipswich Town	A	0–2		20,239	13
25 November 2008	19	Preston North End	H	2–2	Hulse [8], Stewart [32]	25,534 (637 away)	14
30 November 2008	20	Burnley	A	0–3		11,552	15
6 December 2008	21	Crystal Palace	H	1–2	Varney [41]	27,203 (826 away)	16
9 December 2008	22	Wolverhampton Wanderers	A	0–3		21,326 (1,298 away)	18
15 December 2008	23	Charlton Athletic	A	2–2	Ellington [62(Pen), 90 +4]	20,989	18
20 December 2008	24	Watford	H	1–0	Hulse [83]	27,833 (818 away)	15
26 December 2008	25	Preston North End	A	0–2		13,896	18
28 December 2008	26	Ipswich Town	H	0–1		28,358 (1,285 away)	18
17 January 2009	27	Q.P.R.	H	0–2		28,390 (1,368 away)	20
27 January 2009	28	Birmingham City	A	0–1		15,330	22
31 January 2009	29	Coventry City	H	2–1	Hulse [14], Commons [16]	29,710 (2,124 away)	18
7 February 2009	30	Plymouth Argyle	A	3–0	Teale [43], Hulse [46, 53]	10,893 (853 away)	16
18 February 2009	31	Blackpool	H	4–1	Commons [9, 73], Green [85], Barazite [89]	26,934	16
21 February 2009	32	Nottingham Forest	A	3–1	Nyatanga [4], Hulse [46], Davies (Pen) [67]	29,140 (4,206 away)	15
27 February 2009	33	Doncaster Rovers	A	1–2	Savage [50]	14,435 (3,310 away)	16
3 March 2009	34	Swansea City	H	2–2	Porter [14, 48]	26,691 (462 away)	16
7 March 2009	35	Bristol City	H	2–1	Porter [1], Hulse [84]	30,824 (2,430 away)	16
10 March 2009	36	Southampton	A	1–1	Davies [83]	17,567 (705 away)	16
14 March 2009	37	Sheff United	A	2–4	Hulse [52], Bannan [69]	27,565	17
21 March 2009	38	Barnsley	H	0–0		32,277 (1,429 away)	17
4 April 2009	39	Burnley	H	1–1	Connolly [90+3]	33,010 (2,100 away)	17
8 April 2009	40	Cardiff City	A	1–4	Johnson (O.G.) [90]	18, 403	17
11 April 2009	41	Sheffield Wednesday	A	1–0	Hulse [45]	24,392 (3,500 away)	17
13 April 2009	42	Wolverhampton Wanderers	H	2–3	Kazmierczak [30], Sterjovski [54]	33,079 (3,100 away)	17
18 April 2009	43	Crystal Palace	A	0–1		14,736 (999 away)	18
21 April 2009	44	Reading	H	0–2		31,345	18
25 April 2009	45	Charlton	H	1–0	Hulse [70]	31,541 (619 away)	16
3 May 2009	46	Watford	A	1–3	Eustace 81	16,131 (2,192 away)	18

=== FA Cup ===
Date	Round	Opponent	Venue	Result	Scorers	Attendance
3 January 2009	3rd Round	Forest Green Rovers	A	4–3	Hulse [39]. Albrechtsen [45+1], Green [75], Davies (Pen) [86]	4,836
23 January 2009	4th Round	Nottingham Forest	H	1–1	Hulse [36]	32,035
4 February 2009	4th Round (R)	Nottingham Forest	A	3–2	Hulse [28], Green [60], Commons [74]	29,001 (4,362 away)
15 February 2009	5th Round	Manchester United	H	1–4	Addison [56]	32,103

=== League Cup ===
Date	Round	Opponent	Venue	Result	Scorers	Attendance
11 August 2008	Round 1	Lincoln City	H	3–1 (A.E.T.)	Ellington [83,100,105]	10,091 (1,207 away).
26 August 2008	Round 2	Preston North End	A	1–0	Green [40]	8,037
4 November 2008	Round 3	Brighton	A	4–1	Villa [28, 73, 87], Ellington [34]	6,625 (300 away)
11 November 2008	Round 4	Leeds United	H	2–1	Villa [6], Ellington [18]	18,540 (3, 416 away)
2 December 2008	Q/F	Stoke City	A	1–0	Ellington [90+4] (Pen)	22,034 (5,000 away)
7 January 2009	S/F 1	Manchester United	H	1–0	Commons [30]	30,194
20 January 2009	S/F 2	Manchester United	A	2–4; 3–4 Agg.	Barnes [80] (Pen), [90+2]	73,374

== Squad statistics ==
=== Appearances, goals and cards ===
Last Updated – 3 May 2009

No.	Pos.	Name	League		FA Cup		League Cup		Total	
No.	Pos.	Name	Apps	Goals	Apps	Goals	Apps	Goals	Apps	Goals
1	GK	(Northern Ireland) Roy Carroll	16	0	1	0	7	0	24	0
2	DF	(England) Paul Connolly	39 (1)	1	3	0	6	0	48 (1)	1
3	DF	(Scotland) Jay McEveley	13 (2)	0	1	0	1	0	15 (2)	0
4	MF	(England) Paul Green	29	3	4	2	7	1	40	6
5	DF	(England) Jordan Stewart	26	2	2	0	5	0	33	2
6	MF	(Poland) Przemysław Kaźmierczak	12 (10)	2	0	0	4 (1)	0	16 (11)	2
7	MF	(Scotland) Kris Commons	30 (4)	5	3 (1)	1	7	1	40 (5)	7
8	MF	(Wales) Robbie Savage	20 (2)	1	3	0	1 (2)	0	24 (4)	1
9	FW	(England) Nathan Ellington	13 (14)	3	0 (1)	0	4	6	17 (15)	9
10	FW	(Argentina) Emanuel Villa	12 (18)	2	0 (1)	0	3 (2)	4	15 (21)	6
11	FW	(England) Rob Hulse	43 (2)	15	4	3	5 (1)	0	52 (3)	18
12	GK	(Wales) Lewis Price	0	0	0	0	0	0	0	0
13	GK	(England) Stephen Bywater	30 (1)	0	3	0	0	0	33 (1)	0
14	DF	(England) Tyrone Mears	3	0	0	0	1 (1)	0	4 (1)	0
15	DF	(England) Alan Stubbs	1	0	0	0	0	0	1	0
15	FW	(England) Luke Varney	9 (1)	1	1 (1)	0	0	0	10 (2)	1
16	DF	(Australia) Mile Sterjovski	6 (9)	2	0 (1)	0	1 (1)	0	7 (9)	2
17	DF	(England) Dean Leacock	10 (1)	0	0	0	1	0	11 (1)	0
18	MF	(England) Giles Barnes	0 (2)	0	1	0	0 (1)	2	1 (3)	2
19	DF	(Wales) Lewin Nyatanga	27 (3)	1	2	0	3	0	32 (3)	1
20	MF	(England) Steve Davies	8 (11)	3	0 (1)	1	3 (1)	0	11 (13)	4
21	DF	(Jamaica) Claude Davis	6 (2)	0	0	0	2	0	8 (2)	0
22	DF	(England) Andy Todd	7 (3)	0	0	0	2	0	9 (3)	0
23	MF	(Scotland) Gary Teale	24 (1)	1	4	0	2 (3)	0	30 (4)	1
24	DF	(England) Miles Addison	28	1	3	1	5	0	36	2
25	MF	(Netherlands) Nacer Barazite	22 (8)	1	3 (1)	0	0 (2)	0	25 (11)	1
26	MF	(Australia) Ruben Zadkovich	2 (3)	0	0	0	0 (2)	0	2 (5)	0
27	MF	(Scotland) Stephen Pearson	8 (4)	1	0 (1)	0	0	0	8 (5)	1
28	DF	(Denmark) Martin Albrechtsen	35	2	4	1	3	0	42	3
29	FW	(England) Liam Dickinson	0	0	0	0	0	0	0	0
30	DF	(Guinea) Mohammed Camara	1	0	1	0	1	0	3	0
30	MF	(England) John Eustace	5 (4)	1	0	0	0	0	5 (4)	1
31	DF	(England) Mitchell Hanson	0	0	0	0	0 (1)	0	0 (1)	0
32	DF	(England) Darren Powell	5 (1)	0	0 (1)	0	1	0	6 (2)	0
32	FW	(England) Chris Porter	3 (2)	3	0 (1)	0	0	0	3 (3)	3
33	MF	(Latvia) Andrejs Perepļotkins	2	0	0	0	0 (1)	0	2 (1)	0
33	MF	(Scotland) Barry Bannan	5 (5)	1	0	0	0	0	5 (5)	1
34	FW	(Serbia) Aleksandar Prijović	0	0	0	0	0	0	0	0
35	DF	(England) Jason Beardsley	0	0	1	0	0	0	1	0
35	DF	(England) James Tomkins	5 (2)	0	0	0	1	0	6 (2)	0
36	DF	(England) Seb Hines	0	0	0	0	0	0	0	0
37	DF	(Republic of Ireland) Mark O'Brien	0 (1)	0	0	0	0	0	0 (1)	0
41	DF	(England) Mark Dudley	0 (1)	0	0	0	0	0	0 (1)	0

== 2008/09 Records ==
=== Club ===
- Biggest Win – 4–1 v Blackpool (18 February 2009)
- Biggest Defeat – 1–4 v Cardiff City (8 April 2009)
- Consecutive Victories – 4 (31 January 2009 – 21 February 2009)
- Longest Unbeaten Run – 7 (14 September 2008 – 18 October 2008)
- Consecutive Defeats – 4 (26 December 2008 – 27 January 2009)
- Longest Winless Run – 6 (22 November 2008 – 15 December 2009)

=== Individuals ===
==== End of Season Awards ====
Award	Player	Country	Chosen By
Jack Stamps Player of the Year	Rob Hulse	(England)	Derby County Fans
Sammy Crooks Young Player of the Year	Miles Addison	(England)	Nigel Clough
Academy Player of the Year	Mark O'Brien	(Republic of Ireland)	Nigel Clough

==== League ====
Most league appearances:

Pos	Player	Country	Apps (Subs)
1	Rob Hulse	(England)	43 (2)
2	Paul Connolly	(England)	39 (1)
3	Martin Albrechtsen	(Denmark)	35
4	Kris Commons	(Scotland)	30 (4)
5	Stephen Bywater	(England)	30 (1)

Most league Goals:

Pos	Player	Country	Goals
1	Rob Hulse	(England)	15
2	Kris Commons	(Scotland)	5
3	Steve Davies	(England)	3
=	Nathan Ellington	(England)	3
=	Paul Green	(England)	3
=	O.G.	(England)	3
=	Chris Porter	(England)	3

==== All Competitions ====
Most appearances:

Pos	Player	Country	Apps (Subs)
1	Rob Hulse	(England)	52 (3)
2	Paul Connolly	(England)	48 (1)
3	Kris Commons	(Scotland)	40 (5)
4	Martin Albrechtsen	(Denmark)	42
5	Paul Green	(England)	40

Most Goals:

Pos	Player	Country	Goals
1	Rob Hulse	(England)	18
2	Nathan Ellington	(England)	9
3	Kris Commons	(Scotland)	7
4	Paul Green	(England)	6
=	Emanuel Villa	(Argentina)	6
