= 2007–08 Derby County F.C. season =

Derby County F.C.
2007–08 season
- Chairman: Peter Gadsby (until October); Adam Pearson (until January); Andrew Appleby
- Manager: Billy Davies (until 26 November); Paul Jewell
- Premier League: 20th (relegated)
- FA Cup: Fourth round
- League Cup: Second round
- Top goalscorer: League: Kenny Miller (4); All: Kenny Miller (6)
- Highest home attendance: 33,087 (vs. Reading, 11 May 2008)
- Lowest home attendance: 30,048 (vs. Blackburn Rovers, 30 December 2007)
- Average home league attendance: 32,432
Home colours	Away colours

The 2007–08 season was Derby County's 7th season in the Premier League, their 65th season in the top division of English football and their first season in the top flight since the 2001–02 season. They were promoted after beating West Bromwich Albion 1–0 in the 2007 Championship play-off final.

After winning only one game in the first four months of the season, manager Billy Davies was replaced by former Wigan Athletic manager Paul Jewell on 26 November 2007. Jewell failed to secure another win for the club, which spent most of the season at the foot of the table throughout a club and top-flight record run of 32 winless league games.

Derby were officially relegated on 29 March 2008 after their 2–2 home draw with fellow strugglers Fulham and Birmingham City's 3–1 victory over Manchester City left them 19 points away from safety with only 6 games left. This made Derby the first club in Premier League history to be relegated in March, the earliest team to be relegated in terms of date, and the first since Sheffield United in 1975–76 to go down from the top flight from that month, at the time only the second time it had ever happened in post-war English Football league history, before Huddersfield Town were relegated in March 2019; this record was subsequently broken by Southampton in 2025. They also accumulated the league's lowest points total since the introduction of 3 points for a win with just 11 points, as well as the record for the fewest wins in a Premier League season with just one victory in 38 games; also most defeats (29 - a record subsequently broken by Southampton F.C.), fewest goals scored (20 - a record subsequently equalled by Sheffield United), most goals conceded in a 38-game season (89 - subsequently broken by Sheffield United)

== Review ==
Derby's season began with a 2–2 draw against Portsmouth on the opening day of the season, followed by a narrow 1–0 defeat away to Sven-Göran Eriksson's Manchester City (the only two games which Derby spent outside the bottom three), but then conceded a total of 12 goals in three successive defeats. Following their 6–0 defeat to Liverpool on 1 September 2007, Irish bookmakers Paddy Power decided to pay out on the club to be relegated after just five games of the new season. The poor start saw fans accuse Gadsby and the board of failing to invest properly in players for the club. The repercussions of this saw Trevor Birch leave his position as Chief Executive on 19 October 2007 and, on 29 October 2007, Gadsby stepped down as chairman to be replaced by former Hull City owner Adam Pearson.

Meanwhile, results on the pitch were not improving, with another poor performance away to Aston Villa followed up by a 5–0 home defeat against a West Ham United side ravaged by injuries. After taking just 6 points from 14 matches, including their only win of the season with a 1–0 victory against Newcastle United, Davies left by mutual consent after a meeting with Adam Pearson, taking nearly all of his newly assembled backroom staff with him. The club had just been beaten 2–0 at home to Chelsea and were rooted to the bottom of the table. After the game, Davies had publicly criticised Derby's board for a lack of investment. Some critics believed that Davies was a victim of his own success after overachieving in his first season at Pride Park, while others cited his apparent tactical inefficiencies at top flight level, poor big money signings (including £3m Claude Davis) and suggested Davies had engineered his own departure, in the form of an outspoken rant against the board so as to avoid having a relegation on his CV.

Within two days of Davies's dismissal, on 26 November 2007, Derby appointed highly rated former Wigan Athletic manager Paul Jewell. He initially appointed Stan Ternent as his assistant but, when Ternent left to become Huddersfield Town manager in April, Jewell moved to appoint Chris Hutchings who had been his assistant at both Bradford City and Wigan. Jewell's first match in charge was a 1–0 defeat away at Sunderland on 1 December 2007, the winning goal coming in stoppage time. Although performances improved under Jewell, results didn't. The team developed a habit of conceding late goals and following the defeat to Sunderland, Derby conceded late winners or equalisers in seven games between late December 2007 and late January 2008, dropping seven points from games they had been winning or drawing. Many at the club had in fact already accepted relegation by the end of December 2007.

Jewell was busy in the January 2008 transfer window, selling several players and bringing eight new players in, namely Everton defender Alan Stubbs, Argentine striker Emanuel Villa, ex-England international defender Danny Mills on loan from Manchester City, Blackburn midfielder Robbie Savage, French winger Laurent Robert, Tottenham's Egyptian midfielder Hossam Ghaly on loan, Gençlerbirliği's Mile Sterjovski and Rangers goalkeeper Roy Carroll.

On 28 January 2008, it was announced that Derby had been purchased by American group General Sports and Entertainment, with Tom Glick taking the role of new President and Chief Executive. Derby's relegation was confirmed on 29 March, the first time a club had been relegated from the division before April and sealing the club's first immediate relegation following promotion in its history. Poor results continued: a 6–0 home defeat at the hands of Aston Villa on 12 April 2008 is the biggest defeat at Pride Park and, by the season's end, Derby had recorded the Premier League's lowest points total and equalled Loughborough's 108-year Football League record of going through an entire season with only one win. Their final game of the season was a 4–0 home defeat to Reading, who were also relegated.

== League table ==
Pos	Team	Pld	W	D	L	GF	GA	GD	Pts	Qualification or relegation
16	Bolton Wanderers	38	9	10	19	36	54	−18	37	
17	Fulham	38	8	12	18	38	60	−22	36	
18	Reading (R)	38	10	6	22	41	66	−25	36	Relegation to Football League Championship
19	Birmingham City (R)	38	8	11	19	46	62	−16	35	Relegation to Football League Championship
20	Derby County (R)	38	1	8	29	20	89	−69	11	Relegation to Football League Championship

Source: Barclays Premier League
Rules for classification: 1) points; 2) goal difference; 3) number of goals scored.
For further information on European qualification see Premier League – Competition
(R) Relegated

== Playing squad ==
Squad at end of season

Note: Flags indicate national team as defined under FIFA eligibility rules; some limited exceptions apply. Players may hold more than one non-FIFA nationality.

No.	Pos.	Nation	Player
1	GK	WAL	Lewis Price
2	DF	ENG	Marc Edworthy
4	DF	SCO	Jay McEveley
5	DF	ENG	Dean Leacock
6	DF	JAM	Michael Johnson
7	MF	ENG	David Jones
8	DF	ENG	Alan Stubbs
9	FW	ARG	Emanuel Villa
10	FW	WAL	Robert Earnshaw
14	FW	SCO	Kenny Miller
15	MF	USA	Eddie Lewis
16	MF	SCO	Gary Teale
17	DF	ENG	Andy Todd
19	DF	JAM	Claude Davis
20	MF	ENG	Lee Holmes
21	MF	AUS	Mile Sterjovski

No.	Pos.	Nation	Player
22	MF	USA	Benny Feilhaber
23	DF	JAM	Darren Moore
24	DF	JAM	Tyrone Mears
25	MF	SCO	Stephen Pearson
28	MF	JAM	Giles Barnes
29	GK	ENG	Ben Hinchliffe
30	DF	WAL	Lewin Nyatanga
31	GK	NIR	Roy Carroll
32	DF	ENG	Miles Addison
33	DF	ENG	Mitchell Hanson
34	MF	ENG	Matthew Richards
35	DF	ENG	Jason Beardsley
40	MF	EGY	Hossam Ghaly (on loan from Tottenham)
41	FW	ENG	Paris Simmons
44	MF	WAL	Robbie Savage (captain)
—	MF	AUS	Ruben Zadkovich

=== Left club during season ===
Note: Flags indicate national team as defined under FIFA eligibility rules; some limited exceptions apply. Players may hold more than one non-FIFA nationality.

No.	Pos.	Nation	Player
3	DF	GUI	Mo Camara (on loan to Norwich City)
8	MF	ENG	Matt Oakley (to Leicester City)
9	FW	SCO	Steve Howard (Note: Howard was born in Durham, England, but also qualified to represent Scotland internationally and represented them at B level.) (to Leicester City)
11	MF	ENG	Craig Fagan (on loan to Hull City)
12	FW	IRL	Jon Macken (Note: Macken was born in Blackley, England, and represented them at U-20 level, but also qualifies to represent the Republic of Ireland internationally and made his international debut for the Republic of Ireland in August 2004.) (to Barnsley)

No.	Pos.	Nation	Player
18	DF	ENG	Andy Griffin (to Stoke City)
21	DF	SCO	Bob Malcolm (to Motherwell)
26	MF	FRA	Laurent Robert (to Toronto FC)
27	DF	ENG	Danny Mills (on loan from Manchester City)
43	GK	ENG	Stephen Bywater (on loan to Ipswich Town)

== Transfers ==
=== Summer 2007 transfer window ===
==== In ====
- 29 June 2007 – Robert Earnshaw – £3.5m, from Norwich City
- 4 July 2007 – Tyrone Mears – £1m, from West Ham United
- 7 July 2007 – Andy Todd – £750k, from Blackburn Rovers
- 10 July 2007 – Ben Hinchliffe – free transfer
- 25 July 2007 – Claude Davis – £3m, from Sheffield United
- 26 July 2007 – Lewis Price – undisclosed, from Ipswich Town
- 1 August 2007 – Andy Griffin – free transfer from Portsmouth
- 10 August 2007 – Benny Feilhaber – undisclosed, from Hamburg
- 20 August 2007 – Eddie Lewis – undisclosed, from Leeds United
- 31 August 2007 – Kenny Miller – £2.25m, from Celtic

==== Out ====
- 31 May 2007 – Seth Johnson – retirement
- 31 May 2007 – Lionel Ainsworth – released
- 31 May 2007 – Morten Bisgaard – released
- 31 May 2007 – Paul Boertien – released
- 31 May 2007 – Steven Cann – released
- 31 May 2007 – Tom Cumberworth – released
- 31 May 2007 – Lee Grant – released
- 5 July 2007 – Ryan Smith – £150k, to Millwall
- 27 July 2007 – Lee Camp – £200k, to Queens Park Rangers
- 31 July 2007 – James Meredith – free transfer to Sligo Rovers
- 8 August 2007 – Richard Jackson – free transfer to Luton Town

=== January 2008 transfer window ===
==== In ====
- 4 January 2008 – Danny Mills – on loan from Manchester City
- 4 January 2008 – Emanuel Villa – £2m, from Estudiantes Tecos
- 9 January 2008 – Laurent Robert – free transfer
- 9 January 2008 – Robbie Savage – £1.5m, from Blackburn Rovers
- 11 January 2008 – Hossam Ghaly – on loan from Tottenham Hotspur
- 31 January 2008 – Roy Carroll – free transfer from Rangers
- 31 January 2008 – Mile Sterjovski – undisclosed, from Gençlerbirliği
- 31 January 2008 – Alan Stubbs – free transfer from Everton
- 11 April 2008 – Ruben Zadkovich – free transfer from Sydney FC

==== Out ====
- 3 January 2008 – Steve Howard – £1.25m, to Leicester City
- 11 January 2008 – Andy Griffin – £300k, to Stoke City
- 11 January 2008 – Matt Oakley – £500k, to Leicester City
- 28 January 2008 – Jon Macken – £200k, to Barnsley
- 31 January 2008 – Bob Malcolm – contract terminated
- 31 January 2008 – Lewin Nyatanga – loan to Barnsley
- 29 February 2008 – Michael Johnson – loan to Notts County
- 2 April 2008 – Laurent Robert – free transfer to Toronto FC

== Results ==
=== Premier League ===
Win	Draw	Loss

Date	Opponents	Venue	Result (Note: Derby County's score shown first)	Scorers	Attendance	Position
11 August 2007	Portsmouth	H	2–2	Oakley 5' Todd 84'	32,176	7th
15 August 2007	Manchester City	A	0–1		43,620	14th
18 August 2007	Tottenham Hotspur	A	0–4		35,600	19th
25 August 2007	Birmingham City	H	1–2	Oakley 51'	31,117	20th
1 September 2007	Liverpool	A	0–6		44,076	20th
17 September 2007	Newcastle United	H	1–0	Miller 39'	33,016	19th
22 September 2007	Arsenal	A	0–5		60,122	19th
29 September 2007	Bolton Wanderers	H	1–1	Miller 19'	31,503	20th
7 October 2007	Reading	A	0–1		23,091	20th
20 October 2007	Fulham	A	0–0		22,576	19th
28 October 2007	Everton	H	0–2		33,048	20th
3 November 2007	Aston Villa	A	0–2		40,938	20th
10 November 2007	West Ham United	H	0–5		32,440	20th
24 November 2007	Chelsea	H	0–2		32,789	20th
1 December 2007	Sunderland	A	0–1		42,380	20th
8 December 2007	Manchester United	A	1–4	Howard 76'	75,725	20th
15 December 2007	Middlesbrough	H	0–1		32,676	20th
23 December 2007	Newcastle United	A	2–2	Barnes 6' Miller 52'	51,386	20th
26 December 2007	Liverpool	H	1–2	McEveley 67'	33,029	20th
30 December 2007	Blackburn Rovers	H	1–2	Oakley 27'	30,048	20th
2 January 2008	Bolton Wanderers	A	0–1		17,014	20th
12 January 2008	Wigan Athletic	H	0–1		31,658	20th
19 January 2008	Portsmouth	A	1–3	Nyatanga 4'	19,401	20th
30 January 2008	Manchester City	H	1–1	Sun Jihai 46' (o.g.)	31,368	20th
2 February 2008	Birmingham City	A	1–1	Villa 89'	25,924	20th
9 February 2008	Tottenham Hotspur	H	0–3		33,058	20th
23 February 2008	Wigan Athletic	A	0–2		20,176	20th
1 March 2008	Sunderland	H	0–0		33,058	20th
12 March 2008	Chelsea	A	1–6	Jones 72'	39,447	20th
15 March 2008	Manchester United	H	0–1		33,072	20th
22 March 2008	Middlesbrough	A	0–1		25,649	20th
29 March 2008	Fulham	H	2–2	Villa 10', 80'	33,034	20th [R]
6 April 2008	Everton	A	0–1		36,017	20th
12 April 2008	Aston Villa	H	0–6		33,036	20th
19 April 2008	West Ham United	A	1–2	Mears 65'	34,612	20th
28 April 2008	Arsenal	H	2–6	McEveley 31' Earnshaw 77'	33,003	20th
3 May 2008	Blackburn Rovers	A	1–3	Miller 18'	26,110	20th
11 May 2008	Reading	H	0–4		33,087	20th

=== FA Cup ===
Win	Draw	Loss

Date	Round	Opponents	Venue	Result	Scorers	Attendance
6 January 2008	Round 3	Sheffield Wednesday	H	2–2	Miller 38' Barnes 45'	20,612
22 January 2008	Round 3 replay	Sheffield Wednesday	A	1–1 (a.e.t.) (4–2p)	Miller 47'	18,020
26 January 2008	Round 4	Preston North End	H	1–4	Earnshaw 55'	17,344

=== Football League Cup ===
Win	Draw	Loss

Date	Round	Opponents	Venue	Result	Scorers	Attendance
28 August 2007	Round 2	Blackpool	H	2–2 (a.e.t.) (6–7p)	Camara 63', Fagan 101'	8,658

== Squad statistics ==
=== Appearances, goals and cards ===
No.	Pos.	Name	League		FA Cup		League Cup		Total		Discipline	
No.	Pos.	Name	Apps	Goals	Apps	Goals	Apps	Goals	Apps	Goals	Yellow card	Red card
1	GK	(Wales) Lewis Price	6	0	3	0	0	0	9	0	0	0
2	DF	(England) Marc Edworthy	7/2	0	2	0	0	0	9/2	0	0	0
3	DF	(Guinea) Mohammed Camara	1	0	0	0	1	1	2	1	0	0
4	DF	(Scotland) Jay McEveley	21/8	2	0	0	1	0	22/8	2	6	0
5	DF	(England) Dean Leacock	22/4	0	1	0	1	0	24/4	0	4	0
6	DF	(Jamaica) Michael Johnson	1/2	0	0/1	0	0	0	1/3	0	0	0
7	MF	(England) David Jones	11/3	1	0	0	1	0	12/3	1	4	0
8	MF	(England) Matt Oakley	19	3	1	0	0	0	20	3	3	0
8	DF	(England) Alan Stubbs	8	0	0	0	0	0	8	0	3	0
9	FW	(Scotland) Steve Howard	14/6	1	0	0	0/1	0	14/7	1	3	0
9	FW	(Argentina) Emanuel Villa	9/7	3	1	0	0	0	10/7	3	2	0
10	FW	(Wales) Robert Earnshaw	7/15	1	0/2	1	1	0	8/17	2	0	0
11	MF	(England) Craig Fagan	17/5	0	2	0	1	1	20/5	1	6	0
12	FW	(Republic of Ireland) Jon Macken	0/3	0	0/1	0	0	0	0/4	0	0	0
14	FW	(Scotland) Kenny Miller	30	4	3	2	0	0	33	6	4	0
15	MF	(United States) Eddie Lewis	22/2	0	2/1	0	0	0	24/3	0	3	0
16	MF	(Scotland) Gary Teale	9/9	0	2/1	0	1	0	12/10	0	1	0
17	DF	(England) Andy Todd	14/5	1	3	0	0/1	0	17/6	1	3	0
18	DF	(England) Andy Griffin	13/2	0	0	0	0	0	13/2	0	4	0
19	DF	(Jamaica) Claude Davis	19	0	2	0	0	0	21	0	3	1
20	MF	(England) Lee Holmes	0	0	0	0	0	0	0	0	0	0
21	DF	(Scotland) Bob Malcolm	1	0	0	0	1	0	2	0	0	0
21	MF	(Australia) Mile Sterjovski	9/3	0	0	0	0	0	9/3	0	0	0
22	MF	(United States) Benny Feilhaber	1/9	0	0	0	0	0	1/9	0	1	0
23	DF	(Jamaica) Darren Moore	29/2	0	1/1	0	1	0	31/3	0	5	0
24	DF	(England) Tyrone Mears	22/3	1	1	0	0	0	23/3	1	2	0
25	MF	(Scotland) Stephen Pearson	23/1	0	2	0	0/1	0	25/2	0	1	0
26	MF	(France) Laurent Robert	0	0	3	0	1	0	3/1	0	1	0
27	DF	(England) Danny Mills	2	0	1	0	0	0	3	0	1	0
28	MF	(England) Giles Barnes	14/7	2	2/1	1	0	0	16/8	3	0	0
29	GK	(England) Ben Hinchliffe	0	0	0	0	0	0	0	0	0	0
30	DF	(Wales) Lewin Nyatanga	2	1	2	0	0	0	4	1	1	0
31	GK	(Northern Ireland) Roy Carroll	14	0	0	0	0	0	14	0	0	0
32	DF	(England) Miles Addison	1	0	0	0	0	0	1	0	0	0
33	DF	(England) Mitchell Hanson	0	0	0	0	0	0	0	0	0	0
34	MF	(England) Matthew Richards	0	0	0	0	0	0	0	0	0	0
35	DF	(England) Jason Beardsley	0	0	0	0	1	0	1	0	1	0
40	MF	(Egypt) Hossam Ghaly	13/2	0	1	0	0	0	14/2	0	2	0
41	FW	(England) Paris Simmons	0/1	0	0	0	0	0	0/1	0	0	0
43	GK	(England) Stephen Bywater	18	0	0	0	1	0	19	0	1	0
44	MF	(Wales) Robbie Savage	16	0	1	0	0	0	17	0	4	0
