= Jay McEveley =

Footballer (born 1985)

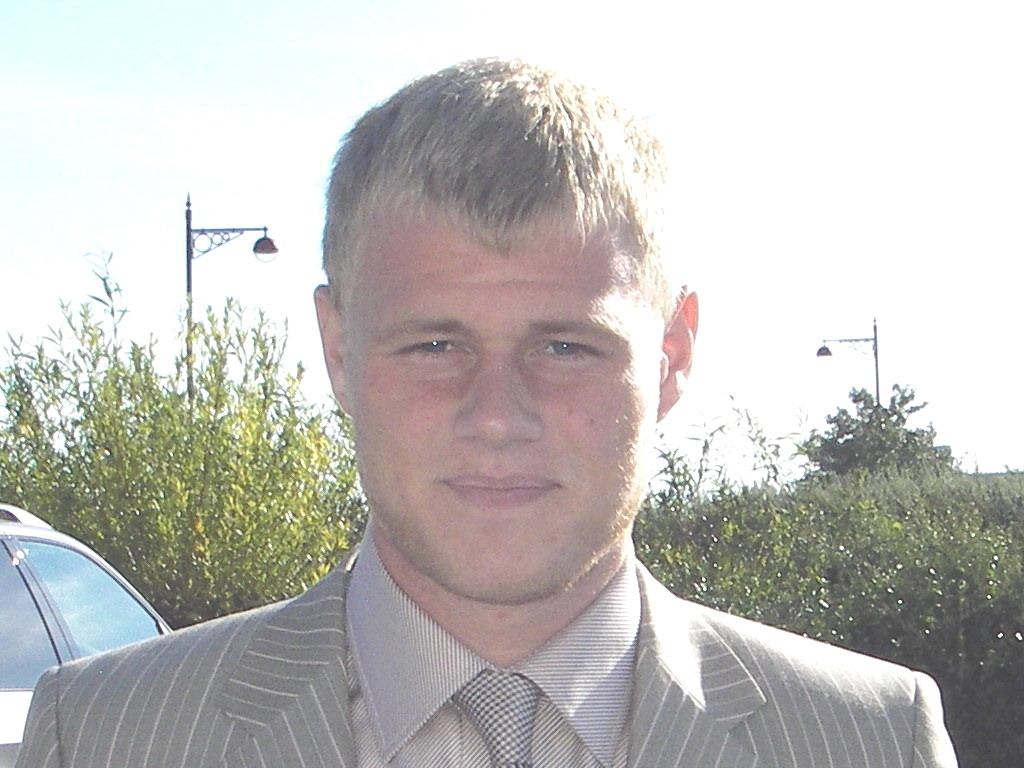
- McEveley in 2007

Personal information
- Full name: James Michael McEveley
- Date of birth: 11 February 1985 (age 41)
- Place of birth: Liverpool, Merseyside, England
- Height: 6 ft 0 in (1.84 m)
- Positions: Left-back; centre-back

Youth career
- Everton
- Blackburn Rovers

Senior career*
| Years | Team | Apps | (Gls) |
| 2002–2007 | Blackburn Rovers | 18 | (0) |
| 2003–2004 | → Burnley (loan) | 4 | (0) |
| 2005 | → Gillingham (loan) | 10 | (1) |
| 2005–2006 | → Ipswich Town (loan) | 19 | (1) |
| 2007–2010 | Derby County | 92 | (4) |
| 2008 | → Preston North End (loan) | 7 | (0) |
| 2008–2009 | → Charlton Athletic (loan) | 6 | (0) |
| 2010–2012 | Barnsley | 46 | (1) |
| 2012 | → Swindon Town (loan) | 8 | (0) |
| 2012–2014 | Swindon Town | 60 | (0) |
| 2014–2016 | Sheffield United | 70 | (1) |
| 2016–2017 | Ross County | 22 | (3) |
| 2017–2018 | Tranmere Rovers | 11 | (2) |
| 2018 | → Warrington Town (loan) | ? | (?) |
| 2018–? | Warrington Town | ? | (?) |

International career
| 2003 | England U20 | 3 | (0) |
| 2003 | England U21 | 1 | (0) |
| 2006 | Scotland B | 2 | (0) |
| 2007–2008 | Scotland | 3 | (0) |
- * Club domestic league appearances and goals as of 22:35, 24 October 2017 (UTC)

James Michael "Jay" McEveley (born 11 February 1985) is a footballer who plays as a defender for Warrington Town.

Born in Liverpool, he represented Everton at junior level before signing for Blackburn Rovers where he made his professional debut. He spent five seasons with the Lancashire club, playing for them in the Premier League, but was unable to hold a regular first team place. He was sold to Derby County in January 2007, became a regular starter for the team, but he struggled through injuries; In summer 2010 he was released. He subsequently spent two seasons each with Barnsley and Swindon Town before joining Sheffield United in 2014. During his career, McEveley also spent short spells on loan with a number of clubs; Burnley, Gillingham, Ipswich Town, Preston North End, Charlton Athletic and a brief spell at Swindon Town before his permanent switch.

Having initially represented England at both under-20 and under-21 level, McEveley also qualified to represent Scotland through his family and duly represented them, playing for both the Scotland B and Scotland national sides, making three appearances for the latter between 2007 and 2008.

== Early life ==
James Michael McEveley was born on 11 February 1985 in Liverpool, Merseyside.

== Club career ==
=== Blackburn Rovers ===
McEveley started his career with Everton, where he played in the same youth team as Wayne Rooney. McEveley never played for the club and moved to Blackburn Rovers, where he was seen as a development player. He made his first team Rovers debut against Walsall as part of a 2–2 draw in the League Cup.

To gain competitive match experience McEveley was sent out on loan three times whilst at Blackburn, spending time at Burnley; Gillingham, where he scored once against Stoke; and Ipswich, where he scored once against Plymouth Argyle. He intermittently featured in the Blackburn first team during this time, including in a match against Liverpool in October 2004 when his challenge resulted in a broken leg for Djibril Cissé.

McEveley developed a history of unfortunate involvement in serious injuries – to himself and others. McEveley was the other party in a training ground incident that left Hakan Şükür, trialist at Blackburn, with a broken leg, Mark Delaney also suffered a serious knee injury after a clash with McEveley. McEveley himself has also suffered a number of serious knee injuries.

=== Derby County ===
As he struggled to hold down a regular place at Blackburn, McEveley signed for promotion-chasing Championship side Derby County during the January 2007 transfer window for a fee rumoured to be in the region of £600,000. Replacing previous first choice left back Mo Camara, McEveley played regularly for the Rams as they eventually finished third and earned promotion to the Premier League following a 1–0 win over West Brom in the Championship play-off final. McEveley played regularly for Derby upon their return to the Premier League and scored his first goal for County against Liverpool, the equaliser, in a 2–1 home defeat. He sustained knee ligament damage in the 1–0 loss to Bolton on 2 January 2008 after a heavy tackle from Kevin Davies which was expected to keep him out for four months, though he returned six weeks later to play in Derby's 2–0 defeat away to Wigan Athletic at the end of February 2008.

McEveley began the 2008–09 season as first choice left back, but lost his place to new signing Jordan Stewart. He joined Preston North End on a one-month loan on 29 September 2008, and made his debut in a 2–0 defeat against Swansea, conceding a penalty that lead to the second goal. He returned to Derby at the end of October and a month later was sent out on loan again, this time for a three-month spell with Charlton Athletic. Alcock returned from his loan spell early in January 2009 due to injury, and then went on to re-establish himself as Derby's first choice left back. On 11 April 2009, in Derby's 1–0 win over Sheffield Wednesday, McEveley broke a metatarsal in his left foot, and was ruled out for the rest of the season.

McEveley started the 2009–10 season as Derby's second choice left back, behind new signing Dean Moxey. After only four appearances, McEveley fractured his cheekbone in the 20th minute of a game against Middlesbrough, which would potentially rule him out for six weeks. Shortly after his injury however, McEveley had an operation on his cheekbone, and was later revealed that during the operation, McEveley's heart had stopped beating for two minutes. McEveley was transferred to intensive care after his heart was successfully restarted and following a scan, doctors gave him the all-clear, telling him it would not affect his football. Alcock later said:

I had a routine operation on my fractured cheekbone and once I went under my heart stopped for two-and-a-half minutes and they had to resuscitate me before I woke up in intensive care. I didn't know anything about it until I came round and was plugged into machines, it was crazy, and I don't think you understand it at the time. You look back and think 'that could have been it'. They never put their finger on what it was and I've had no problems at all since. It changed the way I looked at things for a bit and you look back thinking about things. I was playing again three weeks later so it wasn't all that bad, and I think the manager called me Lazarus. A few people were surprised but I had no problems at all, although I did have a protective mask on my cheek.

Exactly one month after suffering his injury, McEveley returned to the first team on 20 November 2009. He went on to start eight successive games, playing with a mask to protect his cheekbone. McEveley then entered into negotiations to sign a new contract, as his contract was due to expire at the end of the season. He made his 100th appearance for Derby when he started in the penultimate game of the 2009–10 season against Bristol City before scoring his fourth of the campaign with the opener in a 2–0 win over Cardiff City. This proved to be McEveley's last significant appearance in a Derby County shirt as on 5 May 2010 the club stated he would not be offered a new contract. He ended with 101 appearances and six goals from his three and a half years with the club.

=== Barnsley and Swindon Town ===
McEveley joined Championship side Barnsley on 6 July 2010, signing a two-year contract. McEveley scored his first goal for Barnsley in the away game with Norwich City at Carrow Road, heading in Kieran Trippier's free-kick. In March 2012 he was loaned to League Two side Swindon Town for the remainder of the season.

In July 2012, McEveley joined Swindon Town permanently, making 71 appearances for the club before being released at the end of the 2013–14 season.

=== Sheffield United ===
On 15 August 2014, McEveley joined Sheffield United on a one-year deal with the option of a second year following his release from Swindon Town. At United, McEveley started to play as a centre-back, instead of his natural left-back position. On 10 February 2015, McEveley scored his first goal for the Blades in a 4–1 home victory over Colchester United. He was appointed the club's new captain on 6 August 2015 for the upcoming 2015–16 season. Upon the arrival of new manager Chris Wilder, McEveley was released at the end of the 2015–16 season.

=== Ross County ===
McEveley signed a two-year contract with Scottish Premiership club Ross County on 24 June 2016.

=== Tranmere Rovers ===
On 27 July 2017, McEveley joined Tranmere Rovers on a one-year deal. On 8 August, he scored his first goal for Rovers in a 3–1 win against Woking with a headed goal from a Jack Dunn corner. He was released by Tranmere at the end of the 2017–18 season.

== International career ==
McEveley represented England U-20 at the 2003 FIFA World Youth Championship, but subsequently represented Scotland at the U-21 level, and B level. He made his full international debut for Scotland in the 1–0 win over South Africa on 22 August 2007, and won his third cap during the 1–1 draw with Croatia at Hampden Park, significant as manager George Burley's first match with the side. McEveley's next appearance in a Scotland squad was not until Craig Levein's first competitive match in charge, as he was called up as a late replacement for the match against Lithuania in September 2007.

== Personal life ==
Born in Liverpool, McEveley is married to his wife, Carla, with whom he has a son and two daughters.

== Career statistics ==
As of match played 17 October 2017

Appearances and goals by club, season and competition
| Club | Season | League | | | National cup | | League cup | | Other (Note: Includes matches in the UEFA Cup, Football League play-offs and EFL Trophy) | | Total | |
| Club | Season | Division | Apps | Goals | Apps | Goals | Apps | Goals | Apps | Goals | Apps | Goals |
|---|---|---|---|---|---|---|---|---|---|---|---|---|
| Blackburn Rovers | 2002–03 | Premier League | 9 | 0 | 2 | 0 | 4 | 0 | 0 | 0 | 15 | 0 |
| Blackburn Rovers | 2003–04 | Premier League | 0 | 0 | 0 | 0 | 0 | 0 | 0 | 0 | 0 | 0 |
| Blackburn Rovers | 2004–05 | Premier League | 5 | 0 | 0 | 0 | 0 | 0 | 0 | 0 | 5 | 0 |
| Blackburn Rovers | 2005–06 | Premier League | 0 | 0 | 0 | 0 | 0 | 0 | 0 | 0 | 0 | 0 |
| Blackburn Rovers | 2006–07 | Premier League | 4 | 0 | 1 | 0 | 1 | 0 | 1 | 0 | 7 | 0 |
| Blackburn Rovers | Total | | 18 | 0 | 3 | 0 | 5 | 0 | 1 | 0 | 27 | 0 |
| Burnley (loan) | 2003–04 | First Division | 4 | 0 | 0 | 0 | 0 | 0 | 0 | 0 | 4 | 0 |
| Gillingham (loan) | 2004–05 | Championship | 10 | 1 | 0 | 0 | 0 | 0 | 0 | 0 | 10 | 1 |
| Ipswich Town (loan) | 2005–06 | Championship | 19 | 1 | 0 | 0 | 0 | 0 | 0 | 0 | 19 | 1 |
| Derby County | 2006–07 | Championship | 15 | 0 | 0 | 0 | 0 | 0 | 3 | 0 | 18 | 0 |
| Derby County | 2007–08 | Premier League | 29 | 2 | 0 | 0 | 1 | 0 | 0 | 0 | 30 | 2 |
| Derby County | 2008–09 | Championship | 15 | 0 | 1 | 0 | 1 | 0 | 0 | 0 | 17 | 0 |
| Derby County | 2009–10 | Championship | 33 | 2 | 2 | 2 | 1 | 0 | 0 | 0 | 36 | 4 |
| Derby County | Total | | 92 | 4 | 3 | 2 | 3 | 0 | 3 | 0 | 101 | 6 |
| Preston North End (loan) | 2008–09 | Championship | 7 | 0 | 0 | 0 | 0 | 0 | 0 | 0 | 7 | 0 |
| Charlton Athletic (loan) | 2008–09 | Championship | 6 | 0 | 0 | 0 | 0 | 0 | 0 | 0 | 6 | 0 |
| Barnsley | 2010–11 | Championship | 17 | 1 | 0 | 0 | 1 | 0 | 0 | 0 | 18 | 1 |
| Barnsley | 2011–12 | Championship | 29 | 0 | 1 | 0 | 1 | 0 | 0 | 0 | 31 | 0 |
| Barnsley | Total | | 46 | 1 | 1 | 0 | 2 | 0 | 0 | 0 | 49 | 1 |
| Swindon Town (loan) | 2011–12 | League Two | 8 | 0 | 0 | 0 | 0 | 0 | 1 | 0 | 9 | 0 |
| Swindon Town | 2012–13 | League One | 28 | 0 | 1 | 0 | 4 | 0 | 0 | 0 | 33 | 0 |
| Swindon Town | 2013–14 | League One | 32 | 0 | 1 | 0 | 1 | 0 | 3 | 0 | 37 | 0 |
| Swindon Town | Total | | 60 | 0 | 2 | 0 | 5 | 0 | 3 | 0 | 70 | 0 |
| Sheffield United | 2014–15 | League One | 34 | 1 | 5 | 0 | 5 | 0 | 2 | 0 | 46 | 1 |
| Sheffield United | 2015–16 | League One | 36 | 0 | 2 | 0 | 1 | 0 | 3 | 0 | 42 | 0 |
| Sheffield United | Total | | 70 | 1 | 7 | 0 | 6 | 0 | 5 | 0 | 88 | 1 |
| Ross County | 2016–17 | Scottish Premiership | 22 | 3 | 2 | 0 | 4 | 0 | 0 | 0 | 28 | 3 |
| Tranmere Rovers | 2017–18 | National League | 11 | 2 | 2 | 0 | – | | 0 | 0 | 13 | 2 |
| Career total | | | 373 | 13 | 20 | 2 | 25 | 0 | 13 | 0 | 431 | 14 |

== Honours ==
Derby County

- Football League Championship play-offs: 2007

Swindon Town

- Football League Trophy runner-up: 2011–12

== See also ==
- List of Scotland international footballers born outside Scotland
