= Gary Teale =

Scottish footballer (born 1978)

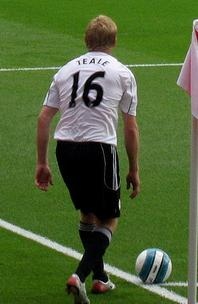
- 2007

Personal information
- Full name: Gary Stewart Teale
- Date of birth: 21 July 1978 (age 48)
- Place of birth: Glasgow, Scotland
- Height: 5 ft 9 in (1.75 m)
- Position: Winger

Youth career
- –1996: Clydebank Boys Club

Senior career*
Years	Team	Apps	(Gls)
1996–1998	Clydebank	84	(16)
1998–2001	Ayr United	104	(13)
2001–2007	Wigan Athletic	162	(8)
2007–2010	Derby County	87	(4)
2008	→ Plymouth Argyle (loan)	12	(0)
2008	→ Barnsley (loan)	3	(0)
2010–2011	Sheffield Wednesday	41	(2)
2011–2015	St Mirren	85	(0)
Total		578	(43)

International career
1996–1999	Scotland U21	6	(0)
2005	Scotland B	1	(0)
2006–2009	Scotland	13	(0)

Managerial career
- 2014–2015: St Mirren
- * Club domestic league appearances and goals

Gary Stewart Teale (born 21 July 1978) is a Scottish professional football player and coach.

Teale started his career in Scotland in 1995 with Clydebank and Ayr United. He moved to England in 2001 when he signed for Wigan Athletic and played an important part in the Wigan side that rose from the third tier (Division Two) to second (Division One) for the first time in the club's history and then went one step further to reach the top flight. Whilst at Wigan he started in the 2006 Football League Cup final. He then left for Championship side Derby County where he achieved promotion to the Premier League for the second time, although Teale was not a member of the matchday 16 for the 2007 Football League Championship play-off final. During his time at Derby, he spent time on loan with Plymouth Argyle and Barnsley.

After three years and over 100 appearances for the club, Teale left Derby in June 2010 to sign for Sheffield Wednesday. Teale then moved to St Mirren in 2011, and he helped them win the Scottish League Cup in 2013. He became St Mirren manager in 2014, but left this position after the club were relegated in May 2015. Teale represented Scotland at international level, winning 13 caps for his country between 2006 and 2009.

== Club career ==
=== Early career ===
Born in Glasgow, Scotland, Teale began his career at Clydebank. As a youth player he spent time training with Davie Cooper, who Teale felt had a major influence on his development and career. In 1995, he made his debut at the age of 16 in a Scottish League Cup match against Motherwell. During his first season at the club, he made most of his appearances as a substitute, and scored his first goal for the club towards the end of the season in a 2–1 win against St Mirren. In the summer of 1996, Clydebank were forced to take several cost-cutting measures, leaving Teale as one of only two players on full-time contracts at the club. He became a first team regular at the start of the 1996–97 season, and his impressive performances earned him a call up to the Scotland under-21s. Later in the season, he was given trials at Tottenham Hotspur and Newcastle United, but a move failed to materialise. He finished the season with six goals as the club were relegated to the Second Division. In October 1997, Teale was involved a car crash, later admitting that he was "lucky to be alive". The incident left him with a broken collarbone, and did not feature in the team until the end of the following month. He struggled to maintain his place in the first team during the 1997–98 season, starting in only 13 of 27 league appearances, and at one point was dropped from the team by manager Ian McCall "in the hope it would give him a kick up the backside." Clydebank finished the season as runners-up in the league, regaining promotion to the First Division.

In October 1998, due to Clydebank's growing financial difficulties, Teale was sold to Ayr United for a fee of £70,000, a signing described by McCall as "a Christmas bargain in October." Although there was interest from several English clubs, Teale opted to remain in Scotland as he felt he was not yet ready to leave his home country. He made his debut in a 2–0 win against St Mirren, and scored his first goal for the club on his home debut two weeks later in a 4–2 win against Falkirk. He played a pivotal role in a 3–0 Scottish Cup victory at home to local rivals Kilmarnock in 1999, winning a late penalty which was converted by Andy Walker, a goal that has gone down in history due to the humiliating manner in which Gordon Marshall the Kilmarnock goalkeeper was beaten.

=== Wigan Athletic ===
In 2001, Teale signed for Wigan Athletic for an initial fee of £275,000, which rose to £400,000 due to subsequent additional payments. He made his debut a day later against Oldham Athletic and scored his first goal for the club on 19 February 2002 in a 3–1 win against Notts County. He picked up a Second Division winners medal for the 2002–03 season.

In the 2004–05 season Wigan were promoted into the Premiership for the first time in their history, after which Teale signed a new two-year contract with the club. He also helped Wigan reach their first ever major cup final when they finished runners-up to Manchester United in 2006. Teale was the only player to feature in every match during the cup run, and played the full 90 minutes of the final itself. He eventually left Wigan after six years at the club to join Derby County for £600,000 on 11 January 2007.

=== Derby County ===
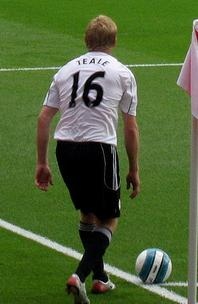
Teale taking a corner for Derby County

Teale was brought to Derby by Billy Davies to sustain Derby's push towards the Premiership and made his debut in a 1–0 win over Sheffield Wednesday on 13 January 2007, scoring his first goal with the opener in a 2–2 draw with Hull City on 10 February 2007. Despite this, he failed to hold a regular place in the Derby first team towards the end of the season and failed to make the squad for Derby's 1–0 win over W.B.A in the 2007 playoff final which earned Derby promotion.

Teale found himself in and out of the starting line up as Derby struggled to adapt to the top flight and despite playing a part in 22 games, primarily as substitute, over the 2007–08 season, he was loaned out to Championship side Plymouth Argyle by new Derby boss Paul Jewell until the end of the 2007–08 season because he needed to 'regain some confidence' Teale's loan spell at Plymouth impressed Argyle boss Paul Sturrock enough for him to want to sign the player on a permanent basis, though he was reluctant to meet Derby's £500,000 asking price. Teale was also believed to be interesting Leeds United in the 2008–09 pre-season, who would offer £400,000.

The 2008–09 season started in similar fashion as he was loaned out to Barnsley on a month's emergency loan deal, where he played three games. Upon his return to Derby Teale again sporadically appeared. However, with the resignation of Jewell and the appointment of Nigel Clough, Teale began to get a run in Derby's first eleven earning many accolades, with his form improving to the extent that it prevented a loan move to Motherwell in the January 2009. He got his second goal for the club, and his first career goal for two years on 7 February 2009 with the opener in a 3–0 victory at Plymouth Argyle. Such was the upsurgence in his form, he became something of a cult hero amongst the Derby support, earning himself the nickname Tealinho. Teale opened his goalscoring account for the 2009–10 season with an 87th-minute winner against Peterborough United and made his 100th appearance for the club as a second-half substitute in a 1–0 win over Nottingham Forest on 30 January 2010.

On 5 May 2010 it was announced that Teale would leave Pride Park after three and a half years when his contract expired. He left Derby on 30 June 2010 with 104 appearances and five goals.

=== Sheffield Wednesday ===
On 2 July 2010, Teale signed a two-year contract at Sheffield Wednesday and was given the number 21 shirt. He scored his first goal for Sheffield Wednesday against Southport in the FA Cup on 7 November 2010. Three days later he bagged his second goal as Wednesday beat Hartlepool in the Football League Trophy. Teale left Hillsborough by mutual consent on 1 July 2011, and signed a two-year deal with St Mirren.

=== St Mirren ===
After Teale left Hillsborough by mutual consent on 1 July 2011, and signed a two-year deal with St Mirren. Teale scored his first goal for Saints in a 2–0 victory in a friendly match against Dumbarton on 12 July 2011. After just 4 minutes David Barron played a ball over the Dumbarton defence, and Teale lobbed the Dumbarton goalkeeper.

Teale was part of the side that won the 2012–13 Scottish League Cup. St Mirren defeated Heart of Midlothian 3–2 in the 2013 Scottish League Cup Final at Hampden Park. Teale will be remembered for his great run down the right wing, and cross field pass that allowed Esmaël Gonçalves to score Saints equalising goal after 37 minutes. On 16 April 2013, it was announced that Teale had signed a new one-year deal with St Mirren, that will keep him at the club until the summer of 2014.

After limited appearances during season 2013–14, it was not known if Teale would be offered a new contract. On 13 May 2014 Teale signed a new two-year deal with the club, taking on a player-coach role to assist newly appointed St Mirren manager Tommy Craig. He was appointed caretaker manager after Craig was sacked in December 2014. In January 2015, Teale was appointed St Mirren manager on a contract until the end of the 2014–15 season. Teale was relieved of his managerial duties after the final game of the season, as St Mirren appointed Ian Murray as their new manager on 22 May 2015. On 1 June 2015, Teale left St Mirren by mutual consent, after failing to secure the manager's job on a permanent basis.

== International career ==
Teale made his debut for Scotland under-21s against Latvia in 1996.

Teale's performances for Wigan earned him a call-up to the Scotland national football team for the first time in 2004, but was forced to withdraw from the squad due to injury. He won his first cap in a 3–1 defeat to Switzerland on 1 March 2006.

He has represented his country on an intermittent basis, notably contributing to Scotland's Euro 2008 qualifying campaign.

In 2008, he was called up to George Burley's first Scotland squad alongside fellow on loan Plymouth player Russell Anderson.

== Career statistics ==
=== Playing statistics ===
As of 2 December 2014

Appearances and goals by club, season and competition
Club	Season	League			FA Cup		League Cup		Other		Total	
Club	Season	Division	Apps	Goals	Apps	Goals	Apps	Goals	Apps	Goals	Apps	Goals
Clydebank	1995–96	Scottish First Division	15	1	1	0	1	0	—		17	1
Clydebank	1996–97	Scottish First Division	33	6	1	0	1	0	—		35	6
Clydebank	1997–98	Scottish Second Division	28	6	—		1	0	3	0	32	6
Clydebank	1998–99	Scottish First Division	8	3	—		2	0	—		10	3
Clydebank	Total		84	16	2	0	6	0	3	0	95	16
Ayr United	1998–99	Scottish First Division	23	4	4	1	—		—		27	5
Ayr United	1999–2000	Scottish First Division	32	0	5	2	2	0	1	0	40	2
Ayr United	2000–01	Scottish First Division	31	5	1	0	1	0	1	0	34	5
Ayr United	2001–02	Scottish First Division	18	4	—		3	1	2	1	23	6
Ayr United	Total		104	13	10	3	6	1	4	1	124	21
Wigan Athletic	2001–02	Second Division	23	1	—		—		—		23	1
Wigan Athletic	2002–03	Second Division	38	2	2	0	4	0	2	2	46	4
Wigan Athletic	2003–04	First Division	28	2	1	0	1	0	—		30	2
Wigan Athletic	2004–05	Championship	37	3	1	0	1	0	—		39	3
Wigan Athletic	2005–06	Premier League	24	0	2	0	7	0	—		33	0
Wigan Athletic	2006–07	Premier League	12	0	1	0	1	0	—		14	0
Wigan Athletic	Total		162	8	7	0	14	0	2	2	185	10
Derby County	2006–07	Championship	16	1	—		—		1	0	17	1
Derby County	2007–08	Premier League	18	0	3	0	1	0	—		22	0
Derby County	2008–09	Championship	25	1	4	0	5	0	—		34	1
Derby County	2009–10	Championship	28	2	2	0	1	1	—		31	3
Derby County	Total		87	4	9	0	7	1	1	0	104	5
Plymouth Argyle (loan)	2007–08	Championship	12	0	—		—		—		12	0
Barnsley (loan)	2008–09	Championship	3	0	—		—		—		3	0
Sheffield Wednesday	2010–11	League One	41	2	5	2	2	0	3	1	51	5
St Mirren	2011–12	Scottish Premier League	34	0	6	1	3	1	—		43	2
St Mirren	2012–13	Scottish Premier League	30	0	3	0	4	1	—		37	1
St Mirren	2013–14	Scottish Premiership	16	0	1	0	1	0	—		18	0
St Mirren	2014–15	Scottish Premiership	5	0	1	0	1	0	—		7	0
St Mirren	Total		85	0	11	1	9	2	0	0	105	3
Career total			578	43	43	6	44	4	13	4	678	57

=== Managerial statistics ===
As of 23 May 2015

Team	Nat	From	To	Record				
Team	Nat	From	To	G	W	D	L	Win %
St Mirren	(Scotland)	9 December 2014	23 May 2015	23	7	1	15	30.43

- Includes statistics as caretaker manager.

== Honours ==
Clydebank

- Scottish Football League Second Division promotion: 1997–98

Wigan Athletic

- Football League Second Division: 2002–03
- Football League Championship second-place promotion: 2004–05
- Football League Cup runner-up: 2005–06

St Mirren

- Scottish League Cup: 2012–13

Scotland

- Kirin Cup: 2006
