= 2012–13 Bristol City F.C. season =

Bristol City
2012–13 season
- Chairman: Keith Dawe
- Manager: Derek McInnes (until 12 January); Sean O'Driscoll (from 14 January)
- Stadium: Ashton Gate Stadium
- Championship: 24th (relegated)
- FA Cup: Third round
- Football League Cup: First round
- Top goalscorer: League: Steve Davies (13); All: Steve Davies (13)
- Highest home attendance: 15,692(vs Leeds United, 29 September 2012)
- Lowest home attendance: 4,339 (vs Gillingham), 14 August 2012, LGCP
Home colours	Away colours

The 2012–13 season was Bristol City's 111th season in the Football League. It was their 6th in the Football League Championship (Second Tier) since joining in 2007.

Bristol City had three kits that season, using the previous season's away kit (yellow and navy) as their third kit. However, it was never used in the campaign.

== League table ==
Pos	Team	Pld	W	D	L	GF	GA	GD	Pts	Promotion or relegation
20	Millwall	46	15	11	20	51	62	−11	56	
21	Barnsley	46	14	13	19	56	70	−14	55	
22	Peterborough United (R)	46	15	9	22	66	75	−9	54	Relegation to Football League One
23	Wolverhampton Wanderers (R)	46	14	9	23	55	69	−14	51	Relegation to Football League One
24	Bristol City (R)	46	11	8	27	59	84	−25	41	Relegation to Football League One

Updated to match(es) played on 4 May 2013. Source: BBC Sport
Rules for classification: 1) points; 2) goal difference; 3) number of goals scored.
(R) Relegated

== Squad ==
No.	Name	Position (s)	Nationality	Place of birth	Date of birth (age)	Club caps	Club goals	Int. caps	Int. goals	Date signed	Signed from	Fee	Contract End
Goalkeepers
1	Tom Heaton	GK	(England)	Chester	15 April 1986 (aged 27)	–	–	–	–	27 July 2012	Cardiff City	Free	30 June 2013
22	Dean Gerken	GK	(England)	Rochford	22 May 1985 (aged 28)	56	0	–	–	1 July 2009	Colchester United	£400,000	30 June 2013
32	Lewis Carey	GK	(England)	Tunbridge Wells	2 June 1993 (aged 19)	–	–	–	–	1 July 2012	Academy	Trainee	30 June 2013
Defenders
2	Richard Foster	RB/LB/LM	(Scotland)	Aberdeen	31 July 1985 (aged 27)	21	0	–	–	6 January 2012	Aberdeen	£260,000	30 June 2014
3	Mark Wilson	RB/LB/RM	(Scotland)	Glasgow	5 June 1984 (aged 28)	–	–	1	0	16 August 2012	Celtic	Free	30 June 2013
4	Liam Fontaine	CB/LB	(England)	London	7 January 1986 (aged 27)	244	6	–	–	12 June 2006	Fulham	£200,000	30 June 2014
5	Lewin Nyatanga	CB/LB	(Wales)	Burton upon Trent (England)	18 August 1988 (aged 24)	90	2	34	0	14 July 2009	Derby County	£500,000	30 June 2013
6	Louis Carey	CB/RB	(Scotland)	Bristol (England)	22 January 1977 (aged 36)	625	15	–	–	31 January 2005	Coventry City	Free	30 June 2013
12	James Wilson	CB/LB/RB	(Wales)	Chepstow	26 February 1989 (aged 24)	28	1	–	–	6 May 2006	Academy	Trainee	30 June 2014
17	Greg Cunningham	LB/LM	(Republic of Ireland)	Carnmore	31 January 1991 (aged 22)	–	–	2	0	5 July 2012	Manchester City	Undisclosed	30 June 2016
19	Brendan Moloney	RB/CB/LB	(Republic of Ireland)	Killarney	18 January 1989 (aged 24)	–	–	–	–	25 January 2013	Nottingham Forest	Free	30 June 2015
28	Aaron Amadi-Holloway	CB/RB/LB	(Wales)		21 February 1993 (aged 20)	–	–	–	–	1 July 2012	Academy	Trainee	30 June 2013
39	Matthew Bates	CB/RB/DM	(England)	Stockton	10 December 1986 (aged 26)	–	–	–	–	17 November 2012	Free agent	Free	30 June 2013
Midfielders
8	Neil Kilkenny	CM/AM	(Australia)	Enfield (England)	19 December 1985 (aged 27)	43	1	14	0	24 June 2011	Leeds United	Free	30 June 2014
10	Liam Kelly	CM/DM/RM	(Scotland)	Milton Keynes (England)	10 February 1990 (aged 23)	–	–	1	0	11 January 2013	Kilmarnock	£220,000	30 June 2016
11	Brian Howard	CM/LM	(England)	Winchester	23 January 1983 (aged 30)	–	–	–	–	15 February 2013	Free agent	Free	30 June 2013
14	Cole Skuse	DM/RM	(England)	Bristol	29 March 1986 (aged 27)	280	9	–	–	1 July 2004	Academy	Trainee	30 June 2013
15	Stephen Pearson	LM/CM/AM	(Scotland)	Lanark	2 October 1982 (aged 30)	30	3	10	0	6 January 2012	Derby County	Free	30 June 2014
21	Paul Anderson	RW/LW	(England)	Melton Mowbray	23 July 1988 (aged 24)	–	–	–	–	26 July 2012	Nottingham Forest	Free	30 June 2014
24	Bobby Reid	CM/AM	(England)	Bristol	2 February 1993 (aged 20)	1	0	–	–	29 April 2011	Academy	Trainee	30 June 2015
25	Marvin Elliott	DM/CM	(Jamaica)	London (England)	15 September 1984 (aged 28)	199	18	6	1	30 July 2007	Millwall	£440,000	30 June 2014
26	Joe Bryan	LM/LB	(England)	Bristol	17 September 1993 (aged 19)	1	0	–	–	1 August 2011	Academy	Trainee	30 June 2015
27	Albert Adomah	RM/RW	(Ghana)	London (England)	13 December 1987 (aged 25)	95	10	3	0	1 July 2011	Barnet	£150,000	30 June 2014
35	Toby Ajala	WG/ST	(England)	London	27 September 1991 (aged 21)	–	–	–	–	2012	Hayes & Yeading United	Free	30 June 2013
Forwards
7	Sam Baldock	ST/RW	(England)	Buckingham	15 March 1989 (aged 24)	–	–	–	–	21 August 2012	West Ham United	£1,100,000	30 June 2015
9	Jon Stead	ST/RW	(England)	Huddersfield	7 April 1983 (aged 30)	53	15	–	–	23 August 2010	Ipswich Town	£250,000	30 June 2013
16	Steve Davies	ST/LW	(England)	Liverpool	29 December 1987 (aged 25)	–	–	–	–	20 August 2012	Derby County	£750,000	30 June 2015
18	Ryan Taylor	ST	(England)	Rotherham	4 May 1988 (aged 25)	8	1	–	–	1 July 2011	Rotherham United	Undisclosed	30 June 2014
29	Wesley Burns	ST/RW/CM	(Wales)	Cardiff	28 October 1995 (aged 17)	–	–	–	–	18 December 2012	Academy	Trainee	30 June 2014

=== Statistics ===
As of 11 June 2013

No.	Pos	Nat	Player	Total		Championship		FA Cup		League Cup	
No.	Pos	Nat	Player	Apps	Goals	Apps	Goals	Apps	Goals	Apps	Goals
1	GK	(England) ENG	Tom Heaton	44	0	43	0	1	0	0	0
2	DF	(Scotland) SCO	Richard Foster	31	0	27+3	0	0	0	1	0
3	DF	(Scotland) SCO	Mark Wilson	8	0	7	0	1	0	0	0
4	DF	(England) ENG	Liam Fontaine	43	1	41	1	1	0	1	0
5	DF	(Wales) WAL	Lewin Nyatanga	20	2	18+1	2	0	0	1	0
6	DF	(Scotland) SCO	Louis Carey	17	0	13+3	0	1	0	0	0
7	FW	(England) ENG	Sam Baldock	34	10	23+11	10	0	0	0	0
8	MF	(Australia) AUS	Neil Kilkenny	24	0	15+9	0	0	0	0	0
9	FW	(England) ENG	Jon Stead	30	5	21+7	5	1	0	1	0
10	MF	(Scotland) SCO	Liam Kelly	19	0	19	0	0	0	0	0
11	MF	(England) ENG	Brian Howard	6	0	0+6	0	0	0	0	0
12	DF	(Wales) WAL	James Wilson	8	0	6+1	0	1	0	0	0
14	MF	(England) ENG	Cole Skuse	27	0	24+1	0	1	0	1	0
15	MF	(Scotland) SCO	Stephen Pearson	38	3	33+3	3	1	0	1	0
16	FW	(England) ENG	Steve Davies	38	13	21+16	13	0+1	0	0	0
17	DF	(Republic of Ireland) IRL	Greg Cunningham	31	1	29+1	1	1	0	0	0
18	FW	(England) ENG	Ryan Taylor	26	1	16+9	1	1	0	0	0
19	DF	(Republic of Ireland) IRL	Brendan Moloney	17	0	17	0	0	0	0	0
21	MF	(England) ENG	Paul Anderson	30	3	18+11	3	1	0	0	0
22	GK	(England) ENG	Dean Gerken	4	0	3	0	0	0	1	0
24	MF	(England) ENG	Bobby Reid	5	1	1+3	1	0+1	0	0	0
25	MF	(England) ENG	Marvin Elliott	33	3	25+7	2	0	0	0+1	1
26	MF	(England) ENG	Joe Bryan	12	0	9+3	0	0	0	0	0
27	MF	(England) ENG	Albert Adomah	42	7	30+11	7	0	0	1	0
28	DF	(Wales) WAL	Aaron Amadi-Holloway	0	0	0	0	0	0	0	0
29	DF	(Wales) WAL	Wes Burns	7	0	0+7	0	0	0	0	0
32	GK	(England) ENG	Lewis Carey	0	0	0	0	0	0	0	0
39	DF	(England) ENG	Matthew Bates	13	0	12+1	0	0	0	0	0
Players featured for club who have left:
7	MF	(Democratic Republic of the Congo) COD	Yannick Bolasie	1	0	0	0	0	0	0+1	0
10	FW	Jersey	Brett Pitman	4	0	0+3	0	0	0	1	0
11	MF	(England) ENG	Martyn Woolford	17	3	10+5	3	0+1	0	1	0
19	DF	(Scotland) SCO	Stephen McManus (on loan from Middlesbrough)	11	1	11	1	0	0	0	0
20	MF	(England) ENG	Jody Morris	4	0	2+1	0	0	0	1	0
29	DF	(England) ENG	Matthew Briggs (on loan from Fulham)	4	0	4	0	0	0	0	0
30	DF	(Cameroon) CMR	George Elokobi (on loan from Wolverhampton Wanderers)	1	0	1	0	0	0	0	0
38	MF	(England) ENG	Neil Danns (on loan from Leicester City)	9	2	9	2	0	0	0	0
40	DF	(Scotland) SCO	Danny Wilson (on loan from Liverpool)	1	0	1	0	0	0	0	0

==== Goalscorers ====
Rank	No.	Pos.	Name	Championship	FA Cup	League Trophy	Total	
1	16	FW	Steve Davies	13	0	0	13	
2	7	FW	Sam Baldock	10	0	0	10	
3	27	MF	Albert Adomah	7	0	0	7	
4	9	FW	Jon Stead	5	0	0	5	
5	21	MF	Paul Anderson	3	0	0	3	
5	25	MF	Marvin Elliott	2	0	1	3	
5	15	MF	Stephen Pearson	3	0	0	3	
5	~~11~~	MF	Martyn Woolford	3	0	0	3	
5	Own Goals			3	0	0	3	
10	5	DF	Lewin Nyatanga	2	0	0	2	
10	~~38~~	MF	Neil Danns	2	0	0	2	
12	17	DF	Greg Cunningham	1	0	0	1	
12	4	DF	Liam Fontaine	1	0	0	1	
12	~~19~~	DF	Stephen McManus	1	0	0	1	
12	18	MF	Ryan Taylor	1	0	0	1	
12	Total				57	0	1	58

==== Disciplinary record ====
No.	Pos.	Name	Championship		FA Cup		League Cup		Total	
No.	Pos.	Name	Yellow card	Red card	Yellow card	Red card	Yellow card	Red card	Yellow card	Red card
1	GK	Tom Heaton	1	0	0	0	0	0	1	0
2	DF	Stephen Foster	3	0	0	0	0	0	3	0
4	DF	Liam Fontaine	4	0	1	0	1	0	6	0
5	DF	Lewin Nyatanga	1	0	0	0	0	0	1	0
6	DF	Louis Carey	3	0	0	0	0	0	3	0
7	FW	Sam Baldock	2	0	0	0	0	0	2	0
8	MF	Neil Kilkenny	3	0	0	0	0	0	3	0
10	MF	Liam Kelly	1	0	0	0	0	0	1	0
~~11~~	MF	Martyn Woolford	0	0	0	0	1	0	1	0
12	DF	James Wilson	1	0	0	0	0	0	1	0
14	MF	Cole Skuse	2	0	0	0	0	0	2	0
15	MF	Stephen Pearson	3	0	0	0	0	0	3	0
16	FW	Steve Davies	5	0	0	0	0	0	5	0
17	DF	Greg Cunningham	4	0	0	0	0	0	4	0
19	DF	Stephen McManus	1	0	0	0	0	0	1	0
20	MF	Jody Morris	1	0	0	0	0	0	1	0
25	MF	Marvin Elliott	1	0	0	0	0	0	1	0
26	MF	Joe Bryan	1	0	0	0	0	0	1	0
27	MF	Albert Adomah	2	0	0	0	0	0	2	0
29	DF	Wes Burns	1	0	0	0	0	0	1	0
~~38~~	MF	Neil Danns	2	0	0	0	0	0	2	0
Total			40	0	1	0	2	0	43	0

== Fixtures and results ==
=== Pre-season ===
28 July 2012 Friendly	St Johnstone	2–1	Bristol City	Perth
15:00 BST	Vine 3', 37'		Stead 45'	Stadium: McDiarmid Park

30 July 2012 Friendly	Kilmarnock	2–3	Bristol City	Kilmarnock
19:45 BST		report		Stadium: Rugby Park

1 August 2012 Friendly	Dunfermline Athletic	0–2	Bristol City	Dunfermline
19:45 BST				Stadium: East End Park

4 August 2012 Testimonial Match	Bristol City	3–0	Bristol Rovers	Bristol
15:00 BST				Stadium: Ashton Gate

7 August 2012 Friendly	Bristol City	1–1	Southampton	Bristol
19:45 BST	Stead 36'	Report	Sharp 90+2'	Stadium: Ashton Gate; Attendance: 2,605; Referee: Brendan Malone

11 August 2012 Friendly	Bournemouth	0–2	Bristol City	Bournemouth
15:00 BST				Stadium: Seward Stadium

=== Championship ===
18 August 2012 1	Nottingham Forest	1–0	Bristol City	Nottingham
15:00 BST	Guedioura 71'	Report		Stadium: City Ground; Attendance: 21,575; Referee: Miller

21 August 2012 2	Bristol City	4–1	Crystal Palace	Bristol
19:45 BST	Taylor 9'; Woolford 12'; Stead 59' (pen.); Adomah 82'	Report	74' Dikgacoi	Stadium: Ashton Gate; Attendance: 12,221; Referee: Naylor

25 August 2012 3	Bristol City	4–2	Cardiff City	Bristol
13:00 BST	Pearson 32'; Woolford 12', 70'; Baldock 87'	Report	57' Mason; 82' Heiðar Helguson	Stadium: Ashton Gate; Attendance: 14,368; Referee: Jones

1 September 2012 4	Barnsley	1–0	Bristol City	Barnsley
15:00 BST	Mellis 50'; Hassell (red card) 52'	Report		Stadium: Oakwell; Attendance: 8,088; Referee: Rushton

15 September 2012 5	Bristol City	3–5	Blackburn Rovers	Bristol
15:00 BST	Adomah 1'; Pearson 69'; Baldock 83'	Report	28', 90+6' Rhodes; 55' Nuno Gomes; 81' Rochina; 90+2' Dann	Stadium: Ashton Gate; Attendance: 14,657; Referee: Scott

18 September 2012 6	Peterborough United	1–2	Bristol City	Peterborough
19:45 BST	Tomlin 90+3' (pen.)	Report	56', 62' Baldock	Stadium: London Road Stadium; Attendance: 5,435; Referee: Sarginson

22 September 2012 7	Watford	2–2	Bristol City	Watford
15:00 BST	Wilson 59' (o.g.); Vydra 72'	Report	63' Elliott; 83' Davies	Stadium: Vicarage Road; Attendance: 11,886; Referee: Sheldrake

29 September 2012 8	Bristol City	2–3	Leeds United	Bristol
15:00 BST	Adomah 70'; Austin 90+3'	Report	63', 80' Diouf; 83' Tonge	Stadium: Ashton Gate; Attendance: 15,692; Referee: Attwell

2 October 2012 9	Bristol City	1–1	Millwall	Bristol
19:45 BST	Davies 28'	Report	38' Henderson	Stadium: Ashton Gate; Attendance: 12,010; Referee: Woolmer

6 October 2012 10	Leicester City	2–0	Bristol City	Leicester
15:00 BST	Nugent 19'; Foster 74' (o.g.)	Report		Stadium: King Power Stadium; Attendance: 22,529; Referee: Kettle

20 October 2012 11	Bolton Wanderers	3–2	Bristol City	Bolton
15:00 BST	Eagles 31'; Spearing 62'; Petrov 82'	Report	3', 21' (pen.) Davies	Stadium: Reebok Stadium; Attendance: 17,259; Referee: Brown

23 October 2012 12	Bristol City	3–4	Burnley	Bristol
19:45 BST	Davies 17'; Baldock 77' (pen.); Anderson 90+1'	Report	9', 59' (pen.) Austin; 60' Paterson; 90+6' McCann	Stadium: Ashton Gate; Attendance: 11,836; Referee: Collins

27 October 2012 13	Bristol City	1–2	Hull City	Bristol
15:00 BST	Davies 25'	Report	8' Aluko; 65' (o.g.) Skuse	Stadium: Ashton Gate; Attendance: 12,354; Referee: Graham

3 November 2012 14	Huddersfield Town	1–0	Bristol City	Huddersfield
15:00 GMT	Scannell 43'	Report		Stadium: John Smith's Stadium; Attendance: 12,561; Referee: Salisbury

6 November 2012 15	Birmingham City	2–0	Bristol City	Birmingham
19:45 GMT	Burke 59'; King 73'	Report		Stadium: St Andrew's; Attendance: 14,380; Referee: Tierney

11 November 2012 16	Bristol City	0–2	Charlton Athletic	Bristol
15:00 GMT		Report	Haynes 20'; Morrison 56'	Stadium: Ashton Gate; Attendance: 13,009; Referee: Gibbs

17 November 2012 17	Bristol City	1–1	Blackpool	Bristol
15:00 GMT	Davies 81' (pen.)	Report	90' (pen.) Ince	Stadium: Ashton Gate; Attendance: 12,009; Referee: Ward

24 November 2012 18	Middlesbrough	1–3	Bristol City	Middlesbrough
15:00 GMT	Miller 35'	Report	13' Adomah; 63' Pearson; 89' Davies	Stadium: Riverside Stadium; Attendance: 20,585; Referee: Swarbrick

27 November 2012 19	Brighton & Hove Albion	2–0	Bristol City	Brighton
19:45 GMT	Hammond 6'; Orlandi 26'	Report		Stadium: Amex Stadium; Attendance: 24,044; Referee: Whitestone

1 December 2012 20	Bristol City	1–4	Wolverhampton Wanderers	Bristol
15:00 GMT	Danns 85'	Report	20' Ebanks-Blake; 25', 41' Doyle; 44' Sigurðarson	Stadium: Ashton Gate; Attendance: 13,892; Referee: Stroud

8 December 2012 21	Sheffield Wednesday	2–3	Bristol City	Sheffield
15:00 GMT	Llera 3'; Madine 79'	Report	18' (pen.), 86' (pen.) Baldock; 88' Adomah	Stadium: Hillsborough Stadium; Attendance: 20,449; Referee: Marriner

15 December 2012 22	Bristol City	0–2	Derby County	Bristol
15:00 GMT		Report	34' Hendrick; 36' Bryson	Stadium: Ashton Gate; Attendance: 12,526; Referee: D'Urso

22 December 2012 23	Ipswich Town	1–1	Bristol City	Ipswich
15:00 GMT	Smith 32'	Report	11' Danns	Stadium: Portman Road; Attendance: 17,290; Referee: Haywood

26 December 2012	Bristol City	P–P	Watford	Bristol
15:00 GMT		Report		Stadium: Ashton Gate; Attendance: 12,783; Referee: Naylor

29 December 2012 24	Bristol City	4–2	Peterborough United	Bristol
15:00 GMT	Anderson 5'; Baldock 37', 64' (pen.); McManus 59'	Report	(red card) 12' Tomlin; 19' (pen.) Grant McCann; 89' Gayle	Stadium: Ashton Gate; Attendance: 12,991; Referee: Madley

1 January 2013 25	Millwall	2–1	Bristol City	Millwall
15:00 GMT	N'Guessan 19'; A Smith 75'	Report	63' Stead	Stadium: The Den; Attendance: 9,784; Referee: East

12 January 2013 26	Bristol City	0–4	Leicester City	Bristol
15:00 GMT		Report	11', 18', 41' Wood; 49' James	Stadium: Ashton Gate; Attendance: 13,078; Referee: Langford

19 January 2013 27	Leeds United	1–0	Bristol City	Leeds
15:00 GMT	McCormack 67'	Report		Stadium: Elland Road; Attendance: 18,156; Referee: Sheldrake

26 January 2013 28	Bristol City	2–1	Ipswich Town	Bristol
15:00 GMT	Davies 47'; Stead 90'	Report	30' Murphy	Stadium: Ashton Gate; Attendance: 12,662; Referee: Stephen Martin

29 January 2013 29	Bristol City	2–0	Watford	Bristol
19:45 GMT	Cunningham 43'; Anderson 65'	Report		Stadium: Ashton Gate; Attendance: 13,586; Referee: Carl Berry

2 February 2013 30	Blackburn Rovers	2–0	Bristol City	Blackburn
15:00 GMT	Rhodes 28', 65'	Report		Stadium: Ewood Park; Attendance: 13,539; Referee: Haywood

9 February 2013 31	Bristol City	2–0	Nottingham Forest	Bristol
15:00 GMT	Davies 50'; Elliott 62'	Report		Stadium: Ashton Gate; Attendance: 13,768; Referee: Pawson

16 February 2013 32	Cardiff City	2–1	Bristol City	Cardiff
15:00 GMT	Campbell 45', 58'	Report	90' (o.g.) Nugent	Stadium: Cardiff City Stadium; Attendance: 25,586; Referee: Ilderton

19 February 2013 33	Crystal Palace	2–1	Bristol City	London
19:45 GMT	Murray 34'; Dobbie 65'	Report	90' (o.g.) Parr	Stadium: Selhurst Park; Attendance: 16,191; Referee: Hooper

23 February 2013 34	Bristol City	5–3	Barnsley	Bristol
15:00 GMT	Stead 16', 52'; Fontaine 35'; Nyatanga 55'; Davies 67'	Report	58' O'Grady; 82' Cywka; 90' Scotland	Stadium: Ashton Gate; Attendance: 13,008; Referee: Mathieson

2 March 2013 35	Blackpool	0–0	Bristol City	Blackpool
15:00 GMT		Report		Stadium: Bloomfield Road; Attendance: 12,934; Referee: Russell

5 March 2013 36	Bristol City	0–0	Brighton & Hove Albion	Bristol
19:45 GMT		Report		Attendance: 12,267; Referee: Drysdale

9 March 2013 37	Bristol City	2–0	Middlesbrough	Bristol
15:00 GMT	Adomah 32'; Davies 52'	Report		Stadium: Ashton Gate; Attendance: 13,524; Referee: Scott

16 March 2013 38	Wolverhampton Wanderers	2–1	Bristol City	Wolverhampton
15:00 GMT	Ebanks-Blake 76'; Doyle 78'	Report	25' (o.g.) Davis	Stadium: Molineux Stadium; Attendance: 21,711; Referee: Geoff Eltrigham

29 March 2013 39	Derby County	3–0	Bristol City	Derby
19:45 GMT	Hendrick 36'; Ward 54'; Davies 90'	Report		Stadium: Pride Park Stadium; Attendance: 23,483; Referee: Boyeson

1 April 2013 40	Bristol City	1–1	Sheffield Wednesday	Bristol
15:00 GMT	Baldock 90+2'	Report	Johnson 36'	Stadium: Ashton Gate; Attendance: 19,148; Referee: Deadman

6 April 2013 41	Burnley	3–1	Bristol City	Burnley
15:00 GMT	Shackell 52'; McCann 61'; Paterson 90+1'	Report	Adomah 35'	Stadium: Turf Moor; Attendance: 11,539; Referee: Adcock

13 April 2013 42	Bristol City	1–2	Bolton Wanderers	Bristol
15:00 GMT	Davies 49'	Report	Fontaine (o.g.); Davies 79' (pen.)	Stadium: Ashton Gate; Attendance: 12,935; Referee: Haywood

16 April 2013 43	Bristol City	0–1	Birmingham City	Bristol
17:45 GMT		Report Relegated	Elliott 16'	Stadium: Ashton Gate; Attendance: 12,093; Referee: Naylor

19 April 2013 44	Hull City	0–0	Bristol City	Hull
19:45 BST		Report		Stadium: KC Stadium; Attendance: 18,595; Referee: Oliver

27 April 2013 45	Bristol City	1–3	Huddersfield Town	Bristol
15:00 GMT	Nyatanga 90'	Report	Vaughan 1', 13', 64'	Stadium: Ashton Gate; Attendance: 13,376; Referee: Tierney

4 May 2013 46	Charlton Athletic	4–1	Bristol City	London
12:45 GMT	Kermorgant 47', 51'; Obika 79'; Jackson 85'	Report	Reid 59'	Stadium: The Valley; Attendance: 18,981; Referee: Carl Berry

=== FA Cup ===
5 January 2013 Round 3	Blackburn Rovers	2–0	Bristol City	Blackburn
15:00 GMT	Murphy 7'; G Hanley 58'	Report		Stadium: Ewood Park; Attendance: 5,504; Referee: Miller

=== Football League Cup ===
14 August 2012 Round 1	Bristol City	1–2	Gillingham	Bristol
19:45 BST	Elliott 90+5'	Report	Kedwell 45' (pen.); Strevens 54'	Stadium: Ashton Gate; Attendance: 4,339; Referee: David Coote

== Transfers ==
=== In ===
No.	Pos.	Nat.	Name	Age	EU	Moving from	Type	Transfer window	Ends	Transfer fee	Source
20	MF	(England)	Jody Morris	33	EU	St Johnstone (Scotland)	Free	Summer	2013	Free	
17	DF	(Republic of Ireland)	Greg Cunningham	21	EU	Manchester City	Transfer	Summer	2016	Undisclosed	
21	MF	(England)	Paul Anderson	24	EU	Nottingham Forest	Free	Summer	2014	Free	
1	GK	(England)	Tom Heaton	26	EU	Cardiff City (Wales)	Free	Summer	2013	Free	
3	DF	(Scotland)	Mark Wilson	28	EU	Celtic (Scotland)	Free	Summer	2013	Free	
16	FW	(England)	Steve Davies	24	EU	Derby County	Transfer	Summer	2015	£750,000	
7	FW	(England)	Sam Baldock	23	EU	West Ham United	Transfer	Summer	2016	£1,100,000	
39	DF	(England)	Matthew Bates	25	EU	Free agent	Free transfer		2013	Free	
10	MF	(Scotland) (England)	Liam Kelly	22	EU	Kilmarnock (Scotland)	Transfer	Winter	2016	£220,000	
19	DF	(Republic of Ireland) (England)	Brendan Moloney	24	EU	Nottingham Forest	Free transfer	Winter	2015	Free	
11	MF	(England)	Brian Howard	30	EU	Free agent	Free transfer		2013	Free	

=== Loans in ===
No.	Pos.	Name	Country	Age	Loan club	Started	Ended	Start source	End source
30	DF	George Elokobi	(Cameroon)	26	Wolverhampton Wanderers	26 September	27 December		
19	DF	Stephen McManus	(Scotland)	30	Middlesbrough	17 October	17 January		
29	DF	Matthew Briggs	(England)	21	Fulham	26 October	26 November		
38	MF	Neil Danns	(England)	30	Leicester City	15 November	3 January		
40	DF	Danny Wilson	(Scotland)	21	Liverpool	22 November	January		

Sources: For loan start source see "Start source". For loan end source see "End source".
EU = if holds or not a European Union passport; Country: when 2 flags, 1st flag = country that plays for internationally, 2nd flag = country of birth; No. = number on jersey; P = Position (for position name, pause mouse pointer on abbreviation); Name = Name on jersey (for more extensive name, pause mouse pointer on name); In/Out = In: The player came in on loan, Out: The player went out on loan; Loan club = the club that the player moved on loan to or the club that the player came from on loan; Started = the date when the player's loan started; Ended = the date when the player's loan ended.

=== Out ===
No.	Pos.	Name	Country	Age	Type	Moving to	Transfer window	Transfer fee	Apps	Goals	Source
25	DF	Danny Ball	(England)	20	Contract ended	Bath City	Summer	Free	0	0	Non League Daily
20	MF	Jamal Campbell-Ryce	(Jamaica) (England)	29	Contract ended	Notts County	Summer	Free	65	2	
16	FW	David Clarkson	(Scotland)	26	Contract ended	Bristol Rovers	Summer	Free	63	11	
24	FW	Marlon Jackson	(England)	21	Contract ended	Hereford United	Summer	Free	5	0	
1	GK	David James	(England)	41	Contract ended		Summer	Free	79	0	
3	DF	Jamie McAllister	(Scotland)	34	Contract ended	Yeovil Town	Summer	Free	210	4	
30	DF	Henry Muggeridge	(England)	-	Contract ended		Summer	Free	0	0	
19	DF	Christian Ribeiro	(Wales)	22	Contract ended	Scunthorpe United	Summer	Free	17	0	
7	MF	Yannick Bolasie	(Democratic Republic of the Congo)	23	Transfer	Crystal Palace	Summer	£550,000	23	1	
10	FW	Brett Pitman	(Jersey)	24	Transfer	Bournemouth	Winter	Undisclosed	75	19	
11	MF	Martyn Woolford	(England)	27	Transfer	Millwall	Winter	Undisclosed	59	4	
23	DF	Joe Edwards	(England)	22	Transfer	Yeovil Town	Summer	Undisclosed	4	0	
20	MF	Jody Morris	(England)	34	Contract terminated	Free agent	Winter	Free	4	0	

EU = if holds or not a European Union passport; Country: when 2 flags, 1st flag = country that plays for internationally, 2nd flag = country of birth; N = number on jersey; P = Position (for position name, pause mouse pointer on abbreviation); Name = Name on jersey (for more extensive name, pause mouse pointer on name); Age = age on the day of the signing; Moving from = only indicate the club the player was playing before start playing for this club in this season, for the type of the moving see Status column; Moving to = only indicates the club the player is going to play next, for the type of the moving see Status column; Ends = when the player's current contract ends; n/a = Not applicable; Apps = Total number of competitive appearances (including substitute appearances) at the club prior to departure; Goals = Total number of competitive goals scored at the club prior to departure.

=== Loans out ===
No.	Pos.	Name	Country	Age	Loan club	Started	Ended	Start source	End source
23	DF	Joe Edwards	(England)	22	Yeovil Town	21 September	22 December		
10	FW	Brett Pitman	(Jersey)	24	Bournemouth	20 November	3 January		

Sources: For loan start source see "Start source". For loan end source see "End source".
EU = if holds or not a European Union passport; Country: when 2 flags, 1st flag = country that plays for internationally, 2nd flag = country of birth; No. = number on jersey; P = Position (for position name, pause mouse pointer on abbreviation); Name = Name on jersey (for more extensive name, pause mouse pointer on name); In/Out = In: The player came in on loan, Out: The player went out on loan; Loan club = the club that the player moved on loan to or the club that the player came from on loan; Started = the date when the player's loan started; Ended = the date when the player's loan ended.

=== Contracts ===
No.	Pos.	Nat.	Name	Age	Status	Contract length	Expiry date	Source
6	DF	(Scotland) (England)	Louis Carey	35	Signed	1 year	June 2013	
32	GK	(England)	Lewis Carey	19	Signed	1 year	June 2013	
23	DF	(England)	Joe Edwards	21	Signed	1 year	June 2013	
37	MF	(Scotland)	Stephen Pearson	29	Signed	2 years	June 2014	
29	MF	(Wales)	Aaron Amadi-Holloway	19	Signed	1 year	June 2013	
26	MF	(England)	Joe Bryan	19	Signed	3 years	June 2015	
24	MF	(England)	Bobby Reid	19	signed	3 years	June 2015	
39	DF	(England)	Matthew Bates	26	Signed	6 months	June 2013	
