= Lewin Nyatanga =

Wales international footballer

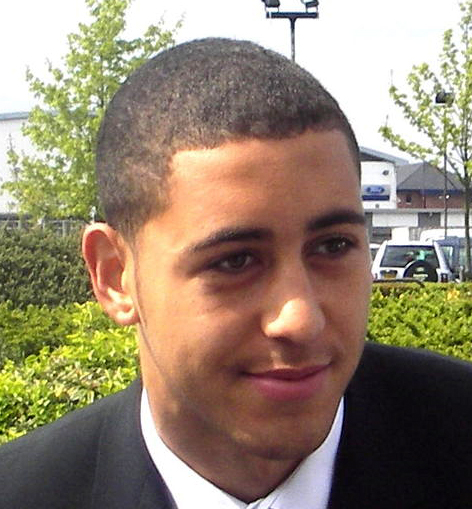
- Nyatanga while at Derby County in 2006

Personal information
- Full name: Lewin John Nyatanga
- Date of birth: 18 August 1988 (age 38)
- Place of birth: Burton upon Trent, England
- Height: 6 ft 2 in (1.88 m)
- Position: Defender

Youth career
- –2005: Derby County

Senior career*
Years	Team	Apps	(Gls)
2005–2009	Derby County	63	(4)
2006–2007	→ Sunderland (loan)	11	(0)
2007	→ Barnsley (loan)	10	(1)
2007–2008	→ Barnsley (loan)	25	(0)
2008	→ Barnsley (loan)	16	(1)
2009–2013	Bristol City	105	(4)
2010	→ Peterborough United (loan)	3	(0)
2013–2017	Barnsley	78	(7)
2016–2017	→ Northampton Town (loan)	37	(0)
Total		348	(17)

International career
2003–2005	Wales U17	8	(0)
2005–2008	Wales U21	10	(0)
2006–2011	Wales	34	(0)
- * Club domestic league appearances and goals

Lewin John Nyatanga (born 18 August 1988) is a former Wales international footballer who played as a defender. He played for Derby County, Bristol City, Sunderland, Peterborough United, Northampton Town and Barnsley in his career. He has made 34 international appearances for the Wales national team, having previously held the record for the youngest player to represent the country when he made his international debut at the age of 17. In February 2018, it was reported that he had retired from football to focus on family life and is now a personal trainer.

== Club career ==
=== Derby County ===
Nyatanga developed as a player through Derby's academy, signing professional terms for the club in August 2005 and making his senior debut in a League Cup tie against Grimsby Town, going on to feature in over half of Derby's league games during the 2005–06 season, primarily at centreback, scoring his first goal a 2–1 win over Stoke City.

Despite starting the 2006–07 season in the first team picture, Nyatanga lost his place in the first team and was loaned out to fellow Championship side Sunderland for four months in October 2006. Whilst at Sunderland, Nyatanga played left back due to an injury to Stephen Wright and Clive Clarke leaving on loan. Sunderland boss Roy Keane was reportedly interested in signing Nyatanga in a £1.5m move in January 2007. Derby manager Billy Davies said there was a possibility that Nyatanga could join Sunderland permanently, however, no bid was ever tabled by Sunderland.

Nyatanaga returned to Derby in January 2007, only to join Barnsley a month later on a three-month loan deal. Nyantanga helped the club to some vital wins during his time at Barnsley, including a surprise 1–0 win over promotion hopefuls Birmingham City and a vital 3–1 win away over relegation rivals Southend United. Nyantanga was recalled to Derby on 16 April after injury and suspension, respectively, to two key defenders in Michael Johnson and Darren Moore, left Derby with only one natural centre half. In his first game after returning to Derby he scored the winner against Luton Town on 20 April which sent Derby back into the automatic promotion places and relegated Luton. Nyatanga lost his place when Moore and Johnson returned, and was not in the 16 for the 2007 Playoff victory.

Nyatanga signed a new 4-year contract in the summer of 2007, and returned to Barnsley on a six-month loan shortly after. He formed an impressive partnership with Dennis Souza at the heart of Barnsley's defence, but was recalled by Derby in January 2008. On 19 January 2008, Nyatanga scored on his Premier League debut at Portsmouth in the 5th minute, which gave Derby a 1–0 lead, though Derby went on to lose the game 3–1 after a Benjani hat-trick. That was to be his only Premier League game of the season and his first of only 3 appearances for Derby that season, as he was sent back out on loan to Barnsley for the remainder of the 2007–8 season.

During the 2008–09 season, Nyatanga was initially out of the first team picture, behind Martin Albrechtsen and Dean Leacock. A season-ending injury to Leacock gave Nyatanga a chance to establish himself and he featured predominantly from November onwards, going on to make 30 league appearances, scoring once – the first in a 3–1 hammering of fierce local rivals Nottingham Forest. He also played in the League Cup semi final 1st leg against Manchester United, a game which Derby won 1–0.

=== Bristol City ===
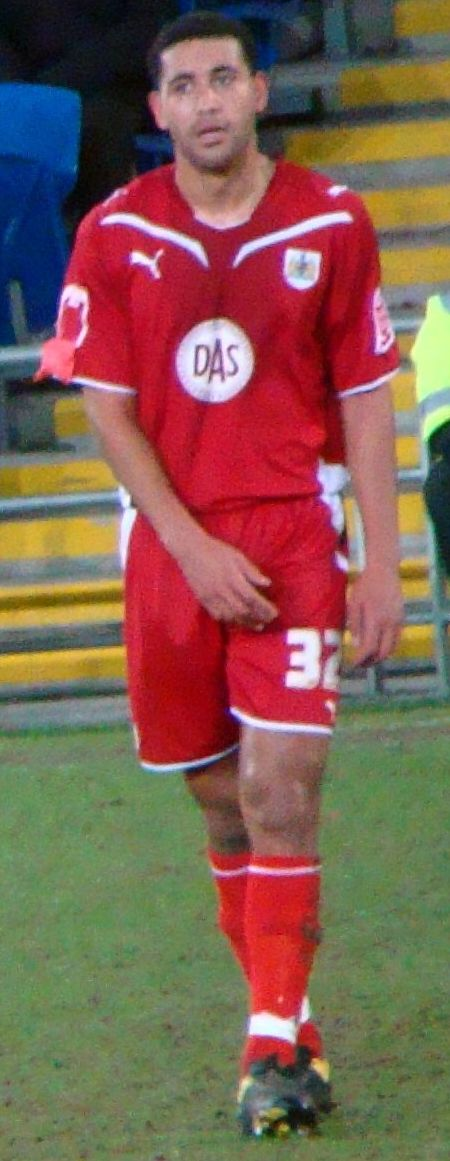
Nyatanga playing for Bristol City in 2010

On 14 July 2009, Nyatanga signed for Bristol City and agreed a four-year deal. He Scored his first goal for the club in a 2–2 draw with Newcastle United on 20 March 2010.

Nyatanga was injured during pre-season 2010–11, once recovered he was sent out on loan to Peterborough United to gain some match fitness.

=== Barnsley ===
On 9 July 2013, Nyatanga signed for Barnsley on a two-year deal following his departure from Bristol City.

On 8 August 2016, Nyatanga was loaned to Northampton Town for the season. Nyatanga was released from his Barnsley contract at the conclusion of the loan.

== International career ==
Born in Burton upon Trent, Staffordshire, England, Nyatanga qualifies for Wales through parentage, having been born to a Zimbabwean father and a Welsh mother. Nyatanga holds the records for being the youngest captain and youngest player ever to play for the Welsh Under-21s. On 1 March 2006, aged 17 years and 195 days, he made his full international debut for Wales in a friendly match against Paraguay in Cardiff, breaking Ryan Green's record as the youngest ever Welsh international. Despite his inexperience, with only 17 first team appearances for Derby behind him, he played "a key role" in the goalless draw. Wales' match against Trinidad and Tobago in May 2006 marked Nyatanga's second international appearance and also saw his age record broken by 16-year-old teammate Gareth Bale. He has mostly been a regular and was recalled to the U-21 team to help them qualify for the 2009 European Championships but they narrowly lost 5–4 on aggregate to England in the play-offs. His most recent appearance for Wales came in a Nations Cup match versus the Republic of Ireland in February 2011, replacing Sam Ricketts late in the 3–0 defeat.

== Career statistics ==
=== Club ===
As of match played 30 April 2017.

Appearances and goals by club, season and competition
Club	Season	League			FA Cup		League Cup		Other		Total	
Club	Season	Division	Apps	Goals	Apps	Goals	Apps	Goals	Apps	Goals	Apps	Goals
Derby County	2005–06	Championship	24	1	2	0	1	0	—		27	1
Derby County	2006–07	Championship	7	1	0	0	2	0	1 (Note: Appearance in Championship play-offs)	0	10	1
Derby County	2007–08	Premier League	2	1	2	0	—		—		4	1
Derby County	2008–09	Championship	30	1	2	0	3	0	—		35	1
Derby County	Total		63	4	6	0	6	0	1	0	76	4
Sunderland (loan)	2006–07	Championship	11	0	—		—		—		11	0
Barnsley (loan)	2006–07	Championship	10	1	—		—		—		10	1
Barnsley (loan)	2007–08	Championship	41	1	—		2	0	—		43	1
Barnsley (loan)	Total		51	2	—		2	0	—		53	2
Bristol City	2009–10	Championship	37	1	1	0	0	0	—		38	1
Bristol City	2010–11	Championship	20	1	1	0	0	0	—		21	1
Bristol City	2011–12	Championship	29	0	1	0	1	0	—		31	0
Bristol City	2012–13	Championship	19	2	0	0	1	0	—		20	2
Bristol City	Total		105	4	3	0	2	0	—		110	4
Peterborough United (loan)	2010–11	League One	3	0	—		—		—		3	0
Barnsley	2013–14	Championship	12	0	0	0	0	0	—		12	0
Barnsley	2014–15	League One	45	5	3	0	1	0	2 (Note: Appearance(s) in EFL Trophy)	0	51	5
Barnsley	2015–16	League One	21	2	1	0	2	0	4	1	28	3
Barnsley	2016–17	Championship	0	0	—		—		—		0	0
Barnsley	Total		78	7	4	0	3	0	6	1	91	8
Northampton Town (loan)	2016–17	League One	37	0	1	0	1	0	3	0	42	0
Career total			348	17	14	0	14	0	10	1	386	18

=== International ===
Appearances and goals by national team and year
National team	Year	Apps	Goals
Wales	2006	8	0
Wales	2007	9	0
Wales	2008	5	0
Wales	2009	9	0
Wales	2010	2	0
Wales	2011	1	0
Total		34	0

== Honours ==
Barnsley

- Football League One play-offs: 2016
- Football League Trophy: 2015–16

Individual

- Derby County Young Player of the Year: 2005–06
- Welsh Football Writer's Young Player of the Year: 2006
