= Jason Beardsley =

Association footballer (born 1989)

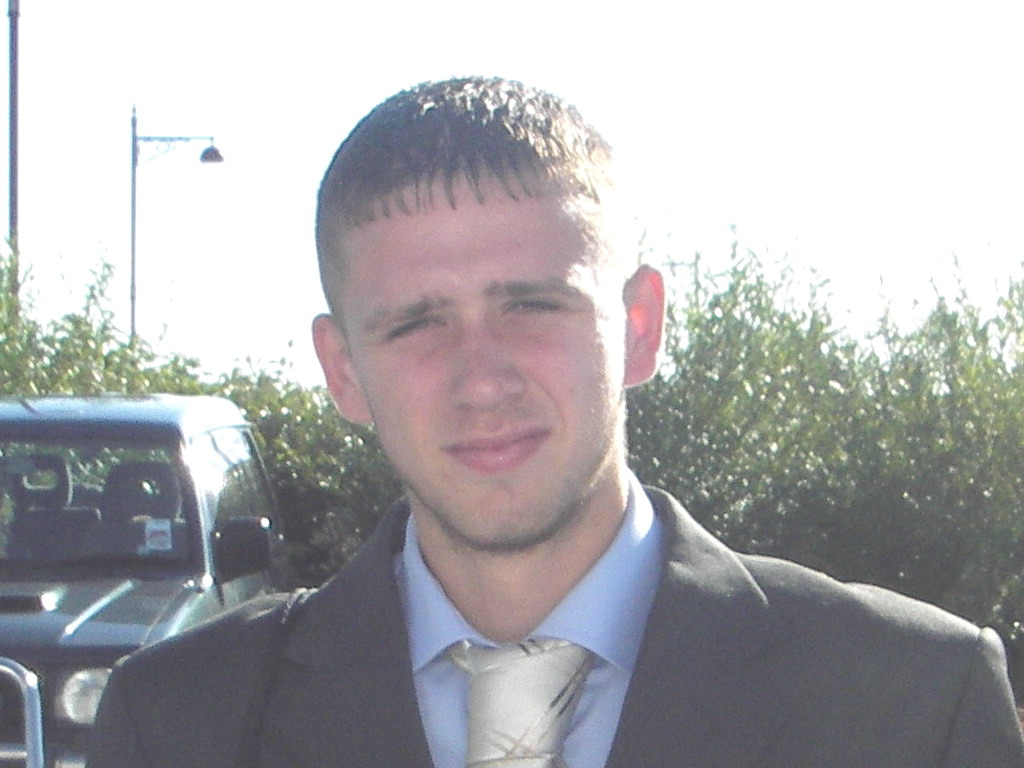

Personal information
- Full name: Jason Clive Beardsley
- Date of birth: 12 July 1989 (age 37)
- Place of birth: Uttoxeter, England
- Position: Defender

Youth career
- Uttoxeter Juniors
- 1996–2007: Derby County

Senior career*
Years	Team	Apps	(Gls)
2007–2009	Derby County	0	(0)
2008	→ Notts County (loan)	11	(0)
2010	FC Tampa Bay	0	(0)
2010–2011	Macclesfield Town	0	(0)
2010	→ Eastwood Town (loan)	2	(0)
2011	Mickleover Sports		
2011	Stafford Rangers	0	(0)
2011–2012	Lincoln City	1	(0)
2012–2013	Uttoxeter Town		
2013	Eastwood Town		
2013	Worcester City	2	(0)
Total		16+	(0+)
- * Club domestic league appearances and goals

Jason Clive Beardsley (born 12 July 1989) is an English former footballer who played in the Football League for Notts County.

== Career ==
=== Early career ===
Beardsley was born in Uttoxeter, and started playing football for Uttoxeter Juniors where his father, Clive, was manager. He was approached by many clubs and chose to play for the club he supported as a boy, Derby County, and was signed up at just seven years old. He attended Windsor Park middle school before going onto Thomas Alleyne's High School in Uttoxeter.

=== Derby County ===
Beardsley made his first team debut in a League Cup second round match against Blackpool. He was booked, and was replaced in the 61st minute with Andy Todd taking his place. The match finished 2–2 after extra time, with Blackpool winning 7–6 on a penalty shootout. He began 2008–09 pre-season training with League Two team Port Vale with the hope of securing a loan move for the early part of the season to gain first team experience, but eventually joined Notts County instead on 5 July 2008 on an initial three-month deal, subsequently extended until the end of 2008. He returned to Derby County on New Years Day 2009, after appearing in 11 league games for The Magpies, and made his second appearance for Derby two days later in an FA Cup tie against Forest Green Rovers.

In April 2009, he agreed a new two-year deal with Derby, having impressed new manager Nigel Clough, but was unhappy at the club due to not being part of the first team picture and left the club by mutual consent on 29 September 2009. He went on trial with Nottingham Forest, with the opportunity to link up with former Derby County manager Billy Davies, but eventually was not signed by the club.

=== Tampa Bay ===
On 28 January 2010, Beardsley was signed by the FC Tampa Bay of the new USSF Division 2 in the USA. However, he was released from his contract a few weeks later after becoming homesick.

=== Post Tampa Bay ===
When Paul Dickov was appointed Oldham Athletic manager he offered Beardsley a trial at Boundary Park but, after training with the squad and playing a friendly for the club, he was told that he would not be signed by the Latics.

=== Macclesfield Town ===
On 31 July 2010, Beardsley signed for Macclesfield Town on a one-year contract after a successful trial period. On 26 October it was announced that he had joined Eastwood Town on loan for a month.

He was released from the Silkmen at the end of the 2010–11 season. In June 2011 he had a short, unsuccessful trial with Scottish Premier League side Aberdeen.

=== 2011–12 season ===
In August 2011 he joined Mickleover Sports, debuting as a 66th-minute substitute in their 3–1 Northern Premier League Premier Division victory over Nantwich Town on 13 August 2011. He departed the club to trial unsuccessfully for a full-time deal with a club in the Netherlands before joining Stafford Rangers on a non-contract basis. Having been an unused substitute in the club's 2–2 draw at Worksop Town on 29 October 2011, he was handed his debut in the club's 2–0 Staffordshire Senior Cup defeat at Leek Town three days later but that proved to be his final appearance for the club as he was released after just two weeks at Marston Road. On 9 December 2011, Beardsley joined Conference National side Lincoln City on a non-contract basis; he had previously trialled with the club in their 2–0 friendly victory at Barton Town Old Boys on 19 July 2011. He made a single appearance for the club, as a 60th-minute substitute for Josh Gowling in the 2–1 Football Conference home defeat to Grimsby Town on 26 December 2011, before his registration was cancelled by the club on 6 January 2012.

=== 2012–13 season ===
In August 2012, he joined hometown team Uttoxeter Town for their Staffordshire County Senior League Division One campaign. He debuted for the club in their 2–1 home league victory over Hilton Harriers on 22 August 2012 and went on to make 21 appearances for the club, scoring two goals.

In March 2013 he rejoined Eastwood Town, but was quickly on the move again linking up with Worcester City the following week. He debuted for the club, as a substitute, in their 1–0 Football Conference North defeat at Corby Town on 30 March 2013 and made a further substitute appearance for them before leaving at the end of the season.
