= Paris Simmons =

English footballer (born 1990)

Personal information
- Full name: Paris Michael Simmons
- Date of birth: 2 January 1990 (age 36)
- Place of birth: Lewisham, England
- Height: 5 ft 10 in (1.78 m)
- Position: Forward

Youth career
- ?–2008: Derby County

Senior career*
Years	Team	Apps	(Gls)
2008–2009	Derby County	1	(0)
2008	→ Burton Albion (loan)	2	(0)
2009	→ Lincoln City (loan)	0	(0)
2009	Eastwood Town	2	(0)
2009–2010	Carlton Town	21	(3)
2011–2012	New Orleans Jesters	12	(7)
Total		38	(10)
- * Club domestic league appearances and goals

Paris Michael Simmons (born 2 January 1990) is an English former footballer.

== Sporting career ==
Simmons made his club debut on 11 May 2008, the final day of the season, in a Premier League game, for Derby County against Reading as a substitute. He had the ball in the net within seconds of getting on the pitch but the whistle had already been blown for a foul by Darren Moore.

Simmons first team chances were restricted by Paul Jewell's squad reconstruction following relegation from the Premier League and, on 30 October 2008, he joined non-league Burton Albion on a month's loan. but returned without scoring a goal for the Brewers. He went out on loan again to League Two Lincoln City on 11 March 2009 in one-month deal. It was announced in May 2009 that he would not be offered a new deal by Derby at the end of his contract.

After joining Wolverhampton Wanderers on trial he signed for Conference North team Eastwood Town. In October he left Eastwood Town and, after spending time on trial with Polish club Śląsk Wrocław, joined Carlton Town.

Simmons moved to the United States in 2011 when he signed with the New Orleans Jesters in the USL Premier Development League. He made his debut for the Jesters in their first game of the 2011 season, a 3–1 loss to the El Paso Patriots, and scored his first goal on 21 May, in a 2–0 win over the West Texas United Sockers. He retired from professional football in 2013.
