= Claude Davis =

Jamaican footballer (born 1979)

- Davis playing for Sheffield United in 2006

Personal information
- Full name: Claude Davis
- Date of birth: 6 March 1979 (age 47)
- Place of birth: Kingston, Jamaica
- Height: 6 ft 4 in (1.93 m)
- Position: Defender

Senior career*
Years	Team	Apps	(Gls)
2000–2003	Hazard United		
2003–2006	Preston North End	94	(4)
2006–2007	Sheffield United	21	(0)
2007–2009	Derby County	27	(0)
2009	→ Crystal Palace (loan)	7	(0)
2009–2011	Crystal Palace	45	(0)
2011–2013	Crawley Town	45	(3)
2013–2014	Rotherham United	31	(2)
Total		270	(9)

International career
2000–2012	Jamaica	69	(2)
- * Club domestic league appearances and goals

Claude Davis (born 6 March 1979) is a Jamaican former footballer who played as a defender. He previously played for Hazard United, Preston North End, Sheffield United, Derby County, Crystal Palace, Crawley Town and Rotherham United. He has also played international football for Jamaica.

== Playing career ==
=== Club career ===
==== Hazard United ====
Born in Kingston, Jamaica, Davis captained Hazard United, now known as Portmore United, to the Jamaica National Premier League title in 2002–03. He left Hazard on a year loan deal with Preston North End in the summer of 2003.

==== Preston North End ====
He signed for Preston North End from Hazard United in July 2003, initially on loan for the 2003–04 season before concluding a permanent deal at Deepdale in March 2004. During the 2004–05 season he provided Chris Lucketti and Youl Mawene with real competition for centre half positions and made 38 appearances for Preston, including the Championship play-off final where Preston lost to West Ham. In the 2005–06 season, Davis established himself as the mainstay of the Preston defence, contributing to 24 clean sheets and swept the board at the club's Player of the Season awards, named both the Player's Player and fans Player of the Season, as Preston reached the play-offs again.

==== Sheffield United ====
On 14 June 2006, he signed on a four-year deal with Sheffield United for a club record £3 million, with up to £500,000 to follow based on his appearances for the Blades. However, he missed the start of the Premier League season after sustaining a knee cartilage injury in a friendly against Notts County in August 2006 at Meadow Lane. In total he made 22 league and cup appearances for Sheffield United.

==== Derby County ====
On 6 July 2007, newly promoted Derby County agreed a £3 million transfer for Davis with Sheffield United, subject to a medical and work permit, signed a four-year contract on the same day. Davis was not officially registered as a Derby County player until 25 July 2007, after a delay with his work permit.

==== Crystal Palace ====
Davis reunited with former Sheffield United boss Neil Warnock, in 2009, by signing a loan deal to play for Crystal Palace. He played an instrumental part in helping the team avoid relegation.

Davis was expected to move to Palace on a permanent basis, but the Football League placed a transfer embargo onto the club due to unpaid bonuses to former players, and Davis remained a Derby player until the end of August (when the embargo was lifted), joining the Eagles on a two-year contract on the final day of the transfer window. During this season he played a major part in helping the team to the fifth round of the FA cup.

==== Crawley Town ====
After joining League Two side Crawley Town on 15 September 2011 he led the club on a 13-game unbeaten streak and played a major part in their promotional campaign. He was also the first international player to ever represent the club, captaining the Jamaica National team against New Zealand during the international break this same season. He continued to show his leadership off the pitch with his community involvement by agreeing to be the teams ambassador to their junior program.

==== Rotherham United ====
On Monday 21 January 2013, Davis signed for promotion chasing Rotherham United on an 18-month contract to link up with his former Crawley manager, Steve Evans and the chance to play at the New York Stadium. After a nightmare debut his place in the team was solidified and he helped the Millers to back to back promotion from League 2 to League 1 and then League 1 to Championship. At the end of the 2014 campaign Davis' contract with Rotherham was not renewed after they won the League One Play-Offs against Leyton Orient despite several meetings with manager and the board.

=== International career ===
Davis has made 68 international appearances for Jamaica, scoring two goals and captaining the team on several occasions.

== Media personality ==
Davis was an analyst for Jamaican station CVM during the World Cup 2010 as well as World Cup 2014 alongside Michael Hall, Simon Preston, Andre Virtue and Roy Simpson

== Honours ==
Hazard United

- Jamaica National Premier League: 2002–03

Crawley Town

- Football League Two second-place promotion: 2011–12

Rotherham United

- Football League One play-offs: 2014
- Football League Two second-place promotion: 2012–13

Individual

- Preston North End Players' Player of the Season: 2005–06
- Preston North End Supporters' Player of the Season: 2005–06
