= 2006 Football League Championship play-off final =

Association football match in Cardiff, UK

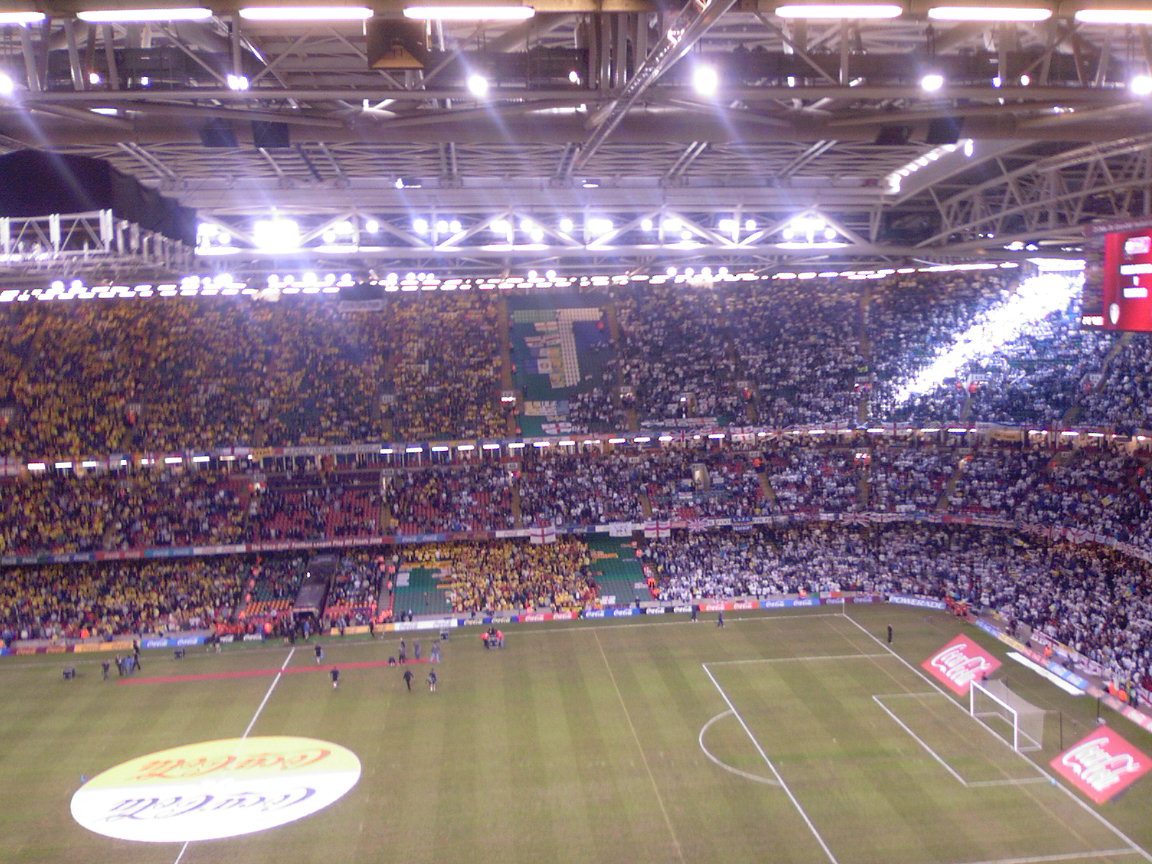
Leeds United	Watford
0	3
- Date: 21 May 2006
- Venue: Millennium Stadium, Cardiff
- Man of the Match: Jay DeMerit
- Referee: Mike Dean (Cheshire)
- Attendance: 64,736
- Weather: Heavy rain

The 2006 Football League Championship play-off final was an association football match which was played on 21 May 2006 at the Millennium Stadium in Cardiff, Wales, between Leeds United and Watford. The match was to determine the third and final team to gain promotion from the Football League Championship, the second tier of English football, to the FA Premiership, the top tier. Reading and Sheffield United, the top two teams of the 2005–06 Football League Championship season, gained automatic promotion to the Premiership, while the clubs placed from third to sixth place in the table took part in play-off semi-finals. Third-placed Watford defeated sixth-placed Crystal Palace in the first semi-final, while fifth-placed Leeds United beat fourth-placed Preston North End. The winners of these semi-finals competed for the final place for the 2006–07 season in the Premiership. Winning the final was estimated to be worth up to £40 million to the successful team.

The final was refereed by Mike Dean and was watched by a crowd of 64,736. It was the last play-off final to be held at the Millennium Stadium, as the new Wembley Stadium was completed in time for the 2007 final. Watford won the match 3–0, with opening goalscorer Jay DeMerit named man of the match. Leeds goalkeeper Neil Sullivan scored an own goal to make the score 2–0 to Watford after 60 minutes, and the final goal was a penalty kick scored by Darius Henderson.

The following season, Leeds's manager Kevin Blackwell was sacked in September, with the club second from bottom, and was replaced by Dennis Wise. The club went into administration the following May and were deducted ten points; they finished the season bottom of the league and they were relegated to the third tier of English football for the first time in the club's history. Watford struggled in the Premiership and were relegated back to the Championship after ending the season bottom of the league, ten points below safety.

== Route to the final ==
Football League Championship final table, leading positions
Pos	Team	Pld	W	D	L	GF	GA	GD	Pts
1	Reading	46	31	13	2	99	32	+67	106
2	Sheffield United	46	26	12	8	76	46	+30	90
3	Watford	46	22	15	9	77	53	+24	81
4	Preston North End	46	20	20	6	59	30	+29	80
5	Leeds United	46	21	15	10	57	38	+19	78
6	Crystal Palace	46	21	12	13	67	48	+19	75

Watford finished the regular 2005–06 season in third place in the Football League Championship, the second tier of the English football league system, two places and three points ahead of Leeds United. Both therefore missed out on the two automatic places for promotion to the Premiership and instead took part in the play-offs, along with Preston North End and Crystal Palace, to determine the third promoted team. Watford finished nine points behind Sheffield United (who were promoted in second place) and twenty-five behind league winners Reading.

Leeds had won just one of their final ten league games. Their play-off semi-final opponents were Preston North End with the first leg taking place at Elland Road, Leeds, on 5 May 2006. The match ended 1–1: Preston took the lead with a goal from David Nugent in the 48th minute before Eddie Lewis equalised for Leeds with a free kick in the 74th minute. Billy Davies, the Preston manager, commented after the match: "it is tremendous to come here in front of their biggest crowd of the season and get what is a fantastic result. It is a case of job done." The second leg took place three days later at Deepdale, Preston's home ground. After a goalless first half, a header from Rob Hulse and a low strike from Frazer Richardson saw Leeds secure a 2–0 win on the day and a 3–1 aggregate victory. Leeds were reduced to nine men when both Stephen Crainey and Richard Cresswell were sent off in the second half, with six of their team-mates also shown a yellow card.

Watford's opposition for their play-off semi-final was Crystal Palace, with the first leg held at Selhurst Park on 6 May 2006. After a goalless first half, a strike from Marlon King one minute into the second half opened the scoring for Watford. Ben Foster, on loan from Manchester United, made a fingertip save to deny a header from Crystal Palace's Tony Popovic, before a curling free kick from Ashley Young made it 2–0. Five minutes from full time, Matthew Spring scored to give Watford a 3–0 win. The second leg at Watford's Vicarage Road took place three days later. The home side's manager Aidy Boothroyd was sent to the stand after an altercation with Fitz Hall which resulted in a mass brawl on the pitch. The match finished 0–0, giving Watford a 3–0 aggregate victory and a place in the final.

Watford			Round	Leeds
Opponent	Result	Legs	Semi-finals	Opponent	Result	Legs
Crystal Palace	3–0	3–0 away; 0–0 home		Preston North End	3–1	1–1 home; 2–0 away

== Match ==
=== Background ===
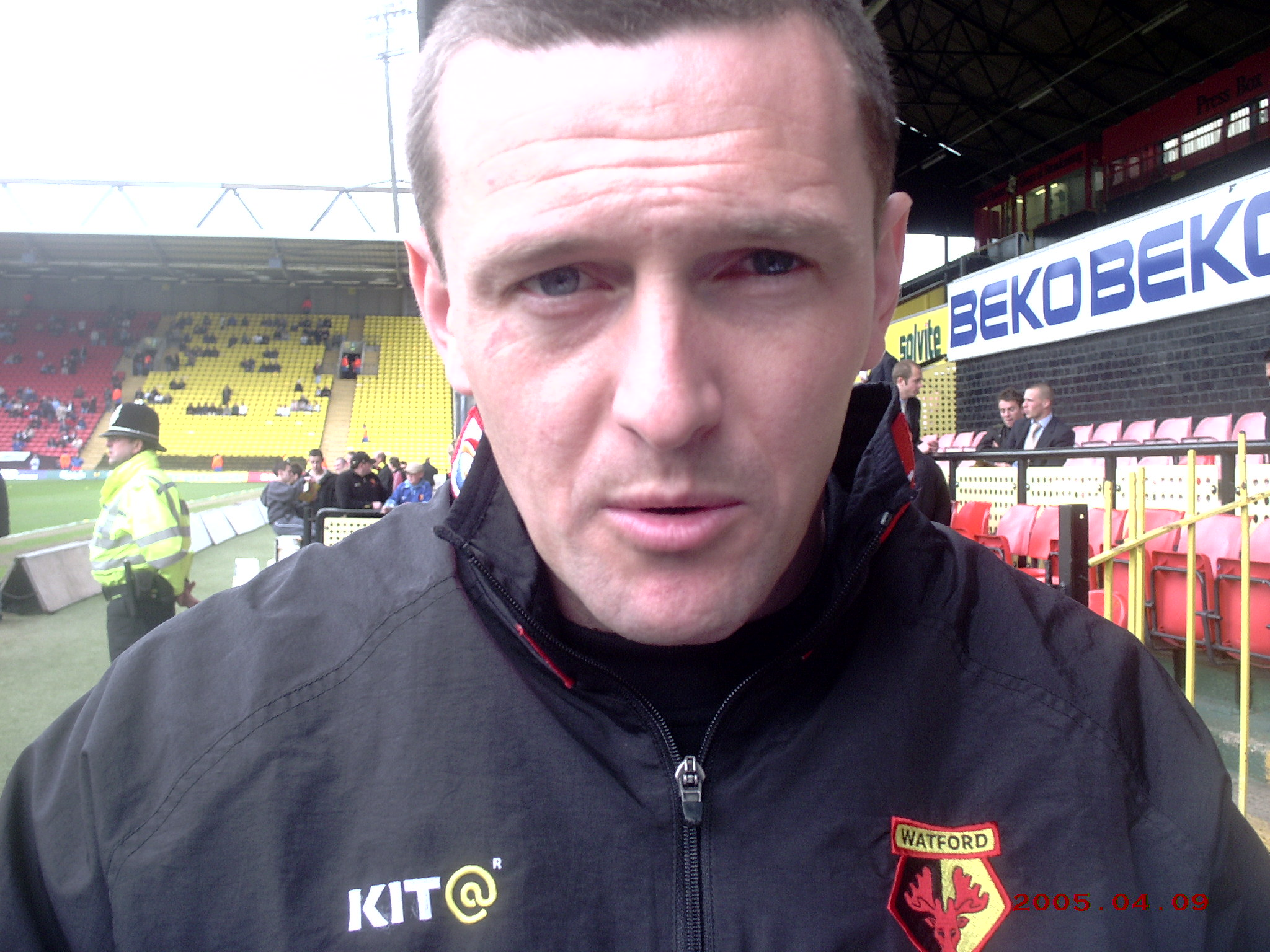
Aidy Boothroyd (pictured in 2005) had left Leeds United to manage Watford.

Leeds United were making their second play-off final appearance: they had lost 2–1 in a replay of the 1987 final to Charlton Athletic after the two legs ended in an aggregate draw. Watford had also previously participated in one play-off final, having beaten Bolton Wanderers 2–0 at the old Wembley Stadium in the 1999 final. During the regular season, the match between the two teams at Vicarage Road in October 2005 was a goalless draw, while Leeds won the return fixture at Elland Road 2–1 the following February. Watford's King was the Championship's leading scorer with 21 goals; his team-mate Darius Henderson was the second-highest scorer with 15. David Healy and Hulse were the top marksmen for Leeds, with 12 each, followed by Robbie Blake on 11. Leeds United had last played in the top tier of English football in the 2003–04 season, when they were relegated after finishing nineteenth in the league. Watford had played in the Championship since being relegated from the Premiership in the 1999–2000 season. Boothroyd was the first-team coach at Leeds United until he left in March 2005 to take the Watford manager's role. In doing so, at the age of 34, he became the youngest manager in the Football League. His playing career had been ended while he was at Peterborough United when he suffered a broken leg in a tackle by Shaun Derry, then playing for Notts County; for the play-off final, Derry was in the starting line-up for Leeds. Boothroyd had been promoted from academy football by the Leeds manager Kevin Blackwell, who himself had experienced failure in the play-off final three years earlier. Then, he was assistant to Neil Warnock whose Sheffield United team lost 3–0 to Wolverhampton Wanderers.

The referee for the match was Mike Dean who was representing the Cheshire Football Association. He had been selected to referee the 2006 FA Cup Final between Liverpool and West Ham United, but was later replaced as he lived in the Wirral. While the Football Association were adamant that they had "complete faith in Dean's refereeing ability, integrity and impartiality", they felt his connection to the Wirral "might lead to comment and debate which could place him under undue additional pressure". It was the last play-off final to be held at the Millennium Stadium, as the new Wembley Stadium was completed in time for the 2007 final. The pitch was in a poor condition following rugby union's Heineken Cup Final which had been hosted at the stadium the previous day. Winning the play-off final was estimated to be worth up to £40 million to the successful team. The chief executive of Watford, Mark Ashton, did not underestimate the impact of promotion: "In my opinion it surpasses the riches of the Champions League – it is the richest football game on the planet".

Both Crainey and Cresswell were unavailable for Leeds as they were suspended following their dismissals in the second leg of the semi-final. Paul Butler returned from injury and was included in Leeds's starting eleven, along with Hulse and Healy; Blake was named amongst the substitutes. Watford's Clarke Carlisle was out with a hip injury, and Henderson was selected in place of Al Bangura. The match was broadcast in the UK on Sky Sports 1. Watford adopted a 4–4–2 formation, while Leeds played 4–5–1 with Hulse playing as the lone striker. Watford were considered narrow favourites to win the match by bookmakers. Both teams wore black armbands in memory of Queens Park Rangers youth player Kiyan Prince, who was stabbed to death outside his school four days before the match.

=== Summary ===
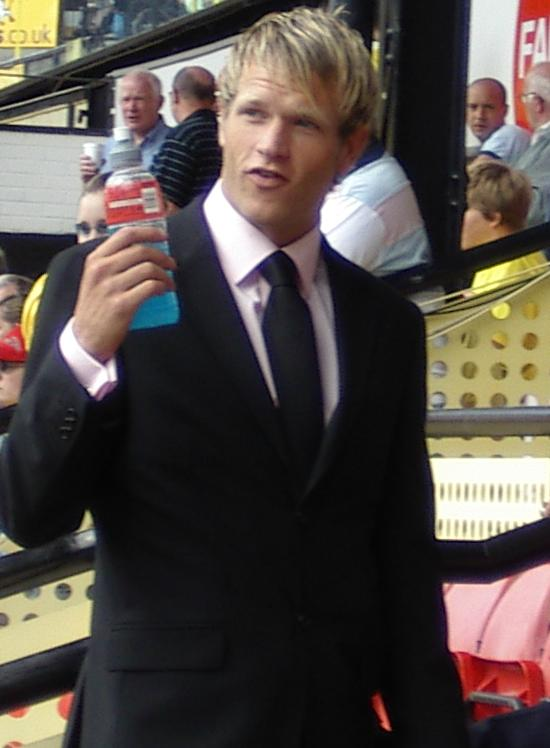
Jay DeMerit (pictured in 2005) opened the scoring for Watford.

The match kicked off around 3 p.m. on 21 May 2006 in front of a Millennium Stadium crowd of 64,736 under a closed roof because of rainy conditions. Two minutes in, Henderson's header from a Watford corner was weak, and was deflected off Butler. On eight minutes, the Watford goalkeeper Foster failed to catch a long Leeds throw-in allowing a Derry shot, but Lloyd Doyley diverted the strike wide. In the 14th minute, Young's shot from 20 yards (18 m) from a King pass went wide of the Leeds goalpost. Eleven minutes later, Watford took the lead through Jay DeMerit. Losing his marker Hulse, DeMerit scored with a 5-yard (4.6 m) header from Young's corner. It was the American defender's third goal of his first season in English football after failing to be drafted into Major League Soccer. Leeds had a penalty claim just before half-time, when Foster appeared to foul Hulse, but it was rejected by Dean. Soon after, from a diagonal free kick, Sean Gregan's header at the far post went outside the Watford post. In stoppage time, a Leeds free kick from a central position 35 yards (32 m) out was struck high by Eddie Lewis, and the first half ended 1–0 to Watford.

At half-time, Leeds made their first substitution of the match with Blake coming on for Richardson; Watford made no changes. Henderson's half-volley was saved by Neil Sullivan before an own goal from the Leeds goalkeeper made it 2–0 to Watford in the 57th minute: James Chambers, who received a long throw-in, turned and shot; the ball was deflected off Lewis, hit the Leeds post and went in off Sullivan. Eight minutes later, Healy's strike was kept out by Foster, and in the 70th minute Derry's header from a corner was cleared off the goal line by Watford's Chambers. From the resulting corner, a 20-yard (18 m) shot from Lewis was saved by Foster. Five minutes later, King's free kick went over the crossbar before an injury to one of the assistant referees meant the fourth official Chris Foy was required to replace him. Lewis then cleared a Malky Mackay header off the line before Watford made it 3–0 in the 84th minute. Spring made a run forward and passed to King who was fouled by Derry; the resulting penalty was converted by Henderson. No further goals were scored, and the match ended 3–0 with Watford returning to the top tier of English football for the first time since 2000.

=== Details ===
21 May 2006
15:00 BST

Leeds United	0–3	Watford
	Report	DeMerit 25'; Sullivan 57' (o.g.); Henderson 84' (pen.)

Millennium Stadium, Cardiff
Attendance: 64,736
Referee: Mike Dean (Cheshire)

Leeds United	Watford

GK	1	(Scotland) Neil Sullivan
RB	2	(Republic of Ireland) Gary Kelly
CB	6	(Republic of Ireland) Paul Butler (c)
CB	8	(England) Sean Gregan	Yellow card	(substituted off) 84'
LB	26	(England) Matthew Kilgallon
RM	15	(England) Frazer Richardson		(substituted off) 45'
CM	20	(Republic of Ireland) Jonathan Douglas
CM	21	(England) Shaun Derry	Yellow card
CM	17	(Republic of Ireland) Liam Miller	Yellow card	(substituted off) 62'
LM	11	(United States) Eddie Lewis
CF	10	(England) Rob Hulse
Substitutes:
GK	13	(England) Ian Bennett
MF	14	(England) Steve Stone
MF	19	(Norway) Eirik Bakke		(substituted on) 84'
FW	28	(England) Robbie Blake		(substituted on) 45'
FW	9	(Northern Ireland) David Healy		(substituted on) 62'
Manager:
(England) Kevin Blackwell

GK	26	(England) Ben Foster
RB	12	(England) Lloyd Doyley	Yellow card
CB	4	(Scotland) Malky Mackay
CB	6	(United States) Jay DeMerit
LB	3	(England) Jordan Stewart
RM	2	(England) James Chambers		(substituted off) 72'
CM	25	(England) Matthew Spring	Yellow card
CM	8	(England) Gavin Mahon (c)	Yellow card
LM	15	(England) Ashley Young
CF	9	(Jamaica) Marlon King
CF	29	(England) Darius Henderson
Substitutes:
GK	1	(England) Alec Chamberlain
DF	23	(England) Adrian Mariappa
MF	7	(England) Chris Eagles
MF	20	(Sierra Leone) Al Bangura		(substituted on) 72'
FW	18	(Algeria) Hamer Bouazza
Manager:
(England) Aidy Boothroyd

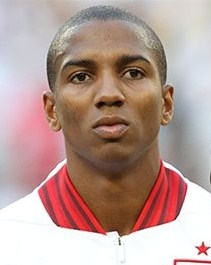
Ashley Young was among Watford's scorers in the semi-final first leg.

Statistics
	Leeds United	Watford
Goals scored	0	3
Shots on target	6	7
Shots off target	6	4
Ball possession	44%	56%
Corner kicks	8	9
Fouls committed	18	14
Offsides	2	3
Yellow cards	3	3
Red cards	0	0

== Post-match ==
Boothroyd, who was to become the youngest manager in the Premiership, was circumspect: "This is just the end of the beginning ... We will start as relegation favourites next season, like this season." He was confident that his club could maintain their top-flight status the following season however, saying: "We won't go down ... I think the best way to sum this up is that I think we are now a model for other clubs that don't have a great deal of money. But with good organisation, preparation and a fantastic work ethic ... We will take that ethic with us into the Premiership and we won't go down." Boothroyd also paid his respects to his former club: "I have a great deal of sympathy for Leeds and Kevin Blackwell ... They're a massive club and I'm sure they will bounce back." The Watford chairman Graham Simpson opined: "That was the most tortuous 90 minutes I've ever endured. You cannot enjoy it, until afterwards anyway." Blackwell was downcast but equitable in defeat: "It's a terrible place to come and lose and feel as though you've achieved nothing ... We lacked a spark and were second to the ball all over the park. We deserved to lose." He added: "We're very disappointed – although not as disappointed as when we dropped out of the Premiership and lost all our players." Hulse was defiant: "Right now I am gutted ... We will take a break, refocus for next season and come back stronger." Watford's former manager Graham Taylor suggested the match was "by no means a classic" and urged the club to maintain "the spirit that has been fostered throughout this season". Rick Broadbent, writing for the Irish Independent, proposed that Leeds "never gave it a go at Cardiff, fading with a whimper".

DeMerit was named man of the match. The BBC described the match as "a frantic play-off final". Stuart James, writing in The Guardian, suggested that "Leeds were crushed" and that they had failed to deal with Watford's "high-tempo approach" nor with their threat from set pieces. Eurosport observed that Watford had switched from their "normally attractive footballing principles to use the long ball into the channels" as a direct result of the condition of the playing surface at the Millennium Stadium. Louise Taylor, writing in The Guardian, concurred: "the ball repeatedly flew high through the air, conveniently bypassing midfield before crashing towards the corners, as long throws were launched into the 'mixer' and three goals were scored from set pieces." Derry had not seen the footage of the game for a decade when, in 2016, he commented on his foul to concede the late penalty: "That was a desperate footballer making a desperate lunge on a desperate day ... There’s no other way to describe it" and described the loss as the "lowest point of my career".

The following season, Blackwell was sacked by Leeds on 20 September 2006, with the club second from bottom. He was eventually replaced more than a month later by Dennis Wise and assistant manager Gus Poyet, who were incumbent at Swindon Town. The following May, Leeds went into administration via a company voluntary arrangement and were deducted ten points. This ensured the club finished the season bottom of the 2006–07 Football League Championship and they were relegated to the third tier of English football for the first time in the club's history. Watford's next season saw them struggle in the Premiership, and they were relegated back to the Championship on 21 April 2007. They ended the season bottom of the league, ten points below safety.

== Sources ==
- Chapman, Daniel (2019). 100 Years of Leeds United. Icon Books Limited. ISBN 978-178578-430-9.
