= 2005–06 Leeds United A.F.C. season =

2005–06 season of Leeds United

Leeds United
2005–06 season
- Chairman: Ken Bates
- Manager: Kevin Blackwell
- Stadium: Elland Road
- Championship: 5th (qualified for play-offs)
- Play-offs: Runners-up
- FA Cup: Third round
- League Cup: Third round
- Top goalscorer: League: Rob Hulse (13); All: Rob Hulse (14)
- Highest home attendance: 27,843 vs Sheffield Wednesday (21 January 2006, Championship)
- Lowest home attendance: 14,970 vs Oldham Athletic (23 August 2005, League Cup)
- Average home league attendance: 22,355

The 2005–06 season saw Leeds United competing in the Championship (known as the Coca-Cola Championship for sponsorship reasons) for a second successive season.

== Competitions ==
=== Championship ===
==== League table ====
Pos	Team	Pld	W	D	L	GF	GA	GD	Pts	Promotion, qualification or relegation
3	Watford (O, P)	46	22	15	9	77	53	+24	81	Qualification for Championship play-offs
4	Preston North End	46	20	20	6	59	30	+29	80	Qualification for Championship play-offs
5	Leeds United	46	21	15	10	57	38	+19	78	Qualification for Championship play-offs
6	Crystal Palace	46	21	12	13	67	48	+19	75	Qualification for Championship play-offs
7	Wolverhampton Wanderers	46	16	19	11	50	42	+8	67	

Updated to match(es) played on 2 December 2011. Source: RSSSF
Rules for classification: 1) points; 2) goal difference; 3) number of goals scored.
(O) Play-off winners; (P) Promoted

==== Results summary ====
Overall								Home						Away					
Pld	W	D	L	GF	GA	GD	Pts	W	D	L	GF	GA	GD	W	D	L	GF	GA	GD
46	21	15	10	57	38	+19	78	13	7	3	35	18	+17	8	8	7	22	20	+2

Source: Statto

==== Results by round ====
Round	1	2	3	4	5	6	7	8	9	10	11	12	13	14	15	16	17	18	19	20	21	22	23	24	25	26	27	28	29	30	31	32	33	34	35	36	37	38	39	40	41	42	43	44	45	46
Ground	H	A	A	H	A	H	A	A	H	H	A	A	H	H	A	A	H	A	H	A	H	H	A	H	A	H	A	A	H	A	H	A	H	A	H	A	H	A	H	H	A	H	H	A	H	A
Result	W	L	D	W	W	D	L	W	L	W	D	W	W	D	D	L	D	W	W	W	W	L	L	W	W	W	W	L	W	D	W	D	W	D	W	W	D	D	L	D	L	D	D	D	W	L
Position	2	9	9	5	4	7	10	6	9	6	6	4	4	4	5	5	5	4	4	4	3	4	4	4	3	3	3	3	3	3	3	4	3	4	4	3	3	3	4	4	4	3	4	5	4	5

Source: Statto.com
A = Away; H = Home; W = Win; D = Draw; L = Loss

=== Championship ===
Date	Opponent	Venue	Result F–A	Scorers	Attendance	Referee	Ref.
7 August 2005	Millwall	Home	2–1	Healy 28', 73' pen.	20,440	Laws	
9 August 2005	Cardiff City	Away	1–2	Blake 22'	15,231	Tanner	
13 August 2005	Luton Town	Away	0–0		10,102	Leake	
20 August 2005	Wolverhampton Wanderers	Home	2–0	Lewis 8', Hulse 60'	21,229	Beeby	
27 August 2005	Norwich City	Away	1–0	Hulse 67'	25,015	Rennie	
10 September 2005	Brighton & Hove Albion	Home	3–3	Healy 65', 70', Douglas 90'	21,212	Pike	
13 September 2005	Sheffield Wednesday	Away	0–1		29,986	Taylor	
17 September 2005	Queens Park Rangers	Away	1–0	Hulse 41'	15,523	Walton	
24 September 2005	Ipswich Town	Home	0–2		21,676	Halsey	
28 September 2005	Derby County	Home	3–1	Hulse 32', 37', 44'	18,353	Salisbury	
1 October 2005	Watford	Away	0–0		16,050	Curson	
15 October 2005	Burnley	Away	2–1	Lewis 71', Hulse 75'	16,174	Dean	
18 October 2005	Southampton	Home	2–1	Hulse 11', Blake 19'	18,881	Jones	
21 October 2005	Sheffield United	Home	1–1	Richardson 53'	23,600	Wiley	
29 October 2005	Reading	Away	1–1	Walton 1'	22,012	Olivier	
1 November 2005	Crewe Alexandra	Away	0–1		7,220	Kettle	
5 November 2005	Preston North End	Home	0–0		22,289	D'Urso	
19 November 2005	Southampton	Away	4–3	Butler 71', Blake 77', Healy 84' pen., Miller 86'	30,173	Williamson	
22 November 2005	Burnley	Home	2–0	Healy 55' pen., Blake 70'	21,318	Bates	
26 November 2005	Millwall	Away	1–0	May 90' o.g.	8,134	Fletcher	
3 December 2005	Leicester City	Home	2–1	Healy 41', Kilgallon 73'	21,402	Dean	
10 December 2005	Cardiff City	Home	0–1		20,597	Salisbury	
17 December 2005	Wolverhampton Wanderers	Away	0–1		26,821	Foy	
26 December 2005	Coventry City	Home	3–1	Douglas 34', Blake 61', Cresswell 80'	24,291	Webster	
28 December 2005	Stoke City	Away	1–0	Lewis 69'	20,408	Halsey	
31 December 2005	Hull City	Home	2–0	Douglas 45', 57'	26,387	Hall	
2 January 2006	Plymouth Argyle	Away	3–0	Cresswell 53', Blake 60', Hulse 86' pen.	17,726	Taylor	
14 January 2006	Brighton & Hove Albion	Away	1–2	Blake 38' pen.	7,415	D'Urso	
21 January 2006	Sheffield Wednesday	Home	3–0	Butler 70', Cresswell 82', 90'	27,843	Gallagher	
31 January 2006	Ipswich Town	Away	1–1	Healy 88' pen.	25,845	Crossley	
4 February 2006	Queens Park Rangers	Home	2–0	Cresswell 39', Butler 84'	21,807	Walton	
11 February 2006	Derby County	Away	0–0		27,000	Dowd	
14 February 2006	Watford	Home	2–1	Blake 60' pen., 81'	22,007	Jones	
18 February 2006	Leicester City	Away	1–1	Blake 12' pen.	25,497	Olivier	
25 February 2006	Luton Town	Home	2–1	Douglas 49', Lewis 53'	23,644	Hill	
4 March 2006	Crystal Palace	Away	2–1	Blake 33', Hulse 53'	23,843	Gallagher	
11 March 2006	Norwich City	Home	2–2	Hulse 20', Lewis 90'	24,993	Foy	
18 March 2006	Coventry City	Away	1–1	Healy 88' pen.	26,643	Oliver	
21 March 2006	Crystal Palace	Home	0–1		24,507	Joslin	
25 March 2006	Stoke City	Home	0–0		21,452	Stroud	
1 April 2006	Hull City	Away	0–1		23,486	Ilderton	
8 April 2006	Plymouth Argyle	Home	0–0		20,650	Thorpe	
15 April 2006	Reading	Home	1–1	Hulse 47'	24,535	Halsey	
18 April 2006	Sheffield United	Away	1–1	Healy 42'	29,329	Poll	
22 April 2006	Crewe Alexandra	Home	1–0	Healy 74'	21,046	Miller	
30 April 2006	Preston North End	Away	0–2		19,350	Rennie	

==== Play-offs ====
Round	Date	Opponent	Venue	Result F–A	Scorers	Attendance	Referee	Ref.
Semi-Final First Leg	5 May 2006	Preston North End	Home	1–1	Lewis 74'	35,239	Crossley	
Semi-Final Second Leg	8 May 2006	Preston North End	Away	2–0	Hulse 56', Richardson 61'	20,283	Thorpe	
Final	21 May 2006	Watford	Neutral	0–3		64,736	Dean	

=== FA Cup ===
Round	Date	Opponent	Venue	Result F–A	Scorers	Attendance	Referee	Ref.
Third Round	7 January 2006	Wigan Athletic	Away	1–1	Hulse 88'	10,980	Poll	
Third Round Replay	17 January 2006	Wigan Athletic	Home	3–3 (2–4 p)	Healy 41', 64' pen., Kelly 116'	15,243	Poll	

=== League Cup ===
Round	Date	Opponent	Venue	Result F–A	Scorers	Attendance	Referee	Ref.
First Round	23 August 2005	Oldham Athletic	Home	2–0	Ricketts 20', Richardson 24'	14,970	Wright	
Second Round	20 September 2005	Rotherham United	Away	2–0	Cresswell 19', 28'	5,445	Leake	
Third Round	25 October 2005	Blackburn Rovers	Away	0–3		15,631	Foy	

== Statistics ==
No.	Pos.	Name	League		Play-offs		FA Cup		League Cup		Total		Discipline	
No.	Pos.	Name	Apps	Goals	Apps	Goals	Apps	Goals	Apps	Goals	Apps	Goals	Yellow card	Red card
1	GK	(Scotland) Neil Sullivan	42	0	3	0	2	0	3	0	50	0	1	0
2	DF	(Republic of Ireland) Gary Kelly	44	0	3	0	2	1	0	0	49	1	10	0
3	DF	(Scotland) Stephen Crainey	24	0	2	0	2	0	2	0	30	0	2	1
6	DF	(Republic of Ireland) Paul Butler	44	3	1	0	2	0	1	0	48	3	7	0
7	MF	(England) Jermaine Wright	3	0	0	0	0	0	0	0	3	0	0	0
8	MF	(England) Sean Gregan	28	0	3	0	0	0	3	0	34	0	14	0
9	FW	(Northern Ireland) David Healy	24+18	12	1+1	0	1+1	2	2	0	28+20	13	6	1
10	FW	(England) Rob Hulse	32+7	12	3	1	2	1	1+1	0	38+8	14	5	0
11	MF	(United States) Eddie Lewis	42+1	5	3	1	2	0	0+1	0	47+2	6	4	0
12	DF	(England) Danny Pugh	1+11	0	0	0	0	0	3	0	4+11	0	0	0
13	GK	(England) Ian Bennett	4	0	0	0	0	0	0	0	4	0	0	0
14	MF	(England) Steve Stone	1+1	0	0+2	0	0	0	0	0	1+3	0	0	0
15	DF	(England) Frazer Richardson	13+10	1	2	1	0	0	3	1	18+10	3	0	0
16	MF	(Iceland) Gylfi Einarsson	6+4	0	0	0	0+1	0	3	0	9+5	0	2	1
17	MF	(Republic of Ireland) Liam Miller	26+2	1	3	0	2	0	0	0	31+2	1	9	0
18	MF	(England) Simon Walton	3+1	0	0	0	1	0	0	0	4+1	0	2	1
19	MF	(Norway) Eirik Bakke	7+3	0	1+1	0	0	0	0	0	8+4	0	1	0
20	MF	(Republic of Ireland) Jonathan Douglas	32+8	5	2	0	2	0	2+1	0	38+9	5	7	0
21	DF	(England) Shaun Derry	41	0	3	0	1	0	0+1	0	45+1	0	12	0
22	MF	(England) Ian Thomas-Moore	2+18	0	0	0	0	0	2	0	4+18	0	1	0
23	DF	(England) Dan Harding	20	0	0	0	0	0	1	0	21	0	2	0
24	DF	(Angola) Rui Marques	0	0	0	0	0	0	1	0	1	0	0	0
25	FW	(England) Richard Cresswell	12+4	5	0+2	0	0+2	0	1	2	13+8	8	1	0
26	DF	(England) Matthew Kilgallon	22+3	1	3	0	2	0	3	0	30+3	1	4	0
27	FW	(Australia) Joel Griffiths	0+2	0	0	0	0	0	0	0	0+2	0	0	0
28	FW	(England) Robbie Blake	31+10	11	0+2	0	1+1	0	1+1	0	33+14	11	2	0
30	FW	(England) Michael Ricketts	1+3	0	0	0	0	0	1	1	2+3	1	0	0
32	FW	(England) Jermaine Beckford	0+5	0	0	0	0	0	0	0	0+5	0	0	0
34	FW	(England) Danny Graham	1+2	0	0	0	0	0	0	0	1+2	0	0	0

== Transfers ==
=== In ===
Date	Pos.	Name	From	Fee	Ref.
9 May 2005	FW	(England) Rob Hulse	(England) West Bromwich Albion	£1,100,000	
1 July 2005	DF	(England) Dan Harding	(England) Brighton & Hove Albion	£250,000	
1 July 2005	GK	(England) Ian Bennett	(England) Birmingham City	Free	
1 July 2005	MF	(United States) Eddie Lewis	(England) Preston North End	Free	
1 July 2005	MF	(England) Steve Stone	(England) Portsmouth	Free	
18 July 2005	FW	(England) Robbie Blake	(England) Birmingham City	£800,000	
29 July 2005	DF	(Angola) Rui Marques	(Portugal) Marítimo	Free	
24 August 2005	FW	(England) Richard Cresswell	(England) Preston North End	£1,150,000	
17 January 2006	FW	(Australia) Joel Griffiths	(Switzerland) Neuchâtel Xamax	Free	
15 March 2006	FW	(England) Jermaine Beckford	(England) Wealdstone	Undisclosed	

=== Out ===
Date	Pos.	Name	From	Fee	Ref.
25 June 2005	MF	(England) Simon Johnson	(England) Darlington	Free	
1 July 2005	MF	(England) Aaron Lennon	(England) Tottenham Hotspur	£1,000,000	
5 July 2005	MF	(Scotland) Martin Woods	(England) Sunderland	Free	
5 July 2005	FW	(England) Julian Joachim	(England) Boston United	Free	
5 August 2005	DF	(England) Clarke Carlisle	(England) Watford	£100,000	
17 August 2005	MF	(England) Seth Johnson	(England) Derby County	Free	
19 August 2005	MF	(England) Matthew Spring	(England) Watford	£150,000	
26 January 2006	FW	(Scotland) Kevin Smith	(England) Sunderland	Free	

=== Loan in ===
Date from	Date to	Pos.	Name	From	Ref.
19 August 2005	30 June 2006	MF	(Republic of Ireland) Jonathan Douglas	(England) Blackburn Rovers	
4 November 2005	14 May 2006	MF	(Republic of Ireland) Liam Miller	(England) Manchester United	
23 March 2006	22 April 2006	FW	(England) Danny Graham	(England) Middlesbrough	

=== Loan out ===
Date from	Date to	Pos.	Name	To	Ref.
31 August 2005	18 January 2006	MF	(Norway) Eirik Bakke	(England) Aston Villa	
30 January 2006	30 June 2006	FW	(England) Michael Ricketts	(England) Burnley	
