= 2004–05 Leeds United A.F.C. season =

2004–05 season of Leeds United

Leeds United
2004–05 season
- Chairman: Gerald Krasner (until 21 January); Ken Bates (from 21 January)
- Manager: Kevin Blackwell
- Stadium: Elland Road
- Championship: 14th
- FA Cup: Third round
- League Cup: Third round
- Top goalscorer: League: David Healy (7); All: Brian Deane; David Healy (7 each)
- Highest home attendance: 34,496 vs Plymouth Argyle (28 December 2004, Championship)
- Lowest home attendance: 18,476 vs Swindon Town (21 September 2004, League Cup)
- Average home league attendance: 28,814

The 2004–05 season saw Leeds United competing in the Championship (known as the Coca-Cola Championship for sponsorship reasons) following relegation the previous season.

== Competitions ==
=== Championship ===
==== League table ====
| Pos | Team | Pld | W | D | L | GF | GA | GD | Pts |
|---|---|---|---|---|---|---|---|---|---|
| 12 | Stoke City | 46 | 17 | 10 | 19 | 36 | 38 | −2 | 61 |
| 13 | Burnley | 46 | 15 | 15 | 16 | 38 | 39 | −1 | 60 |
| 14 | Leeds United | 46 | 14 | 18 | 14 | 49 | 52 | −3 | 60 |
| 15 | Leicester City | 46 | 12 | 21 | 13 | 49 | 46 | +3 | 57 |
| 16 | Cardiff City | 46 | 13 | 15 | 18 | 48 | 51 | −3 | 54 |

Updated to match(es) played on 9 December 2011. Source: Football League Tables
Rules for classification: 1) points; 2) goal difference; 3) number of goals scored.

==== Results summary ====
| Overall | | | | | | | | Home | | | | | | Away | | | | | |
| Pld | W | D | L | GF | GA | GD | Pts | W | D | L | GF | GA | GD | W | D | L | GF | GA | GD |
|---|---|---|---|---|---|---|---|---|---|---|---|---|---|---|---|---|---|---|---|
| 46 | 14 | 18 | 14 | 49 | 52 | −3 | 60 | 7 | 10 | 6 | 28 | 26 | +2 | 7 | 8 | 8 | 21 | 26 | −5 |

Source: Statto

==== Results by round ====
| Round | 1 | 2 | 3 | 4 | 5 | 6 | 7 | 8 | 9 | 10 | 11 | 12 | 13 | 14 | 15 | 16 | 17 | 18 | 19 | 20 | 21 | 22 | 23 | 24 | 25 | 26 | 27 | 28 | 29 | 30 | 31 | 32 | 33 | 34 | 35 | 36 | 37 | 38 | 39 | 40 | 41 | 42 | 43 | 44 | 45 | 46 |
|---|---|---|---|---|---|---|---|---|---|---|---|---|---|---|---|---|---|---|---|---|---|---|---|---|---|---|---|---|---|---|---|---|---|---|---|---|---|---|---|---|---|---|---|---|---|---|
| Ground | H | A | A | H | A | H | A | A | H | H | A | H | A | A | H | H | A | A | H | H | A | A | A | H | A | H | H | A | H | A | A | H | A | H | A | H | A | H | A | H | H | A | A | H | A | H |
| Result | W | L | D | D | L | W | W | D | L | D | D | W | D | L | L | L | W | L | W | D | L | L | D | D | W | W | L | W | D | W | L | D | W | W | L | W | D | D | D | D | L | W | D | D | L | D |
| Position | 6 | 14 | 12 | 12 | 16 | 17 | 13 | 9 | 9 | 11 | 13 | 14 | 11 | 12 | 14 | 15 | 16 | 14 | 17 | 15 | 17 | 19 | 18 | 19 | 16 | 14 | 14 | 14 | 14 | 14 | 11 | 10 | 11 | 11 | 10 | 10 | 10 | 10 | 12 | 13 | 13 | 10 | 10 | 12 | 14 | 14 |

Source: Statto.com
A = Away; H = Home; W = Win; D = Draw; L = Loss

=== Championship ===
| Date | Opponent | Venue | Result F–A | Scorers | Attendance | Referee | Ref. |
|---|---|---|---|---|---|---|---|
| 7 August 2004 | Derby County | Home | 1–0 | Richardson 19' | 30,459 | Clattenburg | |
| 10 August 2004 | Gillingham | Away | 1–2 | Pugh 80' | 10,739 | Styles | |
| 14 August 2004 | Wolverhampton Wanderers | Away | 0–0 | | 28,397 | Laws | |
| 21 August 2004 | Nottingham Forest | Home | 1–1 | Guppy 25' | 31,808 | Pike | |
| 29 September 2004 | Sheffield United | Away | 0–2 | | 22,959 | Dowd | |
| 11 September 2004 | Coventry City | Home | 3–0 | Carlisle 40', Joachim 71', Pugh 90' | 26,725 | Robinson | |
| 14 September 2004 | Plymouth Argyle | Away | 1–0 | Keith 43' o.g. | 20,555 | Dunn | |
| 18 September 2004 | Crewe Alexandra | Away | 2–2 | Pugh 53', 89' | 9,095 | Joslin | |
| 24 September 2004 | Sunderland | Home | 0–1 | | 28,926 | Ryan | |
| 28 September 2004 | Stoke City | Home | 0–0 | | 25,759 | Mason | |
| 2 October 2004 | Cardiff City | Away | 0–0 | | 17,006 | Crossley | |
| 16 October 2004 | Preston North End | Home | 1–0 | Pugh 78' | 30,458 | Laws | |
| 19 October 2004 | Reading | Away | 1–1 | Walton 1' | 22,230 | Olivier | |
| 23 October 2004 | Brighton & Hove Albion | Away | 0–1 | | 6,716 | Beeby | |
| 31 October 2004 | Wigan Athletic | Home | 0–2 | | 27,432 | Dean | |
| 3 November 2004 | Burnley | Home | 1–2 | Wright 1' | 27,490 | Dowd | |
| 6 November 2004 | Preston North End | Away | 4–2 | Deane 13', Healy 15', 44', Walton 72' | 18,531 | Penton | |
| 13 November 2004 | Ipswich Town | Away | 0–1 | | 29,955 | Wiley | |
| 20 November 2004 | Queens Park Rangers | Home | 6–1 | Healy 9', Deane 13', 42', 44', 72', Wright 23' | 29,739 | Webster | |
| 24 November 2004 | Watford | Home | 2–2 | Wright 21', Carlisle 86' | 24,585 | Jones | |
| 29 November 2004 | Rotherham United | Away | 0–1 | | 8,860 | Crossley | |
| 4 December 2004 | Leicester City | Home | 0–2 | | 27,384 | Rennie | |
| 10 December 2004 | West Ham United | Away | 1–1 | Healy 90' pen. | 30,684 | Pike | |
| 19 December 2004 | Millwall | Home | 1–1 | Oster 43' | 26,265 | Leake | |
| 26 December 2004 | Sunderland | Away | 3–2 | Lennon 30', Deane 61', Joachim 85' | 43,253 | Beeby | |
| 28 December 2004 | Plymouth Argyle | Home | 2–1 | Gilbert 46' o.g., Healy 90' | 34,496 | Salisbury | |
| 1 January 2005 | Crewe Alexandra | Home | 0–2 | | 32,302 | Marriner | |
| 3 January 2005 | Coventry City | Away | 2–1 | Blake 28', Healy 65' | 19,084 | Miller | |
| 15 January 2005 | Cardiff City | Home | 1–1 | Walton 14' | 29,548 | Barry | |
| 22 January 2005 | Stoke City | Away | 1–0 | Thomas 72' o.g. | 18,372 | Williamson | |
| 26 January 2005 | Derby County | Away | 0–2 | | 25,648 | Taylor | |
| 29 January 2005 | Brighton & Hove Albion | Home | 1–1 | Carlisle 43' | 27,033 | Thorpe | |
| 5 February 2005 | Burnley | Away | 1–0 | Einarsson 66' | 17,789 | Webster | |
| 12 February 2005 | Reading | Home | 3–1 | Healy 36', Hulse 56', 63' | 30,034 | Foy | |
| 19 February 2005 | Wigan Athletic | Away | 0–3 | | 17,177 | Joslin | |
| 26 February 2005 | West Ham United | Home | 2–1 | Hulse 51', Derry 86' | 34,115 | Hall | |
| 6 March 2005 | Millwall | Away | 1–1 | Hulse 78' | 11,510 | Knight | |
| 12 March 2005 | Gillingham | Home | 1–1 | Hulse 81' | 27,995 | Cowburn | |
| 16 March 2005 | Nottingham Forest | Away | 0–0 | | 25,101 | Salisbury | |
| 2 April 2005 | Wolverhampton Wanderers | Home | 1–1 | Derry 50' | 29,773 | Crossley | |
| 5 April 2005 | Sheffield United | Home | 0–4 | | 28,936 | Walton | |
| 9 April 2005 | Watford | Away | 2–1 | Hulse 28', Carlisle 67' | 16,306 | Miller | |
| 16 April 2005 | Queens Park Rangers | Away | 1–1 | Johnson 24' | 18,182 | Olivier | |
| 23 April 2005 | Ipswich Town | Home | 1–1 | Spring 12' | 29,607 | Webster | |
| 1 May 2005 | Leicester City | Away | 0–2 | | 26,593 | Laws | |
| 8 May 2005 | Rotherham United | Home | 0–0 | | 30,900 | Mason | |

=== FA Cup ===
| Round | Date | Opponent | Venue | Result F–A | Scorers | Attendance | Referee | Ref. |
|---|---|---|---|---|---|---|---|---|
| Third Round | 8 January 2005 | Birmingham City | Away | 0–3 | | 25,159 | Poll | |

=== League Cup ===
| Round | Date | Opponent | Venue | Result F–A | Scorers | Attendance | Referee | Ref. |
|---|---|---|---|---|---|---|---|---|
| First Round | 24 August 2004 | Huddersfield Town | Home | 1–0 | Pugh 23' | 30,115 | Ilderton | |
| Second Round | 21 September 2004 | Swindon Town | Home | 1–0 | Ricketts 9' | 18,476 | Curson | |
| Third Round | 26 October 2004 | Portsmouth | Away | 1–2 | Deane 40' | 15,215 | Bennett | |

== Statistics ==
| No. | Pos. | Name | League | | FA Cup | | League Cup | | Total | | Discipline | |
| No. | Pos. | Name | Apps | Goals | Apps | Goals | Apps | Goals | Apps | Goals | Yellow card | Red card |
|---|---|---|---|---|---|---|---|---|---|---|---|---|
| 1 | GK | (Scotland) Neil Sullivan | 46 | 0 | 1 | 0 | 3 | 0 | 50 | 0 | 2 | 0 |
| 2 | DF | (Republic of Ireland) Gary Kelly | 43 | 0 | 1 | 0 | 3 | 0 | 47 | 0 | 5 | 0 |
| 3 | DF | (Scotland) Stephen Crainey | 9 | 0 | 0 | 0 | 1 | 0 | 10 | 0 | 0 | 0 |
| 4 | DF | (England) Clarke Carlisle | 29+6 | 4 | 0 | 0 | 3 | 0 | 32+6 | 4 | 6 | 1 |
| 5 | DF | (South Africa) Lucas Radebe | 1+2 | 0 | 0 | 0 | 0 | 0 | 1+2 | 0 | 0 | 0 |
| 6 | DF | (Republic of Ireland) Paul Butler | 39 | 0 | 0 | 0 | 2 | 0 | 41 | 0 | 3 | 2 |
| 7 | MF | (England) Jermaine Wright | 33+2 | 3 | 0 | 0 | 1 | 0 | 35+2 | 3 | 3 | 0 |
| 8 | MF | (England) Sean Gregan | 34+1 | 0 | 1 | 0 | 2 | 0 | 37+1 | 0 | 14 | 0 |
| 9 | FW | (England) Brett Ormerod | 6 | 0 | 0 | 0 | 0 | 0 | 6 | 0 | 0 | 0 |
| 9 | FW | (Northern Ireland) David Healy | 27+1 | 7 | 1 | 0 | 0 | 0 | 28+1 | 7 | 5 | 0 |
| 10 | FW | (England) Michael Ricketts | 9+12 | 0 | 0 | 0 | 2+1 | 1 | 11+13 | 1 | 4 | 0 |
| 11 | FW | (England) Julian Joachim | 10+17 | 2 | 0+1 | 0 | 3 | 0 | 13+18 | 2 | 1 | 0 |
| 12 | DF | (England) Danny Pugh | 33+5 | 5 | 0+1 | 0 | 3 | 1 | 36+6 | 6 | 6 | 0 |
| 14 | MF | (France) Léandre Griffit | 0+1 | 0 | 0 | 0 | 0 | 0 | 0+1 | 0 | 0 | 0 |
| 14 | MF | (Wales) John Oster | 8 | 1 | 0 | 0 | 0 | 0 | 8 | 1 | 0 | 0 |
| 14 | FW | (Jamaica) Marlon King | 4+5 | 0 | 0 | 0 | 0 | 0 | 4+5 | 0 | 0 | 0 |
| 15 | DF | (England) Frazer Richardson | 28+10 | 1 | 0 | 0 | 2 | 0 | 30+10 | 1 | 1 | 0 |
| 16 | FW | (England) Danny Cadamarteri | 0 | 0 | 0 | 0 | 0+1 | 0 | 0 | 0 | 1 | 0 |
| 16 | MF | (Iceland) Gylfi Einarsson | 6+2 | 1 | 0 | 0 | 0 | 0 | 6+2 | 1 | 1 | 0 |
| 17 | MF | (England) Matthew Spring | 4+9 | 1 | 0 | 0 | 2 | 0 | 6+9 | 1 | 0 | 0 |
| 18 | MF | (England) Simon Walton | 23+7 | 3 | 1 | 0 | 1 | 0 | 25+7 | 3 | 6 | 0 |
| 19 | MF | (Norway) Eirik Bakke | 0+1 | 0 | 0 | 0 | 0 | 0 | 0+1 | 0 | 1 | 0 |
| 20 | MF | (England) Seth Johnson | 4+2 | 1 | 0 | 0 | 0 | 0 | 0 | 0 | 1 | 0 |
| 21 | FW | (Wales) Nathan Blake | 2 | 1 | 1 | 0 | 0 | 0 | 2 | 1 | 1 | 0 |
| 21 | MF | (England) Shaun Derry | 7 | 2 | 0 | 0 | 0 | 0 | 7 | 2 | 2 | 1 |
| 22 | DF | (England) Michael Duberry | 4 | 0 | 1 | 0 | 0 | 0 | 5 | 0 | 2 | 1 |
| 22 | FW | (England) Ian Thomas-Moore | 4+2 | 0 | 0 | 0 | 0 | 0 | 4+2 | 0 | 0 | 0 |
| 24 | MF | (England) Steve Guppy | 1+2 | 1 | 0 | 0 | 1 | 0 | 2+2 | 1 | 0 | 0 |
| 25 | MF | (England) Aaron Lennon | 19+8 | 1 | 1 | 0 | 0+1 | 0 | 20+9 | 1 | 1 | 0 |
| 26 | DF | (England) Matthew Kilgallon | 26 | 0 | 1 | 0 | 1 | 0 | 28 | 0 | 2 | 1 |
| 27 | MF | (Scotland) Martin Woods | 0+1 | 0 | 0 | 0 | 0 | 0 | 0+1 | 0 | 0 | 0 |
| 28 | MF | (Australia) Jamie McMaster | 0+7 | 0 | 0 | 0 | 1+1 | 0 | 1+8 | 0 | 1 | 0 |
| 29 | FW | (England) Rob Hulse | 13 | 6 | 0 | 0 | 0 | 0 | 13 | 6 | 6 | 0 |
| 30 | FW | (England) Brian Deane | 23+8 | 6 | 0 | 0 | 1+1 | 1 | 24+9 | 7 | 4 | 0 |
| 33 | DF | (England) Michael Gray | 10 | 0 | 0 | 0 | 0 | 0 | 10 | 0 | 0 | 1 |
| 38 | FW | (Republic of Ireland) Andy Keogh | 0 | 0 | 0 | 0 | 0+1 | 0 | 0+1 | 0 | 0 | 0 |
| 39 | FW | (England) Simon Johnson | 0 | 0 | 0 | 0 | 1 | 0 | 1 | 0 | 0 | 0 |

== Transfers ==
=== In ===
| Date | Pos. | Name | From | Fee | Ref. |
|---|---|---|---|---|---|
| 12 June 2004 | DF | (Republic of Ireland) Paul Butler | (England) Wolverhampton Wanderers | Free | |
| 23 June 2004 | FW | (England) Julian Joachim | (England) Coventry City | Free | |
| 23 June 2004 | FW | (England) Michael Ricketts | (England) Middlesbrough | Free | |
| 30 June 2004 | MF | (England) Jermaine Wright | (England) Ipswich Town | Free | |
| 1 July 2004 | MF | (England) Craig Hignett | (England) Leicester City | Free | |
| 1 July 2004 | DF | (England) Clarke Carlisle | (England) Queens Park Rangers | Free | |
| 1 July 2004 | FW | (England) Danny Cadamarteri | (England) Bradford City | Free | |
| 1 July 2004 | MF | (England) Matthew Spring | (England) Luton Town | Undisclosed | |
| 1 July 2004 | MF | (England) Danny Pugh | (England) Manchester United | Free | |
| 22 July 2004 | FW | (England) Brian Deane | (England) West Ham United | Free | |
| 31 July 2004 | GK | (Scotland) Neil Sullivan | (England) Chelsea | Free | |
| 1 August 2004 | FW | (England) Steve Guppy | (England) Leicester City | Free | |
| 10 August 2004 | FW | (Scotland) Stephen Crainey | (England) Southampton | £200,000 | |
| 20 August 2004 | DF | (Cameroon) Serge Branco | (Germany) VfB Stuttgart | Free | |
| 16 September 2004 | MF | (England) Sean Gregan | (England) West Bromwich Albion | £750,000 | |
| 28 October 2004 | FW | (Northern Ireland) David Healy | (England) Preston North End | £650,000 | |
| 1 January 2005 | MF | (Iceland) Gylfi Einarsson | (Norway) Lillestrøm SK | Free | |
| 18 February 2005 | MF | (England) Shaun Derry | (England) Crystal Palace | Undisclosed | |
| 25 February 2005 | GK | (England) Kevin Pressman | (England) Leicester City | Free | |
| 1 March 2005 | GK | (Serbia and Montenegro) Saša Ilić | (Scotland) Aberdeen | Free | |
| 23 March 2005 | FW | (England) Ian Moore | (England) Burnley | £50,000 | |

=== Out ===
| Date | Pos. | Name | To | Fee | Ref. |
|---|---|---|---|---|---|
| 14 May 2004 | GK | (England) Paul Robinson | (England) Tottenham Hotspur | £1,500,000 | |
| 24 May 2004 | FW | (England) Alan Smith | (England) Manchester United | £7,000,000 | |
| 9 June 2004 | FW | (England) Michael Bridges | (England) Bolton Wanderers | Free | |
| 1 July 2004 | MF | (England) Jason Wilcox | (England) Leicester City | Free | |
| 1 July 2004 | MF | (England) David Batty | Retired | | |
| 2 July 2004 | MF | (England) James Milner | (England) Newcastle United | £5,000,000 | |
| 2 July 2004 | MF | (Republic of Ireland) Stephen McPhail | (England) Barnsley | Undisclosed | |
| 2 July 2004 | FW | (Australia) Mark Viduka | (England) Middlesbrough | £4,000,000 | |
| 3 July 2004 | DF | (Republic of Ireland) Ian Harte | (Spain) Levante | Undisclosed | |
| 6 July 2004 | MF | (England) Nick Barmby | (England) Hull City | Free | |
| 7 July 2004 | DF | (Scotland) Dominic Matteo | (England) Blackburn Rovers | Free | |
| 13 July 2004 | DF | (England) Danny Mills | (England) Manchester City | Free | |
| 1 September 2004 | DF | (Cameroon) Serge Branco | (England) Queens Park Rangers | Free | |
| 8 September 2004 | MF | (England) Craig Hignett | (England) Darlington | Free | |
| 13 September 2004 | FW | (England) Steve Guppy | (England) Stoke City | Free | |
| 30 September 2004 | FW | (England) Danny Cadamarteri | (England) Sheffield United | £50,000 | |
| 21 January 2005 | GK | (England) Scott Carson | (England) Liverpool | £1,000,000 | |
| 14 February 2005 | FW | (Republic of Ireland) Andy Keogh | (England) Scunthorpe United | Undisclosed | |
| 24 March 2005 | FW | (England) Brian Deane | (England) Sunderland | Free | |
| 24 March 2005 | GK | (England) Kevin Pressman | (England) Coventry City | Free | |

=== Loan in ===
| Date from | Date to | Pos. | Name | From | Ref. |
|---|---|---|---|---|---|
| 19 September 2004 | 19 October 2004 | FW | (England) Brett Ormerod | (England) Southampton | |
| 5 November 2004 | 5 December 2004 | FW | (Wales) John Oster | (England) Sunderland | |
| 31 December 2004 | 31 January 2005 | FW | (Wales) Nathan Blake | (England) Leicester City | |
| 6 January 2005 | 6 February 2005 | FW | (France) Leandre Griffit | (England) Southampton | |
| 21 January 2005 | 21 February 2005 | GK | (England) Paul Harrison | (England) Liverpool | |
| 3 February 2005 | 3 May 2005 | DF | (England) Michael Gray | (England) Blackburn Rovers | |
| 9 February 2005 | 30 June 2005 | FW | (England) Rob Hulse | (England) West Bromwich Albion | |
| 4 March 2005 | 4 June 2005 | FW | (Jamaica) Marlon King | (England) Nottingham Forest | |

=== Loan out ===
| Date from | Date to | Pos. | Name | To | Ref. |
|---|---|---|---|---|---|
| 15 October 2004 | 15 January 2005 | DF | (England) Michael Duberry | (England) Stoke City | |
| 18 February 2005 | 18 March 2005 | FW | (England) Harpal Singh | (England) Stockport County | |
| 4 March 2005 | 30 June 2005 | MF | (Australia) Jamie McMaster | (England) Chesterfied | |
| 24 March 2005 | 30 June 2005 | FW | (England) Harpal Singh | (England) Stockport County | |
