= 2007 Football League Championship play-off final =

Association football match in London

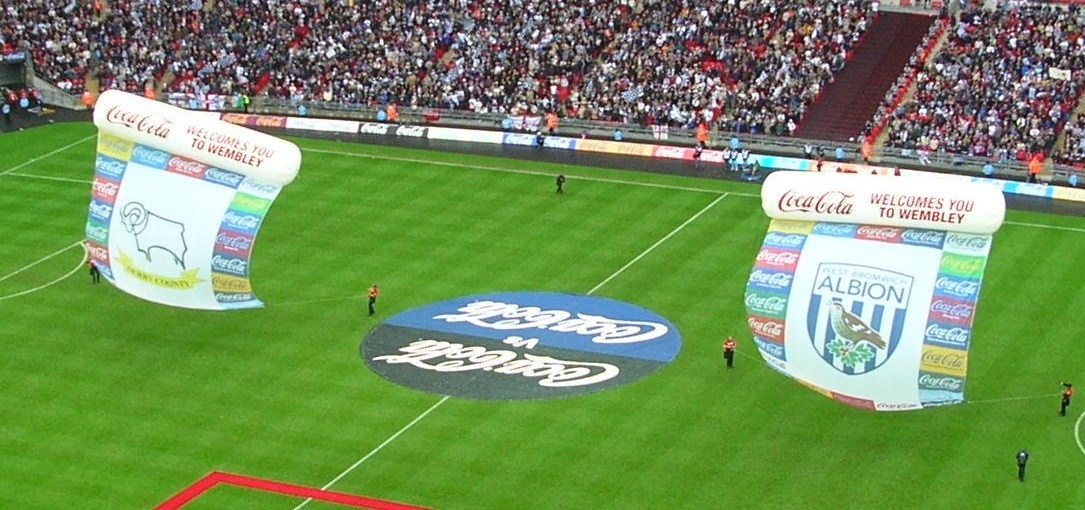
- Derby County and West Bromwich Albion crests before kick-off
Derby County	West Bromwich Albion
1	0
- Date: 28 May 2007
- Venue: Wembley Stadium, London
- Referee: Graham Poll (Hertfordshire)
- Attendance: 74,993
- Weather: Rain

The 2007 Football League Championship play-off final was an association football match which was played on 28 May 2007 at Wembley Stadium, London, between Derby County and West Bromwich Albion. The match was to determine the third and final team to gain promotion from the Football League Championship, the second tier of English football, to the Premier League. The top two teams of the 2006–07 Football League Championship season gained automatic promotion to the Premier League, while the clubs placed from third to sixth place in the table partook in play-off semi-finals; Derby County ended the season in third position while West Bromwich Albion finished fourth. The winners of these semi-finals competed for the final place for the 2007–08 season in the Premier League. Winning the game was estimated to be worth up to £60 million to the successful team.

The 2007 final, refereed by Graham Poll in his final domestic match, was watched by a crowd of nearly 75,000 people. The game was won by Derby County 1–0, with the only goal of the game coming from Stephen Pearson in the second half.

Derby County ended the next season in bottom place in the Premier League, with the fewest points in the league's history, and were relegated back to the Championship. West Bromwich Albion finished the following season top of the Championship and were promoted to the Premier League.

== Route to the final ==
Football League Championship final table, leading positions
Pos	Team	Pld	W	D	L	GF	GA	GD	Pts
1	Sunderland	46	27	7	12	76	47	+29	88
2	Birmingham City	46	26	8	12	67	42	+25	86
3	Derby County	46	25	9	12	62	46	+16	84
4	West Bromwich Albion	46	22	10	14	81	55	+26	76
5	Wolverhampton Wanderers	46	22	10	14	59	56	+3	76
6	Southampton	46	21	12	13	77	53	+24	75

Derby County finished the regular 2006–07 season in third place in the Football League Championship, the second tier of the English football league system, one place and eight points ahead of West Bromwich Albion. Both therefore missed out on the two automatic places for promotion to the Premier League and instead took part in the play-offs to determine the third promoted team. Derby County finished two points behind Birmingham City (who were promoted in second place) and four behind league winners Sunderland.

Derby County's opponents in their play-off semi-final were Southampton, with the first leg played at St Mary's Stadium on 12 May 2007. Andrew Surman put the home team into the lead early in the first half with a strike from 20 yards (18 m) but Steve Howard scored for Derby either side of half time, to secure a 2–1 win for the visitors. The second leg was played three days later at Pride Park Stadium. Darren Moore scored after three minutes for Derby but Jhon Viáfara equalised a minute later and the first half ended 1–1. Viáfara scored his and Southampton's second goal in the 54th minute before an own goal from Leon Best levelled the game at 2–2. With one minute of regular time remaining, Grzegorz Rasiak scored to make it 3–2 to Southampton, and 4–4 on aggregate, sending the game into extra time. No further goals were scored so the match was decided by a penalty shoot-out. Former Derby player Iñigo Idiakez missed Southampton's fifth penalty to send Derby into the final.

West Bromwich Albion faced Wolverhampton Wanderers, their local rivals, in the second play-off semi-final. The first leg was played at Molineux Stadium in Wolverhampton on 13 May 2007. Kevin Phillips opened the scoring midway through the first half with a 20-yard (18 m) strike to put the visitors ahead but Jody Craddock equalised with a header just before half time. Seyi Olofinjana put Wolves ahead early in the second half but Phillips scored his and Albion's second two minutes later. Dean Kiely, the West Brom goalkeeper, made several saves in the second half before Diomansy Kamara scored in the 73rd minute, and the match ended 3–2. The second leg was played at The Hawthorns four days later. After a goalless first half, Phillips scored with a header midway through the second half. Wolves failed to score and the match ended 1–0. Albion progressed to the final 4–2 on aggregate. The second leg was the fifth meeting between the two teams during 2006–07, setting a new record for the most times that the Black Country derby has been contested in a single campaign, while Albion's four wins against their rivals was also a season record for matches between the two.

Derby County			Round	West Bromwich Albion
Opponent	Result	Legs	Semi-finals	Opponent	Result	Legs
Southampton	4–4 (4–3 pens)	2–1 away; 2–3 home		Wolverhampton Wanderers	4–2	3–2 away; 1–0 home

== Match ==
=== Background ===
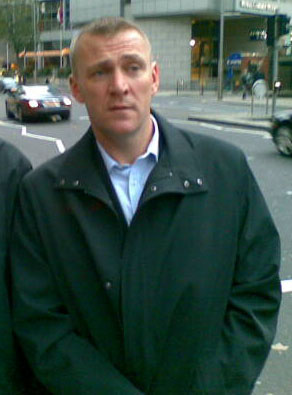
The match referee was Graham Poll who was officiating his last domestic game.

The two teams were competing for promotion to the Premier League, the top division of the English football league system. Both clubs had been founder members of the Football League in 1888 and had spent the majority of their respective histories competing in English football's top division. During the regular season, each club had recorded a home win against the other, Derby beating Albion 2–1 at Pride Park in early November and Albion winning 1–0 at The Hawthorns a month later. This was West Bromwich Albion's second play-off final as they had beaten Port Vale 3–0 at the old Wembley Stadium in the 1993 Football League Second Division play-off final. Derby had made it to the play-offs four times previously, but had qualified for the final once: they lost the 1994 Football League First Division play-off final 2–1 against Leicester City. Kamara was the top marksman for West Bromwich Albion, with 21 goals, followed by Phillips on 19. Olofinjana was Wolves' highest scorer with 10 for the season. Winning the game was estimated to be worth up to £60 million to the successful team.

The match was the first Championship play-off final to be held at the rebuilt Wembley Stadium. Both clubs were competing at there for the first time, though Derby County had played at the original Wembley Stadium four times and West Bromwich Albion seven times. The attendance of 74,993 was significantly higher than the 64,736 registered at the 2006 final, yet still far short of Wembley's 90,000 capacity. The Football League chairman Brian Mawhinney commented that "We could have sold the tickets but Wembley weren't able to, didn't want to, couldn't allow us to sell the tickets." Wembley Stadium however, said that empty Club Wembley seats could have been re-sold, but that they were unable to reach an agreement with the Football League on the matter. Both clubs received a ticket allocation of around 33,500, which was insufficient to meet the demands of supporters.

The match was refereed by Graham Poll representing the Hertfordshire County Football Association. It was the last domestic match he would officiate before his retirement. Derby County made a single change to their lineup from the team who won the penalty shootout in the semi-final, with Paul Peschisolido replaced by Jon Macken. West Brom's team was unchanged from that which defeated Wolves in the semi-final. Prior to kick-off, the United Kingdom's national anthem, "God Save the Queen", was sung by Garðar Thór Cortes, and both teams were then presented to Mawhinney. Derby wore their traditional home kit of white shirts while West Bromwich Albion were in all-black.

=== First half ===
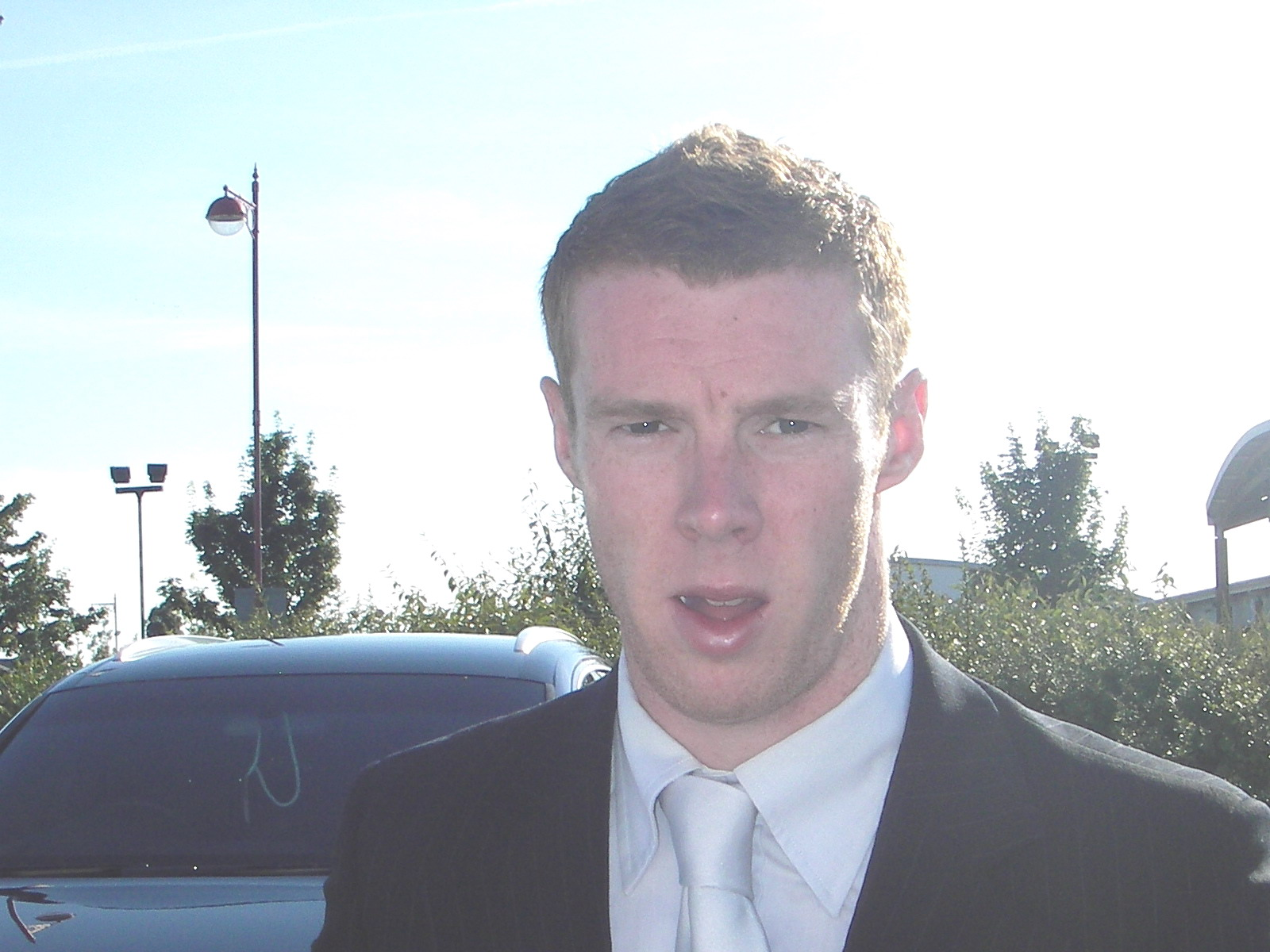
Stephen Pearson scored the only goal of the match.

Derby County kicked the game off around 3 p.m., in rainy conditions. within the first minute, Kamara's shot across goal was saved by the Derby goalkeeper Stephen Bywater before being cleared. In the tenth minute, Howard won the ball in the air and passed it between two Derby defenders to Peschisolido whose shot was straight at Kiely. Two minutes later, Jason Koumas rounded three defenders and with only Bywater to beat in the Derby goal, Tyrone Mears made the tackle; penalty appeals from West Bromwich Albion were ignored by the referee Poll. On 18 minutes, Matt Oakley passed to Craig Fagan who advanced into the penalty area but struck his shot wide. Three minutes later, a free kick from West Brom deflected off the Derby wall and had to be gathered by Bywater. The first yellow card of the afternoon was shown in the 31st minute to Peschisolido after a foul on Paul Robinson. In the 34th minute, Derby's Seth Johnson chipped the ball forwards, Howard chested it into Jay McEveley's path, but his low shot was saved. Sam Sodje was then booked for a foul on Johnson before Paul McShane was shown a yellow card for a high foot on Howard. In the 41st minute, Koumas shot over the crossbar before Zoltán Gera passed to Phillips whose strike grazed the woodwork. After a minute of stoppage time, the half was brought to an end with the score 0–0.

=== Second half ===
No changes were made by either team during the break and West Brom kicked off the second half. Bywater made an early save from a Koumas shot before Mears was booked in the 47th minute for a foul on Kamara. In the 57th minute, Phillips passed to Koumas whose strike from 25 yards (23 m) was high and wide. Peschisolido was then replaced by Giles Barnes, before Derby's Oakley hit a first-time shot from a Fagan cross which was saved one handed by Kiely. In the 61st Stephen Pearson put Derby County ahead: Barnes received the ball from Howard and played a square ball into the Albion penalty area which Pearson slid into the bottom left-hand corner of the net from 6 yards (5.5 m) to score his first goal for the club. Three minutes later, Chris Perry became the third Albion player to be booked after he fouled Barnes. Gera's long-range shot was then gathered by Bywater on the second attempt before he was substituted off for Darren Carter along with Nathan Ellington replaced by McShane in the 71st minute. Bywater then saved a Robinson header from a Koumas corner. With ten minutes remaining, Sodje was taken off and replaced by Neil Clement, then Derby's Fagan was substituted for Marc Edworthy. Five minutes later, Jonathan Greening's tackle prevented Barnes from getting his shot away, then Mears took the ball from the toes of Carter. In the 87th minute, Derby made their final substitution of the game with David Jones coming on for Johnson. Four minutes of injury was indicated and a Koumas cross failed to find any of his teammates. In the final minute of the match, a mass brawl broke out after Oakley fouled Koumas, resulting in bookings for Jones, Oakley and Bywater. The resulting free kick from Clement was cleared and the match was brought to an end, Derby County winning 1–0.

=== Details ===
28 May 2007
15:00 BST

Derby County	1–0	West Bromwich Albion
Pearson 61'	(Report), (summary)

Wembley Stadium, London
Attendance: 74,993
Referee: Graham Poll (Hertfordshire)

Derby County	West Bromwich Albion

43	(England) Stephen Bywater	(yellow card) 90'
24	(England) Tyrone Mears	(yellow card) 47'
5	(England) Dean Leacock
23	(Jamaica) Darren Moore
4	(Scotland) Jay McEveley
11	(England) Craig Fagan		(substituted off) 83'
22	(England) Matt Oakley (c)	(yellow card) 90'
18	(England) Seth Johnson		(substituted off) 87'
25	(Scotland) Stephen Pearson
9	(England) Steve Howard
10	(Canada) Paul Peschisolido	(yellow card) 31'	(substituted off) 58'
Substitutes:
13	(England) Lee Camp
2	(England) Marc Edworthy		(substituted on) 83'
7	(England) David Jones	(yellow card) 90'	(substituted on) 87'
28	(England) Giles Barnes		(substituted on) 58'
12	(Republic of Ireland) Jon Macken
Manager:
(Scotland) Billy Davies

31	(Republic of Ireland) Dean Kiely
20	(Republic of Ireland) Paul McShane	(yellow card) 40'	(substituted off) 71'
4	(England) Chris Perry	(yellow card) 65'
34	(Nigeria) Sam Sodje	(yellow card) 37'	(substituted off) 81'
3	(England) Paul Robinson (c)
19	(Wales) Jason Koumas
8	(England) Jonathan Greening
11	(Hungary) Zoltán Gera		(substituted off) 71'
16	(Slovenia) Robert Koren
15	(Senegal) Diomansy Kamara
21	(England) Kevin Phillips
Substitutes:
30	(England) Luke Daniels
5	(England) Neil Clement		(substituted on) 81'
12	(England) Richard Chaplow
17	(England) Darren Carter		(substituted on) 71'
9	(England) Nathan Ellington		(substituted on) 71'
Manager:
(England) Tony Mowbray

=== Statistics ===
Statistics
	Derby County	West Bromwich Albion
Total shots	7	17
Shots on target	4	7
Ball possession	46%	54%
Corner kicks	4	6
Fouls committed	24	11
Offsides	4	4
Yellow cards	5	3
Red cards	0	0

== Post-match ==
Derby County manager Billy Davies said that his players "showed great courage" and added that winning promotion was "a dream come true". Davies emphasised the importance of scoring the first goal and pointed out how organised and well-prepared his team had been. Tony Mowbray, the manager of West Bromwich Albion, believed that his team were the better team in a tight match, but said that "you don't always get what you deserve."

The final was regarded as the most financially lucrative single match in world club football according to accounting firm Deloitte, who estimated that Derby's promotion would earn them in the region of £60 million. A prior agreement between the chairmen of the two clubs, Peter Gadsby and Jeremy Peace, meant that as losers, West Bromwich Albion took the entire £3 million in gate receipts from the final. The day after the match, thousands of Derby County supporters lined the streets of the city as the club's staff and players took part in an open top bus tour.

Upon their return to the top division, Derby County recorded the lowest points total since the Premier League began, thus were relegated back to the Championship. Meanwhile, West Bromwich Albion won the Championship title in 2007–08 to achieve automatic promotion to the Premier League, though they were also relegated after a single season.

== See also ==
- 2007 Football League One play-off final
- 2007 Football League Two play-off final
- 2007 Conference National play-off final
