= Danny Pugh =

English football player & manager

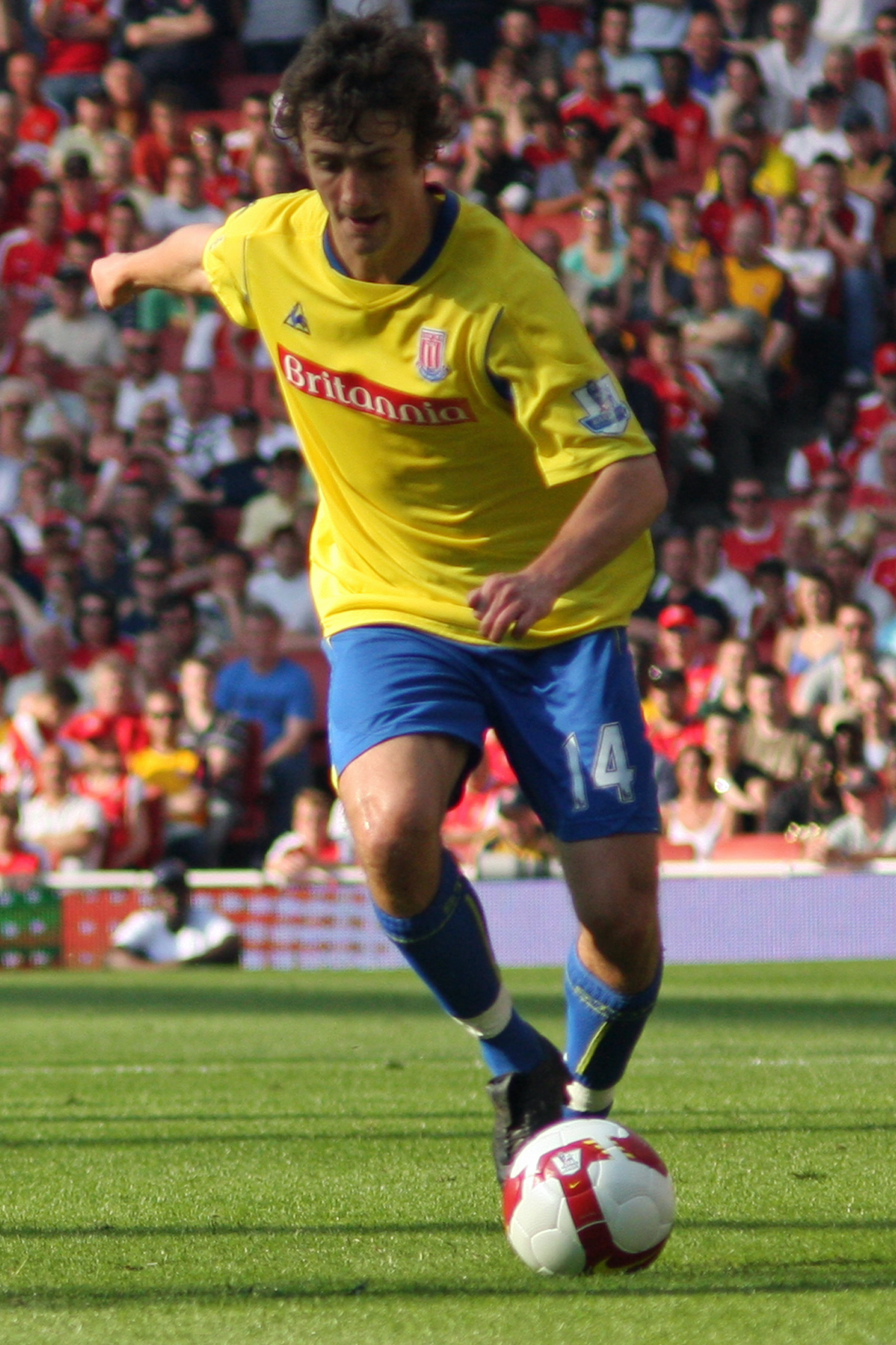
- Pugh playing for Stoke City in May 2009

Personal information
- Full name: Daniel Adam Pugh
- Date of birth: 19 October 1982 (age 44)
- Place of birth: Cheadle Hulme, England
- Height: 6 ft 0 in (1.83 m)
- Positions: Midfielder; left-back

Team information
- Current team: Stoke City U18s (coach)

Youth career
- 1992–2000: Manchester United

Senior career*
Years	Team	Apps	(Gls)
2000–2004	Manchester United	1	(0)
2004–2006	Leeds United	50	(5)
2006–2008	Preston North End	52	(4)
2007–2008	→ Stoke City (loan)	14	(0)
2008–2012	Stoke City	53	(1)
2010	→ Preston North End (loan)	5	(0)
2011–2012	→ Leeds United (loan)	17	(2)
2012–2014	Leeds United	41	(2)
2013	→ Sheffield Wednesday (loan)	16	(1)
2014–2015	Coventry City	5	(0)
2015–2016	Bury	39	(0)
2016–2017	Blackpool	18	(0)
2017–2020	Port Vale	48	(2)
2021–2022	Hanley Town	9	(1)
Total		368	(18)

Managerial career
- 2019: Port Vale (caretaker)
- 2021: Port Vale (caretaker)
- * Club domestic league appearances and goals

Daniel Adam Pugh (born 19 October 1982) is an English professional football coach and former footballer. He is currently a coach with Stoke City U18s.

A versatile player, he could play in the midfield or at left-back. He began his career with Manchester United and made a handful of first-team appearances before being transferred to Leeds United in May 2004. He spent two seasons at Elland Road before joining Preston North End for a fee of £250,000 in June 2006. Another two-year spell followed until he joined Stoke City for £500,000 in January after a short loan period. He became a regular under Tony Pulis and helped the club to gain promotion out of the Championship in 2007–08. He appeared in the 2011 FA Cup final. However, he struggled to hold down a regular place in the Premier League and had loan spells back at Preston and then Leeds before joining Leeds permanently for a second time in January 2012.

He made 62 appearances in his second spell at Leeds and played on loan at Sheffield Wednesday in the 2012–13 season. He left Leeds and went on to spend the 2014–15 season with Coventry City the 2015–16 campaign at Bury before moving on to Blackpool in July 2016. He signed with Port Vale in January 2017 and was appointed as a first-team coach in September 2018. He became Vale's caretaker manager in January 2019 and January 2021.

== Playing career ==
=== Manchester United ===
Pugh came through the youth ranks at Manchester United, signing as a professional on 18 July 2000. He made his first-team debut after coming on as a 75th-minute substitute for Ruud van Nistelrooy in a 5–2 win over Israeli side Maccabi Haifa in a UEFA Champions League group stage game at Old Trafford on 18 September 2002. He made his Premier League debut three days later, this time replacing Ryan Giggs with five minutes remaining of a 1–0 home victory over Tottenham Hotspur. He went on to make further appearances against Juventus and Deportivo de La Coruña in the second group stage of the Champions League. Having played five times in the 2002–03 season, he was given just two appearances by Alex Ferguson in the 2003–04 campaign.

=== Leeds United ===
In May 2004, Pugh was traded to derby rivals Leeds United in part-exchange for Alan Smith, becoming the first player signed by manager Kevin Blackwell. He scored his first goal in senior football on 10 August, as Leeds lost 2–1 at Gillingham in the Championship. He went on to score both of United's goals in a 2–2 draw at Crewe Alexandra on 18 September. He held down the left midfield position in a 4–4–2 formation for the first half of the 2004–05 season, before being switched to left-back after an injury to Stephen Crainey. However, Pugh fell out of favour at Leeds after Blackwell switched to a 4–3–3 formation, and he featured just 15 times in the 2005–06 campaign.

=== Preston North End ===
Pugh was sold to Championship rivals Preston North End in June 2006 for a fee of £250,000, becoming Paul Simpson's first signing as manager at Deepdale. He scored four goals in 49 games in the 2006–07 season, mainly playing tucked in off the left flank or occasionally as an out-and-out central midfielder.

=== Stoke City ===
On 2 November 2007, Pugh joined Stoke City initially on loan with a view to a permanent move in January; manager Tony Pulis was "delighted to have signed a quality left-sided midfielder". The move was made permanent on 3 January, with Stoke paying Preston £500,000 for Pugh's services. He played 32 games for Stoke in the 2007–08 season as the club secured promotion to the Premier League by finishing second in the Championship. However, he struggled to establish himself in the first-team during the 2008–09 season, featuring in just 17 Premier League games. He did, though, score his first goal for the club in a 2–0 win over Rotherham United in a League Cup match at the Britannia Stadium on 11 November. He signed a one-year contract extension in October 2009. He scored his first Premier League goal in a 3–1 home defeat to Arsenal on 27 February; however, he also gave away a penalty in the match.

After struggling for first-team appearances at Stoke, Pugh returned to his old club Preston North End on a one-month loan on 17 November 2010, along with fellow Stoke teammate Michael Tonge. The loan was extended into a second month but both Pugh and Tongue were recalled from their loan spell on 31 December after Preston sacked manager Darren Ferguson, the son of Pullis' close friend Sir Alex. He signed a new contract with Stoke whilst on loan at Preston, with Pulis remarking that Pugh was "an excellent professional... who can be relied upon to come in and do a good job if required". Pugh made only his second league start for Stoke in two seasons away at Birmingham City in February 2011. He made 18 appearances for Stoke in all competitions during the 2010–11 season, including an appearance as a late substitute for Glenn Whelan in the 1–0 defeat to Manchester City in the 2011 FA Cup final at Wembley Stadium. Pugh made six appearances at the start of the 2011–12 season and scored against Swiss side FC Thun the Europa League, giving Stoke a 1–0 win on 18 August. However, Pugh was left out Stoke's 25-man Premier League squad by manager Tony Pulis for the 2011–12 season. He left Stoke in January 2012 to rejoin Leeds United on a permanent transfer after five seasons with the "Potters", having made a total 89 appearances and scoring three goals for the club.

=== Return to Leeds United ===
On 22 September 2011, Pugh rejoined Simon Grayson's Leeds United on a three-month loan with the option to a permanent move. He made his second debut for Leeds the next day in a 3–3 draw with Brighton & Hove Albion. He scored his first goal of his second spell at Leeds in a 1–0 victory over Portsmouth at Elland Road on 1 October. He scored his second goal in consecutive games in a 3–0 win over Doncaster Rovers on 14 October. Due to the injury to Jonny Howson, Pugh moved into a central midfield position. He signed for Leeds on a two-and-a-half-year deal on 2 January 2012.

In August 2012, Leeds manager Neil Warnock announced that Pugh and teammate Robbie Rogers had been placed on the transfer list to generate funds for a new striker. He played just six games throughout the 2012–13 season. In January 2013, he joined Sheffield Wednesday on loan until the end of the season. Pugh was originally signed to fill in the left-wing position for Jérémy Hélan, who was set to leave Hillsborough; however, upon Hélan's return to the club, Pugh dropped back to the left-back position. Pugh made his debut for the "Owls" in a 2–1 away victory at Charlton Athletic on 26 January, and manager Dave Jones said that he was impressed with Pugh's debut. Pugh scored his first goal for Wednesday directly from a free kick in a 3–1 home victory over Brighton & Hove Albion on 2 February.

He made his first appearance of the 2013–14 season on 9 November, as Leeds recorded a 4–2 victory at Charlton Athletic; Pugh won a penalty in the second half. Manager Brian McDermott went on to praise Pugh, saying he "hadn't started a game all season and comes in and does that". Pugh finished the season with 22 appearances to his name, but was released by the club in May 2014.

=== Coventry City ===
Pugh joined Steven Pressley's Coventry City on a one-year contract in July 2014. He picked up an ankle injury which required surgery just two games into his Coventry career and lost his first-team place at left-back to Ryan Haynes. He played just five League One games throughout the 2014–15 campaign and was released by new manager Tony Mowbray in May 2015.

=== Bury ===
He joined David Flitcroft's Bury on a one-year contract in July 2015. He played a total of 39 League One and nine cup games for the "Shakers", mainly playing in central midfield during the 2015–16 season and was offered a new contract on reduced terms in April 2016, but elected to leave Gigg Lane.

=== Blackpool ===
He signed a one-year contract with EFL League Two side Blackpool in July 2016. Manager Gary Bowyer was reported to have signed Pugh to play in central midfield and to pass on experience to the younger players. Bowyer went on to appointed Pugh as club captain, saying that he had shown himself to be a "great example for everybody". He played 23 games in the first half of the 2016–17 season, before leaving the club in January 2017 to join League One side Port Vale on a permanent deal until the end of the season.

=== Port Vale ===
Port Vale manager Michael Brown had played alongside Pugh at Leeds. Pugh signed a new one-year contract on 4 May, days after the club's relegation into League Two. In the second league game of the 2017–18 season, a 3–2 loss to Wycombe Wanderers on 12 August, he picked up a knee injury that saw him ruled out of action for three months. He was appointed as club captain by new "Valiants" manager Neil Aspin in October 2017. On 30 March, he went from hero to villain on the cusp of half-time as he scored the opening goal before getting sent off during a crucial 2–1 victory over relegation rivals Chesterfield at Vale Park. However, by this stage he had already played enough games to a trigger a one-year extension to his contract.

== Coaching career ==
On 18 September 2018, Pugh took on extra coaching duties at Port Vale following the departure of coach Gary Brabin. Neil Aspin resigned on 30 January 2019, and Pugh stepped in to serve as caretaker manager. John Askey was appointed as manager on 4 February, before Pugh had the chance to take charge of any first-team games. Pugh became a full-time coach upon the expiry of his playing contract at the end of the season, though did take the #14 shirt and sat on the bench following a midfield injury crisis in September 2019. Pugh again became caretaker manager following Askey's departure on 4 January 2021. Five days later he oversaw a 3–0 home win over Grimsby Town in his first game in management. On 18 January, he began self-isolating after testing positive for COVID-19. Club chairperson Carol Shanahan said that Pugh had been unlucky during his time in charge, missing Tom Pope and Devante Rodney to injury and having to self-isolate at home for two games. She confirmed that Pugh had not applied for the role permanently. He returned to the touchline in time to oversee a 5–1 victory over bottom-club Southend United. He reverted to his original coaching role once Darrell Clarke was appointed manager on 15 February. On 10 May 2021, Port Vale announced Pugh had left the club.

He was announced as a signing at Hanley Town three months later, a club managed by former teammate Carl Dickinson. He joined Leek Town as a first-team coach in September 2023. In July 2026, Pugh was appointed as a professional development coach with Stoke City U18s.

== Career statistics ==
=== Playing statistics ===
Appearances and goals by club, season and competition
Club	Season	League			FA Cup		League Cup		Other^{[A]}		Total	
Club	Season	Division	Apps	Goals	Apps	Goals	Apps	Goals	Apps	Goals	Apps	Goals
Manchester United	2002–03	Premier League	1	0	0	0	1	0	3 (Note: Appearance(s) in the UEFA Champions League.)	0	5	0
Manchester United	2003–04	Premier League	0	0	1	0	1	0	0	0	2	0
Manchester United	Total		1	0	1	0	2	0	3	0	7	0
Leeds United	2004–05	Championship	38	5	1	0	3	1	—		42	6
Leeds United	2005–06	Championship	12	0	0	0	3	0	—		15	0
Leeds United	Total		50	5	1	0	6	1	0	0	57	6
Preston North End	2006–07	Championship	45	4	3	0	1	0	—		49	4
Preston North End	2007–08	Championship	7	0	0	0	1	1	—		8	1
Preston North End	Total		52	4	3	0	2	1	0	0	57	5
Stoke City	2007–08	Championship	30	0	2	0	—		—		32	0
Stoke City	2008–09	Premier League	17	0	0	0	3	1	—		20	1
Stoke City	2009–10	Premier League	7	1	3	0	3	0	—		13	1
Stoke City	2010–11	Premier League	10	0	5	0	3	0	—		18	0
Stoke City	2011–12	Premier League	3	0	0	0	0	0	3 (Note: Appearance(s) in the UEFA Europa League.)	1	6	1
Stoke City	Total		67	1	10	0	9	1	3	1	89	3
Preston North End (loan)	2010–11	Championship	5	0	0	0	—		—		5	0
Leeds United	2011–12	Championship	34	2	1	0	—		—		35	2
Leeds United	2012–13	Championship	4	0	0	0	2	0	—		6	0
Leeds United	2013–14	Championship	20	2	1	0	0	0	—		22	2
Leeds United	Total		58	4	2	0	2	0	0	0	62	4
Sheffield Wednesday (loan)	2012–13	Championship	16	1	—		—		—		16	1
Coventry City	2014–15	League One	5	0	0	0	1	0	1 (Note: Appearance(s) in the Football League Trophy / EFL Trophy.)	0	7	0
Bury	2015–16	League One	39	0	5	0	2	0	2	0	48	0
Blackpool	2016–17	League Two	18	0	4	0	0	0	1	0	23	0
Port Vale	2016–17	League One	14	0	—		—		—		14	0
Port Vale	2017–18	League Two	33	2	2	0	1	0	2	0	38	2
Port Vale	2018–19	League Two	1	0	0	0	0	0	3	1	4	1
Port Vale	2019–20	League Two	0	0	0	0	0	0	0	0	0	0
Port Vale	Total		48	2	2	0	1	0	5	1	56	3
Hanley Town	2021–22	Midland League; Premier Division	9	1	4	1	—		1 (Note: One appearance in FA Vase)	0	14	2
Career total			368	18	32	1	25	3	16	2	441	24

=== Managerial statistics ===
As of match played 6 February 2021

Managerial record by team and tenure
Team	From	To	Record				
Team	From	To	G	W	D	L	Win %
Port Vale (caretaker)	30 January 2019	4 February 2019	0	0	0	0	—
Port Vale (caretaker)	4 January 2021	15 February 2021	7	2	1	4	28.57
Total			7	2	1	4	28.6

== Honours ==
Stoke City

- Football League Championship second-place promotion: 2007–08
- FA Cup runner-up: 2010–11
