= Rob Hulse =

English footballer

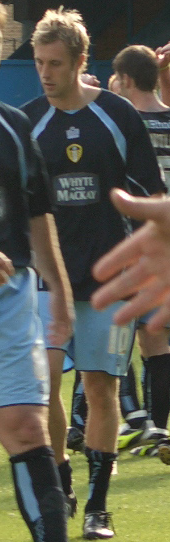
- Hulse with Leeds United in 2005

Personal information
- Full name: Robert William Hulse
- Date of birth: 25 October 1979 (age 47)
- Place of birth: Crewe, England
- Height: 1.87 m (6 ft 2 in)
- Position: Striker

Youth career
- 1989–1998: Crewe Alexandra

Senior career*
Years	Team	Apps	(Gls)
1998–2003	Crewe Alexandra	116	(45)
1999–2000	→ Hyde United (loan)	8	(9)
2003–2005	West Bromwich Albion	38	(10)
2005	→ Leeds United (loan)	13	(6)
2005–2006	Leeds United	39	(12)
2006–2008	Sheffield United	50	(8)
2008–2010	Derby County	82	(28)
2010–2013	Queens Park Rangers	23	(2)
2012–2013	→ Charlton Athletic (loan)	15	(3)
2013	→ Millwall (loan)	11	(0)
Total		395	(123)
- * Club domestic league appearances and goals

Robert William Hulse (born 25 October 1979) is an English former footballer who played as a striker.

He had primarily spent his career at second tier level, playing there with Crewe Alexandra, West Bromwich Albion, Leeds United, Sheffield United, Derby County, Queens Park Rangers and Charlton Athletic. He has won promotion on three occasions twice to the top flight and had his most notable spell in the Premier League with Sheffield United, where he finished as the club's top scorer in the 2006–07 season, despite his season finishing early due to injury. He scored his 100th career league goal with a penalty against Sheffield Wednesday for Derby on 3 October 2009. Hulse was a part of QPR's Championship winning team in the 2010–11 season.

== Career ==
=== Crewe Alexandra ===
Born in Crewe, Cheshire, Hulse began his career at Crewe Alexandra, having been part of the club's youth system since he was nine years old. A sudden spurt in height during his late teens left Hulse with a serious back injury, sidelining him for 12 months. When Hulse returned to fitness, he was given a three-month loan to then-Northern Premier League side Hyde United, where he scored 9 goals in 11 appearances during the 1999–2000 season. The successful loan spell led to Hulse's first team debut for Crewe, in their 1–0 win over Norwich City. It took Hulse a further three appearances to score his first goal for the club, which was in the club's 2–0 away win over Barnsley.

Hulse quickly became a fans' favourite at Crewe, thanks to his high work-rate and finishing the 2000–01 and 2001–02 seasons as the club's top goalscorer with 11 and 12 goals respectively. The club were relegated at the end of the 2001–02 season, but Hulse, along with Dean Ashton and Rodney Jack, proved to be too much for fellow Division Two defences to handle in 2002–03. Hulse finished as the club's top goalscorer for the third season in succession, scoring 23 goals. His performances during the season earned him the club's Player of the Year award, as well as appearing in the PFA Division Two Team of the Year.

Despite Crewe's promotion back to Division One, Hulse rejected a new contract and manager Dario Gradi decided to sell him instead of letting him go on a Bosman. A whole host of clubs were interested in Hulse. Fellow promoted club Cardiff City were close to signing Hulse for a fee believed to be in a region of £750,000, but Hulse did not wish to sign for the Blue Birds.

=== West Bromwich Albion ===
West Bromwich Albion signed Hulse for a fee of £750,000. He made his debut for West Brom in their 4–1 opening day defeat at Walsall, and scored his first goal for the club in a 4–0 home win over Brentford in the League Cup 1st Round. Hulse played a prominent role in the first team before suffering a stomach issue during the Christmas period. He scored two goals in a 4-3 win against West Ham at the Boleyn Ground in November, which saw Albion come back from 3-0 down. After recovering from this injury, Hulse made a further 19 appearances and finished the season as the club's top scorer in all competitions with 13 goals, helping Albion secure promotion back to the Premier League.

Despite his influential role in the previous year's promotion campaign, Hulse was given little chance to prove himself in the top flight and was largely kept out of the first team by summer signings Robert Earnshaw and Nwankwo Kanu. Hulse only played seven games for West Brom during the 2004–05 season, scoring no goals.

=== Leeds United ===
Having played a relatively small number of games in comparison to his fellow strikers at West Brom, Hulse decided to join Leeds United on loan for the final three months of the 2004–05 campaign instead of a £1.2 million switch to Stoke City. His debut was spectacular, scoring two individual goals struck from outside the box against Reading.

The success of the loan spell led to a £1.1 million transfer to Leeds. Hulse scored 20 goals in 51 games. He was the club's top scorer with 14 goals in the 2005–06 season despite being in competition with several forwards including Robbie Blake, David Healy and Richard Cresswell for a place in the side as well as playing with an ankle injury during the start of the season.

=== Sheffield United ===
With Leeds failing to gain promotion to the FA Premier League, Hulse's ambition led elsewhere and in July 2006, Leeds accepted a bid of £2.2 million from Sheffield United although the fee could have risen to £3 million, beating Norwich to Hulse's signature. Hulse scored on his debut for the club against Liverpool; scoring the first goal of the 2006–07 FA Premier League season, although Liverpool managed to equalise through a Robbie Fowler penalty. He went on to be the club's top scorer for the season, netting regularly until March.

On 17 March, Hulse and Chelsea goalkeeper Petr Čech challenged for the ball in a league game at Stamford Bridge, resulting in a horrific injury. Hulse almost turned in a low Keith Gillespie cross but Čech raced out to smother his effort and in the collision Hulse's ankle appeared to snap beneath him. After a five-minute delay Hulse was carried off on a stretcher and taken to hospital with what was thought to be a double fracture. On 20 March, it was confirmed that Hulse had fractured his left leg in two places, for which he underwent surgery. His season over, he still finished up as United's top scorer in the Premier League with eight league goals.

Hulse eventually returned to the first team in December 2007 after 9 months out, but despite making 24 appearances for the Blades over the course of that season he was unable to find full fitness and failed to score a goal ending his Blades career on a disappointing note.

=== Derby County ===
Following the end of the 2007–08 season, Hulse was strongly linked with a move away to United's Championship rivals Derby County. The deal was completed on 21 July 2008 for £1.75 million. Five days later he scored on his unofficial debut for the club, a friendly match, against Mansfield Town. Hulse made his competitive debut in a 1–0 home defeat to Doncaster Rovers on the opening day of the 2008–09 season. His first league goal for Derby was the winner in a 2–1 victory over his former club Sheffield United in September 2008. Hulse's form during October 2008, when he hit four goals in five games, saw him awarded the Championship Player of the Month award. Hulse's goal against Charlton secured Derby's Championship status in the final home game of the season. On the final day of the season, he played 90 minutes in an unfamiliar central defensive position. Hulse won the Derby County Supporters' Player of the Year award, the Players' Player of the Year Trophy and finished the season as the club's top goalscorer, with 15 league goals, and 3 more in the FA Cup.

After a successful first season, Hulse was continually linked with a £3 million move to Derby's Championship rivals Middlesbrough. Derby accepted a bid of £4 million on the final day of the 2009 summer transfer Window, but Hulse rejected the move, citing his fondness for club as the reason. Injury disrupted the early part of the season, with Hulse not grabbing his first goal of the season until 15 November in a 3–2 home defeat to Barnsley before scoring his 100th league career goal with a 90th-minute penalty in a 3–0 win over Sheffield Wednesday and earning a place in the Championship Team of the Week. Hulse earned his second Team of the Week slot after scoring two goals in a 2–1 win over Coventry City on 7 November 2009 before hitting the winner against relegation rivals Reading on 28 November 2009 to take his tally to six for the season. However, this proved to be his last goal for two months as injury saw him dropped to the bench.

The January transfer window saw Hulse again linked with moves away from the club, with Wolverhampton Wanderers interested to the tune of £3 million, but the only concrete moves came in the form of loan bids from Premier League Burnley and Stoke City, both of which were rejected. Hulse reclaimed his place in the team towards the end of January 2010 and scored a 78th-minute winner against Nottingham Forest in the 85th East Midlands derby to end Forest's 19 match unbeaten run. This sparked a run of form for Hulse, who netted three times in his next three matches, scoring the first in a 3–0 win over league leaders Newcastle United and netting a double in a 5–3 victory over Preston North End, taking his tally to 10 for the season. A combination of injuries and Derby's struggling form saw Hulse grab just two more goals before surgery ruled him out for the remainder of the campaign. His finishing total of 12 goals saw him finish as Derby's top scorer for the second consecutive campaign.

Entering the final year of his contract, and with cost-cutting Derby unwilling to match his current contract, Burnley and Queens Park Rangers both made official enquiries about Hulse, whom Derby valued at £1.5 million. Leeds United also expressed an interest in re-signing Hulse, with Derby coach Gary Crosby stating "As much as we'd like to keep Rob, financially, we will maybe look to sell him." However, CEO Tom Glick later dismissed any financial need to sell the striker. He was later linked with a possible return to the top flight with a £1 million move to newly promoted Blackpool, though his wage was suggested to be a stumbling block. Despite speculation over his future, Hulse played a part in Derby's pre-season fixtures and scored in a 1–1 draw with Southend United. Hulse started the 2010–11 campaign with the opening goal in a 2–1 victory at previous club Leeds United but was again consistently linked with a move away from the club, this time to Cardiff City, this time with the possibility of a cash-plus-Ross McCormack deal (although McCormack later joined Leeds United) and Queens Park Rangers.

=== Queens Park Rangers ===
On 31 August 2010, Derby accepted a bid from Queens Park Rangers for an undisclosed fee, which was speculated be in the region of £500,000. the transfer however didn't go through until 3 September 2010, due to issues over the timing of paper work ahead of the 18:00 hrs deadline. Hulse rejoined manager Neil Warnock who he played under at Sheffield United. Hulse made his QPR debut on 22 October 2010 in a 1–1 draw at Bristol City, his debut was delayed due to an achilles tendon injury. Hulse played 22 times, during the 2010–11 season, scoring twice as QPR won the Championship title and secured a return to the top flight for the first time in the club's history since the 1995–96 season.

In June 2011, ahead of the 2011–12 season, Hulse turned down a loan move to Millwall, stating a desire to break into the QPR first team. However he was then left out of Queens Park Rangers 25-man squad for the Premier League season 2011–12 by Neil Warnock and in November 2011 was linked with a loan moves to Championship clubs Doncaster Rovers, Blackpool, however Hulse stayed at Rangers and after Warnock was sacked in January 2012, Mark Hughes the new manager chose Rob Hulse to be in a 25-man squad. Hulse made his first appearance of the season, against Aston Villa. Hulse made two further appearances once in the FA Cup and once more in the Premier League.

Hulse was not given a squad number for the 2012–13 season and was told he was available for transfer as he was left out of the pre-season tour to Asia, Hulse said he'd let his contract run, which expires in June 2013. Despite this, Hulse joined fellow London side Charlton Athletic on loan for three months on 1 October 2012. Hulse played 15 times for Charlton, with 10 starts and 3 goals. After returning to QPR in January, he went out on loan again on 29 January 2013, to another Championship club in Millwall until the end of the season. His loan at Millwall was cut short on 26 April. He announced his retirement from football in October 2013, with the intention to move into physiotherapy.

== After football ==
He studied for a physiotherapy degree at the University of Salford, graduating in summer 2017, and took a job at Russells Hall Hospital in Dudley.

== Career statistics ==
Appearances and goals by club, season and competition
Club	Season	League			FA Cup		League Cup		Other		Total	
Club	Season	Division	Apps	Goals	Apps	Goals	Apps	Goals	Apps	Goals	Apps	Goals
Crewe Alexandra	1999–2000	First Division	4	1	0	0	0	0	—		4	1
Crewe Alexandra	2000–01	First Division	33	11	2	0	3	0	—		38	11
Crewe Alexandra	2001–02	First Division	41	11	3	0	3	1	—		47	12
Crewe Alexandra	2002–03	Second Division	38	22	1	0	1	1	2 (Note: Appearance(s) in Football League Trophy)	4	42	27
Crewe Alexandra	Total		116	45	6	0	7	2	2	4	131	51
Hyde United (loan)	1999–2000	Northern Premier League Premier Division	8	9	0	0	—		3 (Note: Two appearance(s) in FA Trophy, one appearance in Northern Premier League Challenge Cup)	0	11	9
West Bromwich Albion	2003–04	First Division	33	10	1	0	5	3	—		39	13
West Bromwich Albion	2004–05	Premier League	5	0	1	0	1	0	—		7	0
West Bromwich Albion	Total		38	10	2	0	6	3	—		46	13
Leeds United	2004–05	Championship	13	6	0	0	0	0	—		13	6
Leeds United	2005–06	Championship	39	12	2	1	2	0	3 (Note: Appearance(s) in Championship play-offs)	1	46	14
Leeds United	Total		52	18	2	1	2	0	3	1	59	20
Sheffield United	2006–07	Premier League	29	8	0	0	0	0	—		29	8
Sheffield United	2007–08	Championship	21	0	3	0	0	0	—		24	0
Sheffield United	Total		50	8	3	0	0	0	—		53	8
Derby County	2008–09	Championship	44	15	4	3	6	0	—		54	18
Derby County	2009–10	Championship	37	12	3	0	0	0	—		40	12
Derby County	2010–11	Championship	1	1	0	0	1	0	—		2	1
Derby County	Total		82	28	7	3	7	0	—		96	31
Queens Park Rangers	2010–11	Championship	21	2	1	0	0	0	—		22	2
Queens Park Rangers	2011–12	Premier League	2	0	1	0	0	0	—		3	0
Queens Park Rangers	2012–13	Premier League	0	0	0	0	0	0	—		0	0
Queens Park Rangers	Total		23	2	2	0	0	0	—		25	2
Charlton Athletic (loan)	2012–13	Championship	15	3	0	0	0	0	—		15	3
Millwall (loan)	2012–13	Championship	11	0	4	1	0	0	—		15	1
Career total			395	123	26	5	22	5	8	5	451	138

== Honours ==
Queens Park Rangers

- Football League Championship: 2010–11

Individual

- PFA Team of the Year: 2002–03 Second Division
- Crewe Alexandra Player of the Year: 2002–03
- Leeds United Supporters' Player of the Year: 2005–06
- Sheffield United Player of The Year: 2006–07
- Football League Championship Player of the Month: October 2007
- Derby County Player of the Year: 2008–09

Awards and achievements
Preceded by Kenny Miller	Derby County top goalscorer 2008–09, 2009–10	Succeeded by Kris Commons
