= Shaun Derry =

English footballer (born 1977)

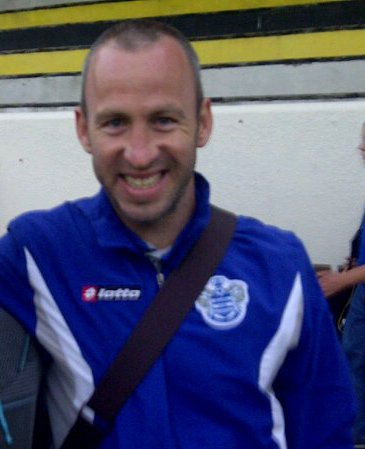
- Derry with Queens Park Rangers in 2011

Personal information
- Full name: Shaun Peter Derry
- Date of birth: 6 December 1977 (age 48)
- Place of birth: Nottingham, England
- Height: 1.86 m (6 ft 1 in)
- Position: Midfielder

Senior career*
Years	Team	Apps	(Gls)
1995–1998	Notts County	82	(4)
1998–2000	Sheffield United	72	(0)
2000–2002	Portsmouth	49	(1)
2002–2005	Crystal Palace	83	(3)
2004–2005	→ Nottingham Forest (loan)	7	(0)
2005–2008	Leeds United	71	(3)
2007–2008	→ Crystal Palace (loan)	30	(0)
2008–2010	Crystal Palace	85	(0)
2010–2013	Queens Park Rangers	92	(1)
2013	→ Millwall (loan)	7	(0)
2014–2015	Notts County	0	(0)
Total		578	(12)

Managerial career
- 2013–2015: Notts County
- 2015–2018: Cambridge United
- * Club domestic league appearances and goals

Shaun Peter Derry (born 6 December 1977) is an English former professional footballer and manager.

He previously managed Notts County and Cambridge United, and played for Crystal Palace, Leeds United and Queens Park Rangers among other clubs. Derry was known for his hard-tackling and aggressive midfield style, and was primarily a defensive midfielder but could also play at right-back.

== Playing career ==
=== Early career ===
Born in Nottingham, Derry started his career at Notts County as a trainee before being bought by Sheffield United in 1998 for a fee of £700,000. He scored once during his spell at Sheffield United, his goal coming in the FA Cup against Rushden & Diamonds.

=== Portsmouth ===
Derry was sold to Portsmouth in 2000 for £300,000. He was a regular in the side under both Tony Pulis and Steve Claridge before being made team captain by Graham Rix. After Rix's departure, Derry was amongst the many players deemed surplus to requirements by new manager Harry Redknapp in summer 2002 rebuilding and was sold to Crystal Palace for £400,001. He scored only once during his spell at Portsmouth, his goal coming in a crucial win over against West Bromwich Albion.

=== Crystal Palace ===
Derry helped Crystal Palace in their return to the Premier League in 2004, making 44 appearances including an appearance in the 2004 First Division play-off final. It was his corner that led to Darren Powell scoring a 90th-minute header to send the Eagles to extra-time in the semi-final, which they would win on penalties. He struggled to get into the team during the 2004–05 season and, after a loan spell at Nottingham Forest, Leeds signed him for an undisclosed amount in February 2005.

=== Leeds United ===
Derry's first goal for Leeds United came on his home debut against West Ham United, sealing a 2–1 victory against the Hammers. Derry was a regular in the Leeds starting eleven in season 2005–06, becoming a vital part of the squad as they pushed for promotion back into the Premier League and a cult hero with the Leeds fans for his passionate displays. Derry was part of the Leeds team which reached the Championship Playoff finals, but Leeds ended up on the wrong end of a 3–0 defeat to confine them to another season in the Championship. In August 2006 he pledged his future to the club, signing a contract extension until July 2009.

Leeds' manager Kevin Blackwell was sacked after a poor start to the 2006–07 season. In October 2006, new Leeds manager Dennis Wise revealed Derry as the new vice captain of the club, with Kevin Nicholls made captain. Derry was once again a regular in the Leeds team in the 2006–07 season. A hernia and Achilles tendon injury in January 2007 saw Derry being ruled out for the rest of the season. Derry's fitness returned the following season as Leeds prepared for life in League One. However, he did not feature for the club again and returned to former club Palace on loan in November 2007.

=== Return to Crystal Palace ===
Further doubts about the midfielder's future at the Elland Road club arose when it was reported that Derry had declined Wise's offer to return and feature in the home tie against Oldham Athletic on New Year's Day 2008 with Leeds' missing midfielders due to injuries. It was later revealed that it was actually manager Neil Warnock who blocked Derry's return to Leeds rather than Derry himself.

Shortly after his loan spell concluded, Derry made his move back to Palace a permanent one, signing for the club on a three-year deal. for £150,000.

In his second season back at the club he was named club captain after the departure of former captain Mark Hudson to Charlton. He held the position for the next two seasons.

In the 2009–10 season, Derry played every minute of every match for Crystal Palace. The season was an eventful one during which Palace were placed into administration, leading to the departure of Neil Warnock to Queens Park Rangers and a fight to avoid relegation to League One. This was finally achieved on the last day of the season, 2 May 2010 after an away 2–2 draw against Sheffield Wednesday.

=== Queens Park Rangers ===
Derry departed from Selhurst Park at the end of the season to reunite with Warnock at his new club Queens Park Rangers signing a two-year contract, on a free transfer, after his contract at Palace had expired. On 21 March 2012 Derry scored his first league goal for the club, and his only in the Premier League, in the 3–2 win over Liverpool. Derry, alongside his former Crystal Palace teammate Clint Hill, won much respect from QPR fans for his tireless work ethic and leadership on the pitch throughout the Championship title-winning season and the subsequent 2 years in the Premier League. Derry was told by his manager that his crosses reminded him of the great Spanish footballer, Xabi Alonso, with their precision, and power.

On 21 January 2013, Derry signed a one-year contract extension with QPR, keeping him at the club until 2014. On 8 August 2013, Derry joined Millwall on a 28-day loan.

== Coaching career ==
=== Notts County ===
Derry was appointed manager at Notts County on 6 November 2013. Despite looking destined for relegation, Derry secured Notts's League One status with six wins from the last nine games, a draw on last day of season kept County up by three points. He was sacked on 23 March 2015 with Notts County one place above the relegation positions in League One on goal difference and having won only three games in their previous 24 league matches.

=== Cambridge United ===
Derry was appointed manager of League Two club Cambridge United on 12 November 2015. On 9 February 2018, following a poor run of form, Derry left the club by mutual consent.

=== Oxford United ===
In June 2018, Oxford United announced Derry's appointment as first-team coach, under manager Karl Robinson. Derry played, and scored a penalty, during a pre-season friendly victory over Irish club Longford Town in July 2018.

=== Crystal Palace ===
In September 2019, Derry returned to Crystal Palace as professional development coach in the club's academy system.

Derry was promoted to first team coach under manager Patrick Vieira, but left this role in January 2023.

=== Wolverhampton Wanderers ===
Derry joined Wolverhampton Wanderers in August 2023 as a first-team coach, forming part of Gary O'Neil's coaching team. Derry was sacked alongside O'Neil on 15 December 2024.

== Personal life ==
Derry has a son, Jesse, who plays as a forward for Sporting CP on loan from Chelsea F.C. and is an England under-19 international.

In 2025, Shaun Derry joined The Football Show on SiriusXM FC as a host and presenter along with Thomas J Rennie, Jack Collins, and Adrian Heath with Tim Horsey and Big John as the producers.

== Career statistics ==
Appearances and goals by club, season and competition
Club	Season	League			FA Cup		League Cup		Other		Total	
Club	Season	Division	Apps	Goals	Apps	Goals	Apps	Goals	Apps	Goals	Apps	Goals
Notts County	1995–96	Second Division	15	0	0	0	0	0	–		15	0
Notts County	1996–97	Second Division	39	2	3	0	2	0	–		44	2
Notts County	1997–98	Third Division	28	2	3	1	3	0	–		34	3
Notts County	Total		82	4	6	1	5	0	0	0	93	5
Sheffield United	1997–98	First Division	12	0	0	0	0	0	–		12	0
Sheffield United	1998–99	First Division	26	0	4	0	0	0	–		30	0
Sheffield United	1999–2000	First Division	34	0	3	1	4	0	–		41	1
Sheffield United	Total		72	0	7	1	4	0	0	0	83	1
Portsmouth	1999–2000	First Division	9	1	0	0	0	0	–		9	1
Portsmouth	2000–01	First Division	28	0	1	0	4	0	–		33	0
Portsmouth	2001–02	First Division	12	0	1	0	0	0	–		13	0
Portsmouth	Total		49	1	2	0	4	0	0	0	55	1
Crystal Palace	2002–03	First Division	39	1	4	0	2	0	–		45	1
Crystal Palace	2003–04	First Division	37	2	0	0	4	0	3	0	44	2
Crystal Palace	2004–05	Premier League	7	0	0	0	3	0	–		10	0
Crystal Palace	Total		83	3	4	0	9	0	3	0	99	3
Nottingham Forest (loan)	2004–05	Championship	7	0	1	0	0	0	–		8	0
Leeds United	2004–05	Championship	7	2	0	0	0	0	-		7	2
Leeds United	2005–06	Championship	41	0	1	0	1	0	3	0	46	0
Leeds United	2006–07	Championship	23	1	1	0	1	0	–		25	1
Leeds United	Total		71	3	2	0	2	0	3	0	78	3
Crystal Palace (loan)	2007–08	Championship	30	0	0	0	0	0	2	0	32	0
Crystal Palace	2008–09	Championship	39	0	2	0	1	0	–		42	0
Crystal Palace	2009–10	Championship	46	0	5	0	2	0	–		53	0
Crystal Palace	Total		115	0	7	0	3	0	2	0	127	0
Queens Park Rangers	2010–11	Championship	45	0	1	0	1	0	-		47	0
Queens Park Rangers	2011–12	Premier League	29	1	2	0	1	0	-		32	1
Queens Park Rangers	2012–13	Premier League	18	0	1	0	0	0	–		19	0
Queens Park Rangers	2013–14	Championship	0	0	0	0	1	0	–		1	0
Queens Park Rangers	Total		92	1	4	0	3	0	0	0	99	1
Millwall (loan)	2013–14	Championship	7	0	0	0	0	0	–		7	0
Career total			578	12	27	2	30	0	8	0	649	14

== Managerial statistics ==
As of match played 9 February 2018

Managerial record by team and tenure
Team	From	To	Record					Ref
Team	From	To	P	W	D	L	Win %	Ref
Notts County	6 November 2013	23 March 2015	77	26	14	37	33.8	
Cambridge United	12 November 2015	9 February 2018	124	48	29	47	38.7	
Total			201	74	43	84	36.8	—

== Honours ==
=== As a player ===
Notts County

- Football League Third Division: 1997–98

Crystal Palace

- Football League First Division play-offs: 2004

Queens Park Rangers

- Football League Championship: 2010–11

=== As a manager ===
Individual

- Football League Two Manager of the Month: December 2015

Sporting positions
Preceded by Mark Hudson	Captain of Crystal Palace; 2008–2010	Succeeded by Paddy McCarthy
