= Stephen Crainey =

Scottish footballer (born 1981)

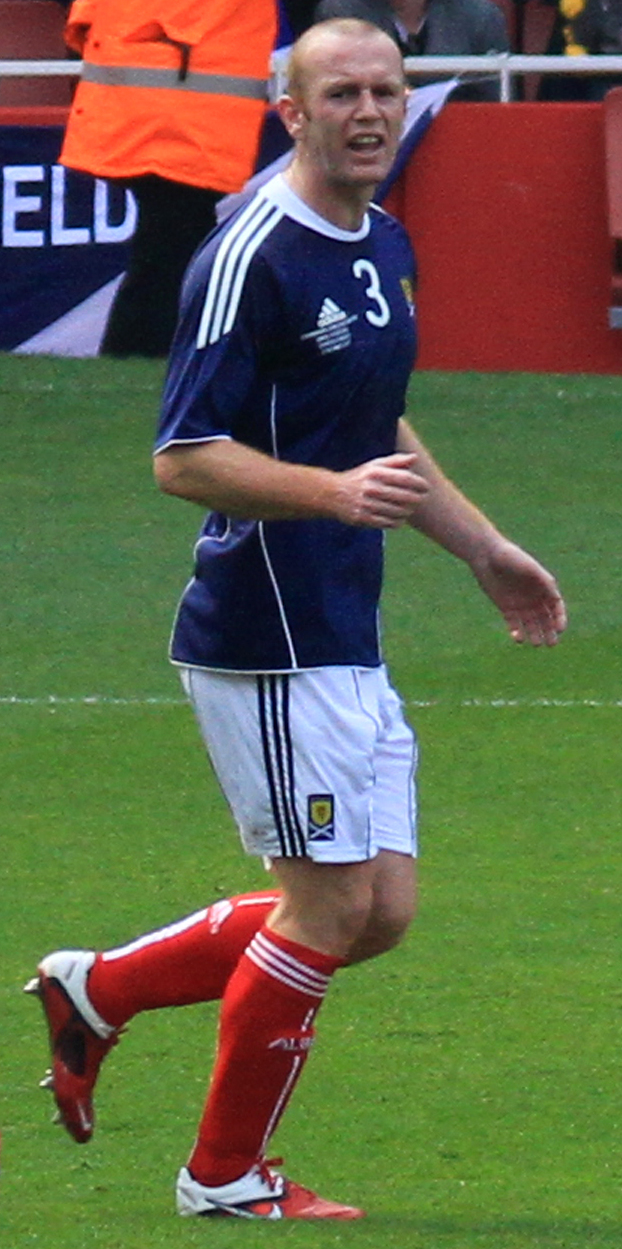
- Crainey in 2011

Personal information
- Full name: Stephen Daniel Crainey
- Date of birth: 22 June 1981 (age 45)
- Place of birth: Glasgow, Scotland
- Height: 1.75 m (5 ft 9 in)
- Position: Left back

Youth career
- Lenzie Youth Club
- –1997: Celtic

Senior career*
Years	Team	Apps	(Gls)
1997–2004	Celtic	41	(0)
2004	Southampton	5	(0)
2004–2007	Leeds United	52	(0)
2007–2013	Blackpool	214	(4)
2013–2014	Wigan Athletic	20	(0)
2014–2015	Fleetwood Town	28	(0)
2015–2016	AFC Fylde	24	(1)
Total		384	(5)

International career
2001–2002	Scotland U21	7	(0)
2002–2011	Scotland	12	(0)

Managerial career
- 2021–2022: Fleetwood Town
- * Club domestic league appearances and goals

Stephen Daniel Crainey (born 22 June 1981) is a Scottish former professional footballer who is assistant head coach at Blackpool.

A left back, he made 319 appearances in the Premier League and Football League, including 214 for Blackpool. In his 18-year-long playing career, Crainey has also previously played for Celtic, Southampton, Leeds United, and Wigan Athletic and Fleetwood Town. He joined AFC Fylde in December 2015 for a brief spell.

He also played for the Scotland national team on twelve occasions.

== Club career ==
=== Early career ===
Born in Glasgow, Crainey started his professional career with Celtic in 1997. He made a total of 58 appearances for the Hoops. He scored one goal when Celtic beat Hearts 5–2 in the quarter-final of the 2000–01 Scottish League Cup. On 18 March 2001 he helped Celtic win the League Cup at Hampden Park when they beat Kilmarnock 3–0 in the Final. He then made 15 appearances as Celtic won the 2001–02 Scottish Premier League championship.

Crainey started the 2003–04 season with Celtic, but on 6 February 2004 he moved to England when he signed for Premier League side Southampton. He made his debut four days later as the Saints lost 2–0 away to Arsenal. However, he was to make a total of just five Premier League appearances for Southampton.

=== Leeds United ===
On 6 August 2004, he joined Football League Championship side Leeds United, initially on loan before the move was made permanent four days later for a fee of £200,000. This was Leeds United's first cash signing since relegation from the Premier League in May 2004. He made his debut on 14 August in a 0–0 draw with Wolverhampton Wanderers at Molineux. He made a total of 11 appearances in the 2004–05 season. The following season he played a total of 30 games as Leeds United reached the Play-offs. However, Crainey was sent off in the 68th minute in the second leg of the semi-final, as the Whites beat Preston North End to reach the final, which they then lost 3–0 to Watford.

Crainey was a regular at the start of the 2006–07 campaign under former manager Kevin Blackwell, but played less following Blackwell's departure on 20 September 2006. Crainey featured in the heavy defeats that quickly ended John Carver's hopes of becoming the permanent Leeds manager. When new boss Dennis Wise took over, he dropped Crainey in favour of Eddie Lewis and, later, other options at left back. Crainey later regained his place, but then was dropped again before suffering an injury.

Crainey's recovery coincided with the return to fitness of loan player Robbie Elliott who was regarded as Dennis Wise's first choice left-back. Elliott featured on the bench for the game against Leicester City on 13 March 2007, in his first outing since returning from injury, but Crainey was not even included in the squad as Wise chose to start Armando Sá in that role. His last appearance was on 30 January 2007, in a 2–1 win over Hull City. Crainey was eventually released at the end of his Leeds contract on 15 May 2007 as the Whites were relegated to League One.

=== Blackpool ===
On 9 July 2007, Crainey signed for Blackpool in a one-year deal with an option for a further year. On 13 August 2007, he was named in the Press Association's Championship "Team of the Week". Crainey scored his first-ever league goal on 19 September 2007, in a 2–2 draw with Bryan Robson's Sheffield United at Bloomfield Road. On 3 December 2007, he was again named in the Press Association's Championship "Team of the Week". Crainey was also named in the Press Association's Championship "Team of the Week" on 4 February 2008. He made a total of 43 appearances (scoring one League goal) in the 2007–08 season as the Seasiders finished nineteenth in the Championship, the club's highest-place finish in the Football League in 27 years.

In June 2008 newspaper reports linked Crainey with a £250,000 move to fellow Championship club Burnley, but he instead signed a new contract with Blackpool. He missed the start of the 2008–09 season with a groin injury and Blackpool brought in Mohammed Camara on loan to cover for him. On 9 September the club confirmed that Crainey had undergone an operation the day before which would keep him out of action for a further four to six weeks. He made his comeback on 24 January 2009 as an 87th-minute substitute in a 2–0 win over Birmingham City at Bloomfield Road. That season he made a total of 17 appearances.

Crainey was named in the Championship "Team of the Week", along with teammates Matthew Gilks and Marcel Seip, following his performance in Blackpool's 0–0 draw with Swansea City on 24 October at the Liberty Stadium.

On 22 January 2011, in a home defeat to Sunderland, Crainey suffered an ankle injury that saw him miss part of Blackpool's debut season in the Premier League. With Blackpool relegated back to the Championship, Crainey put pen to paper on a new two-year contract, Blackpool putting in a 'big offer' to help Crainey snub the interest of Premier League side Wigan Athletic.

On 26 November 2011, Crainey scored his second League goal for Blackpool in a draw against Birmingham City at Bloomfield Road. On 11 February 2012, Crainey scored his third League goal for Blackpool in a draw against Portsmouth with a free kick into the top right hand corner. At the end of the 2012–13 season, Crainey rejected a new contract from Blackpool.

=== Later career ===
Crainey signed a one-year deal with Wigan Athletic in June 2013. He left the club at the end of June 2014 when his contract expired. He then signed for Fleetwood Town. After leaving Fleetwood, Crainey trained with Barnsley before signing for National League North club AFC Fylde in December 2015 for a short spell. Crainey retired from playing in 2016.

== International career ==
Crainey was capped by Scotland at under-21 level, then made his full international debut for Scotland on 27 March 2002 as they lost a friendly 5–0 to France at the Stade de France in Paris. He made a total of four appearances for Scotland in 2002, playing in the 1–2 friendly defeat to Nigeria at Pittodrie Stadium, Aberdeen on 17 April and another friendly defeat on 21 August, 0–1 to Denmark at Hampden Park, Glasgow. He then made his competitive debut in the UEFA Euro 2004 qualifying Group 5 2–2 draw with the Faroe Islands at Svangaskarð, Toftir on 7 September. His next international appearances came in 2004 in two more friendly defeats. On 31 March, 1–2 to Romania at Hampden Park and 0–1 to Denmark on 28 April at Parken Stadium, Copenhagen.

On 16 November 2010 Crainey made a return to the Scotland set up under Craig Levein for a friendly against the Faroe Islands at Pittodrie to claim his seventh cap.

== Coaching career ==
After his retirement from playing in 2016, Crainey rejoined Fleetwood Town as a youth team coach. He became their first team caretaker manager on 21 November 2021, and a month later he was appointed manager until the end of the 2021–22 season. Despite a 4–2 defeat to Bolton Wanderers on the final day of the season, Fleetwood survived relegation on goal difference. He returned to his U-23's team role on 4 May 2022.

Crainey moved to Wigan Athletic in November 2022, becoming a youth team coach.

Crainey was appointed as joint assistant manager at Bolton Wanderers in June 2024, joining existing assistant Peter Atherton. On 22 January 2025, manager Ian Evatt left by mutual consent — with Crainey leaving his role as well.

After Evatt was appointed head coach at the pair's former club Blackpool, in October 2025, Crainey was brought in as his assistant.

== Career statistics ==
Appearances and goals by club, season and competition
Club	Season	League			National Cup		League Cup		Continental		Other		Total	
Club	Season	Division	Apps	Goals	Apps	Goals	Apps	Goals	Apps	Goals	Apps	Goals	Apps	Goals
Celtic	1999–2000	Scottish Premier League	9	0	0	0	0	0	—		0	0	9	0
Celtic	2000–01	Scottish Premier League	2	0	1	0	2	1	—		0	0	5	1
Celtic	2001–02	Scottish Premier League	15	0	2	0	1	0	1 (Note: Appearance(s) in UEFA Cup)	0	0	0	19	0
Celtic	2002–03	Scottish Premier League	13	0	2	0	2	0	2	0	0	0	19	0
Celtic	2003–04	Scottish Premier League	2	0	0	0	2	0	2 (Note: Appearance(s) in UEFA Champions League)	0	0	0	6	0
Celtic	Total		41	0	5	0	7	1	5	0	0	0	58	1
Southampton	2003–04	Premier League	5	0	0	0	0	0	—		0	0	5	0
Leeds United	2004–05	Championship	9	0	0	0	1	0	—		0	0	10	0
Leeds United	2005–06	Championship	24	0	2	0	2	0	—		2 (Note: Appearance(s) in Championship play-offs)	0	30	0
Leeds United	2006–07	Championship	19	0	0	0	3	0	—		0	0	22	0
Leeds United	Total		52	0	2	0	6	0	0	0	2	0	62	0
Blackpool	2007–08	Championship	40	1	1	0	2	0	—		0	0	43	1
Blackpool	2008–09	Championship	17	0	0	0	0	0	—		0	0	17	0
Blackpool	2009–10	Championship	41	0	1	0	1	0	—		3	0	46	0
Blackpool	2010–11	Premier League	31	0	0	0	0	0	—		0	0	31	0
Blackpool	2011–12	Championship	42	3	0	0	0	0	—		3	0	45	3
Blackpool	2012–13	Championship	43	0	2	0	1	0	—		0	0	46	0
Blackpool	Total		214	4	4	0	4	0	0	0	6	0	228	4
Wigan Athletic	2013–14	Championship	20	0	4	0	1	0	4 (Note: Appearance(s) in UEFA Europa League)	0	1 (Note: Appearance in 2013 FA Community Shield)	0	30	0
Fleetwood Town	2014–15	League One	28	0	1	0	0	0	—		1 (Note: Appearance(s) in Football League Trophy)	0	30	0
AFC Fylde	2015–16	National League North	24	1	0	0	—		—		2 (Note: Appearance(s) in FA Trophy)	0	26	1
Career total			384	5	16	0	18	1	9	0	12	0	439	6

== Honours ==
Blackpool

- Football League Championship play-offs: 2010

Individual

- Blackpool Player of the Season: 2007–08
