= Paul Butler (footballer, born 1972) =

Footballer (born 1972)

Personal information
- Full name: Paul John Butler
- Date of birth: 2 November 1972 (age 54)
- Place of birth: Moston, England
- Height: 6 ft 2 in (1.88 m)
- Position: Centre-back

Senior career*
Years	Team	Apps	(Gls)
1991–1996	Rochdale	158	(10)
1996–1998	Bury	84	(4)
1998–2001	Sunderland	79	(3)
2000–2001	→ Wolverhampton Wanderers (loan)	5	(0)
2001–2004	Wolverhampton Wanderers	119	(3)
2004–2007	Leeds United	99	(4)
2006–2007	→ Milton Keynes Dons (loan)	8	(0)
2007	Milton Keynes Dons	9	(0)
2007–2009	Chester City	35	(2)
Total		597	(26)

International career
2000	Republic of Ireland	1	(0)
- * Club domestic league appearances and goals

Paul John Butler (né Roberts; (born 2 November 1972) is a former professional footballer where he played as a centre-back. Born in England, he played for Republic of Ireland. He was most recently a player at League Two side Chester City, where he also had spells as captain and assistant-manager.

He has previously played in the Premier League for Sunderland and Wolverhampton Wanderers, and was also a former captain of Leeds United.

== Club career ==
Butler was born, in Moston, Manchester and began his professional career at Rochdale in 1991 and remained with the club for five seasons before joining Bury. Here, he won promotion to the second flight in his first season.

After one season in the second flight with Bury, he moved to Sunderland for £1 million and won the First Division championship in his first season. He featured through a full season in the Premier League in 1999–2000.

However, he found himself often left out of Sunderland's first team during the following season. To gain playing time, First Division Wolves took him on loan in late 2000, a move made permanent by incoming manager Dave Jones for £1 million in January 2001. He was made club captain for the following season which saw the team mount an automatic promotion challenge, only to fall away in the final weeks into the play-offs, where they lost to Norwich. The next year saw Butler win a second promotion to the top flight though, as the club won the play-offs, beating Sheffield United 3–0 in the 2003 final.

He remained with the club for their solitary season in the Premier League but could not agree terms of a new contract afterward and instead joined fellow-relegated side Leeds United in July 2004. He was a first choice centre-back during manager Kevin Blackwell's reign and was made captain shortly after signing. Leeds first season was one of consolidating, the following season The 2005–06 season saw the club almost regain their place in the top division but they lost the play-off final to Watford.

After some poor performances, loss of fitness and the sacking of manager Kevin Blackwell, new manager Dennis Wise decided to strip Butler of the captaincy after a fall out, and he was told he was free to leave Elland Road on loan until January then on a free transfer. He duly moved on loan to League Two Milton Keynes Dons in November 2006. After returning to his parent club, he was released from his contract with Leeds leaving under poor terms with Dennis Wise, and two days later signed a permanent contract with the Dons.

Butler failed to complete the season with the MK Dons though, leaving in March 2007 after only nine further appearances. He joined Chester City four months later and quickly struck up a strong central defensive partnership with Paul Linwood, later combining playing duties with a role on the coaching staff. But he was to rarely feature after April 2008, he fell out with Chester's manager after a poor performance against his former club Leeds United in the League Cup where Butler was substituted at half time, He never played for the club again and on 1 February 2009 he agreed a deal to leave Chester and become a free agent as he continued working towards completing his coaching qualifications.

== International career ==
Butler made his only appearance for the Republic of Ireland (for whom he is often incorrectly stated as having qualified via his Irish wife, when he in fact qualified through his step-father's father who was from Dublin), in a friendly against the Czech Republic on 23 February 2000. He was pitted against the big Czech striker Jan Koller, but by half-time Ireland were 2–0 down thanks to two Koller goals. Butler was substituted at half-time and Ireland went on to win the game 3–2. Butler's international career is generally referred to in derisive terms by Irish supporters and he is often nominated in fans "worst ever Ireland XI's".

== Personal life ==
In September 2010, Butler was arrested for allegedly assaulting a fellow guest at a charity event at Mere Golf Club in Cheshire. Butler pleaded guilty to the assault charges in May 2011 and was sentenced to 120 hours community service.

== Honours ==
Bury

- Football League Second Division: 1996–97

Sunderland

- Football League First Division: 1998–99

Wolverhampton Wanderers

- Football League First Division play-offs: 2003

Individual

- PFA Team of the Year: 1998–99 First Division

== See also ==
- List of Republic of Ireland international footballers born outside the Republic of Ireland
