= 2010–11 Derby County F.C. season =

Derby County F.C.
2010–11 season
- Chairman: Andrew Appleby
- Manager: Nigel Clough
- Championship: 19th
- FA Cup: Third round
- League Cup: First round
- Jack Stamps Trophy: John Brayford
- Top goalscorer: League: Kris Commons (13); All: Kris Commons (13)
- Highest home attendance: 33,010 v Nottingham Forest, Championship (22 January 2011)
- Lowest home attendance: 23,159 v Ipswich Town, Championship (1 February 2011)
- Average home league attendance: 26,023
Home colours	Away colours	Third colours

The 2010–11 season was Derby County's 112th season in the Football League. It was their third consecutive season in the second tier following the previous campaign and their 43rd overall. The club entered the season with odds of 25/1 for the title, the same as the previous year, 6–1 to be promoted and 8–1 to be relegated. In the event of the season, after a slow start The Rams spent five fixtures in the play-off positions after a run of 8 wins from 11 fixtures before collapsing spectacularly post-November and recording just four wins from their remaining 28 fixtures, with Championship safety not guaranteed until the 44th fixture when, despite losing 3–2 at Norwich City other results left the bottom three unable to overtake them. The club's return of 49 points (from a possible 138) was the club's lowest ever return from a 46-game programme and was their lowest points total in the second tier since 1984, when they took just 42 points from 42 fixtures. The Derbyshire evening telegraph summed up the season as being one in which "with a few exceptions, (Derby) have competed in all the games and yet too often they have come out on the wrong end of the result having been the architects of their own downfall. Mistakes, individually and collectively, carelessness and a lack of concentration have all proved costly. As well as they have played in spells, notably in a wonderful purple patch earlier this season, the bottom line is that at other times they have not been good enough, as their position in the table indicates. That is why an influx of new faces is needed in this most important of summers to make sure they move forward next season."

The club's reserves proved more successful. Consisting of players returning from injury (Russell Anderson, Miles Addison), players on the fringe of the first-team squad (Ben Pringle, Lee Croft) and academy prospects (Callum Ball, Jeff Hendrick) they retained The Central League Division One Central Section, taking 33 points from a possible 42 and scoring 35 goals in the process. They also won the Derbyshire Senior Cup, scoring 24 goals in their four fixtures including a 14–1 win over Shirebrook Town.

The club recorded an average attendance of 26,023, a figure more than 3,000 down on the previous campaign but still the second highest in the Championship behind Leeds United's 27,299 and the 15th best in the country. It was also higher than the average gate of seven Premier League clubs.

== Team kit ==
On 1 May 2010 the club announced that website buymobiles.net would be the club's shirt sponsor for the next three years, replacing the two-year association with previous sponsor Bombardier who instead became an "official partner" of the club. The deal was described as the "largest commercial deal in Derby County's history", with sources stating it to be worth around £2m in total. buymobiles already had previous association with the club as it first appeared on the back of the club shirts during the 2004–05 play-off matches against Preston North End and had acted as "Season Presenting Sponsor" during the 2008–09 campaign. The new home kit for the 2010–11 season was revealed at 6pm on 16 July 2010, the day before the club's first pre-season friendly, at a specially arranged Catwalk Show at Pride Park Stadium, with Nigel Clough and his Derby County first team squad all in attendance. It was again manufactured by adidas. The away kit was revealed at half-time in a pre-season friendly against Stoke City.

Home colours	Away colours	Third colours

== Review ==
=== Pre-season ===
Clough entered into the 2010–11 season looking to reinforce the squad that had been so badly afflicted by injuries the previous campaign. Of those at the club, new one-year contracts were given to goalkeepers Saul Deeney and Ross Atkins and Russell Anderson signed a new two-year deal. Clough also stated a desire to retain the services of loanees Tomasz Cywka and Michael Tonge for the new campaign. Cywka agreed a deal to sign on a free transfer from Wigan Athletic on 25 May 2010 but interest in Tonge was curtailed when Stoke City announced he was for sale, pricing Derby out of a move and forcing them to look elsewhere. Injuries once again played a part in Derby's preparations, however, as the continuing absence of former Young Player of the Year Miles Addison, who was ruled out for the season after successfully undergoing foot surgery the previous March, was joined by that of Steve Davies, who ruptured cruciate ligaments, ruling him out for the opening six months of the season. Prior to the start of Derby's pre-season friendly fixtures, it was announced Robbie Savage would remain as Captain, with Shaun Barker replacing Addison as Vice Captain and Stephen Bywater being third in line.

The first confirmed signing of the summer was out of contract Doncaster Rovers left back Gareth Roberts, who agreed a two-year deal to join the club on the expiration of his Doncaster contract on 1 July 2010. A long-standing interest in Crewe Alexandra's John Brayford seemed to have reached its conclusion with reports that the club had agreed a deal for £400,000 plus add-ons, though this was denied by Crewe boss Dario Gradi. Rumours resurfaced two weeks later, suggesting Derby were planning a £1m joint bid for Brayford and teammate James Bailey, who was seen as a long-term replacement for Robbie Savage. Crewe confirmed that an offer for the pair had been accepted on 18 May 2010. The deal was finalised on 19 May 2010 for an undisclosed fee with the deal believed to total an initial £800k, rising to over £1m with add ons and a 15% sell on clause The club announced it had agreed a deal to sign ADO Den Haag utility player Danny Buijs once the Dutch football season had finished, though they later pulled out of the deal.

Dave Martin, who had had a successful loan spell with the club the previous campaign, formally completed his free transfer to the club following the completion of his contract with Millwall on 1 June 2010, signing a two-year deal. After sealing five signings within a month of the end of the 2010–11 season, the club stated that the playing staff was "shaping up more for how we would like it" Additionally, the club tied down five of its academy squad to professional deals on 8 July 2010, with goalkeeper James Severn, defender Kallum Keane, midfielders Jeff Hendrick and Graham Kelly and attacker Ryan Connolly all signing deals to become part of Nigel Clough's first team squad. Kelly was sent out on loan to League of Ireland Premier Division side Bray Wanderers the next day. The club also took on several trialists with Ilkeston Town's Amari Morgan-Smith, American Conor Doyle, Woking striker Joel Ledgister and Australian duo Marc Hatvani and Courtney Chipperfield taking part in the club's pre-season fixtures. Doyle impressed sufficiently enough for the club to sign him on a two-year deal which he signed ahead of the opening day of the season. Despite the addition of Doyle, there was a continued hunt for a new forward. The club where heavily linked with Scunthorpe United's Gary Hooper, who Clough highlighted as a player he admired, though Scunthorpe's fee proved too prohibitive for the club and he eventually joined Celtic for £2.4m, with Clough saying the move was not "right for (Derby) at this stage". Other players to attract attention were West Bromwich Albion's Simon Cox, Everton's James Vaughan, Wigan Athletic's Jason Scotland and Sheffield United's Billy Sharp, though Sharp eventually joined Doncaster Rovers.

Of those leaving the club, it was announced that the contracts of first team players Jay McEveley, Gary Teale, Lee Hendrie, Lewis Price and Mark Dudley, as well as reserve team players Jermaine Johnson, Henrik Ojamaa and Alex Forde, would not be renewed. Paul Connolly was the first under contract player to leave the club, joining Championship rivals Leeds United on a 3-year deal. Leeds, alongside Q.P.R. and Burnley, also expressed an interest in top scorer Rob Hulse, who entered into the final year of his contract and was valued at £1.5m by the club. Derby coach Gary Crosby stated, "As much as we'd like to keep Rob, financially, we will maybe look to sell him" though CEO Tom Glick later dismissed any financial need to sell the striker. He was later linked with a £1m move to newly promoted Premier League side Blackpool, though his rumoured £600,000 yearly wage was suggested to be a stumbling block. Newly capped Irish international Paul Green was the subject of interest, this time from Celtic, though Derby moved quickly to dismiss any talk of a sale, describing Green as "untouchable." Temporary exits came when Lee Croft, who had made just one appearance in the last 8 months at the club, moved on a six-month loan deal to Football League One side Huddersfield Town. and youngsters Greg Mills and Ross Atkins joined AFC Telford United and Tamworth respectively.

The club announced that Season ticket sales matched those of the previous campaign, with 2,000 season ticket sales on Friday 16 April 2010 being "one of the single busiest days in the Ticket Office's history." By close of the club's Early Bird offer (which froze 2010–11 Season Tickets at 2009–10 prices) on 18 April 2010, the club had sold 17,357 season tickets, 471 ahead of sales at the same point the previous summer, and claimed they had received calls from "several hundred" supporters who had been prevented from purchasing by the events of the eruption of Eyjafjallajökull. It was also revealed that the club's CEO, Tom Glick, had been elected to The Football League Board.

=== August ===
Derby began the 2010–11 season away to newly promoted Leeds United. John Brayford, Gareth Roberts and James Bailey made their débuts in a 2–1 win, with Rob Hulse and Kris Commons scoring their first goals of the season as Derby inflicted Leeds first opening day defeat for 21 years and recorded only their second win at Elland Road in 35 years. The win was followed by a 1–0 defeat away to League Two side Crewe Alexandra in the League Cup first round, the club's second successive defeat by a lower league side in the competition's opening stage, and saw injuries to Russell Anderson and Chris Porter weaken the Rams squad further. They were later joined by Ryan Connolly, who was ruled out for six months with a cruciate knee ligament injury incurred during an Under-18's friendly. Luke Varney, who was linked with another loan spell away from the club, made a shock return to the first team line-up after a year when Rob Hulse was ruled out for the home game against Cardiff City, leaving Varney as the only available striker on the books. Although Varney laid on Derby's goal for Tomasz Cwyka, the club fell to a second consecutive defeat as Cardiff ran out 2–1 winners. Despite being the sole forward fully fit and available, Varney was left out of the trip to Coventry City, to prevent a risk of injury ahead of a proposed loan move to an unidentified club. Left-back Dean Moxey was employed as a lone striker and scored his first for the club as it fell to another 2–1 defeat. After the match, it was revealed that Varney had joined Premier League club Blackpool on a season long deal, with a view to a £500k permanent move. The month's fixtures finished with a visit from league leaders Queens Park Rangers. Derby took a 2–0 lead, with James Bailey scoring his first for the club to add to Kris Commons opener, before QPR scored twice in second half injury time to snatch a 2–2 draw. It was the second consecutive season in which QPR had come from two down to claim a result at Pride Park Stadium, after recovering from two down to win 4–2 at Derby the previous campaign. Bailey's performance say him earn a place in the Football League Championship Team of the Week, the first Derby player to do so in the 2010–11 campaign.

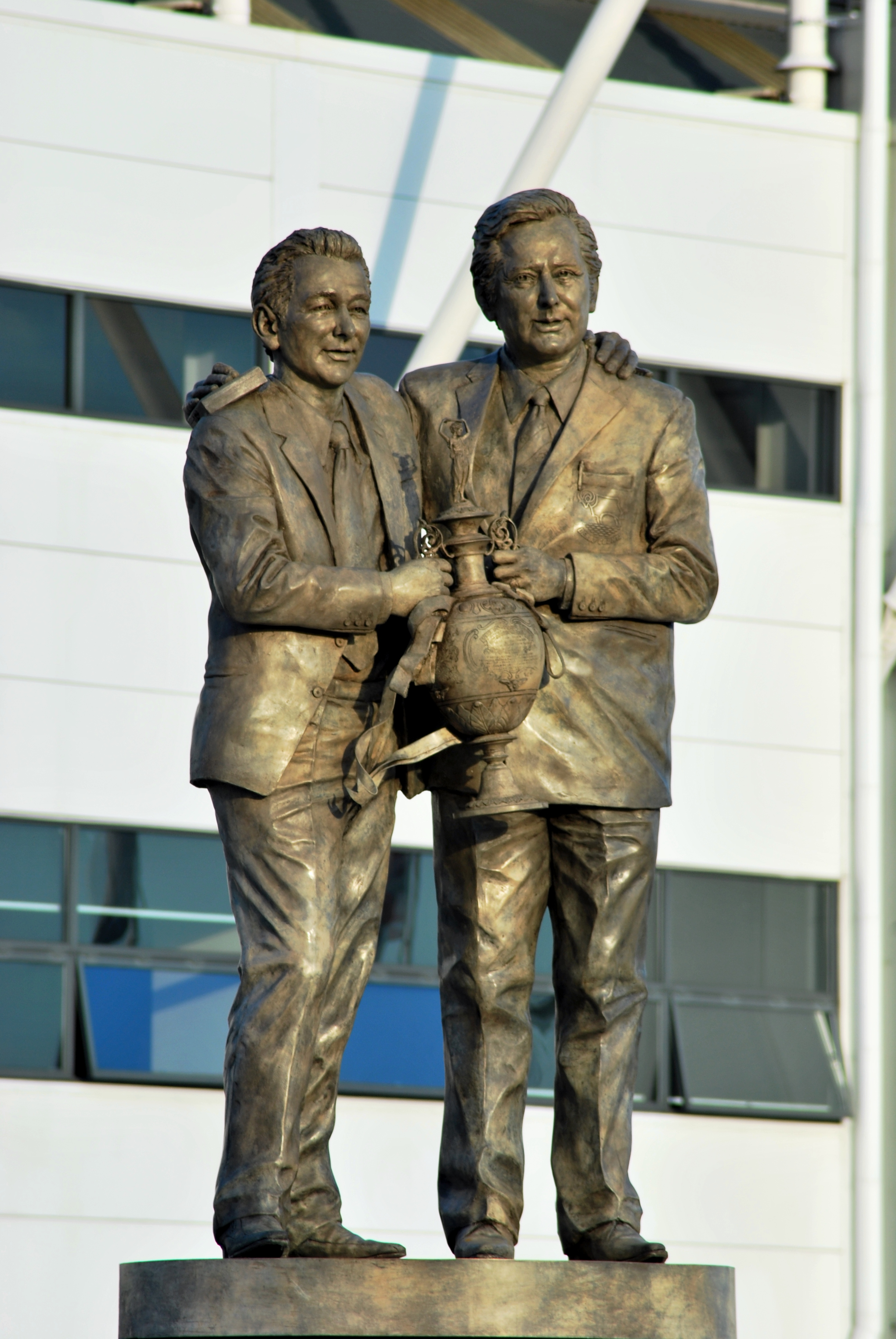
Clough and Taylor Statue

With the end of the transfer window approaching, Derby took Adelaide United youngster Alex Sunasky on trial and registered loan bids for W.B.A. striker Chris Wood, Real Valladolid's Alberto Bueno and long term target, Everton forward James Vaughan. Bueno eventually joined on a season long loan. It was also revealed that Clough left the Coventry defeat 5 minutes early to watch Notts County midfielder Ben Davies. though he remained at Notts County. Rob Hulse was again linked with a move away from the club, this time to Cardiff City, this time with the possibility of a cash-plus-Ross McCormack deal (though McCormack later joined Leeds United) and Queens Park Rangers. He eventually joined QPR for an undisclosed fee believed to be in the region of £750k, rising to over £1m after clauses. The only other move saw Arnaud Mendy leave to join Tranmere Rovers on a month-long loan.

Financially, the club was revealed to have slashed almost 60% off of its agent's fees for the 2009–10 season in comparison to 2008–09 campaign. They spent £434,350, the ninth highest sum in the division, against the £1 million plus spent the previous year. The fees covered the 60 transactions, the highest in the country, the club committed to over the period between 1 July 2009, and 30 June 2010, which covered 22 loanees, 17 new registrations, 12 cancelled contracts and 9 updated contracts.

The month ended with the unveiling of the long proposed Clough/Taylor statue at Pride Park. In 2008 a 9'0 high bronze statue of the pair – who had managed the club between 1967 and 1973 – was commissioned to adorn the north west portion of the ground to be called Unity Plaza. The statue was designed by Andrew Edwards and features both Clough and Taylor holding Football League First Division which they won with the club in the 1972. It was unveiled on 27 August 2010, 24 hours before the 2–2 draw with Queens Park Rangers.

=== September ===
Derby entered the September international break with just four points from their opening four games and with no wins in their last four games in all competitions. The club's owners faced recriminations from supporters over the sale of Rob Hulse (top scorer over the last two season) on transfer deadline day leaving no time to recruit an adequate replacement, leading Executive Chairman Tom Glick to defend the club's actions, stating "We presented the offer to the manager and staff and they made the judgement from a footballing standpoint that this is an offer that was right to accept. Rob has been a great contributor and we acknowledge that when a player like Rob goes there will be disappointment. But ultimately I would have them [the fans] look at the squad Nigel has put together, take a look past the temporary injury situation and take a look at what we have in the squad and the style of football we are playing. And I would say have some faith that Nigel has done a very good job with recruitment and the results will be coming very soon. We firmly believe that." The squad was again suffering from injuries – Chris Porter (hip), Russell Anderson (groin), Stephen Pearson (knee) were all short term casualties, with Steve Davies (cruciate ligaments) and Miles Addison (foot) out for the season. In addition, Jake Buxton was fit enough only for the bench and Tomasz Cywka playing with a protective mask on after fracturing his cheekbone. Reigning Player of the Year Shaun Barker was also playing with a slight thigh strain. The club restated its intention to benefit from the loan system, saying "There will be more and better players available on 7 September that were not available in the last window. That has to do Premier League's 25-man squad rule and Premier League sides holding on to guys just in case to make final decision" The club revealed it had agreed a deal with West Bromwich Albion to sign Chris Wood on loan, but WBA's own injury problems forced them to pull the plug on any deal. Though Derby initially hoped to resurrect it at a later date, they instead bought in Swansea City's Shefki Kuqi on a three-month loan and Wood's West Brom teammate Luke Moore and Sunderland youngster Ryan Noble on 29-day deals. There was also interest in Leicester City's Matt Fryatt, Aston Villa's Shane Lowry and former England U18 defender Netan Sansara was taken on trial.

Results on the pitch did not improve, however, as defeats to Sheffield United and Hull City saw the club fall into the bottom three of the division for the first time under Clough's managerial reign, before a 1–1 draw at Barnsley, in which Dean Leacock scored his first professional goal to open the scoring, saw the club escape the relegation zone while extending its winless run to 7 matches in all competitions. The run was ended with a 5–0 thrashing of Crystal Palace on 25 September 2010. Alberto Bueno, who earned a place in the Football League Championship Team of the Week and Shefki Kuqi both scored their first goals for the club as Derby recorded their biggest league win since they beat Tranmere Rovers by the same scoreline on 17 April 1995. Kris Commons also scored in the Palace rout and took his tally to five with a double in a 3–1 win over Middlesbrough three days later, also missing a penalty, as Derby claimed their first consecutive victories of the season and lifted themselves up to 15th with 11 points from their first 9 games.

Rumours again surfaced regarding the club's financial position and from the financial position of investor Jeff Martinovich, though CEO Tom Glick dismissed Martinovich as "a smaller investor who is not on the board, not involved in the operations of the football club and whatever troubles he has had they have not impacted on the bigger picture." Glick also dismissed a claim that the club has been for sale in the summer, stating "That is categorically untrue. We are baffled by the suggestion. There is nothing in it that is true and our commitment as an ownership group and operating Derby County for the long term remains in place." The rumours had gained credance due to the club missing out on high-profile targets James Vaughan and Chris Wood, though Glick stated this had been to footballing reasons rather than financial ones, with Derby matching or bettering the offers of the clubs the players eventually joined, Crystal Palace and Barnsley respectively.

=== October ===
With injuries continuing to bite into the squad, with five centrebacks in Dean Leacock, Russell Anderson, Jake Buxton, Miles Addison and Mitchell Hanson unavailable, forcing rightback John Brayford to deputise at centrehalf and midfielder Paul Green to move rightback, Derby revealed they had made a loan approach for an unnamed 21-year-old Premier League defender ahead of the trip to Swansea City. though it was rebuffed. It was also announced that Arnaud Mendy's loan spell at Tranmere Rovers had been extended for another two months. They also took Euan Holden on trial. Of the loanees at the club, Luke Moore's spell at the club was extended to a second month, though Ryan Noble returned to Sunderland at the end of his 29-day loan after a back injury restricted him to just one substitute appearance, though Clough suggested a desire to bring him back when he regained full fitness.

The club entered into the second international break of the season with a 0–0 draw at Swansea City which took the club's unbeaten run to four games, ending The Swans 100% home record in the process. During the international break, Russell Anderson, Mitchell Hanson and Gareth Roberts returned to action with roles in a reserve defeat against Rotherham United Addison was later pencilled in to play a reserve game against Sheffield Wednesday but was later withdrawn as a precaution after admitting he felt "a bit stiff". The promise of the imminent return of the defensive trio was dampened by the news first-choice goalkeeper Stephen Bywater has been ruled out for four weeks with a wrist injury sustained in training. The club moved to bring in a loan keeper, as they had the previous campaign while Bywater was suspended, and were linked with former number one Lee Grant and former target, Blackburn Rovers stopper Frank Fielding. Fielding eventually joined ahead of the Preston North End game on an emergency four-week deal. Saul Deeney was then ruled out of contention due to being placed on compassionate leave due to a serious family illness, leading to a recall for Ross Atkins from his loan spell at Tamworth, with James Severn instead sent to the club as a compensatory replacement. Fielding kept a clean sheet on his debut, a 3–0 victory over Preston North End and then helped The Rams to a second consecutive win as they beat Doncaster Rovers 3–2 at Keepmoat Stadium to reach 7th in the table, the club's highest league position since the opening day of the 2009–10 season. The run ended with a 2–0 reverse at Millwall, though a 4–1 home win over Watford saw The Rams end the month with 10 points from a possible 15. Tomasz Cywka grabbed a brace in the win, which earned him a place in the Championship Team of the Week.

Chief Executive Tom Glick also answered fan questions in the local newspaper, the Derby Evening Telegraph. In a two part interview over the course of the 9/10 weekend international break, Glick revealed that the £15-million interest only loan against the Pride Park Stadium which was considered serviceable through the club's current operations and due to be repaid in 2016, with the club's wage bill operating at between £9m-£10m or just below 60% of the club's turnover. He added that the club had not turned a profit in the previous years of GSE's involvement and would be unlikely to in the current campaign, with the group's investors covering losses to ensure that losses did not add to the clubs debt. He also revealed that the club expected to be challenging for promotion to the Premier League within the next two years and back in the top flight within the next five with the aim for the 2010–11 campaign a top-half finish.

=== November ===
November opened with a fifth straight home win of the campaign, when Portsmouth were beaten 2–0 in front of the Sky Sports cameras and a season record crowd of 29,086. The win lifted Derby into 4th in the table with the further boost of the return of Miles Addison for his first appearance in 10 months. Dean Moxey also earned a place in the Championship Team of the Week. The result was followed up with a third straight victory; 2–0 at Ipswich Town, which ended a run of seven straight defeats at Portman Road stretching back to 2002, as Kris Commons took his season tally to nine with a second-half brace. A 2–0 defeat at Leicester City was followed by a 3–2 win over Scunthorpe United, despite being reduced to 10-man after Gareth Roberts became the first Derby player of the season to be sent off. The victory was the club's sixth consecutive home win, with 20 goals scored in the process, setting a record at Pride Park and was the club's best run of home form for over 15 years. It also saw Robbie Savage and Kris Commons named in the division's Team of the Week. The month ended with a 2–1 defeat away to Burnley, though Savage was again named in the team of the Week.

In terms of playing staff, Stephen Bywater and Saul Deeney returned to availability after six weeks out, though Frank Fielding's loan from Blackburn Rovers was still extended after his seven appearances had reaped three clean sheet and 15 points from a possible 21. Luke Moore's loan was also extended to a third and final month. The return of Deeney and Bywater took Derby's available goalkeepers to four, meaning Ross Atkins was able to return to Tamworth on loan, with James Severn returning to Derby after six appearances for the non-league outfit. The club was also linked with a move for Bryne striker Geir André Herrem. It was revealed that Blackpool intended to complete a deal for on-loan Luke Varney, who had notched four goals in his loan spell at the Premier League team. Blackpool, manager Ian Holloway claimed that Blackpool had a "massive clause" in the loan deal which meant they could sign Varney for just £250k in the January 2011 transfer window, though Derby denied this saying Varney could be sold to any club and that no deal is in place with Blackpool. This alerted West Bromwich Albion to the striker's availability.

=== December ===
Derby entered December fourth in the table but two consecutive defeats, at home to Norwich City (a first home defeat in over two months) and away to Bristol City (in a match marred by the controversial decision not to send off Bristol City keeper David James with the scores at 0–0), saw The Rams drop to seventh place. The defeats continued throughout the month, with a 2–1 defeat at home to Reading, the postponement due to snow of a home fixture against Doncaster Rovers and a 5–2 humbling away to local rivals Nottingham Forest meant Derby failed to take a solitary point from December's four fixtures and dropped to 12th in the table on the back of their worst sequence of results for three years. The Forest result saw Clough's patience snap with his playing staff, singling out Dean Leacock and Paul Green as "offering nothing", saying "We get to the stage where we give the players every opportunity but at some point you have to move on to the next group. You've either got it or you go back to League Two or Poland or wherever you're from. We can't afford to have nights like this."

The return of Stephen Bywater and the continuing presence of Luke Moore as first choice loan striker saw Frank Fielding and Shefki Kuqi return to their parent clubs on completion of their loan deals. It was also announced that reigning Player of the Year Shaun Barker had signed a new 3 1/2 deal with the club. At the end of his loan, Moore decided against staying with the club for the rest of the season, preferring to return to W.B.A. and "keep his options open" going into the January transfer window. The playing staff was bolstered by the return of Steve Davies and Chris Porter from long-term injuries though Clough still stated his intention to reshape his playing staff over the January transfer window, stating that Lee Croft in particular had no future at the club.

=== January ===
The Rams started 2011 with a New Year's Day fixture away to Preston North End, just as they had opened 2007 in the 2006–07 promotion campaign. Clough made five changes to the side humiliated at Nottingham Forest just three days before. Dean Leacock, heavily criticised as "offering nothing" the previous game, was dropped to the bench, and Stephen Pearson, Conor Doyle and a returning Robbie Savage introduced into the midfield. Two enforced changes came with Gareth Roberts replacing the suspended Dean Moxey and Chris Porter making his first start of the league campaign as a replacement for Luke Moore, who returned to W.B.A. on the completion of his three-month loan. In the event, the changes earned Derby a first win in 6 as a Porter double sealed a 2–1 win at the division's bottom club. The result was followed by a 0–0 home draw with Millwall, Clough's 100th match in charge. The return of just seven points from the last nine fixtures was beginning to affect attendances, with just 24,239 attending the Millwall draw, the lowest attendance for a league match at Pride Park Stadium for almost four years, when just 23,122 attended an evening kick-off victory against Burnley on Tuesday 30 January. It was the third time in the 2010–11 campaign that attendances had dipped below 25,000 for a league fixture, something which had previously nor occurred since the said fixture against Burnley. The numbers, plus the nature of the support, led captain Robbie Savage to criticise the club's support, saying "What you want them to do when we are not playing well is get behind us. It's as if they're waiting for a mistake to get on our backs." However, the club's slight revival was undermined by a giant killing at the hands of non-league Crawley in the FA Cup third round, described by reporters as one of the "biggest FA Cup shocks of all time" and others as the most "humiliating result in Derby County's history". The result saw Clough's job at the club reportedly come under threat as he issued an apology to the club's supporters, many of whom responded with demands for his dismissal Derby's Chief Executive Tom Glick answered fan's concerns by reiterating the club's support for Clough, saying "Nigel is absolutely our guy. We have been clear about that continuously" and promising investment in the playing staff in the current transfer window. The last result of the month saw Derby crash 1–0 at home to Nottingham Forest in front of a season-high crowd of 33,010. It was their first loss to their rivals at the Pride Park Stadium.

Going into the January transfer window, Clough stated his desire to add three players, saying "in an absolute ideal world a defender, a midfielder and a forward would bolster the squad at the moment." Over the month club's principal targets were revealed as Liverpool defender Daniel Ayala, Notts County midfielder Ben Davies, Leicester City striker Martyn Waghorn and Kilmarnock forward Conor Sammon. Of the set, only long term target Davies joined the club before the closing of the transfer window, in a deal worth £350,000 after two lower bids were initially rejected. A season long loan deal for Ayala was delayed after he failed to recover in time from injury, loan target Waghorn decided to remain at Leicester and Sammon opted to join Wigan Athletic, despite a bid of around £600,000 being accepted by Kilmarnock. New one-year contract extensions were awarded to young duo Ryan Connolly and Jeff Hendrick and Lee Croft returned from his loan spell at Huddersfield Town, after just three appearances in five months.

In terms of departures, two players left for transfer fees. Contract-rebel Kris Commons joined Celtic for a fee of around £300k, turning down a £500k overture from Celtic's Old Firm rivals who failed to match his wage demands. Left back Dean Moxey was the subject of a £400,000 bid from Crystal Palace, which was accepted by Derby. Clough stated the bid's acceptance was football, rather than financially related, explaining "He (Moxey) has not really progressed this season as much as we hoped. We just thought it was a good offer. We have got another good left back in Gareth Roberts and we can always get cover in on loan if we need it." Other departures saw Medi Abalimba, whose contract at Derby was terminated but the club held onto his registration, join Oldham Athletic on a free and the young trio of Graham Kelly, Mitchell Hanson and Kallum Keane had their contracts canceled five months early by mutual consent. Temporary departures saw Ross Atkins extend his stay at Tamworth and Greg Mills rejoin Telford on season long deals. Dave Martin moved on a month-long loan to League One side Notts County.

Rumoured departures saw Dean Leacock and Paul Green linked with moves to the Premier League; Leacock with West Bromwich Albion and Green with Wolverhampton Wanderers and Blackpool, though both ultimately remained with the club. It was also revealed that club captain Robbie Savage was considering leaving the club for a move to Vancouver Whitecaps, Savage stating "One thing is for sure, I will be leaving Derby County at the end of the season, if not before, even if they offer me a new contract. My time is up here. I've thoroughly enjoyed my time with Derby and I want to walk away with my head held high." One fan responded by telephoning Savage during an interview on BBC Radio 5 Live and telling him to "leave the club now" and "take young Mr. Clough with him." Savage eventually rejected the move, stating it was too big a move for his family. Savage eventually announced his intention to retire at the end of the 2010–11 campaign via. his Twitter account on 31 January 2011.

=== February ===
With the January exits of Kris Commons and Dean Moxey, coupled with the suspension of Dean Leacock, Clough made four changes from the defeat by Nottingham Forest for a home visit from Ipswich Town but the result remained the same – despite Alberto Bueno opening the scoring in the seventh minute, with his first goal in four months, Ipswich claimed a 2–1 victory at Pride Park to make it four consecutive home defeats for Derby. A season low of just 23,159 attended the game, and protests came from supporters over the perceived lack of investment from the board in the form of a "Sack the Board" banner unfurled prior to kick-off, a spectator streaking on the pitch during the second half, the booing off of the players at full-time and post-game protests by the main entrance to Pride Park, attended by some 2,000 supporters. There was also pressure on Clough, who was criticised by PFA Chief Gordon Taylor after comments he made about Tomasz Cwyka following a 1–1 draw at Portsmouth. Of Cywka, Clough said "He's an extremely inexperienced and not very bright footballer ... he can go back to Wigan or wherever he came from – I'm not really bothered – until he learns the game." This led Taylor to state that "It cannot be appropriate to criticise your team in such a way in public. We'll sort things out ... otherwise it looks an untenable situation." Home defeats to Leicester City and Hull City and a 0–0 draw at Scunthorpe United stretched the club's winless run to eight games, with just one from the last fourteen, before a 1–0 away win at relegation rivals Sheffield United took the club 8 points clear of relegation with 13 games to play. The win saw Championship Team of the Week performances from John Brayford and goalscorer Theo Robinson.

With the re-opening of the loan window, Derby signed Liverpool's Daniel Ayala, Sheffield United's Jamie Ward and Millwall's Theo Robinson on loan deals until the end of the season. Injuries to goalkeepers Stephen Bywater and Saul Deeney also led to the return of Blackburn Rovers goalkeeper Frank Fielding, who had been at the club earlier in the campaign, on loan until the end of the season and the recall of Ross Atkins from his loan spell at Tamworth. They were also unsuccessful loan bids for Swansea City forward Craig Beattie, Ipswich Town defender Damien Delaney, Blackpool's Rob Edwards, who had spent half-a-season at Pride Park in the 2003–04 season, and Preston North End's Paul Hayes.

Thirty-four-year-old former-Barnsley striker Michael Boulding also signed for the club on a non-contract basis for the remainder of the campaign. The club also awarded new contracts to Steve Davies and Ben Pringle, with both deals being for an initial year with the option of a one-year extension.

The home defeat by Leicester City was followed by more protests from supporters towards the board, leading Clough to request that the fans "stick with the team and owners", claiming "This season we are going to survive and next season we will be better for these experiences." In the light of the protest, former owner Peter Gadsby launched a new takeover bid for the club, stating he wanted to be "involved with the club again." Derby County later released an official statement denying Gadsby's claims, saying "Mr. Gadsby has not, as is being reported, made an offer to buy the Club. The ownership group can confirm it recently received a letter from a third party, acting as a representative of Mr. Gadsby. There was no offer made in this letter. In addition, this letter did not specify how Mr. Gadsby intends to involve himself with the Club. The Club's ownership group has responded in writing and has had no subsequent contact with either Mr Gadsby or this third party, prior to today's public comments made through the media." The increasing sense of distrust between GSE and the Derby support led to various accusations being aimed at the club, including one that The Rams were being set up as a feeder club for MLS side Vancouver Whitecaps.

=== March ===
Derby went into a their re-arranged home fixture against Doncaster Rovers with renewed confidence following their victory at Sheffield United, but turned out a performance described as captain Robbie Savage as "absolute disgrace" as they crashed to a 3–1 defeat. The crowd booed the players at full-time and accorded manager Nigel Clough with chants of "You don't know what you're doing" following the substitution of Theo Robinson. Clough responded that "I thought they (the fans) should have booed a little bit louder" and indicated he had no issues with the criticism of his substitution, admitting "They are entitled to do that." The result was followed with five points from the next four games, as a win over 2nd placed Swansea City and draws with Barnsley and Crystal Palace left the club 9 points clear of relegation, with nine to play, going into the international break. Jamie Ward, who hit a stunning 35-yard strike in the 2–2 draw at Crystal Palace, was named in the Championship Team of the Week for 19/20 March.

The club was active in the emergency loan market, letting Stephen Bywater and Ben Pringle move out on loan, to Cardiff City and Torquay United respectively. However, Pringle spent just 19 days of the loan at Torquay, playing five days, returning to Derby after expressing a desire to fight for a place in the Derby first team rather than remain at Plainmoor. A loan deal which would have seen Dean Leacock move to Hull City for the remainder of the campaign also fell through. In terms of incoming deals, Matt Duke arrived on a season long loan from Hull City. The move for Duke proved to be a preemptive measure, as Frank Fielding's loan from Blackburn Rovers, which the club revealed was with a view to a permanent deal, would run out at the end of March, and not the end of the campaign as previously suggested, due to the 93-day emergency loan rule. However, Duke was recalled by Hull City before he was able to make a competitive appearance, who reacted by bringing in Liverpool's Brad Jones until the end of the campaign.

Going into the final two months of the season, the board made several announcements regarding its intentions for the 2011–12 campaign. Regarding season tickets, the club announced its early-bird initiative would be extended until 15 May to ensure supporters knew which division the club would be in the following campaign and also offered season ticket holders a money-back guarantee if they are upset about the club's transfer activity during the close season, Tom Glick saying "It's about holding us to account and supporters judging us by our actions." Glick also stated his disappointment with the lack of progress made during the game, stating there would be extra investment to bring in several "established" Championship "name" players to excite the support and his expectation that the club would at least occupy a top six position in the upcoming campaign. The club also published its accounts up to May 2010, showing a loss of £2.16m, compared to a loss of £14.93m for the previous 12 months. The figures showed the club's debt reduced from £22.3m to £19.1m, with Glick stating it currently stood at £15m after season ticket income was used to pay back part of the sum in June 2010. Turnover was marginally down £1.5m from £31.3m to £29.8m, mainly as a result of the club's 2008–09 domestic cup success (when it reached the League Cup semi finals and the FA Cup 5th Round) was not repeated. The wage bill for players was also reduced from £15.5m to £10.5m – and is said to currently stand at just over £9m after the departure of high-earners Rob Hulse and Kris Commons.

=== April and May ===
The first game of April saw a 4–1 reverse at Cardiff City, which also saw Paul Green sustain a cruciate and medial ligaments injury which ruled him out for between six and nine months. Derby bounced back by taking five points from their next three games, a 2–2 draw at Coventry City, in which they fought back from 2–0 down, a 2–1 victory over Leeds United and a 0–0 draw away to top of the table Queens Park Rangers to leave themselves 9 points clear of relegation with just four games to play. Despite losing their next two games (Burnley and Norwich City) safety was confirmed on Easter Monday 2011, when results elsewhere assured The Rams could not be caught by their relegation rivals in the bottom three. With safety assured, Shaun Barker had surgery on a knee problem which had been an issue throughout most of his two years at Derby and had prevented him from training for the majority of the end of the 2010–11 season. Barker took to the pitch prior to the start of the last home game of the season against Bristol City to hand over his 2009–10 Jack Stamps Trophy to John Brayford. The match ended in a 0–2 defeat and meant that Derby lost 11 of their 23 home games throughout the campaign. In a post-match interview Clough stated that whilst talking with the fellow management staff during the game he had wondered "How many of those players out who started today we want out there on 6 August (and the answer is) not too many" and that he intended to bring in "6, 8, maybe 10" new players in the close season. Flying in the face of such talk of Clough restructuring was press speculation that Clough, fearing interference, would quit his position at Derby to return to Burton Albion. The final fixture of the season saw Ross Atkins and Callum Ball given their first professional starts in a 2–1 defeat at Reading which saw The Rams end the season in 19th, their lowest position on the league ladder in 5 years. The final tally of 49 points was the club's lowest ever from a 46-game season and their lowest in the second tier since 1984.

Following the completion of the 2010–11 season, Derby announced their retained list for the 2011–12 campaign. Goalkeeping trio Saul Deeney, Ross Atkins and James Severn were all given new deals to their expiring contracts, while Callum Ball, Alex Witham, Aaron Cole and Chris Jones become first-year professionals after completing their scholarship programmes. The club also quickly entered into the transfer market, tying up permanent deals for loanees Frank Fielding, Jamie Ward and Theo Robinson within 48 hours of the end of the season, with the three signing for undisclosed fees, rumoured to total £900k. They also made a £700k bid for Barnsley defender Jason Shackell, a £1.25m move for Leicester City player Martyn Waghorn and a £300k move for Kilmarnock's Craig Bryson – all of which were rejected. The club also agreed terms with out-of-contract Aberdeen striker Chris Maguire, though the two clubs struggled to agree over the £400,000 compensation fee. There was also confirmation of a formal bid for Burton Albion goalkeeper Adam Legzdins. Speculated targets for the club included Watford midfielder John Eustace, who had had a loan spell at the club in 2009, Birmingham City's Kevin Phillips and Lee Bowyer, Adam Rooney of Inverness Caledonian Thistle. and Nottingham Forest's Nathan Tyson. There was also rumours of an audacious swoop for Manchester United and England striker Michael Owen, which Clough himself later dismissed as "silly season" speculation.

The club confirmed the departures of Chris Porter, Greg Mills and Arnaud Mendy, alongside the retiring Robbie Savage, as they would not be offered new deals. It also confirmed that loanees Brad Jones, Daniel Ayala and Alberto Bueno would all return to their parent clubs. Ben Pringle was also told he was free to find another club, despite being handed a new 18-month contract just 3 months earlier and he later agreed personal terms with Rotherham United. It was also reported that Aberdeen had a move for Russell Anderson accepted but the player rejected the chance of a move, preferring to remain at Pride Park Stadium.

At the end of May, the club announced it had sold 16,200 Early Bird Season tickets for the following campaign, just 500 down from the same point last season.

== End of Season squad ==
Player	Country	Squad number	Position	Signed from	Date	Fee paid	Total Derby appearances	Total Derby goals
Stephen Bywater	(England)	1	Goalkeeper	West Ham United	29 August 2006	£225k	166/1	0
John Brayford	(England)	2	Defender	Crewe Alexandra	19 May 2010	Undisclosed	48	1
Gareth Roberts	(Wales)	3	Defender	Doncaster Rovers	1 July 2010	Free	25/3	0
Paul Green	(Republic of Ireland) (Note: Green was born in Pontefract, England, but also qualified to represent the Republic of Ireland internationally through his maternal grandmother and made his international debut for the Republic of Ireland in May 2010.)	4	Midfielder	Doncaster Rovers	1 July 2008	Free	111/3	10
Shaun Barker	(England)	5	Defender	Blackpool	15 July 2009	£900k	79/4	6
Dean Leacock	(England)	6	Defender	Fulham	11 August 2006	£375k	112/14	1
Steve Davies	(England)	7	Forward	Tranmere Rovers	12 June 2008	£275k, rising to £725k	34/33	11
Robbie Savage	(Wales)	8	Midfielder	Blackburn Rovers	9 January 2008	£1.5m	129/8	7
Theo Robinson	(England) (Note: Robinson was born in Birmingham, England, but also qualified to represent Jamaica internationally and would make his international debut for Jamaica in February 2013.)	9	Forward	Millwall	22 February 2011	Loan	8/5	2
Jamie Ward	(Northern Ireland) (Note: Ward was born in Birmingham, England, but also qualifies to represent Northern Ireland internationally through his grandfather and represented them at U-19 and U-21 level before making his international debut for Northern Ireland in August 2011.)	10	Forward	Sheffield United	16 February 2011	Loan	13	5
Stephen Pearson	(Scotland)	11	Midfielder	Celtic	11 January 2007	£750k	103/22	4
Chris Porter	(England)	12	Forward	Motherwell	1 February 2009	£400k	25/25	9
Saul Deeney	(Republic of Ireland) (Note: Deeney was born in Derry, Northern Ireland, but also qualifies to represent the Republic of Ireland internationally and represented them at U-21 level.)	13	Goalkeeper	Unattached	31 July 2009	Free	2/1	0
Russell Anderson	(Scotland)	14	Defender	Unattached	15 January 2010	Free	13/13	1
Dave Martin	(England)	15	Midfielder	Millwall	1 June 2010	Free	2/11	1
James Bailey	(England)	16	Midfielder	Crewe Alexandra	19 May 2010	Undisclosed	34/4	1
Jake Buxton	(England)	17	Defender	Burton Albion	1 July 2009	Free	24/1	1
Ben Pringle	(England)	18	Midfielder	Ilkeston Town	1 July 2009	Free	7/16	0
Tomasz Cywka	(Poland)	19	Forward	Wigan Athletic	1 July 2010	Free	26/12	4
Miles Addison	(England)	20	Defender	Trainee	1 July 2005	N/A	64/13	5
Daniel Ayala	(Spain)	21	Defender	Liverpool	11 February 2010	Loan	16/1	0
Luke Varney	(England)	22	Forward	Charlton Athletic	27 November 2008	£1m+	11/4	1
Conor Doyle	(United States) (Note: Doyle was born in McKinney, Texas, United States, and represented them at U-20 and U-23 level, but also qualifies to represent the Republic of Ireland internationally and represented them at U-21 level before pledging his international allegiance to the United States.)	23	Forward	Creighton University	6 August 2010	Free	5/10	0
Arnaud Mendy	(Guinea-Bissau) (Note: Mendy was born in Évreux, France, but also qualifies to represent Guinea-Bissau internationally and made his international debut for Guinea-Bissau in 2011.)	24	Midfielder	Trainee	1 July 2009	N/A	0/1	0
Mark O'Brien	(Republic of Ireland)	25	Defender	Trainee	1 July 2009	N/A	0/3	0
Callum Ball	(England)	26	Forward	Trainee	2 January 2009	N/A	1/5	0
Alberto Bueno	(Spain)	27	Striker	Real Valladolid	31 August 2010	Loan	25/4	5
Ben Davies	(England)	28	Midfielder	Notts County	20 January 2011	£350k	10/3	1
Jeff Hendrick	(Republic of Ireland)	29	Midfielder	Trainee	2 May 2010	N/A	0/4	0
Ross Atkins	(England)	30	Goalkeeper	Trainee	1 July 2009	N/A	1	0
James Severn	(England)	31	Goalkeeper	Trainee	1 July 2009	N/A	0/1	0
Brad Jones	(Australia)	33	Goalkeeper	Liverpool	24 March 2011	Loan	7	0
Michael Boulding	(England)	36	Forward	Unattached	25 February 2011	Free	0	0

== Transfers ==
=== In ===
Permanent

Player	Country	Squad number	Position	Signed from	Date	Fee Paid
John Brayford	(England)	2	Defender	Crewe Alexandra	19 May 2010	Undisclosed
James Bailey	(England)	16	Midfielder	Crewe Alexandra	19 May 2010	Undisclosed
Dave Martin	(England)	15	Midfielder	Millwall	1 June 2010	Free
Gareth Roberts	(Wales)	3	Defender	Doncaster Rovers	1 July 2010	Free
Tomasz Cywka	(Poland)	19	Forward	Wigan Athletic	1 July 2010	Free
Conor Doyle	(United States)	23	Forward	Creighton University	6 August 2010	Free
Ben Davies	(England)	28	Midfielder	Notts County	20 January 2011	£350k
Michael Boulding	(England)	36	Forward	Unattached	25 February 2011	Free

Loan

Player	Country	Squad number	Position	Loaned from	Date	Loan duration
Alberto Bueno	(Spain)	27	Forward	Real Valladolid	31 August 2010	Season Long
Shefki Kuqi	(Finland) (Note: Kuqi was born in Vushtrri, Yugoslavia (now part of Kosovo), but was raised in Finland and made his international debut for Finland in August 1999.)	9	Forward	Swansea City	13 September 2010	Three Months
Luke Moore	(England)	28	Striker	West Bromwich Albion	24 September 2010	Three Months
Ryan Noble	(England)	29	Striker	Sunderland	27 September 2010	One Month
Frank Fielding	(England)	34	Goalkeeper	Blackburn Rovers	15 October 2010	Two Months
Daniel Sánchez Ayala	(Spain)	21	Defender	Liverpool	11 February 2011	Three Months
Jamie Ward	(Northern Ireland)	10	Forward	Sheffield United	16 February 2011	Three Months
Theo Robinson	(England)	9	Forward	Millwall	22 February 2011	Three Months
Frank Fielding	(England)	34	Goalkeeper	Blackburn Rovers	25 February 2011	One Month^{[I]}
Matt Duke	(England)	33	Goalkeeper	Hull City	4 March 2011	17 Days^{[II]}
Brad Jones	(Australia)	-	Goalkeeper	Liverpool	24 March 2011	Six weeks

Notes
I Fielding was originally signed until the end of the 2010–11 season (ten weeks), though it was later revealed that the F.A.'s 93-emergency loan transfer rule limited his stay to just four weeks.
II Duke was originally signed on loan until the end of the 2010–11 season (nine weeks), but was later recalled by parent club Hull City, effective from 31 March.

=== Out ===
Permanent

Player	Country	Squad number	Position	Signed from	Date	Fee paid	Total Derby appearances	Total Derby goals	Sold to	Date	Fee received
Paul Connolly	(England)	2	Defender	Plymouth Argyle	15 May 2008	Free	68/5	1	Leeds United	10 June 2010	Free
Jay McEveley	(Scotland) (Note: McEveley was born in Liverpool, England, and represented them at U-20 and U-21 level, but also qualified to represent Scotland internationally and represented them at B level before making his international debut for Scotland in August 2007.)	3	Defender	Blackburn Rovers	29 January 2007	£600k, rising to £1m	84/17	6	End of Contract	30 June 2010	N/A
Gary Teale	(Scotland)	11	Midfielder	Wigan Athletic	11 January 2007	£600k	75/29	5	End of Contract	30 June 2010	N/A
Lee Hendrie	(England)	26	Midfielder	Sheffield United	1 September 2009	P/Ex	5/5	0	End of Contract	30 June 2010	N/A
Mark Dudley	(England)	33	Defender	Trainee	1 July 2008	N/A	0/1	0	End of Contract	30 June 2010	N/A
Alex Forde	(England)	—	Defender	Trainee	1 July 2009	N/A	0	0	End of Contract	30 June 2010	N/A
Jermaine Johnson	(England)	—	Defender	Trainee	1 July 2009	N/A	0	0	End of Contract	30 June 2010	N/A
Henrik Ojamaa	(Estonia)	—	Striker	Trainee	1 July 2009	N/A	0	0	End of Contract	30 June 2010	N/A
Lewis Price	(Wales) (Note: Price was born in Bournemouth, England, but also qualifies to represent Wales internationally and made his international debut for Wales in November 2005.)	—	Goalkeeper	Ipswich Town	27 July 2007	Undisclosed	9	0	End of Contract	30 June 2010	N/A
Rob Hulse	(England)	9	Forward	Sheffield United	21 July 2008	£1.75m	85/12	31	Queens Park Rangers	31 August 2010	£750k, rising to £1m
Kallum Keane	(Republic of Ireland)	36	Defender	Trainee	8 July 2010	Free	0	0	Contract Cancelled	27 January 2011	N/A
Mitchell Hanson	(England)	39	Defender	Trainee	1 July 2007	N/A	0/1	0	Contract Cancelled	27 January 2011	N/A
Graham Kelly	(Republic of Ireland)	40	Midfielder	Trainee	8 July 2010	N/A	0	0	Contract Cancelled	27 January 2011	N/A
Kris Commons	(Scotland) (Note: Commons was born in Mansfield, England, but also qualifies to represent Scotland internationally through his paternal grandmother and made his international debut for Scotland in August 2008.)	10	Midfielder	Unattached	2 June 2008	Free	82/16	24	Celtic	28 January 2011	£300k
Dean Moxey	(England)	21	Defender	Exeter City	26 June 2009	£300k, rising to £500k	52/6	2	Crystal Palace	31 January 2011	£400k
Medi Abalimba	(Republic of the Congo)	38	Midfielder	Southend United	20 August 2009	Undisclosed	0	0	Oldham Athletic	31 January 2011	Free

Loan

Player	Country	Squad number	Position	Loaned To	Date	Loan Duration
Lee Croft	(England)	—	Midfielder	Huddersfield Town	30 June 2010	Six Months
Graham Kelly	(Republic of Ireland)	40	Midfielder	Bray Wanderers	9 July 2010	18 Weeks
Greg Mills	(England)	--	Forward	AFC Telford United	5 Aug 2010	5 Months^{[I]}
Ross Atkins	(England)	30	Goalkeeper	Tamworth	12 Aug 2010	9 weeks^{[II]}
Luke Varney	(England)	22	Forward	Blackpool	27 Aug 2010	Season Long
Arnaud Mendy	(France)	24	Midfield	Tranmere Rovers	31 Aug 2010	Three Months^{[III]}
James Severn	(England)	31	Goalkeeper	Tamworth	15 Oct 2010	4 weeks
Ross Atkins	(England)	30	Goalkeeper	Tamworth	12 Nov 2010	Three months^{[IV]}
Dave Martin	(England)	16	Midfielder	Notts County	21 January 2011	Three month^{[V]}
Greg Mills	(England)	--	Forward	AFC Telford United	31 January 2011	3 Months
Stephen Bywater	(England)	1	Goalkeeper	Cardiff City	4 March 2011	Ten weeks
Ben Pringle	(England)	18	Midfielder	Torquay United	4 March 2011	19 Days^{[VI]}

Notes
I Mills originally joined Telford for four weeks, but this was later extended.
II Atkins originally joined Tamworth for four weeks, but this was later extended to five months. However, the absence of Stephen Bywater and Saul Deeney led to Atkins early recall.
III Mendy originally joined Tranmere for four weeks, but this was later extended.
IV Atkins originally joined Tamworth until the end of the campaign, but injuries to Stephen Bywater and Saul Deeney again led to an early recall.
IV Martin originally moved on a one-month deal, but this was extended for a further two months on 24 February 2011.
VI Pringle originally signed a one-month deal with Torquay, but it was cancelled by mutual consent after 19 days.

== Results ==
Win	Draw	Loss

=== Friendlies ===
On 12 February 2010 the club made its first announcement regarding the club's 2010–11 pre-season friendlies ahead with the confirmation of a match against Italian side ACF Fiorentina. However, the game was cancelled due to "unforeseen circumstances" and replaced with a match against Birmingham City. The club announced additional matches in the final week of April 2010 before completing its itinerary with the announcement of its participation in the first match at Chesterfield's new ground, B2net Stadium, on 20 May 2010.

Date	Competition	Opponent	Venue	Result	Scorers	Attendance'
17 July 2010	Friendly	Burton Albion	A	1–0	Leacock 26'	Unknown
19 July 2010	Friendly	Southend United	A	1–1	Hulse 10'	1,050
21 July 2010	Friendly	AFC Bournemouth	A	3–3	Commons 24', Green 37', Bailey 67'	Unknown
24 July 2010	Friendly	Chesterfield	A	5–4	Commons 12', 63' (pen.), Doyle 36', Porter 50', Brayford 61'	7, 550 (1,500 away fans)
27 July 2010	Friendly	Stoke City	H	1–0	Porter 7'	10,386
31 July 2010	Friendly	Birmingham City	H	1–2	Roberts 57'	4,458

=== Football League Championship ===
The fixtures for the 2010–11 Football League Championship season was announced on 17 June 2010, with the season beginning on 7 August 2010 and ending on 8 May 2011. The season opened with an away trip to Leeds United, a fixture which kicked off The Rams' 2004–05 season, and ends away to Reading.

Date	Match No.	Time	Opponent	Venue	Result	Scorers	Attendance	Referee	Pos.
7 August 2010	1	5.15pm	Leeds United	A	2–1	Hulse 13', Commons 27' (pen.)	26,761 (1,662 away fans)	N. Swarbrick (Lancashire)	9
14 August 2010	2	3.00pm	Cardiff City	H	1–2	Cwyka 25'	25,103 (896 away fans)	N. Miller (Co. Durham)	11
21 August 2010	3	12.15pm	Coventry City	A	1–2	Moxey 52'	13,169 (773 away fans)	E. Ilderton (Tyne and Wear)	14
28 August 2010	4	3.00pm	Queens Park Rangers	H	2–2	Commons 40', Bailey 69'	25,874 (1,655 away fans)	M. Haywood (Yorkshire)	15
11 September 2010	5	1.00pm	Sheffield United	H	0–1		25,749 (1,775 away fans)	P. Crossley (Kent)	18
14 September 2010	6	7.45pm	Hull City	A	0–2		19,714 (793 away fans)	D. Whitestone (Northampton)	22
18 September 2010	7	3.00pm	Barnsley	A	1–1	Leacock 14'	12,089 (1,179 away fans)	D. Webb (County Durham)	20
25 September 2010	8	3.00pm	Crystal Palace	H	5–0	Bueno 14', 62', Commons 41', Green 68', Kuqi 73',	25,258 (936 away fans)	A. Bates (Staffordshire)	19
28 September 2010	9	7.45pm	Middlesbrough	H	3–1	Barker 45+3', Commons 51', 60'	24,739 (710 away fans)	C. Pawson (South Yorkshire)	15
2 October 2010	10	3.00pm	Swansea City	A	0–0		15,071 (592 away fans)	P. Gibbs (West Midlands)	14
16 October 2010	11	3.00pm	Preston North End	H	3–0	Moxey 21', Bueno 32', Savage	26,117 (919 away fans)	A. D'urso (Essex)	13
19 October 2010	12	7.45pm	Doncaster Rovers	A	3–2	Moore 19', Commons 59', 72',	9,741 (1,733 away fans)	K. Evans(Lancashire)	7
23 October 2010	13	3.00pm	Millwall	A	0–2		12,024 (1,090 away fans)	G. Salisbury (Lancashire)	12
30 October 2010	14	3.00pm	Watford	H	4–1	Brayford 14', Cwyka 36', 81', Kuqi 65'	27,119 (1,078 away fans)	P. Tierney (Lancashire)	7
6 November 2010	15	5.20pm	Portsmouth	H	2–0	Savage, Green 58'	29,086 (1,023 away fans)	C. Webster (Tyne & Wear)	4
9 November 2010	16	7.45pm	Ipswich Town	A	2–0	Commons 58', 76'	17,572 (491 away fans)	R. East (Wiltshire)	4
13 November 2010	17	3.00pm	Leicester City	A	0–2		25,930 (3,321 away fans)	S. Tanner (Somerset)	4
20 November 2010	18	3.00pm	Scunthorpe United	H	3–2	Cwyka 3', Commons, Moore 59'	25,189 (739 away fans)	J. Linington (Isle of Wight)	4
27 November 2010	19	5.45pm	Burnley	A	1–2	Moore 19'	13,790 (640 away fans)	M. Haywood (W. Yorkshire)	4
4 December 2010	20	3.00pm	Norwich City	H	1–2	Commons 17'	26,134 (2,228 away fans)	K. Stroud (Hampshire)	7
11 December 2010	21	3.00pm	Bristol City	A	0–2		14,029 (1,052 away fans)	D. Sheldrake (Surrey)	7
18 December 2010	22	3.00pm	Reading	H	1–2	Commons 61'	24,514 (467 away fans)	D. Deadman (Cheshunt)	9
29 December 2010	23	19.45pm	Nottingham Forest	A	2–5	Moore 14', Commons 55'	29,490 (4,285 away fans)	A. Bates (Staffordshire)	12
1 January 2011	24	3.00pm	Preston North End	A	2–1	Porter 70', 84'	11,198 (1,090 away fans)	R. Madley (W. Yorkshire)	12
3 January 2011	25	3.00pm	Millwall	H	0–0		24,239 (609 away fans)	K. Wright (Cambridgeshire)	13
15 January 2011	26	3.00pm	Watford	A	0–3		12,917 (1,165 away fans)	G. Ward (Surrey)	14
22 January 2011	27	1.00pm	Nottingham Forest	H	0–1		33,010 (4,196 away fans)	G. Salisbury (Lancashire)	14
1 February 2011	28	7.45pm	Ipswich Town	H	1–2	Bueno 7'	23,159 (587 away fans)	C. Boyeson (East Yorkshire)	16
5 February 2011	29	3.00pm	Portsmouth	A	1–1	S.Davies 34'	14,555 (983 away fans)	N. Swarbrick (Lancashire)	17
12 February 2011	30	5.20pm	Leicester City	H	0–2		26,142 (2,724 away fans)	C. Webster (Tyne & Wear)	17
19 February 2011	31	3.00pm	Scunthorpe United	A	0–0		5,696 (1,332 away fans)	S. Mathieson (Cheshire)	18
22 February 2011	32	7.45pm	Hull City	H	0–1		24,533 (1,576 away fans)	K. Woolmer (Northamptonshire)	19
26 February 2011	33	3.00pm	Sheffield United	A	1–0	Robinson 27'	21,084 (2,546 away fans)	R. East (Wiltshire)	18
1 March 2011	34	7.45pm	Doncaster Rovers	H	1–3	S. Davies 90'	24,239 (623 away fans)	K.Hill (Hertfordshire)	19
5 March 2011	35	3.00pm	Barnsley	H	0–0		26,251 (1,204 away fans)	D. Deadman (Cheshunt)	18
8 March 2011	36	7.45pm	Middlesbrough	A	1–2	Ward	13,712 (312 away fans)	K. Evans (Lancashire)	19
12 March 2011	37	3.00pm	Swansea City	H	2–1	Williams (O.G.) 7', S.Davies 54'	25,341 (1,190 away fans)	G. Scott (Oxfordshire)	18
12 March 2011	38	3.00pm	Crystal Palace	A	2–2	Pearson 7', Ward 63'	14,686 (920 away fans)	J. Moss (W. Yorkshire)	17
2 April 2011	39	3.00pm	Cardiff City	A	1-4	Savage	22,254 (834 away fans)	J. Linington (Isle of Wight)	19
9 April 2011	40	3.00pm	Coventry City	H	2–2	S.Davies 41', Savage	25,546 (955 away fans)	R.Booth (Nottinghamshire)	19
12 April 2011	41	7.45pm	Leeds United	H	2–1	Ward 60', B.Davies 63'	27,252 (3,815 away fans)	G. Salisbury (Lancashire)	19
18 April 2011	42	7.45pm	Q.P.R.	A	0–0		16,745 (537 away fans)	D. Deadman (Cheshunt)	19
23 April 2011	43	3.00pm	Burnley	H	2-4	Robinson 6', Ward 31'	25,187 (1,093 away fans)	M. Russell (South Gloucestershire)	19
25 April 2011	44	7.45pm	Norwich City	A	2-3	S.Davies 54', Bueno 63'	26,078	A.Haines (London)	19
30 April 2011	45	3.00pm	Bristol City	H	0-2		25,745 (946 away fans)	I. Williamson (Berkshire)	19
7 May 2011	46	12.45pm	Reading	A	1-2	Ward 32'	21,902 (1,943 away fans)	P. Miller Bedfordshire	19

=== FA Cup ===
As a Football League Championship club, Derby joined the FA Cup at the third round stage in January 2011. They were given a draw away to non-league opposition for the second time in three years when they played the ESPN-televised tie away to Blue Square Premier team Crawley Town. Derby lost 2–1 in a result described as one of the "biggest shocks" in FA Cup history and the "most humiliating" result in "Derby County's history".

Date	Round	Time	Opponent	Venue	Result	Scorers	Attendance	Referee
10 January 2011	3rd Round	8.00pm	Crawley Town	A	1–2	Addison 63'	4,145 (651 away fans)	M. Haywood (W.Yorkshire)

=== Football League Cup ===
As a Football League Championship club, Derby entered the Football League Cup at the first round stage, which commenced the week starting 9 August 2010. The seeded and regionalised draw was made on 16 June 2010 with Derby, one of the Northern region's seeded teams, drawn against League Two side Crewe Alexandra, who they had never played in the competition before and had not met in any competition since a 5–1 win in the Football League Championship on 14 January 2006. The 2008–09 semi-finalists crashed out in the first round for the second successive season after a 46th minute Shaun Barker own goal condemned the Rams to a 1–0 defeat.

Date	Round	Time	Opponent	Venue	Result	Scorers	Attendance	Referee
10 August 2010	1st Round	7.45pm	Crewe Alexandra	A	0–1		3,778 (1,361 away fans)	C. Boyeson (East Yorkshire)

== Squad statistics ==
=== Appearances, goals and cards ===
Last Updated – 7 May 2011

No.	Pos.	Name	League		FA Cup		League Cup		Total		Discipline	
No.	Pos.	Name	Apps	Goals	Apps	Goals	Apps	Goals	Apps	Goals	Yellow card	Red card
1	GK	(England) Stephen Bywater	22	0	1	0	1	0	24	0	0	0
2	DF	(England) John Brayford	46	1	1	0	1	0	48	1	4	0
3	DF	(Wales) Gareth Roberts	24/2	0	1	0	0/1	0	25/3	0	4	1
4	MF	(Republic of Ireland) Paul Green	36	2	1	0	0	0	37	2	4	0
5	DF	(England) Shaun Barker	42/1	1	1	0	1	0	44/1	1	9	0
6	DF	(England) Dean Leacock	22/3	1	0	0	1	0	23/3	1	10	0
7	FW	(England) Steve Davies	14/6	5	0/1	0	0	0	14/7	5	1	0
8	MF	(Wales) Robbie Savage	37/3	4	1	0	1	0	39/3	4	13	0
9	FW	(England) Rob Hulse	1	1	0	0	0/1	0	1/1	1	1	0
9	FW	(Finland) Shefki Kuqi	8/4	2	0	0	0	0	8/4	2	0	0
9	FW	(England) Theo Robinson	8/5	2	0	0	0	0	8/5	2	0	0
10	MF	(Scotland) Kris Commons	25/1	13	1	0	1	0	27/1	13	4	0
10	FW	(Northern Ireland) Jamie Ward	13	5	0	0	0	0	13	5	1	1
11	MF	(Scotland) Stephen Pearson	21/9	1	0	0	0	0	21/9	1	3	0
12	FW	(England) Chris Porter	6/12	2	1	0	1	0	8/12	2	1	0
13	GK	(Republic of Ireland) Saul Deeney	0	0	0	0	0	0	0	0	0	0
14	DF	(Scotland) Russell Anderson	4/7	0	0	0	0	0	4/7	0	1	0
15	MF	(England) Dave Martin	0/2	0	0	0	0	0	0/2	0	0	0
16	MF	(England) James Bailey	33/3	1	1	0	1	0	35/3	1	4	0
17	DF	(England) Jake Buxton	0/1	0	0	0	0	0	0/1	0	0	0
18	MF	(England) Ben Pringle	3/12	0	1	0	1	0	5/12	0	0	0
19	FW	(Poland) Tomasz Cywka	21/10	4	0/1	0	1	0	22/11	4	2	0
20	DF	(England) Miles Addison	10/11	0	1	1	0	0	11/11	1	1	0
21	DF	(England) Dean Moxey	20/2	2	0/1	0	1	0	21/3	2	6	1
21	DF	(Spain) Daniel Ayala	16/1	0	0	0	0	0	16/1	0	5	0
22	FW	(England) Luke Varney	1	0	0	0	0	0	1	0	0	0
23	FW	(United States) Conor Doyle	5/8	0	0	0	0/1	0	5/9	0	0	0
24	MF	(Guinea-Bissau) Arnaud Mendy	0	0	0	0	0	0	0	0	0	0
25	DF	(Republic of Ireland) Mark O'Brien	0/2	0	0	0	0	0	0/2	0	0	0
26	FW	(England) Callum Ball	1/4	0	0	0	0	0	1/4	0	0	0
27	FW	(Spain) Alberto Bueno	25/4	5	0	0	0	0	25/5	4	4	0
28	FW	(England) Luke Moore	9/4	4	0	0	0	0	9/4	4	1	0
28	MF	(England) Ben Davies	10/3	1	0	0	0	0	10/3	1	1	0
29	MF	(Republic of Ireland) Jeff Hendrick	0/4	0	0	0	0	0	0/4	0	0	0
29	FW	(England) Ryan Noble	0/1	0	0	0	0	0	0/1	0	0	0
30	GK	(England) Ross Atkins	1	0	0	0	0	0	1	0	0	0
31	GK	(England) James Severn	0/1	0	0	0	0	0	0/1	0	0	0
33	GK	(England) Matt Duke	0	0	0	0	0	0	0	0	0	0
33	GK	(Australia) Brad Jones	7	0	0	0	0	0	7	0	0	0
34	GK	(England) Frank Fielding	16	0	0	0	0	0	16	0	0	0
36	FW	(England) Michael Boulding	0	0	0	0	0	0	0	0	0	0
36	DF	(Republic of Ireland) Kallum Keane	0	0	0	0	0	0	0	0	0	0
37	MF	(Republic of Ireland) Ryan Connolly	0	0	0	0	0	0	0	0	0	0
38	MF	(Republic of the Congo) Medi Abalimba	0	0	0	0	0	0	0	0	0	0
39	DF	(England) Mitchell Hanson	0	0	0	0	0	0	0	0	0	0
40	MF	(Republic of Ireland) Graham Kelly	0	0	0	0	0	0	0	0	0	0

== Records ==
=== Club ===
Record	Statistic	Dates(s)
Biggest Win	5–0 v Crystal Palace	18 September 2010
Biggest Defeat	2–5 v Nottingham Forest	29 December 2010
Consecutive Victories	3	31 October 2010 – 13 November 2010
Unbeaten Run	6	18 September 2010 – 23 October 2010
Consecutive Defeats	5	27 November 2010 – 1 January 2011
Winless Run	8	3 January 2011 – 26 February 2011

(The above statistics refer to league matches only)

=== Individuals ===
League

Most league appearances:

Pos	Player	Country	Apps (Subs)
1	John Brayford	(England)	46
2	Shaun Barker	(England)	42/1
3	Robbie Savage	(Wales)	37/3
4	Paul Green	(Republic of Ireland)	36
5	James Bailey	(England)	33/3

Most league Goals:

Pos	Player	Country	Goals
1	Kris Commons	(Scotland)	13
2	Alberto Bueno	(Spain)	5
=	Steve Davies	(England)	5
=	Jamie Ward	(Northern Ireland)	5
4	Tomasz Cywka	(Poland)	4

All competitions

Most appearances:

Pos	Player	Country	Apps (Subs)
1	John Brayford	(England)	48
2	Shaun Barker	(England)	44/1
3	Robbie Savage	(Wales)	39/3
4	James Bailey	(England)	35/3
5	Paul Green	(Republic of Ireland)	37

Pos	Player	Country	Goals
1	Kris Commons	(Scotland)	13
2	Alberto Bueno	(Spain)	5
=	Steve Davies	(England)	5
=	Jamie Ward	(Northern Ireland)	5
4	Tomasz Cywka	(Poland)	4

== Season Awards ==
Award	Player
Jack Stamps Player of the Year	John Brayford
Club Player of the Year	John Brayford
Supporter's Club Player of the Year	John Brayford
Sammy Crooks Young Player of the Year	James Bailey
Academy Player of the Year	Callum Ball
Scholar of the Year	Kwame Thomas
Goal of the Season	Ben Davies v Leeds United
Special Achievement	Robbie Savage

== Reserves ==
The fixtures for the 2010–11 The Central League Division One Central Section were announced on 9 July 2010, with the season beginning on 17 August 2010 and ending on 20 April 2011. The season opened with an away trip to Port Vale and will end at home to Barnsley. The reserve side will attempt to defend the title won the previous season, and moved to Belper Town's Christchurch Meadow ground, rather than Alfreton Town's Impact Arena where they had spent the previous two years, in an attempt to take the reserve team out across Derbyshire.

=== Results ===
Win Draw Loss Upcoming fixture

==== Pre-season ====
Date	Competition	Opponents	Home/ Away	Result F – A	Scorers	Attendance
23 July 2010	Friendly	Matlock Town	A	2–2	Hendrick 49', Chipperfield 53'	378
28 July 2010	Bass Charity Vase	Burton Albion	A	3–1	Varney 61', 64', Martin 68'	1,018
30 July 2010	Friendly	Solihull Moors	A	2–0	Varney 45', Doyle 50'	Unknown
3 August 2010	Friendly	Belper Town	A	1–1	Hulse 25'	810

==== Division One Central ====
Date	Match No.	K.O.	Opponents	Home/ Away	Full Time F – A	Derby Scorers	Att.	Pos
17 August 2010	1	7.00pm	Port Vale	A	1–5	Hendrick 51'	??	7
25 August 2010	2	7.00pm	Sheffield United	H	2–1	Ball 39', Doyle 55'	350	5
8 September 2010	3	7.00pm	Barnsley	A	6–2	Ball 7', Hendrick 25', 49', Doyle 30', Pringle 73', Richards 88'	??	3
22 September 2010	4	2.00pm	Bradford City	H	1–0	Doyle 43'	??	2
12 October 2010	5	7.00pm	Rotherham United	A	1–3	Ball 12'	??	4
26 October 2010	6	7.00pm	Sheffield Wednesday	A	1–0	Doyle 30'	??	3
17 November 2010	7	7.00pm	Nottingham Forest	H	1–2	Pearson 30'	??	5
12 January 2011	8	7.00pm	Rotherham United	H	2–0	Mills 21', Ball 75'	150	4
2 March 2011	9	7.00pm	Sheffield Wednesday	H	2–0	Porter 9', Doyle 53'	174	3
16 March 2011	10	7.00pm	Port Vale	H	2–1	Croft 78', B.Davies 83'	235	3
22 March 2011	11	7.00pm	Bradford City	A	2–1	B. Davies 14', Porter 33'	??	1
29 March 2011	12	2.00pm	Nottingham Forest	A	7-1	Halpin, Robinson 38', 77', Ball 54', Cwyka 67'	705	1
13 April 2011	13	7.00pm	Barnsley	H	3-0	Porter 4', 60', Doyle 36'	??	1
3 May 2011	14	7.00pm	Sheffield United	A	4-0	Porter 7', 47', 63', Croft 20'	??	1

==== Totesport Cup ====
Date	Round	K.O.	Opponents	Home/ Away	Result F – A	Scorers
20 October 2010	Group Stage	2.00pm	Rotherham United	H	3–3	Doyle 6', Ball 20', 69'
10 November 2010	Group Stage	7.00pm	Lincoln City	A	1–4	Dillon 51'
9 February 2011	Group Stage	7.00pm	Walsall	A	2–0	Pringle 22', Boulding 71'

==== Derbyshire Senior Cup ====
Derby entered the 2011 Derbyshire Senior Cup for the first time in 25 years and were given a bye to the 3rd round of the competition. A 14–1 thrashings of Shirebrook Town set the tone for Derby's role in the competition, as they scored 24 goals on their way to victory in the competition to earn the reserves second piece of silverware in two seasons.

Date	Round	K.O.	Opponents	Home/ Away	Result F – A	Scorers
5 January 2011	3rd Round	7.45pm	Shirebrook Town	H	14–1	Pringle, Martin 21', Hendrick, Cywka, Addison (??), Davies (??), Davey (O.G.) (??), Ball, Witham (??)
19 January 2011	Quarter-finals	7.45pm	Chesterfield	H^{[I]}	3–3 (a.e.t.); 4–1 (Pens)	Cole 85', Hendrick 87', Cwyka
16 February 2011	Semi-finals	7.45pm	Glapwell	A	2–0	Boulding 19', Ayala 37'
20 April 2011	Final	7.45pm	Buxton	N	5-0	Ball 2', Hendrick 15', 90', Doyle 30', Cole 73'

=== Player statistics ===
Pos.	Name	League		Tote Cup		DS Cup		Total	
Pos.	Name	Apps	Goals	Apps	Goals	Apps	Goals	Apps	Goals
MF	(Republic of the Congo) Abalimba	1	0	0	0	0	0	1	0
MF	(England) Addison	4	0	0	0	2	1	6	1
DF	(Scotland) Anderson	6	0	1	0	1	0	8	0
GK	(England) Atkins	5	0	1	0	1	0	7	0
DK	(Spain) Ayala	0	0	0	0	1	1	1	1
MF	(England) Bailey	3	0	0	0	0	0	3	0
FW	(England) Ball	10/4	5	3	2	2/2	3	15/6	10
FW	(England) Bennett	0/1	0	0	0	0	0	0/1	0
FW	(England) Boulding	4	0	1	1	1	1	6	2
FW	(Spain) Bueno	1	0	1	0	1	0	3	0
DF	(England) Buxton	2	0	0	0	2	0	4	0
GK	(England) Bywater	1	0	0	0	0	0	1	0
DF	(England) Cole	6/5	0	2/1	0	2/1	2	10/7	2
MF	(Republic of Ireland) Connolly	0/1	0	0	0	0	0	0/1	0
FW	(England) Cowan-Hall	1	0	0	0	0	0	1	0
MF	(England) Croft	7	2	1	0	3	0	11	2
FW	(Poland) Cwyka	2	1	0	0	2	3	4	4
MF	(England) B. Davies	3	2	0	0	0	0	3	2
FW	(England) S. Davies	0	0	0	0	2	1	2	1
GK	(Republic of Ireland) Deeney	5	0	2	0	3	0	10	0
FW	(Republic of Ireland) Dillon	0/1	0	1	1	1	0	2/1	1
FW	(United States) Doyle	9	6	2	1	3	1	14	8
GK	(England) Duke	2	0	0	0	0	0	2	0
MF	(Wales) Evans	0/1	0	1	0	2	0	3/1	0
DF	(Poland) Galinski	4/4	0	2	0	0/1	0	6/5	0
DF	(England) Garton	1	0	0	0	0	0	1	0
DF	(England) Hanson	2	0	1	0	0	0	3	0
MF	(England) Halpin	1	3	0	0	0	0	1	3

Pos.	Name	League		Tote Cup		DS Cup		Total	
Pos.	Name	Apps	Goals	Apps	Goals	Apps	Goals	Apps	Goals
DF	(Republic of Ireland) Hegarty	0/3	0	0/1	0	0	0	0/4	0
MF	(Republic of Ireland) Hendrick	11	3	3	0	4	6	18	9
DF	(United States) Holden	1	0	1	0	0	0	2	0
DF	(England) Jones	4/4	0	1/1	0	0/1	0	5/6	0
DF	(Republic of Ireland) Keane	3/2	0	1	0	1	0	5/2	0
MF	(Republic of Ireland) Kelly	0/1	0	0	0	0	0	0/1	0
DF	(England) Leacock	6	0	1	0	3	0	10	0
MF	(England) Martin	7	0	1	0	1	1	9	1
FW	(England) McElroy	0	0	0/2	0	0	0	0/2	0
MF	(Guinea-Bissau) Mendy	2	0	0	0	1	0	3	0
FW	(England) Mills	1	1	0	0	1	0	2	1
DF	(England) Moxey	2	0	0	0	0	0	2	0
FW	(England) Noble	1	0	0	0	0	0	1	0
DF	(Republic of Ireland) O'Brien	5/1	0	2	0	0/1	0	7/2	0
DF	(England) Okai	0/1	0	0	0	0	0	0/1	0
FW	(England) Porter	5	7	1	0	1	0	7	7
FW	(Scotland) Pearson	2	1	0	0	0	0	2	1
MF	(England) Pringle	9	1	2	1	4	2	15	4
MF	(England) Richards	0/6	1	0/1	0	0	0	0/7	1
FW	(England) Robinson	2	2	0	0	0	0	2	2
DF	(Wales) Roberts	3	0	0	0	1	0	4	0
DF	(Wales) Rowe-Turner	1	0	0	0	0	0	1	0
DF	(England) Sansara	1	0	0	0	0	0	1	0
GK	(England) Severn	1	0	0	0	0	0	1	0
MF	(Australia) Sunasky	1	0	0	0	0	0	1	0
MF	(England) Victor	1	0	0	0	0	0	1	0
MF	(England) Witham	4/6	0	1/2	0	0/4	1	5/12	1

Preceded by 2009–10	Derby County seasons 2010–11	Succeeded by 2011–12
