= Miles Addison =

English footballer

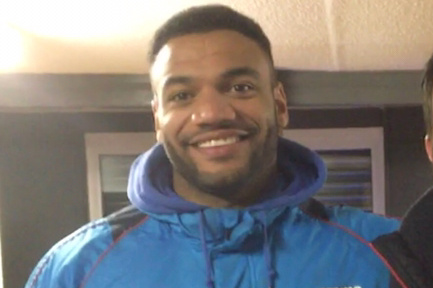
- Addison in 2019

Personal information
- Full name: Miles Vivien Esifi Addison
- Date of birth: 7 January 1989 (age 37)
- Place of birth: Newham, England
- Height: 6 ft 2 in (1.88 m)
- Positions: Defender; midfielder

Youth career
- ?–2006: Derby County

Senior career*
Years	Team	Apps	(Gls)
2006–2012	Derby County	65	(3)
2011–2012	→ Barnsley (loan)	11	(0)
2012	→ AFC Bournemouth (loan)	14	(1)
2012–2015	AFC Bournemouth	20	(0)
2014	→ Rotherham United (loan)	6	(0)
2014	→ Scunthorpe United (loan)	3	(0)
2015	→ Blackpool (loan)	6	(0)
2015–2016	Peterborough United	3	(1)
2016–2017	Kilmarnock	17	(1)
2018–2020	Nuneaton Borough	36	(4)
2020–2021	Stratford Town	0	(0)
Total		181	(9)

International career
2009	England U21	1	(0)
- * Club domestic league appearances and goals

Miles Vivien Esifi Addison (born 7 January 1989) is an English former footballer who played as a defender.

== Club career ==
=== Derby County ===
Though born in London, Addison moved to Nottingham at the age of three, where he was spotted by scouts from the Derby County youth system when he was playing for Clifton All Whites FC. Addison was handed his first team debut by interim manager Terry Westley, who he had worked closely with in the youth and reserve teams, towards the end of the 2005–06 season, in the 1–1 Championship draw with Hull City on 17 April 2006, where he played in the centreback position alongside side another academy graduate Lewin Nyatanga. He kept his place for the following match, a 2–0 defeat away to Ipswich five days later.

With the appointment of Billy Davies as Derby manager, Addison found himself frozen out of the first team at Derby and didn't appear in the starting eleven again until Davies' successor, Paul Jewell, gave him a surprise start, again at centreback, in a 3–1 defeat away to Blackburn Rovers in the penultimate game of the 2007–08 Premier League season.

Derby's poor start to the 2008–09 season saw Addison given a chance to cement a place in the first team and he was given his first start of the campaign in the 1–0 League Cup win at Preston North End on 26 August 2008. Starting in his preferred position of central midfield for the first time, Addison impressed enough to retain his place for the subsequent match away to Barnsley. This was the start of a run of 15 consecutive appearances in the first team, which was only ended when suspension for reaching five yellow cards ruled him out of the League Cup 4th round tie against Leeds United. Addison formed a formidable midfield partnership with Paul Green during this time as the Rams embarked on a run of only two defeats in 13 matches and moved from the bottom of the table to the fringes of the playoff places. Addison's form earned high praise from Jewell as an example to the club's other academy players and saw him sign a new three-and-a-half-year deal with the club on 2 September to keep him at the club until 2011. November saw Addison linked with a £2 million move to Premier League Stoke. However, Jewell denied this, saying "I spoke to Tony (Pulis, Stoke manager) about another matter and he never mentioned it. We are not going to sell Miles Addison. He won't be getting sold. Everybody has their price I guess, but we have worked too hard over the past year and gone through too many tortures to now start selling our best players". Addison was denied his first goal for the club in the controversial East Midlands derby on 2 November 2008 when Stuart Attwell incorrectly ruled two late Addison headers which would have given Derby a 2–1 win, with the match instead finishing 1–1. but eventually got his first professional goal with the second in a 3–0 home win over Sheffield Wednesday on 15 November 2008. On 20 December 2008, he captained the side for the whole game against Watford, as the result ended in a 1–0 win. Addison said "it was a dream to captain the side who I support". Addison was substituted during Derby's 4–1 win over Blackpool, an injury which was later diagnosed to be a stress fracture of his foot, which ruled him out for the rest of the 2008–09 season. Despite missing the latter part of the campaign Addison's form was such that he won the Sammy Crooks Trophy – Derby County's Young Player of the Season award – for the 2008–09 season.

Addison had a great start to the 2009–10 season with goals against Peterborough United and Plymouth Argyle, but a succession of foot problems restricted him to just five starts between October 2009 and February 2010 and he underwent specialist surgery in America. The surgery was successful but he was ruled out for the remainder of Derby's 2009–10 season as well as the entirety of the 2010–11 campaign. However, Addison made a quicker than expected recovery, with Clough suggesting he may be back in first team action as early as January 2011. He was pencilled in to play a reserve game against Sheffield Wednesday on 26 October 2010, but was later withdrawn as a precaution after admitting he felt "a bit stiff". He eventually took to the pitch in a competitive capacity when he came on as an 81st-minute substitute in a 2–0 home win over Portsmouth on 6 November 2010, his first appearance in 10 months, as Derby reached 4th in the table. However, he suffered another injury after an operation on his foot and was sidelined for six weeks. Then, on 1 January 2011, he returned to the first team, where he came on as a late substitute, in a 2–1 win over Preston North End. He then scored his first goal of the season on 10 January 2011, in a 2–1 loss against Crawley Town in the third round of the FA Cup.

On 21 June 2011, Addison signed a contract extension, extending his stay at Pride Park until summer 2013.

==== Loan at Barnsley ====
On 24 June 2011, Addison joined fellow Championship club, Barnsley on six-month loan deal.

He made his Barnsley debut, where he started the whole game, in a 0–0 draw against Nottingham Forest in the opening game of the season. However, he found himself behind the pecking order in the first team throughout his time at the club. Despite this, Addison's loan was extended until 28 January 2012. Addison returned to Derby in January 2012 after making 13 appearances for Barnsley, 11 of which were starts.

==== Loan at AFC Bournemouth ====
After his loan spell finish at Barnsley, Addison found first-team appearances hard to come by at Pride Park due to the form of central defenders Shaun Barker and Jason Shackell. On 21 February 2012, Addison joined Football League One side AFC Bournemouth on loan until the end of the season. Following his loan move to Bournemouth, Addison hinted that he would be open to a permanent move and said his calling his treatment by Derby as "strange".

On 25 February 2012, Addison made his first start, where he played 90 minutes for Bournemouth in a 1–0 loss against MK Dons. On 10 March 2012, Addison scored an own goal to put Sheffield Wednesday, in a 3–0 loss against Sheffield Wednesday. In a follow-up match against Carlisle United on 17 March 2012, Addison scored his first goal for Bournemouth in the 83rd minute in a 1–1 draw to end a run of five defeats for Bournemouth. On 13 April 2012, Addison expressed an interest to make his move to Bournemouth permanent. Addison featured 14 times for Bournemouth, who ended the season 11th as their play-off hopes faded in April.

Upon his return to Derby, Bournemouth stated their interest in making the transfer permanent in the summer and on 22 May 2012, Addison was transfer listed by the club with a year left on his contract. As well as Bournemouth there was reported interest from several Championship clubs according to Nigel Clough. It came after when Derby manager Nigel Clough said on 16 April 2012, that Addison was free to leave the club, stating the form of Craig Bryson, Jeff Hendrick, Mark O'Brien, Jake Buxton and Jason Shackell as the reason, with Bournemouth stating an interest in a permanent deal.

=== AFC Bournemouth ===
On 12 July 2012, Addison joined Bournemouth for an undisclosed fee.

At the start of the 2012–13 season, Addison captained the side in number of matches following the departure of Adam Barrett. His captaincy lasted halfway through between the start of the season and November. He also formed a central–defence partnership with Tommy Elphick. Addison continued to captain the side until he suffered a foot injury in the beginning of December. Initially out for three–four weeks, he was eventually sidelined for the rest of the 2012–13 season. Despite this, Addison was involved in the squad that saw Bournemoiuth promoted to the Championship for next season, as he made twenty–two appearances in all competitions.

However, over the next two seasons at Bournemouth, Addison found his first team opportunities at the club hard to come by and appeared on the substitute bench. At the end of the 2014–15 season, Addison was released by the club upon expiry of his contract.

==== Loan Spells from Bournemouth ====
Having been told by Manager Eddie Howe that he was expecting to be loaned out to fight for his first team place, Addison joined Rotherham United on loan until the end of the season on 6 January 2014. He made his Rotherham United debut, where he started the whole game, in a 4–2 win over Crewe Alexandra on 11 January 2014. Although he was featured in the starting lineup in number of matches, Addison was soon sidelined out of the first team, due to fallen out of favour and his own injury concern. After the club was promoted to the Championship for next season, Addison went on to make six appearances in all competitions.

On 28 July 2014, Addison joined Scunthorpe United on a one-month loan deal. He made his Scunthorpe United debut, where he came on as a substitute, in a 1–0 loss against Blackburn Rovers in the first round of the League Cup. Seven days later, on 19 August 2014, Addison started the whole game in the centre–back position, in a 2–0 loss against Fleetwood Town. However, he suffered an injury during a 2–1 win over Walsall on 30 August 2014 and his loan spell with the club was terminated shortly after, as he went on to make five appearances for the side.

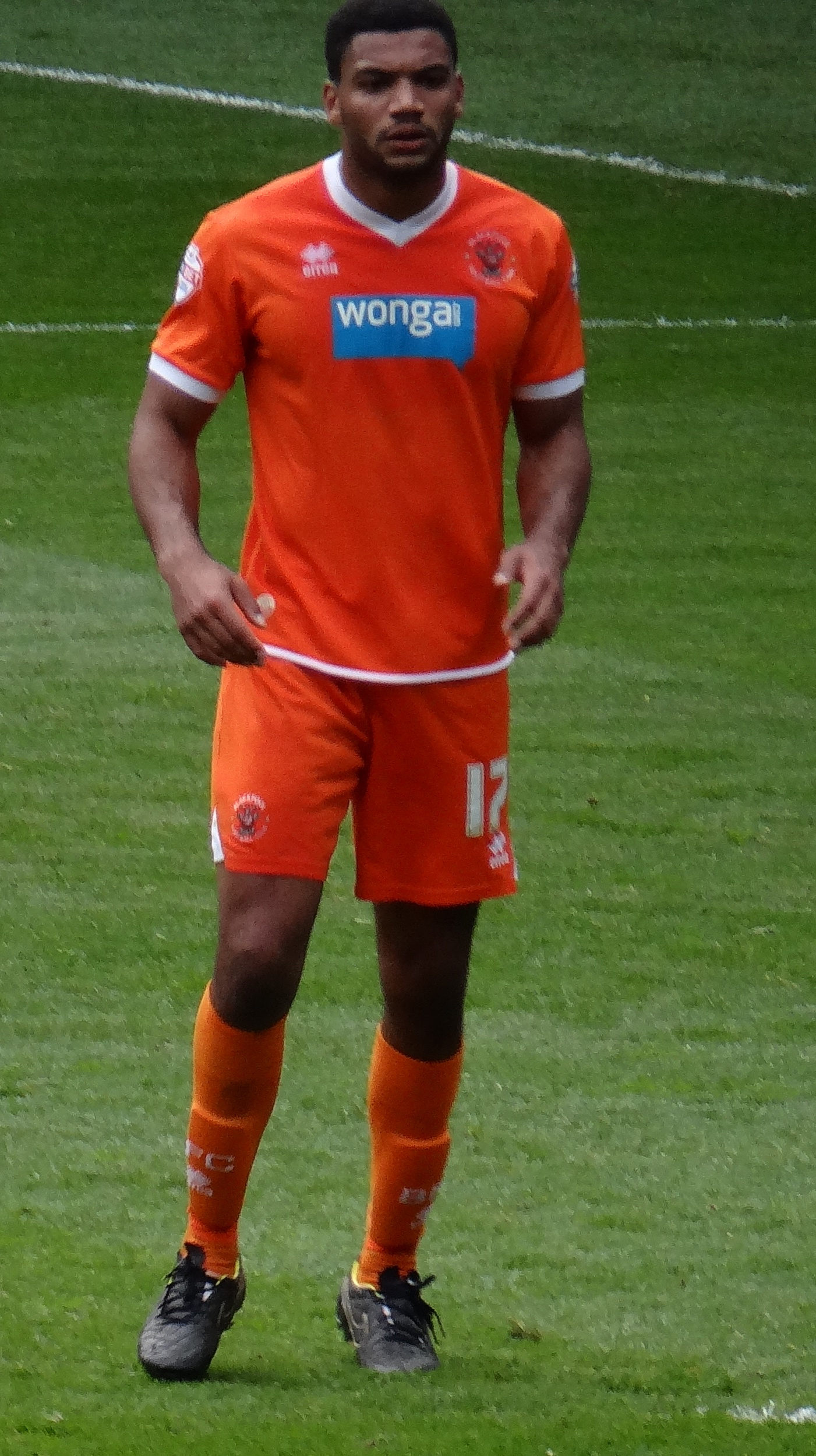
Addison playing for Blackpool in 2015.

After being told by Bournemouth that he was going to be loaned out once again, Addison joined Blackpool on loan for one month. On the same day, Addison made his Blackpool debut, where he started the whole game, in a 1–0 loss against Birmingham City. On 1 April 2015, Addison had his loan spell at Blackpool extended until the end of the season. He later played three times in defensive midfield position and two times in centre–back position. Despite missing out six matches during his loan spell at Blackpool, as they were relegated to League One, Addison went on to make six appearances for Blackpool and returned to his parent club at the end of the season.

=== Peterborough United ===
On 24 November 2015, Addison signed for Peterborough United on a short-term contract.

Later on the same day, Addison scored on his debut against former club Barnsley in a 3–2 win. A month later, he signed a one–month contract extension with the club. He went on to make two appearances (three in total) before being released by the club in late–January.

=== Kilmarnock ===
On 30 March 2016, Addison signed for Scottish Premiership side Kilmarnock, agreeing a contract until the end of the season.

Addison made his Kilmarnock debut, where he started the whole game, in a 0–0 draw against Partick Thistle on 2 April 2016, keeping a clean sheet. He also kept another clean sheet in a follow up match against St. Johnstone, which they won 3–0. Since joining the club, he quickly established himself in the starting eleven to help the club fight to avoid relegation. He scored his first goal for the club on 22 May 2016 as Killie beat Falkirk 4–0 in the second leg of the Premiership play-off final at Rugby Park. At the end of the 2015–16 season, Addison went on to make eight appearances for the side.

Ahead of the 2016–17 season, Addison was keen on staying at the club, which he eventually signed a three–year contract, keeping him until 2019. In the 2016–17 season, Addison continued to be a first team regular for the side and was given the vice–captaincy role. He then suffered ankle injury during a 2–0 loss against Ross County on 26 August 2016 that saw him sidelined for a month. It wasn't until on 5 October 2016 when he returned to the first team from injury, coming on as a late substitute, in a 4–0 defeat to Aberdeen. Then, on 22 October 2016, Addison captained the side for the first time in four years, in a 1–1 draw against Inverness Caledonian Thistle. However, he suffered a foot injury that he sustained in late–November and was sidelined until late–January after surgery. He returned in mid–February and made two more appearances, including against Aberdeen on 19 February 2017, where he was at fault for conceding two goals, in a 2–1 defeat. Following this, Addison never played for the club again for the rest of the season and was released in the latter part of the 2016–17 season.

=== Nuneaton Borough ===
In June 2018, Addison joined Nuneaton Borough of the National League North.

Addison made his Nuneaton Borough debut, where he started the whole game, in a 0–0 draw against Ashton United, keeping a clean sheet in the process. In the next two matches, he helped the side keep two more clean sheets and conceded one goal. He captained the side for the first time on 27 August 2018, where the side lose 3–1 against Brackley Town.

=== Stratford ===
In October 2020, Addison joined Southern Football League side Stratford Town.

=== Retirement ===
In an October 2021 interview to The Athletic, Addison stated that he had retired from football.

== International career ==
Addison was called up to the England under-21 for the team's UEFA U21 European Championship Qualification games against FYR Macedonia and Greece on 27 August 2009. Addison came on as a substitute against Greece to earn his first international cap.

== Career statistics ==
As of 29 December 2019

Appearances and goals by club, season and competition
Club	Season	League		Cup		League Cup		Other		Total	
Club	Season	Apps	Goals	Apps	Goals	Apps	Goals	Apps	Goals	Apps	Goals
Derby County	2005–06	4	0	0	0	0	0	0	0	2	0
Derby County	2006–07	0	0	0	0	0	0	0	0	0	0
Derby County	2007–08	1	0	0	0	0	0	0	0	1	0
Derby County	2008–09	28	1	3	1	5	0	0	0	36	2
Derby County	2009–10	23	2	2	0	1	0	0	0	16	2
Derby County	2010–11	31	0	1	1	0	0	0	0	22	1
Derby County	2011–12	0	0	0	0	0	0	0	0	0	0
Derby County	Total	87	3	6	2	6	0	0	0	77	5
Barnsley (loan)	2011–12	11	0	1	0	1	0	0	0	13	0
AFC Bournemouth (loan)	2011–12	14	1	0	0	0	0	0	0	14	1
AFC Bournemouth	2012–13	30	0	0	0	1	0	1	0	22	0
AFC Bournemouth	2013–14	0	0	0	0	0	0	0	0	0	0
AFC Bournemouth	2014–15	0	0	0	0	0	0	0	0	0	0
AFC Bournemouth	Total	44	0	0	0	1	0	1	0	22	0
Rotherham United (loan)	2013–14	6	0	0	0	0	0	0	0	6	0
Scunthorpe United (loan)	2014–15	3	0	0	0	2	0	0	0	5	0
Blackpool (loan)	2014–15	6	0	0	0	0	0	0	0	6	0
Peterborough United	2015–16	3	1	0	0	0	0	0	0	3	1
Kilmarnock	2015–16	6	0	0	0	0	0	2	1	8	1
Kilmarnock	2016–17	11	0	0	0	4	0	0	0	15	0
Kilmarnock	Total	17	0	0	0	4	0	2	1	23	1
Nuneaton Borough	2018–19	32	4	—		—		—		32	4
Nuneaton Borough	2019–20	4	0	0	0	—		—		4	0
Nuneaton Borough	Total	36	4	0	0	—		0	0	36	4
Career total		181	9	7	2	14	0	3	1	205	12

== Personal life ==
In May 2013, Addison was fined for £1,185 for driving under an influence and was banned from driving for 18 months.

== Honours ==
Individual

- Derby County's Sammy Crooks Young Player of the Year Award : 2008–09
