= Ross Atkins =

English footballer (born 1989)

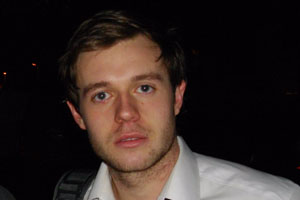
- Atkins in 2011

Personal information
- Full name: Ross Michael Atkins
- Date of birth: 3 November 1989 (age 37)
- Place of birth: Derby, England
- Height: 6 ft 0 in (1.83 m)
- Position: Goalkeeper

Youth career
- 2005–2009: Alfreton Town

Senior career*
Years	Team	Apps	(Gls)
2008–2014	Derby County	1	(0)
2008	→ Southport (loan)	4	(0)
2010	→ Burton Albion (loan)	0	(0)
2010	→ Kidderminster Harriers (loan)	10	(0)
2010	→ Tamworth (loan)	15	(0)
2010–2011	→ Tamworth (loan)	14	(0)
2011–2012	→ Burton Albion (loan)	45	(0)
2012–2013	→ Burton Albion (loan)	4	(0)
2013–2014	→ Alfreton Town (loan)	18	(0)
2014	→ Crawley Town (loan)	0	(0)
2014	Gresley		
2014–2015	Leamington	13	(0)
2015–2019	Mickleover Sports		

International career
2006	England U18	1	(0)
2007	England U19	1	(0)
- * Club domestic league appearances and goals

Ross Michael Atkins (born 3 November 1989) is an English former football goalkeeper and current coach.

== Playing career ==
=== Club career ===
Born in Derby Atkins came up through the youth system at Championship club Derby County and was sent out on loan to Conference North side Southport on loan on 30 October 2008, he made 5 appearances for Southport, 4 of them in the league (3 starts + 1 substitute appearance), with a Conference League Cup appearance. Atkins was named in the matchday squad for the first time as an unused substitute in Derby's 2–1 win over Coventry in November 2009. Atkins then spent a month on loan at Burton Albion in January 2010 without making an appearance. A second loan spell of the season saw him move to Conference National side Kidderminster Harriers for another month-long spell which was initially extended for the remainder of the season. Atkins made his first team debut and kept a clean sheet for the Harriers in a 3–0 win over Histon and made 13 appearances for the Harriers, playing in both FA Trophy Semi-finals matches against Stevenage Borough, before an injury to first choice Derby keeper Stephen Bywater saw him recalled to act as cover for Saul Deeney for the remaining two games of the season. He signed a new one-year deal with Derby on 23 April 2010.

On 10 August 2010, Atkins agreed to join Conference National side Tamworth on a month's loan, which was later extended until January 2011. After being an ever-present in Tamworth's opening 15 games of the season, Atkins was recalled to Derby after injury to Stephen Bywater and Saul Deeney's absence due to compassionate leave left the Derby short of goalkeepers. Following the loan signing for Frank Fielding and the recall of James Severn from Tamworth, Atkins was once again sent on loan to the Conference National side, this time until the end of the season However, in February 2011, Derby were again compromised by fresh injuries to both Stephen Bywater and Saul Deeney and Atkins was again recalled from Tamworth. He mainly played the role of understudy to loan goalkeepers Frank Fielding & Brad Jones, but after some sub-par performances from Jones and criticism by Clough in a 2–0 defeat against Bristol City Clough hinted that he had considered starting Atkins in the game and stated that he was under consideration to start against Reading, the final game of the season. On 7 May 2011, Atkins did make his first team debut in a 2–1 defeat at Reading. Despite the result, Atkins stated that he enjoyed his first team debut. Derby confirmed their intention to offer Atkins a new contract at the club at the end of the 2010–11 season.

During pre-season ahead of the 2011–12 season, Atkins trained with Burton Albion with a view to a possible season long-loan move. After impressing in training and pre-season games, Atkins completed a season-long loan move to Burton Albion on 29 July 2011, with Burton manager Paul Peschisolido praising his efforts in pre-season. Atkins started every Burton Albion game throughout the season bar one, when Adam Legzdins also joined on loan from Derby to play in a game against Northampton Town in March 2012, but Atkins returned to the team as Legzdins picked up a thigh injury in training.

At the end of the season, Atkins had a clause activated on his contract which extended his stay at Derby County until the end of the 2012–13 season. He then rejoined Burton on another season-long loan in July 2012. Atkins started the season as first choice, starting in Burton's opening seven games of season, however he was substituted at half time for Dean Lyness in the Football League Trophy game at Coventry City. After this games, Burton signed ex-Port Vale goalkeeper Stuart Tomlinson, with Burton manager Gary Rowett being dissatisfied with the performances of Atkins and Dean Lyness. After Tomlinson started ahead of Atkins in a 1–0 win over Rochdale at Spotland on 8 September 2012, Burton assistant manager Kevin Summerfield said that "the biggest difference for me was that we were playing the game in their half and they were defending corners because he [Tomlinson] can kick the ball so far up the pitch". Atkins slipped to third choice behind Tomlinson and Lyness and his loan was terminated early on 15 January 2013.

During the 2012–13 post season, it was reported by the Derby Telegraph that Atkins was close to joining fellow Derbyshire club Alfreton Town on loan. As a result, Atkins contract at Derby was extended to 2014. Atkins season-long loan to Alfreton Town was confirmed on 1 July.

Derby decided to bring Atkins back on 3 January 2014 by activating a recall clause in his season-long loan. On 31 January 2014, Atkins was sent back out on loan again this time to Crawley Town on an emergency loan. He was released by Derby at the end of the season.

Ross joined Northern Premier League Division One South side Gresley on 25 September 2014. Atkins made his debut at home on the following Saturday. Gresley won 4–2 against Rainworth Miners Welfare.

In December 2014 he signed for Conference North side Leamington, and then Mickleover Sports in March 2015.

=== International career ===
Atkins has been capped once at under-18 & under-19 level for England in 2006 and 2007 respectively.

== Coaching career ==
After his playing career ended, Atkins started coaching Derby County's academy. As of 2023 he was working as the lead academy goalkeeping coach. On 14 March 2025 he was announced as Head of Goalkeeping at Wycombe Wanderers.

== Career statistics ==
Appearances and goals by club, season and competition
Club	Season	League			FA Cup		League Cup		Other		Total	
Club	Season	Division	Apps	Goals	Apps	Goals	Apps	Goals	Apps	Goals	Apps	Goals
Derby County	2008–09	Championship	0	0	0	0	0	0	—		0	0
Derby County	2009–10	Championship	0	0	0	0	0	0	—		00	0
Derby County	2010–11	Championship	1	0	0	0	0	0	—		01	0
Derby County	2011–12	Championship	0	0	0	0	0	0	—		0	0
Derby County	2012–13	Championship	0	0	0	0	0	0	—		0	0
Derby County	2013–14	Championship	0	0	0	0	0	0	0	0	0	0
Derby County	Total		1	0	0	0	0	0	0	0	1	0
Southport (loan)	2008–09	Conference North	4	0	0	0	—		1 (Note: Appearance in the Conference League Cup)	0	5	0
Burton Albion (loan)	2009–10	League Two	0	0	0	0	0	0	0	0	0	0
Burton Albion (loan)	2011–12	League Two	45	0	1	0	1	0	1 (Note: Appearance in the Football League Trophy)	0	48	0
Burton Albion (loan)	2012–13	League Two	4	0	0	0	2	0	1	0	7	0
Burton Albion (loan)	Total		49	0	1	0	3	0	2	0	55	0
Kidderminster Harriers (loan)	2009–10	Conference Premier	10	0	0	0	—		3 (Note: Appearances in the FA Trophy)	0	13	0
Tamworth (loan)	2010–11	Conference Premier	29	0	1	0	—		0	0	30	0
Alfreton Town (loan)	2013–14	Conference Premier	18	0	2	0	—		0	0	20	0
Gresley FC	2014–15	Northern Premier League Division One South	5	0	0	0	0	0	1	0	6	0
Career total			116	0	4	0	3	0	8	0	130	0

== Honours ==
- The Central League Central Division Champions: 2009–10
