= Dean Leacock =

English footballer (born 1984)

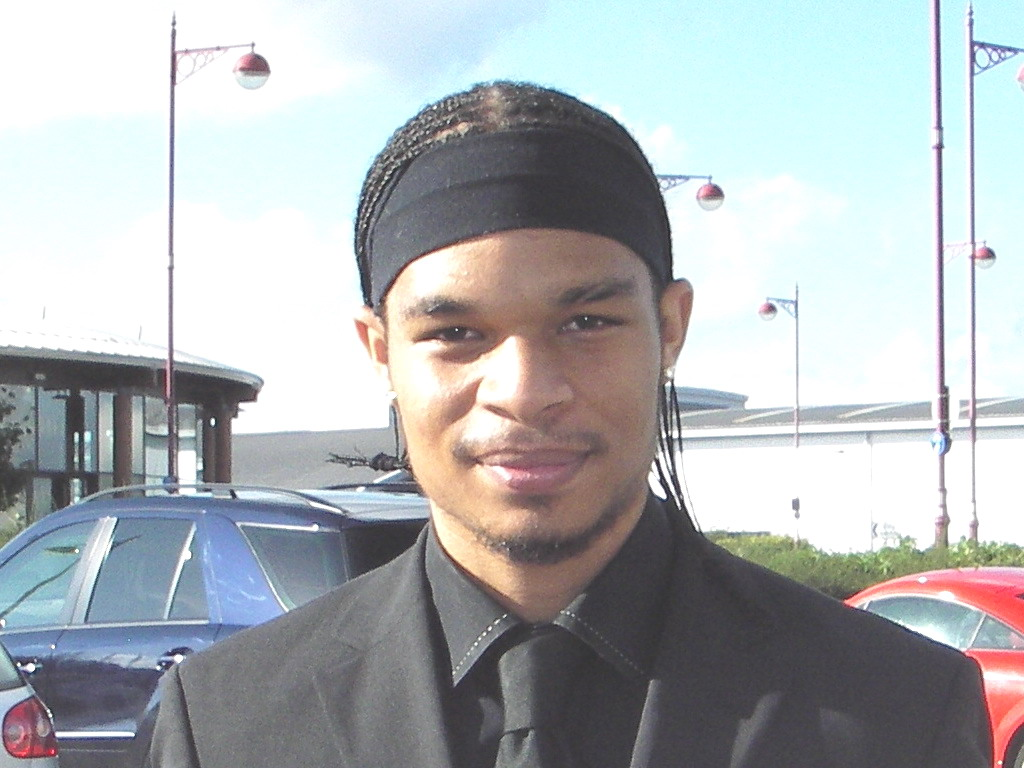
- Leacock in 2006

Personal information
- Full name: Dean Leacock
- Date of birth: 10 June 1984 (age 42)
- Place of birth: Croydon, London, England
- Height: 6 ft 3 in (1.91 m)
- Positions: Defender; midfielder

Youth career
- ?–2001: Fulham

Senior career*
Years	Team	Apps	(Gls)
2001–2006	Fulham	9	(0)
2004	→ Coventry City (loan)	8	(0)
2005	→ Coventry City (loan)	5	(0)
2006–2012	Derby County	117	(1)
2012	Leyton Orient	15	(0)
2012–2014	Notts County	68	(2)
2014–2015	Crawley Town	23	(1)
2015–2016	Whitehawk	16	(1)
2016	Welling United	6	(0)
2016	Billericay Town	1	(0)
2017–2018	Lowestoft Town	16	(0)
Total		284	(5)

International career
2002	England U18	3	(0)
2003	England U19	2	(0)
2003	England U20	2	(0)
- * Club domestic league appearances and goals

Dean Leacock (born 10 June 1984) is an English former professional footballer. He was primarily a centre-back, but could play as a right back or defensive midfielder.

== Career ==
=== Fulham ===
Born in Croydon, London, Leacock signed his first professional contract on a three-year deal. At the time, he was known as an up-and-coming central defender, tipped by many to become the new Rio Ferdinand. Leacock made his professional debut as an eighteen-year-old for Fulham in a League Cup defeat against Wigan Athletic on 4 December 2002. After playing in another League Cup defeat by Wigan on 23 September 2003, Leacock made his Premier League debut in a 2–0 win over Blackburn Rovers on 28 September 2003. He made four consecutive league appearances for Fulham before his run in the team was cut short when he tore knee ligaments in the pre-match warm up before Fulham's 3–1 over Manchester United on 25 October 2003. The injury ruled him out for the season. Despite the injury, Leacock signed a new deal with Fulham until 2006.

Leacock returned to fitness in time for the start of the 2004–05 season. On 10 September 2004, he joined Coventry City on a loan for a month, in a deal that was later extended to the end of the year. He made his debut for Coventry in a 3–0 defeat by Leeds United on 11 September 2004. He made 1 cup and 8 league appearances for Coventry before injury prompted an early return to Fulham. He returned to Coventry on loan in January 2005 and made a further 5 league and 2 cup appearances before his spell with the club was again cut short by injury. Leacock then made 5 league and 2 cup appearances for Fulham during the 2005–06 season, signing a new contract at the end of the season.

In July 2006, Leacock was poised to join League One side Swansea City in a £375,000 deal, but the deal collapsed at the last minute. However, on 10 August 2006, it was announced that he would join Derby County in a £375,000 transfer.

=== Derby County ===
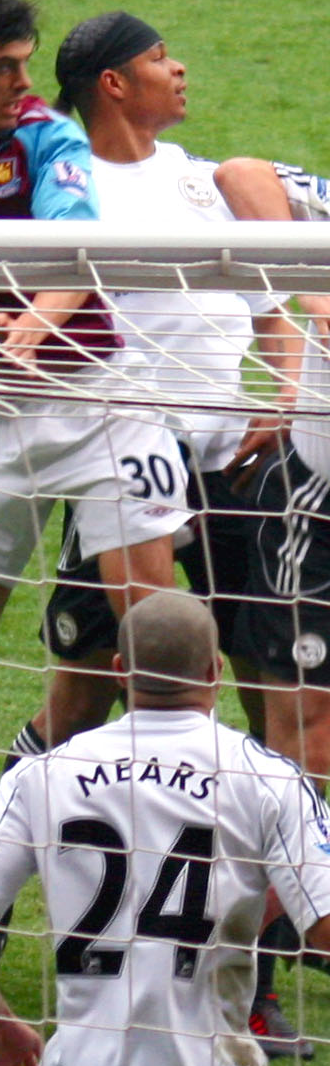
Leacock playing for Derby County in 2008

Leacock made his Derby debut in a 2–1 win over Hull City on 12 August 2006. He was a regular first team player in his first season at the East Midlands club, playing 38 league games and playing in all 3 games of the Championship playoffs as Derby were promoted to the Premiership as playoff winners.

Leacock played his first Premier League game for Derby on 18 August 2007, in a 4–0 defeat by Tottenham Hotspur. In what would be a disastrous season for Derby that would end in relegation, Leacock played 26 League games, captaining Derby for the first time in a 2–1 defeat by Liverpool on 26 December 2007 and scoring an own goal in a 2–2 draw against his former employers Fulham on 29 March 2008.

Leacock was out of the first team picture at the start of the 2008/09 season with manager Paul Jewell telling Leacock he would listen to any offers for him. However, following Derby's disappointing start to the season, and with the retirement of Derby captain Alan Stubbs, he found himself brought back into the first eleven, and taken off the transfer list. He made his first appearance of the season in a 1–0 defeat by Southampton on 23 August 2008. Leacock subsequently started seven of Derby's eight game unbeaten run that took them from the bottom of the table to within reach of the playoffs by the start of October, forming a good partnership with Martin Albrechtsen. On 18 October 2008 he was rewarded with a new contract to keep him at the club until 2012. After suffering a hamstring injury in Derby's 4–1 League Cup win over Brighton on 4 November 2008, Leacock went on to miss the rest of the season, and was ultimately out for eight months through hamstring and pelvis injuries that at times left him unable to walk.

Leacock made his first appearance of the 2009/10 season in a 1–0 defeat by Sheffield United on 12 September 2009. He went on to play 12 out of 17 league games, before bruising his kneecap in a 2–1 defeat against Doncaster Rovers on 12 December 2009. After sitting out three games as a precaution, Leacock was ruled out for four to six weeks. After undergoing knee surgery, his comeback was delayed until the end of February and he returned to full training and reserve team action at the start of March. Leacock returned to first team action on 16 March, coming on as a substitute in a 2–2 draw against Middlesbrough, making two more substitute appearances before starting his first game in over three months, in a 1–0 win over Leicester City on 27 March. In Derby's next game, against Coventry City a week later, Leacock was forced off at half time with knee ligament damage, and was ruled out for the rest of the season.

Leacock returned to full training in time for Derby's pre-season campaign and started the 2010/11 season as Derby's first choice centre back (alongside Shaun Barker) and played the full 90 minutes of each of the opening eight league and cup games of the campaign, even notching the first goal of his 9 1/2 year senior career, on 18 September 2010, against Barnsley at Oakwell in a 1–1 draw. He made his 100th career league appearance in a 5–0 win over Crystal Palace on 25 September 2010 but sustained a hamstring injury which ruled him out for several weeks. He returned to the first team ahead of schedule on 16 October 2010, reuniting with Barker at the heart of the Derby defence as they ran out 3–0 winners over Preston North End. Leacock held his place in the team over the next two months but came in for severe criticism from Derby manager Nigel Clough after his performance in a 5–2 defeat by local rivals Nottingham Forest. After this, Leacock made only three starts over the next 12 months before it was announced that had left the club by mutual consent and was set to sign for League One side Leyton Orient.

=== Leyton Orient ===
On 14 January 2012, Leacock joined League One side Leyton Orient on a contract until the end of the 2011–12 season.

=== Notts County ===
On 26 June 2012, Leacock joined League One side Notts County on a two-year contract. He made his first competitive appearance in a 2–1 win over Crewe Alexandra.

=== Crawley Town ===
Leacock joined Crawley Town on 17 July 2014, after the expiration of his contract with Notts County.

=== Whitehawk ===
Leacock joined Whitehawk on 2 October 2015, after Crawley failed to renew his initial one-year contract deal, making his debut in a 6–0 home win against St. Albans City the following day.

== Honours ==
Derby County

- Football League Championship play-offs: 2007
