= 2005–06 Derby County F.C. season =

Derby County
2005–06 season
- Manager: Phil Brown (until 30 January); Terry Westley (from 30 January)
- Stadium: Pride Park Stadium
- Championship: 20th
- FA Cup: Fourth round
- League Cup: First round
- Top goalscorer: Iñigo Idiakez (11)

During the 2005–06 English football season, Derby County competed in the Football League Championship.

== Season summary ==
Derby County had high hopes going into the season after finishing fourth the previous season, but manager George Burley, who had transformed Derby from relegation candidates into promotion hopefuls, quit in June following the sale of young midfielder Tom Huddlestone to Tottenham Hotspur, without Burley's knowledge nor consent. His replacement, Phil Brown (in his first full-time managerial position) was unable to build on Burley's good work and their poor form dragged them into the relegation mire instead. He was sacked in January after a 6–1 thrashing against Coventry City in the league and a 3–1 defeat against League One side Colchester United in the FA Cup, with Derby languishing in 19th. Former coach Terry Westley stepped up as caretaker manager; despite no wins in his first five games, he was named as caretaker manager for the remainder of the season - Westley promptly won his first game two days later, 1–0 at home to Plymouth. Westley marginally improved Derby's form and they managed to confirm their Championship survival with a few games of the season to spare. Westley, however, was not offered the role of permanent manager; that went to former Preston North End boss Billy Davies.

Derby's form was especially poor away from home, with only 2 away wins all season, a complete contrast from the previous season from which they won 12 away games including six in a row.

== Kit ==
Derby changed both their kit manufacturer and sponsor this season, with Spanish company Joma producing the kits and the Derbyshire Building Society sponsoring the kits.

== Final league table ==
Pos	Team	Pld	W	D	L	GF	GA	GD	Pts	Promotion, qualification or relegation
18	Hull City	46	12	16	18	49	55	−6	52	
19	Sheffield Wednesday	46	13	13	20	39	52	−13	52	
20	Derby County	46	10	20	16	53	67	−14	50	
21	Queens Park Rangers	46	12	14	20	50	65	−15	50	
22	Crewe Alexandra (R)	46	9	15	22	57	86	−29	42	Relegation to Football League One

Updated to match(es) played on 2 December 2011. Source: RSSSF
Rules for classification: 1) points; 2) goal difference; 3) number of goals scored.
(R) Relegated

== Players ==
=== First-team squad ===
Squad at end of season

Note: Flags indicate national team as defined under FIFA eligibility rules; some limited exceptions apply. Players may hold more than one non-FIFA nationality.

No.	Pos.	Nation	Player
1	GK	(England) ENG	Lee Camp (Note: Camp was born in Derby, England, and represented them at U-21 level, but also qualifies to represent Northern Ireland internationally and would make his full international debut for Northern Ireland in March 2011.)
3	DF	(Poland) POL	Tomasz Hajto
4	DF	(England) ENG	Alan Wright (on loan from Sheffield United)
5	DF	(Republic of Ireland) IRL	Jeff Kenna
6	DF	(Jamaica) JAM	Michael Johnson (Note: Johnson was born in Nottingham, England, but also qualified to represent Jamaica internationally and made his international debut for Jamaica in 1999.) (captain)
7	FW	(England) ENG	Tommy Smith
8	MF	(Denmark) DEN	Morten Bisgaard
9	FW	(Morocco) MAR	Mounir El Hamdaoui (Note: El Hamdaoui was born in Rotterdam, the Netherlands, and represented them at U-21 level, but also qualifies to represent Morocco internationally and represented them at B level before making his full international debut for Morocco in February 2009.) (on loan from Tottenham Hotspur)
10	DF	(England) ENG	Pablo Mills
11	FW	(Canada) CAN	Paul Peschisolido
12	MF	(England) ENG	Paul Thirlwell
13	GK	(England) ENG	Lee Grant
14	DF	(England) ENG	Richard Jackson
15	MF	(England) ENG	Adam Bolder

No.	Pos.	Nation	Player
16	DF	(England) ENG	Marc Edworthy
17	DF	(England) ENG	Paul Boertien
18	MF	(England) ENG	Seth Johnson
19	MF	(England) ENG	Nathan Doyle
20	FW	(England) ENG	Lee Holmes
21	MF	(Scotland) SCO	Michael McIndoe (on loan from Doncaster Rovers)
23	DF	(Jamaica) JAM	Darren Moore (Note: Moore was born in Birmingham, England, but also qualified to represent Jamaica internationally through his parents and made his international debut for Jamaica in 1999.)
24	GK	(England) ENG	Kevin Poole
25	DF	(England) ENG	Mitchell Hanson
27	MF	(Spain) ESP	Iñigo Idiakez
28	FW	(England) ENG	Giles Barnes (Note: Barnes was born in Barking and Dagenham, England, and represented them at U-19 level, but also qualifies to represent Jamaica internationally through his paternal grandparents and would make his international debut for Jamaica in May 2015.)
29	FW	(England) ENG	Lionel Ainsworth
30	DF	(Wales) WAL	Lewin Nyatanga (Note: Nyatanga was born in Burton upon Trent, England, but also qualifies to represent Wales internationally through his mother and Zimbabwe through his father, and represented Wales at U-17 and U-21 level before making his international debut for Wales in March 2006.)
32	DF	(England) ENG	Miles Addison

=== Left club during season ===
Note: Flags indicate national team as defined under FIFA eligibility rules; some limited exceptions apply. Players may hold more than one non-FIFA nationality.

No.	Pos.	Nation	Player
3	DF	(England) ENG	Jamie Vincent (to Millwall)
3	MF	(England) ENG	Peter Whittingham (on loan from Aston Villa)
4	DF	(England) ENG	Andrew Davies (on loan from Middlesbrough)
5	DF	(Bosnia and Herzegovina) BIH	Muhamed Konjić (retired)
9	FW	(Poland) POL	Grzegorz Rasiak (to Tottenham Hotspur)
9	FW	(Trinidad and Tobago) TRI	Stern John (on loan from Coventry City)
21	DF	(Northern Ireland) NIR	Chris Turner (to Sligo Rovers)
22	FW	(England) ENG	Dean Holdsworth (to Weymouth)

No.	Pos.	Nation	Player
22	FW	(Jamaica) JAM	Kevin Lisbie (Note: Lisbie was born in Hackney, England, but also qualifies to represent Jamaica internationally and made his international debut for Jamaica in 2002.) (on loan from Charlton Athletic)
23	FW	(England) ENG	Marcus Tudgay (to Sheffield Wednesday)
25	MF	(Senegal) SEN	Khalilou Fadiga (on loan from Bolton Wanderers)
25	FW	(Brazil) BRA	Elpídio Silva (to Corinthians Alagoano)
31	MF	(England) ENG	Johnnie Jackson (on loan from Tottenham Hotspur)
32	FW	(England) ENG	Dexter Blackstock (Note: Blackstock was born in Oxford, England, and represented them at U-18, U-19, and U-21 level, but also qualifies to represent Antigua and Barbuda internationally and made his international debut for Antigua and Barbuda in February 2012.) (on loan from Southampton)
33	DF	(Brazil) BRA	Emerson Thome (on loan from Wigan Athletic)
34	FW	(England) ENG	Danny Graham (on loan from Middlesbrough)

=== Reserve squad ===
Note: Flags indicate national team as defined under FIFA eligibility rules; some limited exceptions apply. Players may hold more than one non-FIFA nationality.

No. / Pos. / Nation / Player; 25 / DF / (England) ENG / Mitchell Hanson	No. / Pos. / Nation / Player; 31 / DF / (England) ENG / Karl Ashton
