= Mitchell Hanson =

English footballer (born 1988)

Personal information
- Full name: Mitchell Gene Ben Hanson
- Date of birth: 2 September 1988 (age 38)
- Place of birth: Derby, England
- Height: 6 ft 1 in (1.85 m)
- Position: Defender

Youth career
- Derby County

Senior career*
Years	Team	Apps	(Gls)
2006–2011	Derby County	0	(0)
2008	→ Port Vale (loan)	0	(0)
2008	→ Notts County (loan)	5	(0)
2011	Oxford United	2	(0)
2011–2013	Eastwood Town	55	(1)
2013–2015	Gresley	52	(11)
Total		114	(12)

Managerial career
- 2012–2013: Eastwood Town (caretaker)
- * Club domestic league appearances and goals

Mitchell Gene Ben Hanson (born 2 September 1988) is an English former professional footballer who played as a defender. He spent 2006 to 2011 at Derby County, playing on loan at Port Vale and Notts County, before signing with Eastwood Town via Oxford United in 2011, where he became joint-caretaker manager in October 2012. He moved to Gresley in the summer of 2013.

== Club career ==
Born in Derby, Derbyshire, Hanson had extensive reserve team experience and made his debut for the reserve team whilst a schoolboy. Hanson's first taste of the first-team at Derby was appearing as an unused substitute in the 5–0 defeat away to Reading in April 2006. Hanson, who graduated through the academy, signed his first professional contract with Derby in June 2007. After struggling to break into Paul Jewell's first-team, Hanson joined League One strugglers Port Vale on a season-long loan, despite struggling with a calf injury. He returned to Derby in April 2008, without making a first-team appearance for the "Valiants".

He made his first-team debut for Derby as an 89th-minute substitute in a 4–1 victory over Brighton & Hove Albion on 4 November 2008. and joined Notts County on a months loan in November 2008. He returned to Derby County on New Years Day 2009, after having appeared in five league games for the "Magpies" He signed a new two-year deal with the "Rams" in January 2009.

Early in the 2009–10 season, Hanson sustained a dislocated kneecap which ruled him out of contention for a year, eventually resuming full training in late September 2010. He returned to action with a 60-minute appearance in the reserves 3–1 defeat at Rotherham United the following month. After failing to break into the first-team picture, Hanson's Derby contract was cancelled by mutual consent five months early in January 2011. He played for Oxford United reserves on trial in February 2011. Two months later he signed a contract until the end of the season; he made two substitute appearances for the club and was not offered a new contract in the summer.

In September 2011, he signed for Conference North club Eastwood Town. The "Badgers" suffered relegation in last place in 2011–12, winning just four games all season. He was appointed caretaker manager, alongside Paul Riley, following the departure of former manager John Ramshaw in October 2012.

He signed with Gresley of Northern Premier League Division One South in September 2013. He helped the "Moatmen" to a ninth-place finish in 2013–14. He became Gresley's first choice penalty taker in the 2014–15 season and successfully converted the first five penalties of the season. Gresley reached the play-off semi-finals in 2015, losing to Leek Town. He retired in September 2015 due to injury.

== International career ==
Hanson has played for England at under-18 level, showing his versatility by adapting to a holding midfielder role rather than his preferred position in defence.

== Career statistics ==
Appearances and goals by club, season and competition
Club	Season	League			FA Cup		League Cup		Other		Total	
Club	Season	Division	Apps	Goals	Apps	Goals	Apps	Goals	Apps	Goals	Apps	Goals
Derby County	2005–06	Championship	0	0	0	0	0	0	—		0	0
Derby County	2006–07	Championship	0	0	0	0	0	0	0	0	0	0
Derby County	2007–08	Premier League	0	0	0	0	0	0	—		0	0
Derby County	2008–09	Championship	0	0	0	0	1	0	—		1	0
Derby County	2009–10	Championship	0	0	0	0	0	0	—		0	0
Derby County	2010–11	Championship	0	0	0	0	0	0	—		0	0
Derby County	Total		0	0	0	0	1	0	0	0	1	0
Port Vale (loan)	2007–08	League One	0	0	—		—		—		0	0
Notts County (loan)	2008–09	League Two	5	0	0	0	—		—		5	0
Oxford United	2010–11	League Two	2	0	—		—		—		2	0
Gresley	2013–14	Northern Premier League; Division One South	24	2	2	0	—		7	1	33	3
Gresley	2014–15	Northern Premier League; Division One South	28	9	1	0	—		5	1	34	10
Gresley	Total		52	11	3	0	0	0	12	2	67	13
Career total (Note: Statistics for Eastwood Town not recorded)			59	11	3	0	1	0	12	2	75	13
