= Mark O'Brien (footballer, born 1992) =

Irish Footballer born 1992

Personal information
- Full name: Mark Leo O'Brien
- Date of birth: 20 November 1992 (age 33)
- Place of birth: Ballyfermot, Dublin, Ireland
- Height: 1.85 m (6 ft 1 in)
- Position: Defender

Youth career
- 2000–2008: Cherry Orchard
- 2008–2010: Derby County

Senior career*
Years	Team	Apps	(Gls)
2009–2015	Derby County	32	(0)
2014–2015	→ Motherwell (loan)	19	(0)
2015–2017	Luton Town	6	(0)
2016	→ Southport (loan)	7	(1)
2016	→ Southport (loan)	5	(0)
2017–2020	Newport County	103	(4)
Total		172	(5)

International career
- Republic of Ireland U17
2010–2011	Republic of Ireland U19	2	(0)
- * Club domestic league appearances and goals

Mark Leo O'Brien (born 20 November 1992) is an Irish former professional footballer who played as a defender. He played in the English Football League for Derby County, Luton Town and Newport County and in the Scottish Premiership for Motherwell.

== Club career ==
=== Derby County ===
O'Brien started his career at Cherry Orchard, before he was spotted by Derby County scouts in the Dublin & District Schoolboy League.

After signing for Derby, O'Brien became a regular in the club's under-18 team in 2008–09, before making his professional debut as a 64th-minute substitute for Lewin Nyatanga in a 3–1 defeat away to Watford on 3 May 2009. He was earlier named Derby County Academy Player of the Year at a club awards ceremony. He also won the 2009 Republic of Ireland Under-16 Player of the Year award.

In November 2009, it was announced by Derby County that O'Brien had successfully undergone heart surgery to correct a valve problem, and that he would be able to resume his career following a three to four-month recovery period. The problem had been discovered during a routine medical scan for academy players. The operation was carried out at Leicester's Glenfield Hospital. Following a successful recovery, he was an unused substitute in Derby's final first-team game of 2009–10 as they ran out 2–0 winners against Cardiff City at Pride Park.

In 2010–11, O'Brien returned to being a regular in the club's under-18 team and reserve team, and was also part of The Central League Central Division title winning team. O'Brien appeared twice for the first-team, both as late substitutes in league games against Barnsley and Ipswich Town in October and November 2010 respectively.

On 6 August 2011, O'Brien made an appearance in the first game of 2011–12 season in a 2–1 win at home to Birmingham City, replacing the injured Russell Anderson in the 35th minute. O'Brien continued to start in subsequent league games against Watford, Blackpool and Doncaster Rovers, as Derby won their opening four league games for the first time since 1905. However, this run was ended against Burnley, as an O'Brien defensive error contributed to a 2–1 defeat. On 13 September, O'Brien signed a new four-year contract, extending his stay at Pride Park until the summer of 2015. He made 21 appearances for the club until he was ruled out for the season in December, after damaging his cruciate ligaments in training. O'Brien won the Contribution to the Community Award at Derby County's 2012 awards night.

On 3 July 2012, O'Brien visited a specialist to see if he would be given the all clear to take part in Derby County's 2012–13 pre-season training. O'Brien was given clearance to take part in pre-season training by the specialist and after the sale of Jason Shackell, Derby manager Nigel Clough stated his faith in O'Brien's ability at Championship level. He returned to full training after Derby arrived back from their summer break at Moor Farm on 12 July. O'Brien made his return in a 1–0 pre-season victory over Burton Albion at the Pirelli Stadium, replacing captain Richard Keogh in the 77th minute. Despite playing in several pre-season friendlies including a start at Northampton Town; O'Brien was unable to feature at the start of season due to swelling on his knee. Nigel Clough said he would be cautious over O'Brien's return to action, initially with the new under-21 team. O'Brien made his return on 1 October, playing 60 minutes for the under-21s against Crewe Alexandra. He made his return to first-team action 10 months after his last appearance on 27 October as a 72nd-minute substitute in a 3–0 defeat away to Peterborough United. O'Brien made his return to the starting lineup for the first time in 13 months in Derby's 2–0 win over Bristol City on 15 December. His "unbelievable character" during the match was praised by manager Nigel Clough as he played 87 minutes in the game and was a key factor in Derby's first clean sheet in seven games. Clough said that "He was tremendous. He was struggling at half-time, so we said 'just get back out for 10 or 15 minutes.' He was then struggling at the 70-minute mark but we told him 'you're going to have to stay on.' He then succumbed to cramp in the end but he showed unbelievable character to play for so long because 13 months since a start is a long, long time at this level." O'Brien kept his place in the team until he picked up an injury in the warm-up in Derby's game at Sheffield Wednesday on 9 February 2013. O'Brien was removed from the starting lineup and was later ruled out for a month due to knee joint injury. In late March, O'Brien was ruled out for a further six months after undergoing knee surgery. O'Brien, as expected, missed the 2013–14 pre-season training due to his injury, but was on course to return in the autumn.

On 15 August 2014, O'Brien signed for Scottish Premiership club Motherwell on loan until January 2015. He made his debut on 30 August in Motherwell's 1–0 defeat to St Johnstone. On 5 January 2015, O'Brien's loan was extended until the end of the season. He played a total of 21 games for Motherwell over the course of 2014–15.

In May 2015, Derby announced that O'Brien's contract would not be renewed.

=== Luton Town ===
O'Brien signed for League Two club Luton Town on 9 July 2015 on a two-year contract. He made his debut for the club in a 3–1 win at home to newly promoted Championship club Bristol City in the League Cup first round on 11 August. O'Brien made eight further appearances for Luton, before joining Southport of the National League on 4 March 2016 on a one-month loan. He made his debut the following day in a 1–0 home defeat to FC Halifax Town. O'Brien scored his first goal for Southport a week later, scoring their third goal in a 3–3 home draw with Welling United. He made the last appearance of his loan spell on 2 April in a 2–2 draw at home to Woking. The following day, O'Brien returned to Luton after his loan expired. He was transfer-listed by Luton at the end of the season. O'Brien returned to Southport on 9 September 2016 on a three-month loan. He made his second debut for the club a day later in a 1–1 away draw with Eastleigh. However, his loan spell was cut short due to a knee injury and he returned to Luton for treatment.

=== Newport County ===
On 6 January 2017, O'Brien signed for League Two club Newport County on a contract until the end of the 2016–17 season, after his Luton contract was terminated by mutual consent earlier that day. He was named in the starting lineup a day later away to Stevenage, making his debut in a 3–1 defeat. His first goal was an 89th-minute winner in a 2–1 victory at home to Notts County, which ensured Newport's survival in League Two on the final day of the season. O'Brien finished the season with 20 appearances for Newport, and signed a new two-year contract with the club in May 2017. He started in the 2019 League Two play-off final at Wembley Stadium on 25 May 2019, being sent off on 89 minutes, as Newport lost 1–0 to Tranmere Rovers. O'Brien signed a further two-year contract extension with Newport five days later.

O'Brien retired from playing on 15 June 2020, due to requiring further heart valve surgery, stating "It's just got to the stage where I have pushed this valve as far as it can go".

== International career ==
O'Brien has been capped at youth level for his native Ireland, at under-19 level. O'Brien was called up as standby at under-21 level for a game against Liechtenstein in November 2011. In January 2013, he was called up to the under-21 squad for the first time for a friendly game against the Netherlands on 6 February.

== Career statistics ==
Appearances and goals by club, season and competition
Club	Season	League			National Cup		League Cup		Other		Total	
Club	Season	Division	Apps	Goals	Apps	Goals	Apps	Goals	Apps	Goals	Apps	Goals
Derby County	2008–09	Championship	1	0	0	0	0	0	—		1	0
Derby County	2009–10	Championship	0	0	0	0	0	0	—		0	0
Derby County	2010–11	Championship	2	0	0	0	0	0	—		2	0
Derby County	2011–12	Championship	20	0	0	0	1	0	—		21	0
Derby County	2012–13	Championship	9	0	2	0	0	0	—		11	0
Derby County	2013–14	Championship	0	0	0	0	0	0	0	0	0	0
Derby County	2014–15	Championship	0	0	—		0	0	—		0	0
Derby County	Total		32	0	2	0	1	0	0	0	35	0
Motherwell (loan)	2014–15	Scottish Premiership	19	0	1	0	1	0	—		21	0
Luton Town	2015–16	League Two	6	0	0	0	2	0	1 (Note: Appearance in Football League Trophy)	0	9	0
Luton Town	2016–17	League Two	0	0	—		0	0	0	0	0	0
Luton Town	Total		6	0	0	0	2	0	1	0	9	0
Southport (loan)	2015–16	National League	7	1	—		—		—		7	1
Southport (loan)	2016–17	National League	5	0	0	0	—		0	0	5	0
Southport (loan)	Total		12	1	0	0	—		0	0	12	1
Newport County	2016–17	League Two	20	1	—		—		—		20	1
Newport County	2017–18	League Two	28	0	4	0	1	0	0	0	33	0
Newport County	2018–19	League Two	34	2	6	0	0	0	6 (Note: Three appearances in EFL Trophy, three in League Two play-offs)	0	46	2
Newport County	2019–20	League Two	21	1	4	0	2	0	1 (Note: Appearance in EFL Trophy)	0	28	1
Newport County	Total		103	4	14	0	3	0	7	0	127	4
Career total			172	5	17	0	7	0	8	0	204	5

== Honours ==
Derby County

- The Central League Central Division: 2010–11

Individual

- Derby County Academy Player of the Year: 2008–09
- Republic of Ireland Under-16 Player of the Year: 2008–09
- Derby County Community to the Club Award: 2011–12
