= James Severn =

English footballer

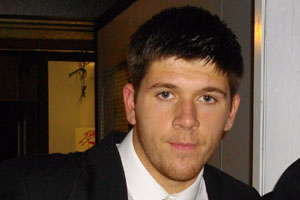
- Severn in 2010

Personal information
- Full name: James Alexander Robert McEwen Severn
- Date of birth: 10 October 1991 (age 35)
- Place of birth: Nottingham, England
- Position: Goalkeeper

Youth career
- ?–2010: Derby County

Senior career*
Years	Team	Apps	(Gls)
2010–2012	Derby County	1	(0)
2010	→ Tamworth (loan)	3	(0)
2011	→ Eastwood Town (loan)	22	(0)
2012–2015	Scunthorpe United	3	(0)
2012	→ Tamworth (loan)	3	(0)
2014	→ Alfreton Town (loan)	0	(0)
2015	Worcester City	1	(0)
2015–2016	Ross County	0	(0)
Total		33	(0)

International career
2008	England U17	2	(0)
2009	England U19	2	(0)
2011	England U20	1	(0)
- * Club domestic league appearances and goals

James Alexander Robert McEwen Severn (born 10 October 1991) is an English former footballer who played as a goalkeeper.

== Football career ==
=== Derby County ===
Born in Nottingham, Severn began his football career at his childhood team Derby County. He signed a professional contract at Derby in 2010.

In October 2010, Severn was loaned out to Tamworth after Ross Atkins was recalled by Derby. He made his first appearance against Rushden & Diamonds on 16 October in the Conference National. He was recalled by Derby in November.

On 22 February 2011, Severn made his Derby debut as a substitute in the 47th minute, replacing the injured Stephen Bywater in the 1–0 home defeat to Hull City in the Championship. At the end of the 2010–11 season Derby confirmed they had taken up the option of an extra year on Severn's contract.

On 12 August 2011, Derby confirmed that Severn would be loaned to Eastwood Town until 31 December. He appeared 22 times for The Badgers of the Conference North, keeping only one clean sheet. Severn was given Derby's number 33 and became substitute goalkeeper when Adam Legzdins was loaned out to Burton Albion on 20 March 2012. At the end of the 2011–12 season, he was released by the club.

=== Scunthorpe United ===
After a successful trial, Severn joined League One side Scunthorpe United on a one-year contract on 17 May 2012. He was second choice to Sam Slocombe, and made his debut on 29 September in a 2–1 loss at Portsmouth when Slocombe was injured in the 23rd minute; he saved a penalty from Brian Howard. On 21 November, he re-joined Football Conference side Tamworth on loan for a month.

On 24 October 2014, Severn joined Alfreton Town on loan for a month. He injured his thigh in an FA Cup fourth qualifying match against Lincoln City, putting him on the sidelines for two months and leaving the Conference club with no goalkeeper for the replay. On his return on 17 January 2015, he was the substitute after Slocombe broke his arm ten minutes into a 2–0 home loss to Bristol City, and suffered the same injury 32 minutes later.

=== Later career ===
After a short stint with Worcester City, Severn signed for Scottish Premiership club Ross County in October 2015. He and Gary Woods were brought in as cover for the injured Scott Fox, with Woods first choice and Severn unused until his release in January 2016.
