= Saul Deeney =

Irish footballer (born 1983)

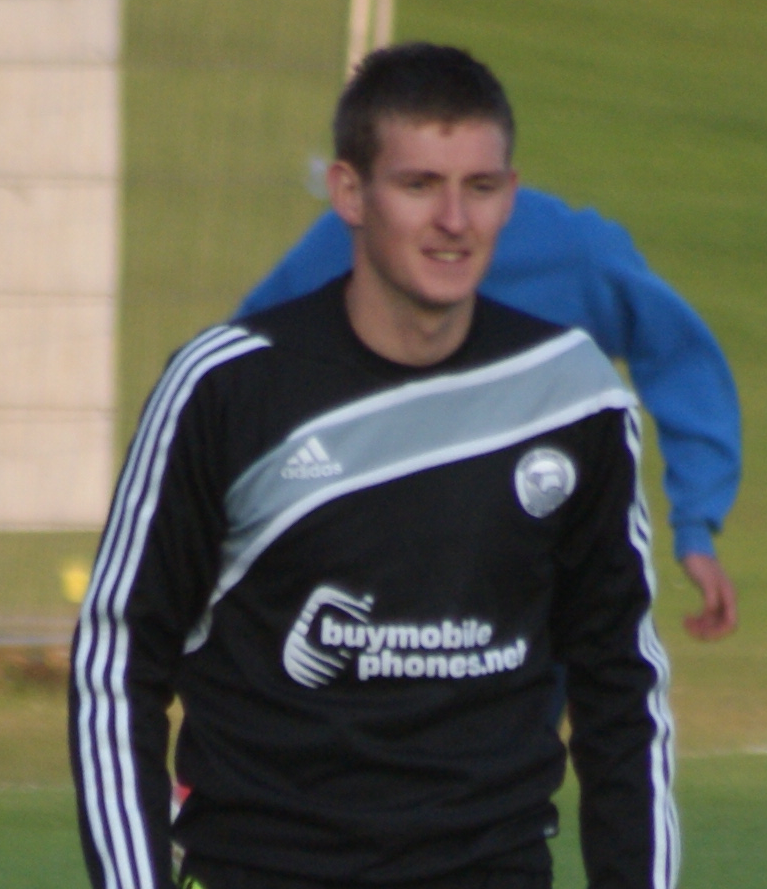
- Deeney training with Derby County in 2009

Personal information
- Full name: Saul Deeney
- Date of birth: 23 March 1983 (age 43)
- Place of birth: Derry, Northern Ireland
- Height: 6 ft 1 in (1.85 m)
- Position: Goalkeeper

Team information
- Current team: Basford United

Senior career*
Years	Team	Apps	(Gls)
2000–2005	Notts County	42	(0)
2001–2002	→ Ilkeston Town (loan)	4	(0)
2002	→ Gresley Rovers (loan)	6	(0)
2002–2003	→ Hull City (loan)	0	(0)
2005–2006	Burton Albion	30	(0)
2006–2007	Notts County	7	(0)
2007	Hucknall Town	9	(0)
2007–2009	Burton Albion	22	(0)
2009–2014	Derby County	3	(0)
2014–2015	Basford United		
2015	Institute	3	(0)
2015–2019	Basford United		
2019–2022	Coalville Town	43	(0)
2022	→ Ilkeston Town (loan)	7	(0)
2022–2023	Ilkeston Town	1	(0)
2023–2024	Matlock Town	55	(0)
2024–	Basford United	38	(0)

International career
2005	Republic of Ireland U21	2	(0)
- * Club domestic league appearances and goals as of 16:36, 5 October 2025 (UTC)

Saul Deeney (born 23 March 1983) is an Irish footballer who plays as a goalkeeper for Basford United, where he is also assistant manager. He represented the Republic of Ireland at Youth and under-21 level.

== Club career ==
=== Notts County ===
Born in Derry, Northern Ireland, Deeney signed for Notts County on a four-year contract in August 2000. He had loan periods with Ilkeston Town, Gresley Rovers and Hull City. He established himself as first-choice goalkeeper at Notts County when Ian Richardson became player-manager at the club. Deeney turned down a new contract at the end of the 2004–05 season, although he returned to the club for pre-season training. After falling down the order at County, Deeney had a trial with Sheffield United in September 2005.

=== Burton Albion ===
Deeney left Notts County in October after not being offered a new contract and joined Burton Albion of the Conference National in November and played 30 league games. Deeney had one of the highlights of his career on 8 January 2006 during the FA Cup match between Burton Albion and Manchester United, keeping out two shots from Wayne Rooney as well as saving a Ritchie Jones shot in injury time. He signed a new contract that would expire at the end of the 2005–06 season in January.

=== Return to Notts County ===
After leaving Burton in the summer of 2006, Deeney re-signed for Notts County, where he remained for a year.

=== Hucknall Town and return to Burton Albion ===
After a short spell at Hucknall Town, he rejoined former club Burton Albion in October 2007 on non-contract terms as back-up to first choice Kevin Poole, before signing a new contract in December that would expire at the end of the 2007–08 season. Deeney was retained for by the club the 2008–09 season where he remained second choice to Poole, playing 8 times in the season for The Brewers including the final four games which ensured Burton were promoted to the Football League for the first time in the club's history.

=== Derby County ===
He left the club in June 2009 and after having a successful trial with Derby County he signed for the club on a one-year contract on 31 July 2009. Deeney spent much of the season as number two behind Stephen Bywater before making his debut as a 13th-minute substitute in a match against Reading on 10 March 2010. He was sent off 27 minutes later after a professional foul on Jay Tabb and replaced in goal by midfielder Robbie Savage. At the end of the 2009–10 season, an optional 12 months clause in his contract was activated, keeping Deeney at Pride Park until the end of the 2010–11 season. Deeney's full debut came in a 2–1 defeat to Bristol City and he kept his first clean sheet for the club in his debut appearance at Pride Park in the final game of the 2009–10 season, when Derby ran out 2–0 winners against Cardiff City.

With Stephen Bywater's return to the first team line up for the 2010–11 season, Deeney returned to the Derby bench. When Bywater injured his wrist in training in October 2010, Deeney was unable to take advantage and make a claim for a first team spot as he was granted compassionate leave the day before Derby's next game, against Preston North End, to visit his father in Northern Ireland, who had become seriously ill and later died. Upon his return to availability, Deeney found himself kept out of the first team by loanee Frank Fielding and later the returning Stephen Bywater. In February 2011, Deeney ruptured a tendon in his shoulder ruling him out for five months and meaning he would complete the 2010–11 campaign without a single first team appearance. Despite this, Derby confirmed their intention to offer Deeney a new contract at the club at the end of the 2010–11 season.

Deeney missed the majority of the 2011–12 season with a shoulder injury, but the club activated a contract clause which extended Deeney's stay at the club for a further year. He made his return to first team action in over two years in a pre-season friendly against Mansfield Town on 25 July 2012. Deeney spent the season as third choice goalkeeper, featuring as an un-used substitute when Frank Fielding was suspended or injured, he also played several times as an overage player for the club's under-21 side.

At the end of the season, Nigel Clough had an overhaul of the goalkeeping department at the club with Derby signing Burnley goalkeeper Lee Grant and Adam Legzdins and Frank Fielding were free to move, Clough expected Deeney to be second choice to Grant in 2013–14, whilst being told by Clough that Derby would sign a loan keeper if Grant picked up an injury. As a result, Deeney contract was extended by a year to the summer of 2014. However, Legzdins remained at the club and Deeney's contract was terminated on 30 January 2014, after falling further down the pecking order under Steve McClaren.

=== Institute ===
Saul Deeney joined Institute of the NIFL Premiership on 13 January 2015. He made his debut for the club 10 days later, on 23 January, in a 2-1 league defeat away to Glenavon. He left the club after appearing in only three league games, and retired as a player, returning to Notts County to become a coach.

=== Northern Premier League ===
In 2015, Deeney came out of retirement to play for Basford United; he was the club's first-choice goalkeeper during the 2015/2016 season, making 36 league appearances.

On 1 June 2019, Deeney signed for Southern League Premier Division Central side Coalville Town.

Deeney extended his stay with Coalville Town on 22 December 2019, when he signed a contract until the end of the 2020–21 season.

On 9 March 2022, Deeney joined Northern Premier League Division One Midlands side Ilkeston Town on loan for the remainder of the 2021–22 season. Having joined the club on a permanent basis in the summer, he joined Matlock Town in January 2023.

== Coaching career ==
In May 2024, Deeney returned to Basford United in the role of assistant manager, also registered as a back-up goalkeeper; he became the club's first-choice goalkeeper during the 2024–25 season.

== International career ==
Deeney has previously represented the Republic of Ireland at Youth and under-21 level.
