= 2009–10 Derby County F.C. season =

Derby County F.C.
2009–10 season
- Chairman: Andrew Appleby
- Manager: Nigel Clough
- Championship: 14th
- FA Cup: 5th round
- League Cup: 1st round
- Jack Stamps Trophy: Shaun Barker
- Top goalscorer: League: Rob Hulse (12); All: Rob Hulse (12)
- Highest home attendance: 33,010 v Peterborough United, Championship (8 August 2009)
- Lowest home attendance: 7,183 v Millwall, FA Cup (12 February 2010)
- Average home league attendance: 29,207
Home colours	Away colours	Third colours

The 2009–10 season was Derby County's 111th season in the Football League. It is their 42nd season in the second division of English football and their second consecutive season in the second tier following an 18th-placed finish in the previous campaign. Derby struggled against relegation for much of the season, but a run of just two defeats in the final 10 fixtures saw the club finish in 14th, their third highest finish in their respective division in the previous ten years. The Derby Evening Telegraph described the campaign as "Good in patches, poor in others, and ultimately frustrating."

The season was Nigel Clough's first full season in the job following his appointment in January 2009. The club started the season with odds of 21/1 for the title, though the media prediction was that they would improve greatly on the previous campaign's struggles and push for a playoff place. This proved overly optimistic, however, as the club battled relegation from the Championship for the fifth time in eight seasons. Although the club never fell into the bottom three during the campaign (the lowest position was 20th) it spent just six fixtures in the top half of the table, only one of which was achieved after August. A lack of consistency was one reason; not only in results (the club never recording more than two consecutive victories) but also in the club's inability to field a consistent team selection. A club record 40 players represented the club, with only 6 players making 30 or more league starts, and an over-reliance on loanees (14 players signing temporary deals over the season) also played a part, as did injuries; one match, away to Ipswich Town in October, came at the height of the club's injury problems and saw them unable to even name a full complement of substitutes such was the lack of players available. A purple patch of form in February saw the club end local rivals Nottingham Forest's 19 match unbeaten run, inflict eventual-Champions Newcastle United's biggest defeat of the season (3–0) and hit five in a match for the first time in three years when they edged out Preston North End 5–3 at Pride Park, but a run of just three wins in twelve through the end of February until the end of April, ensured that safety was not achieved until the 44th fixture of the season after a 1–1 draw at home to relegation rivals Crystal Palace. One bright point to the campaign came with the reserves successful The Central League Division One Central Section campaign, which saw them finish top and become the first Derby reserves team to win the title since Arthur Cox's reserves claimed it in the 1985–86 season. It was also the first time a Derby County reserves side had won its respective division since the club successfully captured the Premier Reserve League in 2000–01.

The club sold 21,406 season tickets for the 2009–10 season and had an average home attendance of 29,207 (down from 29,440 the previous season), second only to Champions Newcastle United's 43,388 and over 4,000 ahead of third placed Sheffield United. The ground operated at 86.9% capacity, putting it third behind Cardiff City and Blackpool. These averages made Derby the 12th best supported club in the country for the third consecutive season.

== Team kit ==
The team kit for the 2009–10 season is produced by Adidas and sponsored by Bombardier. The new home kit, the fifth in as many years, was officially unveiled at a special event on Derby market place on 3 July 2009 and the away kit was launched in a special exhibition at the Westfield Centre on 4 August 2009. The club retained the Argentina inspired third kit from the 2008–09 season.

Home colours	Away colours	Third colours

== Review ==
=== Preseason ===
The day after the final game of the 2008–09 season, a 3–1 defeat by Watford, Clough announced his intention to cut the playing staff by up to 17 players (including loanees), with the first casualties being Andy Todd and Paris Simmons, whose contracts were not renewed, and the loanees Nathan Ellington, Barry Bannan, John Eustace, Przemysław Kaźmierczak and Nacer Barazite returning to their parent clubs. Todd signed for Perth Glory and was later joined there by Mile Sterjovski, who left the club on a free transfer.

Others leaving the club were Tyrone Mears, who signed for Premier League club Burnley for a fee of £500k, rising to £600k with add-ons, Emanuel Villa, who moved to Mexican club Cruz Azul for an undisclosed fee, thought to be around £1.7m, and Lewis Price joined Football League One Brentford on a season-long loan. Liam Dickinson was the subject of two 'small' bids from Norwich City, both of which were rejected, leaving Dickinson to criticise the club for placing an 'unrealistic' valuation on him, before moving to Brighton & Hove Albion for £300,000. Lewin Nyatanga joined Bristol City for an undisclosed fee, thought to be around £500,000. Additionally, Martin Albrechtsen was told he was free to find a new club, and Claude Davis entered into negotiations to cancel his contract two years early.

Rumours consistently surfaced regarding Player of the Year Rob Hulse and Kris Commons being sold, with Clough stating he was 'unsurprised' by speculation linking Hulse with a £3m move to Middlesbrough, and Kris Commons with £3m and £4m moves to Celtic and Everton respectively.

Clough's first signings were non-League pair Jake Buxton from Burton Albion on an initial one-year deal and Ben Pringle from Ilkeston Town. They were joined by Exeter City's Dean Moxey, who signed for an initial £300,000 and former Norwich City winger Lee Croft and ex-Burton Albion goalkeeper Saul Deeney on free transfers. There was also a drawn out chase for Blackpool defender Shaun Barker, who also attracted interest from local rivals Nottingham Forest. An initial offer of £400,000, rising to £500,000 was rejected, with a rumoured £750,000 plus add-ons later offered. Other sources suggested that both Derby and Forest has made offers of £700,000 plus an unnamed player (rumoured to be Liam Dickinson, who had had a loan spell at Blackpool the previous campaign). He eventually signed on 15 July 2009 for a fee of £900,000.

On top of these signings, several trialists were taken. Of those trialled, the club declined to sign former Norwich City captain Mark Fotheringham and Cambridge City's Scott Neilson. A loan was agreed, in principle, for Arsenal's Mark Randall, though the club declined to sign the player after he failed to impress on trial, and initial contract talks were held with Patrick Kisnorbo, before he eventually joined Leeds United. There were also trials given to ex-Stoke City youngster Mark Grocott, Berwick Rangers forward Fraser McLaren and Juventus midfielder David Junior Toukam.

There were also links with Crewe Alexandra's John Brayford, Rangers midfielder Charlie Adam, Blackburn goalkeeper Frank Fielding and Charlton Athletic's Nicky Bailey.

=== August ===
Derby kicked off the 2009–10 season with a home match against newly promoted Peterborough United. Three players, Dean Moxey, Lee Croft and Jake Buxton, made their full debuts, with a fourth, Ben Pringle, coming on as a substitute. Gary Teale's 87th-minute goal sealed a 2–1 win and ensured that the club won its opening game of the season for the first time since 2002 and Robbie Savage's performance saw him named in the Championship Team of the week. The club's next three games were all away from home. A 2–1 defeat away to League Two side Rotherham United, which saw Derby exit the League Cup, a competition in which they reached the semi-finals the previous season, in the First round was followed by two league fixtures; a 3–2 defeat at Scunthorpe United, a match which saw Paul Green perform well enough to earn a pace in the Championship Team of the week, and a 0–0 draw away to Blackpool, which saw Stephen Bywater celebrate his 100th appearance for the club with his first clean sheet of the season and Robbie Savage replace Paul Connolly as team captain. The club's return to Pride Park saw them grab their second win of the season, coming from behind to beat Plymouth Argyle 2–1, Miles Addison scoring the winning goal and earning a place in the Championship team of the week. The first East Midlands derby at the season completed the opening month's fixtures, with Derby suffering their first defeat by Nottingham Forest in six years as they lost 3–2 at the City Ground. Following the match a scuffle broke out between the Derby and Forest players after Nathan Tyson celebrated in front of the Derby County support, an incident the FA said they would investigate with some "urgency", the end result of which saw both club's fined for failing to control their players and Tyson charged with improper conduct. Derby were fined £20,000, of which £10,000 was suspended, and ordered to pay £400 costs, Nottingham Forest were fined £25,000, of which £10,000 was suspended, and ordered to pay £1,200 costs and Tyson was fined £5,000 and given a two-match ban and ordered to pay £400 costs.

Away from the pitch, Clough continued to restructure the club's playing staff. Tottenham Hotspur midfielder Jake Livermore was brought in on an initial one-month loan, which was extended to the end of the year. He was joined by Leicester City's Paul Dickov, who also signed on loan until 1 January 2010. Southend United's young midfielder Medi Abalimba was signed for an undisclosed fee after a successful trial spell and former West Ham United goalkeeper Jimmy Walker was also taken on trial. These additions saw the contracts of Roy Carroll, Claude Davis and Martin Albrechtsen cancelled by mutual consent. Luke Varney was also sent out on loan to Sheffield Wednesday for a second time, this time for four months. A blow was dealt when Chris Porter was ruled out until Christmas after having surgery on his hip, though his strike partner Rob Hulse committed his future to the club in the face of speculation of an imminent £5m bid from Middlesbrough.

Financially, the club announced that it had cut £400,000 off of the amount paid to player's agents for the first six months of 2009 in comparison to the same period at the end of 2008 and had reduced its debt to just the £15m mortgage on Pride Park Stadium, down from a £31m debt 18 months previously.

=== September ===
The summer Transfer deadline day on 1 September saw Derby make just one move in the market, as Jordan Stewart moved to Sheffield United in part exchange for Lee Hendrie. There was also interest in other Derby players, with Ipswich Town making a bid for Paul Connolly which was rejected and Rob Hulse the subject of a £4m+ bid from Middlesbrough. Hulse rejected the opportunity to move, citing his fondness for club as the reason. It was later revealed that, had the deal gone through, Derby had set up a loan move for Wolverhampton Wanderers striker Sam Vokes as a replacement. An additional striker was eventually brought into the club with the loan signing of Everton youngster James Vaughan until January 2010 on 18 September. Derby increased their defensive options towards the end of the month with the addition of Swedish International right back Fredrik Stoor, who joined on an initial months loan from Premiership side Fulham and Clough revealed the club still has an active interest in young Blackburn goalkeeper Frank Fielding and would make a fresh approach in the January transfer window. Youngsters Greg Mills and Jermaine Johnson also moved out on loan to Solihull Moors and Stafford Rangers respectively.

On the pitch, the club's poor run of results continued as four of the month's five fixtures ended in defeat, including a 6–1 mauling at Cardiff City. The only win came courtesy of an 85th-minute goal from Gary Teale, his third of the season, in a 1–0 home win over Bristol City, a match which saw Dean Moxey perform well enough to feature in the Championship Team of the week. The run coincided with a number of injuries to key first team personnel including Kris Commons, Stephen Pearson, Paul Green and Steve Davies.

Miles Addison became the first Derby player to be capped by the England Under-21s for two years when he came on as a substitute against Greece in a European Under-21 Football Championship qualifier on 8 September. The next day he was nominated for the Championship Player of the month award for August which was won by Newcastle striker Shola Ameobi. Club captain Robbie Savage was charged by the FA for breaches of its regulations regarding agents. Savage and agent George Urquhart were charged over the renegotiation of Savage's Blackburn Rovers contract in 2007, with Urquhart also being charged over Savage's subsequent move to Derby in January 2008. Both Savage and Urquhart were given 14 days to respond to the charges. Savage was eventually left off with a warning, whereas Urquhart was fined £500.

=== October ===
October saw Derby's injury crisis hit new heights with the news that loanee James Vaughan would return to his parent club, Everton, to assess a dead leg he had suffered in his debut against Crystal Palace. Vaughan joined 11 other first teamers on the Derby injury list, a scenario which coincided with Nigel Ashley-Jones leaving his position as the club's strength and conditioning coach, and returned to Everton on 23 October, though Derby signalled their intention to re-sign him on loan in January, provided he was fit. Prior to a match against Sheffield Wednesday, Clough dismissed concerns that the clubs run of just 3 points from 18 constituted a relegation battle, insisting that "The table hasn't even settled down yet to the degree it does after 25 matches or may be by Christmas. If we get the three points against Wednesday it is two wins in three games and we will turn the stats round a little bit to suit us." In the event of the match, the club achieved their biggest win of the season so far as they ran out 3–0 winners, with Lee Croft scoring his first for the club and Rob Hulse reaching 100 career league goals and earning a place in the Championship Team of the week. After the international break, the club faced two away fixtures which saw a 0–0 draw at Leicester City followed with a 0–2 defeat at Middlesbrough. Jay McEveley broke his cheek in the match at Middlesbrough, ruling him out for 8 weeks and taking the club's injury tally up to 14. The return to Pride Park saw the club lose 4–2 at home to Q.P.R. despite being 2–0 up. The results saw Derby drop to 19th in the table and saw Clough admit for the first time concern over the team's plight, going as far as to state "We are still clinging on to the hope when everybody is fit we think we can get a side out to compete." He also praised the club's supporters, despite the pelting of the pitch with free T-shirts as the match drew to a close, saying "I didn't think their reaction was too bad after they had just seen us concede four goals at home. I thought generally throughout the game they were magnificent." The Q.P.R. defeat was followed by another loss, 1–0 away to Ipswich Town, for who the result was their first win of the season. With the injury list running at 16 players Clough admitted that he had looked into the possibility of having the fixture called off.

Away from the pitch, Hull City midfielder Bryan Hughes was signed on a monthlong loan with a view to a permanent move, Fredrik Stoor's loan was extended by two months, though there was a 24-hour recall clause inserted by his parent club Fulham and youngsters Mark Dudley and Arnaud Mendy moved to Alfreton Town and Grimsby Town respectively on a one-month loan deals, Clough also admitted an interest in Ipswich Town's Jon Stead (who had had a loan spell with Derby in the 2006–07 promotion campaign), and there were further links with 16-year-old Mandalskameratene goalkeeper Mats Mørch and Plymouth Argyle's Jamie Mackie.

Towards the end of the month, Adam Pearson left his position as Chairman of football after two years at the club, the Official Club Statement reading "Coming up to the second year anniversary of Adam Pearson's arrival at Derby County Football Club, following lengthy discussions within the Board and investor group, it has been decided by all parties that now is a good time for Adam to pursue new challenges away from Derby County. The decision for Adam to leave has been reached through mutual consent and all parties believe it to be in the best interests of the Club and the individuals involved. The Moor Farm and Pride Park operations will now be unified under the control of Tom Glick, reporting directly into company chairman Andy Appleby."

=== November ===
The month started with the club revealing that Mark O'Brien had successfully undergone heart surgery to correct a valve problem, and that he would be able to resume his career following a three- to four-month recovery period. The problem had been discovered during a routing medical scan for academy players. It was also revealed that Jay McEveley's heart has stopped for two minutes during surgery on the cheekbone he had fractured during the defeat at Middlesbrough, though he was revived and was available, whilst wearing a protective mask for the match against Coventry City, joining the returning Rob Hulse, Dean Leacock and Paul Green. Despite falling behind to a fourth-minute goal from Leon Best, Derby won the match 2–1, with Hulse grabbing two goals and missing a penalty, earning himself a place in the Championship Team of the week, earning his second Team of the week of the season. The win ended a three match losing streak, and a four match winless run, and lifted Derby to 17th in the table going into the third international break of the season. The return to action two weeks later saw a match away to Swansea City end in defeat, the first time Derby had lost to the Swans in 26 years. The month ended with a 2–1 victory over Reading, with Derby again coming from a goal down to win, with Rob Hulse scoring the winner to take his tally for the season to 6. The result lifted Derby to 16th in the table.

The return of Bryan Hughes to Hull City following the completion of his one-month loan freed up numbers in terms of loanees, and Leicester City's DJ Campbell was bought in on a monthlong loan, joining Leicester teammate Paul Dickov. A freak injury to reserve goalkeeper Saul Deeney (who was ruled out for six weeks after twisting his ankle when slipping over in the rain after an unplanned fire drill at the hotel the team were staying at prior to the 1–0 defeat at Swansea) heightened the need for a goalkeeper, and Clough was again linked with a move for frequent target, Blackburn Rover's Frank Fielding, though the move was knocked back by Blackburn. Mark Dudley and Gary Mills were loaned out to Hinckley United and Solihull Moors respectively whilst both Jermaine Johnson and Henrik Ojamaa made one-month loan moves to Stafford Rangers. Young Serbian striker Aleksandar Prijović joined OB Odense on trial, where he impressed with a goal in a trial match. Of Prijović, Derby boss Nigel Clough said "They are very interested in taking him in January so we are just trying to get a deal done if they want to do one. If not, we will probably look to get him out on loan. If we can do it before the deadline, we will do. If not, in January." Fellow striker Luke Varney, away on loan at Sheffield Wednesday was also linked with a permanent move away, though Wednesday boss Brian Laws stated "We're in discussions with Derby, we spoke to them on Tuesday, we've still got to have discussions about what they want to do with the player, bearing in mind he's got two and a bit years left on his contract. We'd be happy to keep Luke Varney but we haven't got any money."

Away from the club, there was controversy surrounding Derby's bid to be a host city for England's 2018 World Cup bid. Derby City Council proposed the raising of £26m through an extra levy of local businesses to help fund the expansion of Pride Park to 45,000 from its current 33,500 capacity for the tournament, which would be reduced to 35,000 to 38,000 after its completion. Carolyn Spencer, from the Derby Federation of Small Businesses, said: "Hairdressers won't benefit, ladies clothes shops, greetings cards shops are not going to benefit. So why should they pay an extra supplementary business rate on top of everything else that they pay to something that is going to give them nothing back whatsoever?" Ultimately Derby was not chosen as one of the host cities for England's World Cup bid.

=== December ===
Derby opened the month with a 2–2 draw at home to second placed West Bromwich Albion. D. J. Campbell made his debut as an 86th minute sub and scored a 94th-minute equaliser on his debut. Campbell's Leicester teammate Paul Dickov had given Derby a first half lead before two controversial West Brom goals in the last 10 minutes had looked to turn the game on its head. A 0–0 draw away to Preston North End extended the Rams unbeaten run to three, their longest unbeaten sequence of the campaign, though it also extended their winless away run to 13 matches and 8 months. The run was ended the following Saturday when Chris Porter, who had only returned to the first team after 9 months out as a 71st-minute substitute for Paul Dickov at Preston, scored in the 77th minute in a 1–0 win away at Watford after again coming on as a substitute. Although the Rams remained 17th in the table after the result, it stretched the gap over the relegation places to 7 points and took them to within 7 points of the playoffs. The club's mini revival came to a halt with 0–2 home defeats to Doncaster Rovers and Blackpool over the festive period before a 0–0 draw away to league leaders Newcastle United saw the club end 2009 5 points clear of the drop zone.

The club entered into numerous contract negotiations. Terminations were offered to Ruben Zadkovich and Giles Barnes, with Barnes accepting his on 11 December 2009. Stephen Pearson signed a new contract to take him through to the end of the 2011–12 season and Ben Pringle and Jake Buxton penned new 18-month deals. The club also confirmed it would enter into discussions with a number of other players nearing the end of their current deals, including Gary Teale and Jay McEveley.

Loans also played a large part in the club's transfer dealings throughout the month. Frederik Stoor and Jake Livermore returned to their parent clubs, Fulham and Tottenham Hotspur respectively, at the end of their loan deals whilst D. J. Campbell's loan spell from Leicester City to 31 January 2010. whilst reports suggested on-loan Goalkeeper Lewis Price's may return earlier than expected fur to being surplus to requirements at Brentford. Mark O'Brien and Jermaine Johnson extended their loan stays at Hinckley United and Stafford Rangers respectively for a further month Former Newcastle United midfielder Mark Doninger was also taken on trial, scoring for the reserves in a 2–1 win over West Bromwich Albion reserves.

With January approaching, reports suggested Wolves had an eye on Kris Commons for a £1.5m fee and Luke Varney intimated his desire to return to Sheffield Wednesday, either temporarily or permanently, following the completion of his second loan spell with the club. Coming in, the club were linked with an £800k move for Bournemouth's Brett Pitman and moves for Swindon Town's Charlie Austin and Oldham Athletic's Chris O'Grady. There were also fresh links with £400k Crewe Alexandra defender John Brayford, and Everton's James Vaughan.

=== January ===
The FA Cup gave Derby their first match of the new year and Kris Commons scored Derby's first goal with a 52nd-minute equaliser away to Millwall in a 1–1 draw in the 3rd round. Derby won the replay 10 days later, 5–3 on penalties after a second 1–1 draw in front of a record Pride Park Stadium low of just 7, 183. This gave the club a fourth round tie with Doncaster Rovers, which ended in a 1–0 victory thanks to Jay McEveley's 88th-minute winner, taking Derby through to the fifth round for the second successive season.

The first leg against Millwall had marked Nigel Clough's 1st anniversary in charge of Derby. Of his time at the club Clough said "I have thoroughly enjoyed the year, it has been hard work but I've relished it. We know we haven't made progress as quickly as we would have hoped, mainly because of the injuries that have hampered us right from pre-season. We still believe we can achieve a good position this season in the Championship and build on that from there." With the winter storms of 2010, Derby's home match against Scunthorpe was one of only four Championship fixtures to go ahead on the weekend of the 9/10 January. The match saw the Rams crash to their third straight home defeat, and their biggest of the season, with a 4–1 loss and saw goalscorer Kris Commons admit that the club were in a relegation battle and Clough described it as his "lowest moment", equating it to the 2–0 home defeat by Q.P.R. in his first game in charge. The match led to some controversy when BBC Radio Derby commentator Colin Gibson insinuated that some of the Derby players were displeased with Clough's backroom staff, leading to club captain Robbie Savage to launch into a scathing attack on the station, claiming it had an agenda against the club and criticising them of being overly negative towards the club. The fall out led to chief executive Tom Glick to come out in support of Clough's management of the club, stating "A year ago we were convinced we made the right decision [appointing Clough] and we're still convinced." On the back of this Derby took 6 points from their next three games, a 1–0 defeat away to Plymouth Argyle sandwiched by a comprehensive 3–0 win away to a Peterborough United side which was reduced to nine men, with Stephen Bywater and D. J. Campbell playing well enough to earn a place in the Championship Team of the week, the first Derby players to make the team since November and a 1–0 home win over local rivals Nottingham Forest. The fixture, as it had been in August, proved controversial as a mass melee again broke out towards the end of the game as Chris Gunter pushed Jay McEveley whilst the latter was taking a throw-in. The FA announced they would investigate the brawl whilst former Derby manager Billy Davies claimed that Nigel Clough had "attacked" him during the melee and made a formal complaint to the League Manager's Association. After investigating the fracas, the FA fined both clubs £35,000 as well as ordered payment of the suspended £10,000 fine from the tie at The City Ground earlier in the campaign. Three Derby players were rewarded with a place in the Championship Team of the week after their strong performances against Forest. Stephen Bywater, Shaun Barker and match winner Rob Hulse all received the accolade along with on-loan striker Luke Varney after his two goals helped Sheffield Wednesday beat Plymouth 2–1.

January also saw the opening of the January Transfer Window, and Derby delved into the loan market to sign Bristol City midfielder Lee Johnson and Bolton Wanderers rightback Nicky Hunt on month long deals, with Hunt's later being extended until the end of the season. The first permanent signing of the window was Russell Anderson, who joined on a free until the end of the season following the cancellation of his contract with Sunderland. Luke Varney, Ross Atkins and Greg Mills all left the club on loan joining Sheffield Wednesday, Burton Albion and Macclesfield Town respectively. Ruben Zadkovich followed them out of the club, though his departure was permanent after he accepted the contract termination offered to him the previous month.

=== February ===
With 31 January 2010 falling on a Sunday, the last day of the 2010 January Transfer window fell, instead, on 1 February 2010. It proved a busy day for Derby, who signed Manchester City's Javan Vidal and Stoke City's Michael Tonge on loan for the rest of the season, freed Aleksandar Prijović to join Swiss club FC Sion and rejected loan bids for Rob Hulse from both Stoke City and Burnley. There was also a £200k move for Millwall's David Martin which collapsed at the last moment, though Nigel Clough intimated the move may be resurrected as a loan when the Emergency Loan window opened, and it was eventually completed with Martin joining on a season long loan on 9 February 2010. Arsenal's Gilles Sunu followed after, signing on loan until the end of the season. Mark Dudley, Ross Atkins and Alex Forde all made loan moves to non-league Hinckley United, Kidderminister Harriers and Solihull Moors respectively. Macclesfield Town's John Rooney, younger brother of Manchester United forward Wayne, was also taken on a week-long trial.

A 1–1 draw at Sheffield United, which saw Derby stretch their improving away form to just 1 defeat in 6 and Robbie Savage and Jake Buxton make the division's Team of the week, was followed up with a convincing 3–0 win over league leaders Newcastle United to jump up to 14th in the table, the club's highest league position since September 2009. The club then exited the FA Cup in the 5th round for the second consecutive season after a 2–1 defeat at home to Birmingham City, but responded with a 5–3 league win over Preston North End, the first time the club had secured consecutive league wins of the season and the first time they had hit 5 in a league game since April 2007, before consecutive defeats at home to promotion chasing Swansea City and West Bromwich Albion. The Swansea City match was marred by a brawl between the Derby and Swansea players after Gorka Pintado was sent off for a "horror tackle" on Robbie Savage. The match also saw Jay McEveley sent off after two yellow cards. F.A. charged Derby with failing to control their players for the third time in the 2009–10 season and charged McEveley with improper conduct. McEveley admitted the charge and was given a £2,500 fine and warned about his future conduct, whereas the club was charged with failing to control its players and handed a fine of £50,000. Explaining the high figure of the fine, taking Derby's fines for the season up to £115,000, the F.A. stated "The Commission was deeply concerned that this was the third occasion in a period of eight months (following the two fracas with Nottingham Forest) that Derby County FC have been charged with a similar offence. Furthermore, the Commission felt the incident could have easily been avoided by stronger restraint from players from both clubs." As a gesture, the players, led by Robbie Savage and management contributed 25% of their weekly earnings to pay the fine.

=== March ===
March began with Javan Vidal's parent club Manchester City activating a 28-day recall clause in the defender's contract, leaving Clough to consider re-entering the loan market with a concrete interest in former Derby Player of the Year Tommy Smith on loan from Portsmouth. However, after Smith suffered a broken cheekbone in Portsmouth's 5–0 defeat at home to Chelsea on 24 March, Clough moved to bring in Wigan Athletic's young polish forward Tomasz Cywka on loan until the end of the season. Several players left on loan, Paul Connolly moving to Sheffield United on a months loan and Lee Hendrie and Ross Atkins moved to Brighton & Hove Albion and Kidderminster Harriers respectively until the end of the season. Arnaud Mendy was due to join League Two Rotherham United on a similar deal, but the paperwork was not completed in time.

Derby returned to winning ways with a 2–0 home win over Watford, their second league double of the season and saw Shaun Barker's performance earn himself a place in the division's Team of the week. An incredible match followed four days after Watford, when the Rams played at Reading. After conceding an early goal, Stephen Bywater went off with a back injury to be replaced by debutant Saul Deeney in the 13th minute. After Gilles Sunu equalised, Reading retook the lead before Deeney gave away a penalty in the 41st minute and was sent off. With no goalkeeper left on the bench, Deeney was replaced in goal by midfielder and captain Robbie Savage. Reading missed their penalty, but scored twice in the second half to send Derby to a 4–1 defeat. With no goalkeepers available, Clough moved swiftly to capture Liverpool's David Martin on a month's loan. Martin made his debut in a 1–2 defeat at Doncaster Rovers and kept his place for a 2–2 draw with Middlesbrough which put Derby firmly in the relegation dogfight after just one win in six games. Bywater returned the following game and, in his next three appearances earned consecutive Championship Team of the week appearances after keeping clean sheet in a 0–0 draw at Hillsborough against Sheffield Wednesday and in a 1–0 win over 4th placed Leicester City. He was joined by Chris Porter in the Team of the week for the win over Leicester and these results, coupled with a 1–1 draw at Q.P.R. saw Derby finish March on a four match unbeaten run and 9 points clear of the relegation zone with just six games to play.

Away from the pitch, the club was the subject of a £37m take over bid from former chairman Peter Gadsby and two other unnamed local businessmen, who expressed disillusionment with the club's American owners and revealed his intention to buy back the club, funded by equity. The bid was described in a statement released by Gadsby as "a serious and substantial one reflecting the current value of the club." He also promised an additional £5m would be made available to Clough to sign players in the summer and expressed his intention to reinitiate the Pride Park Plaza redevelopment which would "provide superb new amenities for the city and its residents, offer considerable benefits to Rams fans and generate significant revenues for the club." The bid was flatly rejected by the club, who stated ""The club is not for sale, we have received an offer, but there's no interest in selling. We are focused on running the business of a football club."

=== April and May ===
April opened with the best possible start as Shaun Barker's 1st half goal in a 1–0 win away to Coventry City took Derby past the 50 points mark, usually enough to secure survival, though a 3–1 defeat at home to Ipswich Town on Easter Monday meant the club was not yet safe. The Ipswich result was compounded by Stephen Pearson earning a two match ban after being sent off for foul and abusive language and manager Nigel Clough earning a charge of improper conduct after he was sent to the stands. He was fined £1,000 and given a one-match ban which he served during the final game of the campaign against Cardiff City. A 0–0 draw with Barnsley left the club needing just a point from its final three games to guarantee survival, which duly arrived with a 1–1 draw with Crystal Palace on 17 April 2010. This meant that it was not possible for both Crystal Palace and Sheffield Wednesday to overtake The Rams as they played each other at Hillsborough on the final day of the season and ensured safety and Derby's place in the 2010–11 Football League Championship. Safety meant that Steve Davies and Stephen Bywater were both rested for the remainder of the campaign, Davies having an ankle operation and Bywater resting a sprained rib joint. Bywater's injury resulted in Ross Atkins being recalled from a loan spell with Kidderminster Harriers. Paul Connolly, who Sheffield United loan was initially extended for another week, returned when it became impossible for Sheffield United to make the playoffs. The season's away fixtures wrapped up with The Rams 13th away defeat of the campaign as the lost 2–1 at Bristol City, meaning Derby had taken just 17 points from a possible 69 on the road. Derby's goalscorer in the game, Stephen Pearson, also underwent knee surgery, ruling him out for four months. Leading scorer Rob Hulse also had an operation on his adductor tendon problem leaving Derby with 14 senior players ruled out for the final game of the season against Cardiff City. One of these, loanee Gilles Sunu, was returned to his parent club, Arsenal, one week early due to the injury. The season ended with a 2–0 win over Cardiff City which helped the club to record a 14th placed league finish and beat the previous season's points total by 2.

Looking towards the 2010–11 season, Alan Tomlinson, who had been with the club as Head Physio since December 2007, left the club to "pursue other interests." The club announced it had agreed a deal to sign ADO Den Haag utility player Danny Buijs once the Dutch football season had finished, and gave Russell Anderson, whose contract expired at the end of the season, a new two-year deal. Goalkeepers Saul Deeney and Ross Atkins also signed new one-year deals. They also confirmed their ongoing interest in Crewe Alexandra defender John Brayford and a desire to continue Michael Tonge's loan from Stoke City into the new campaign. Liverpool youngster Adam Pepper was also taken on trial, scoring in the reserves 3–2 defeat at West Bromwich Albion, and Clough highlighted Scunthorpe United forward Gary Hooper as a "player we admire" and confirmed the loan of Tomasz Cywka from Wigan Athletic was with one eye on next season. The club also announced that Season ticket sales for the following season were matching those for the current campaign, with 2,000 season ticket sales on Friday 16 April 2010 being "one of the single busiest days in the Ticket Office's history." By close of the club's Early Bird offer (which froze 2010–11 Season Tickets at 2009–10 prices) on 18 April 2010, the club had sold 17,357 season tickets, 471 ahead of sales at the same point the previous summer, and claimed they had received calls from "several hundred" supporters who had been prevented from purchasing by the events of the eruption of Eyjafjallajökull.

== End of Season squad ==
Player	Squad number	Position	Signed from	Date	Fee paid	Total Derby appearances*	Total Derby goals*
Stephen Bywater	1	Goalkeeper	West Ham United	29 August 2006	£225k	142/1	0
Paul Connolly	2	Defender	Plymouth Argyle	15 May 2008	Free	68/5	1
Jay McEveley	3	Defender	Blackburn Rovers	29 January 2007	£600k, rising to £1m	84/17	6
Paul Green	4	Midfielder	Doncaster Rovers	1 July 2008	Free	74/3	8
Miles Addison	5	Defender	Trainee	1 July 2005	N/A	52/3	4
Dean Leacock	6	Defender	Fulham	11 August 2006	£375k	89/11	0
Lee Croft	7	Midfielder	Unattached	25 June 2009	N/A	15/6	1
Robbie Savage	8	Midfielder	Blackburn Rovers	9 January 2008	£1.5m	90/5	3
Rob Hulse	9	Forward	Sheffield United	21 July 2008	£1.75m	84/11	30
Kris Commons	10	Midfielder	Unattached	2 June 2008	Free	55/15	11
Gary Teale	11	Midfielder	Wigan Athletic	11 January 2007	£600k	75/29	5
Chris Porter	12	Forward	Motherwell	1 February 2009	£400k	17/13	7
Saul Deeney	13	Goalkeeper	Unattached	31 July 2009	Free	2/1	0
Shaun Barker	14	Defender	Blackpool	15 July 2009	£900k	35/3	5
Luke Varney	15	Forward	Charlton Athletic	27 November 2008	£1m+	10/4	1
Stephen Pearson	16	Midfielder	Celtic	11 January 2007	£750k	82/12	3
Jake Buxton	17	Defender	Burton Albion	1 July 2009	Free	24	1
Ben Pringle	18	Midfielder	Ilkeston Town	1 July 2009	Free	2/4	0
Michael Tonge	19	Midfielder	Stoke City	1 February 2010	Loan	19	2
Steve Davies	20	Forward	Tranmere Rovers	12 June 2008	£275k, rising to £725k	20/26	6
Dean Moxey	21	Defender	Exeter City	26 June 2009	£300k, rising to £500k	31/3	0
Arnaud Mendy	22	Midfielder	Trainee	1 July 2009	N/A	0/1	0
Mark O'Brien	23	Defender	Trainee	1 July 2009	N/A	0/1	0
Nicky Hunt	24	Defender	Bolton Wanderers	7 January 2010	Loan	22/1	0
David Martin	25	Midfielder	Millwall	9 February 2010	Loan	2/9	1
Lee Hendrie	26	Midfielder	Sheffield United	1 September 2009	P/Ex	5/5	0
Russell Anderson	27	Defender	Unattached	15 January 2010	Free	9/6	1
Mitchell Hanson	28	Defender	Trainee	1 July 2007	N/A	0/1	0
Greg Mills	29	Forward	Trainee	1 July 2009	N/A	0/2	0
Tomasz Cywka	31	Forward	Wigan Athletic	25 March 2010	Loan	4/1	0
Mark Dudley	33	Defender	Trainee	1 July 2008	N/A	0/1	0
Ross Atkins	34	Goalkeeper	Trainee	1 July 2009	N/A	0	0
Callum Ball	35	Forward	Trainee	2 January 2009	N/A	0/1	0
Ryan Connolly	36	Midfielder	Trainee	1 January 2010	N/A	0/1	0
James Severn	37	Goalkeeper	Trainee	1 July 2009	N/A	0	0
Jeff Hendrick	38	Midfielder	Trainee	2 May 2010	N/A	0	0

- Up to and including 2 May 2010.

== Transfers ==
=== In ===
Permanent

Player	Squad number	Position	Signed from	Date	Fee paid
Lee Croft	7	Midfielder	Norwich City	25 June 2009	Free
Dean Moxey	21	Midfielder	Exeter City	26 June 2009	£300k
Jake Buxton	17	Defender	Burton Albion	1 July 2009	Free
Ben Pringle	18	Midfielder	Ilkeston Town	1 July 2009	Free
Shaun Barker	14	Defender	Blackpool	15 July 2009	£900k
Saul Deeney	13	Goalkeeper	Burton Albion	31 July 2009	Free
Medi Abalimba	--	Midfielder	Southend United	20 August 2009	Undisclosed
Lee Hendrie	26	Midfielder	Sheffield United	1 September 2009	P/EX
Russell Anderson	27	Defender	Sunderland	15 January 2010	Free

Loan

Player	Squad number	Position	Loaned from	Date	Loan duration
Jake Livermore	24	Midfielder	Tottenham Hotspur	10 August 2009	Five months
Paul Dickov	25	Forward	Leicester City	28 August 2009	Four months
James Vaughan	31	Forward	Everton	18 September 2009	Three and a half months^{[I]}
Fredrik Stoor	27	Defender	Fulham	26 September 2009	Three months
Bryan Hughes	32	Midfielder	Hull City	22 October 2009	One month
DJ Campbell	32	Forward	Leicester City	26 November 2009	Two months
Lee Johnson	19	Midfielder	Bristol City	1 January 2010	One month
Nicky Hunt	24	Defender	Bolton Wanderers	7 January 2010	Five months
Javan Vidal	31	Defender	Manchester City	1 February 2010	Three months^{[II]}
Michael Tonge	19	Midfielder	Stoke City	1 February 2010	Three months
David Martin	25	Midfielder	Millwall	9 February 2010	Three months
Gilles Sunu	32	Forward	Arsenal	19 February 2010	10 weeks^{[III]}
David Martin	30	Goalkeeper	Liverpool	12 March 2010	One month
Tomasz Cywka	31	Forward	Wigan Athletic	25 March 2010	Seven weeks

- Total spending: ▼ ~ £1.2m

=== Out ===
Permanent

Player	Squad number	Position	Signed from	Date	Fee Paid	Total Derby appearances	Total Derby goals	Sold To	Date	Fee received
Andy Todd	22	Defender	Blackburn Rovers	7 July 2007	£700k	26/10	1	Perth Glory	18 May 2009	N/A
Paris Simmons	--	Forward	Trainee	1 August 2007	N/A	0/1	0	End of Contract	18 May 2009	N/A
Mile Sterjovski	16	Midfielder	Gençlerbirliği	24 January 2008	£300k	16/14	2	Perth Glory	11 June 2009	Free
Tyrone Mears	14	Defender	West Ham United	4 July 2007	£1m	39/9	2	Burnley	30 June 2009	£500k
Emanuel Villa	10	Forward	Tecos UAG	4 January 2008	£2m	25/28	9	Cruz Azul	2 July 2009	£1.5m
Liam Dickinson	29	Forward	Stockport County	1 July 2008	£750k	0	0	Brighton & Hove Albion	14 July 2009	£300k
Lewin Nyatanga	19	Defender	Trainee	24 August 2005	N/A	69/7	4	Bristol City	15 July 2009	£500k
Roy Carroll	--	Goalkeeper	Rangers	31 January 2008	Free	38 (0)	0	Odense Boldklub	17 August 2009	Free
Claude Davis	--	Defender	Sheffield United	25 July 2007	£3m	29/2	0	Crystal Palace	30 August 2009	Free
Martin Albrechtsen	--	Defender	West Bromwich Albion	30 June 2008	Free	42	3	FC Midtjylland	30 August 2009	Free
Jordan Stewart	--	Defender	Unattached	30 May 2008	Free	33 (0)	2	Sheffield United	1 September 2009	P/EX
Giles Barnes	19	Midfielder	Trainee	1 July 2005	N/A	66/28	13	Released	11 December 2009	Free
Ruben Zadkovich	--	Midfielder	Sydney FC	17 April 2008	Free	2/5	0	Released	23 January 2010	Free
Aleksandar Prijović	--	Striker	Unattached	7 August 2008	Free	0	0	FC Sion	1 February 2010	Free

Loan

Player	Squad number	Position	Loaned to	Date	Loan duration
Lewis Price	--	Goalkeeper	Brentford	8 July 2009	Season Long
Luke Varney	15	Forward	Sheffield Wednesday	21 August 2009	Four months
Greg Mills	29	Forward	Solihull Moors	10 September 2009	Two months^{[IV]}
Jermaine Johnson	--	Defender	Stafford Rangers	10 September 2009	One month
Mark Dudley	33	Defender	Alfreton Town	3 October 2009	One month^{[V]}
Arnaud Mendy	22	Midfielder	Grimsby Town	16 October 2009	One month^{[VI]}
Mark Dudley	33	Defender	Hinckley United	14 November 2009	Two months
Jermaine Johnson	--	Defender	Stafford Rangers	18 November 2009	Two months
Greg Mills	29	Forward	Solihull Moors	19 November 2009	Six weeks
Henrik Ojamaa	--	Forward	Stafford Rangers	27 November 2009	One month
Luke Varney	15	Forward	Sheffield Wednesday	21 January 2010	Five months
Ross Atkins	34	Goalkeeper	Burton Albion	22 January 2010	One month
Greg Mills	29	Striker	Macclesfield Town	29 January 2010	One month
Mark Dudley	33	Defender	Hinckley United	5 February 2010	One month
Ross Atkins	34	Goalkeeper	Kidderminster Harriers	18 February 2010	Two months^{[VII]}
Alex Forde	--	Defender	Solihull Moors	22 February 2010	One month
Paul Connolly	2	Defender	Sheffield United	16 March 2010	Five weeks
Lee Hendrie	26	Midfielder	Brighton & Hove Albion	23 March 2010	Seven weeks

- Total income: ▲ ~ £2.8 million

Notes
I Vaughan returned to Everton on 24 October due to injury.
II Manchester City recalled Vidal from his loan spell after activating a clause in the deal.
III Sunu returned to Arsenal early when a shin injury ruled him out of the final game of the season.
IV Mills returned to Derby a few days into his second month on loan due to Derby's injury list.
V Dudley was recalled from his loan spell at Alfreton after 28-day.
VI Mendy returned to Derby on 30 October, after Grimsby cancelled his loan early
VII Atkins as recalled on 20 April after a rib injury saw Stephen Bywater ruled out for the rest of the season.

== Results ==
Win	Draw	Loss

=== Friendlies ===
Date	Competition	Opponent	Venue	Result	Scorers	Attendance
11 July 2009	Friendly	Burton Albion	A	1–0	Porter 19'	Unknown
18 July 2009	Derbyshire FA Centenary Cup	Chesterfield	A	1–2	Green 16'	3,716
21 July 2009	Friendly	Yeovil Town	A	2–0	Davies 73' (pen.), 79'	Unknown
23 July 2009	Friendly	Torquay United	A	0–0		Unknown
25 July 2009	Friendly	Exeter City	A	3–1	Green 30', 59', Davies 50'	2,785 (503 away)
28 July 2009	Friendly	Notts County	A	3–2	Davies 25', Savage 35', Commons 78'	3,859 (1,182 away)
1 August 2009	Friendly	Stoke City	H	2–2	Pearson 49', Mendy 90+5'	23,259
1 September 2009	Friendly	Atlético Marbella	A	2–0	Pringle 44', Teale 78' (pen)	Unknown
5 October 2009	Friendly	Ilkeston Town	A	4–1	Teale 23', Ojamaa 80', Prijović 82', Mendy 90'	Unknown
12 November 2009	Friendly	ADO Den Haag	A	0–1		Unknown
22 December 2009	Friendly	Burton Albion	H	2–2	Prijović (??), Mills (??)	Unknown

=== Football League Championship ===
Date	Match No.	Time	Opponent	Venue	Result	Scorers	Attendance	Referee	Pos.
8 August 2009	1	15:00	Peterborough United	H	2–1	Addison 4', Teale 87'	33,010	P. Taylor (Enfield)	2
15 August 2009	2	15:00	Scunthorpe United	A	2–3	Green 20', Commons 60' (pen.)	7,352 (2,092 away)	G. W. Horwood (Bedfordshire)	9
18 August 2009	3	19:45	Blackpool	A	0–0		8,056 (1,303 away)	E. L. Ilderton (Tyne and Wear)	12
22 August 2009	4	15:00	Plymouth Argyle	H	2–1	Buxton 40', Addison 89'	26,186 (526 away)	C. L. Pawson (S. Yorkshire)	10
29 August 2009	5	13:00	Nottingham Forest	A	2–3	Morgan (O.G.) 51', Livermore 62'	28,143 (4,376 away)	M. Atkinson (W. Yorkshire)	11
12 September 2009	6	13:00	Sheffield United	H	0–1		28,441 (2,743 away)	A. D'Urso (Essex)	15
15 September 2009	7	19:45	Barnsley	H	2–3	Hulse 27', Barker 90'	27,609 (748 away)	N. Miller (Co. Durham)	15
19 September 2009	8	15:00	Crystal Palace	A	0–1		12,760 (963 away)	M. Oliver (Northumberland)	17
26 September 2009	9	15:00	Bristol City	H	1–0	Teale 85'	27,144	M. Russell (Hertfordshire)	16
29 September 2009	10	19:45	Cardiff City	A	1–6	Hulse 47'	18,670	S. A. Hooper (Wiltshire)	20
3 October 2009	11	15:00	Sheffield Wednesday	H	3–0	Croft 17', McEveley 65', Hulse 90' (pen.)	30,116 (2,858 away)	C. Foy (St. Helens)	17
17 October 2009	12	15:00	Leicester City	A	0–0		28,875 (3,307 away)	M. Dean (Wirral)	17
20 October 2009	13	19:45	Middlesbrough	A	0–2		17,459 (385 away)	J. Moss (Yorkshire)	19
24 October 2009	14	17:30	Q.P.R.	H	2–4	Dickov 9', Savage 36'	30,135 (733 away)	M. Haywood (W. Yorkshire)	19
31 October 2009	15	15:00	Ipswich Town	A	0–1		20,299 (500 away)	A. Taylor (Cheshire)	20
7 November 2009	16	19:45	Coventry City	H	2–1	Hulse 49' 62'	26, 511 (681 away)	P. T. Crossley (Kent)	17
20 November 2009	17	19:45	Swansea City	A	0–1		17, 804 (420 away)	R. East (Wiltshire)	18
28 November 2009	18	15:00	Reading	H	2–1	Green 60', Hulse 73'	30,174	A. Haines (Tyne & Wear)	16
5 December 2009	19	15:00	West Bromwich	H	2–2	Dickov 42', Campbell 90+4'	30,127 (3, 065 away)	D. Deadman (Cambridgeshire)	17
8 December 2009	20	19:45	Preston North End	A	0–0		11, 755	P. Gibbs (Birmingham)	17
12 December 2009	21	15:00	Watford	A	1–0	Porter 77'	14,063 (894 away)	K. Stroud (Gillingham)	17
19 December 2009	22	15:00	Doncaster Rovers	H	0–2		28, 734	T. Kettle (Berkshire)	18
26 December 2009	23	15:00	Blackpool	H	0–2		30, 313 (1, 218 away)	S. Mathieson (Stockport)	18
28 December 2009	24	17:20	Newcastle United	A	0–0		47, 505 (2,200 away)	K. Wright (Cambridgeshire)	18
9 January 2010	25	15:00	Scunthorpe United	H	1–4	Williams (O.G.) 59'	28,106 (754 away)	K. Wolmer (Northampton)	18
16 January 2010	26	15:00	Peterborough United	A	3–0	Davies 45+3' (pen.), Campbell 48', 75'	10,280 (2,517 away)	N. Miller (Co. Durham)	18
26 January 2010	27	19:45	Plymouth Argyle	A	0–1		7,996 (504 away)	A. Hall (Birmingham)	19
30 January 2010	28	13:00	Nottingham Forest	H	1–0	Hulse 79'	32,674	N. Swarbrick (Lancashire)	17
6 February 2010	29	15:00	Sheffield United	A	1–1	Savage 17'	25,300	G. Salisbury (Lancashire)	18
9 February 2010	30	19:45	Newcastle United	H	3–0	Hulse 40', Commons, Barker 64',	28,607 (2,413 away)	A. Taylor (Greater Manchester)	14
16 February 2010	31	19:45	Preston North End	H	5–3	Jones (O.G.) 34', Commons 50', Hulse 64', 77', Barker 68'	26,993 (500 away)	C. L. Pawson (S. Yorkshire)	12
20 February 2010	32	15:00	Swansea City	H	0–1		31,024 (1,407 away)	S.Tanner (Somerset)	14
28 February 2010	33	15:00	West Bromwich Albion	A	1–3	Porter 49'	23,335 (2,200 away)	P. T. Crossley (Kent)	16
6 March 2010	34	15:00	Watford	H	2–0	Tonge 12', Porter 78'	29,492 (776 away)	G. W. Horwood (Bedfordshire)	14
10 March 2010	35	20:00	Reading	A	1–4	Sunu 12'	14,096 (680 away)	K. Wright (Cambridgeshire)	16
13 March 2010	36	15:00	Doncaster Rovers	A	1–2	Hulse 74'	11,858 (2,153 away)	S. A. Hooper (Wiltshire)	18
16 March 2010	37	19:45	Middlesbrough	H	2–2	Porter 67', Tonge 74'	27,143 (628 away)	D. J. Phillips (W. Sussex)	17
20 March 2010	38	15:00	Sheffield Wednesday	A	0–0		21,827 (2,750 away)	J. Linington (Isle of Wight)	18
23 March 2010	39	19:45	Queens Park Rangers	A	1–1	Barker 67'	12,569 (783 away)	M. Russell (Hertfordshire)	18
27 March 2010	40	15:00	Leicester City	H	1–0	King (O.G.) 19'	30,259 (3,055 away)	C. Webster (Tyne & Wear)	17
3 April 2010	41	15:00	Coventry City	A	1–0	Barker 20'	17,630 (1,821 away)	A. D'Urso (Essex)	15
5 April 2010	42	15:00	Ipswich Town	H	1–3	Hulse 83'	28,137 (1,036 away)	J. Moss (Yorkshire)	16
10 April 2010	43	15:00	Barnsley	A	0–0		13,034 (1,993 away)	P. Taylor (Enfield)	16
17 April 2010	44	15:00	Crystal Palace	H	1–1	Anderson 6'	30,255 (1,428 away)	A. Bates (Stoke-On-Trent)	15
24 April 2010	45	15:00	Bristol City	A	1–2	Pearson 86'	15,835 (1,757 away)	C. L. Pawson (S. Yorkshire)	17
2 May 2010	46	13:00	Cardiff City	H	2–0	McEveley 48', Martin 62'	31,102 (2,257 away)	C. H. Webster	14

=== FA Cup ===
Date	Round	Time	Opponent	Venue	Result	Scorers	Attendance	Referee
2 January 2010	3rd round	15:00	Millwall	A	1–1	Commons 52'	10,531 (1,387 away)	J. Linington (Newport)
12 January 2010	3rd round replay	19:45	Millwall	H	1–1 (a.e.t.); 5–3 (Pens)	Davies 114'	7,183	D. Foster (Newcastle)
23 January 2010	4th round	15:00	Doncaster Rovers	H	1–0	McEveley 88'	11,316 (1,453 away)	C. Webster (Tyne & Wear)
13 February 2010	5th round	15:00	Birmingham City	H	1–2	McEveley 55'	21,043 (5,000 away)	M. Atkinson (Leeds)

=== League Cup ===
Date	Round	Time	Opponent	Venue	Result	Scorers	Attendance	Referee
11 August 2009	1st round	19:45	Rotherham United	A	1–2	Teale 11'	4,345	D. Webb (Co. Durham)

== Squad statistics ==
=== Appearances, goals and cards ===
Last Updated – 24 April 2010

No.	Pos.	Name	League		FA Cup		League Cup		Total		Discipline	
No.	Pos.	Name	Apps	Goals	Apps	Goals	Apps	Goals	Apps	Goals	Yellow card	Red card
1	GK	Stephen Bywater	42	0	4	0	1	0	47	0	1	0
2	DF	Paul Connolly	17/4	0	1	0	1	0	19/4	0	6	0
3	DF	Jay McEveley	28/5	2	1/1	2	0/1	0	29/7	4	7	2
4	MF	Paul Green	30/3	2	4	0	0	0	34/3	2	0	0
5	DF	Miles Addison	10/3	2	2	0	1	0	13/3	2	1	0
6	DF	Dean Leacock	13/4	0	0	0	0	0	13/4	0	3	0
7	MF	Lee Croft	14/5	1	1	0	1	0	16/5	1	3	0
8	MF	Robbie Savage	45/1	2	3	0	1	0	49/1	2	5	0
9	FW	Rob Hulse	31/6	12	2/1	0	0	0	33/7	12	5	0
10	MF	Kris Commons	11/9	3	3/1	1	0	0	14/10	4	1	0
11	MF	Gary Teale	21/7	2	0/2	0	1	1	22/9	3	2	0
12	FW	Chris Porter	11/10	4	3	0	0	0	14/10	4	0	0
13	GK	Saul Deeney	2/1	0	0	0	0	0	2/1	0	0	1
14	DF	Shaun Barker	33/2	5	2/1	0	0	0	35/3	5	1	0
15	FW	Luke Varney	0/1	0	0	0	0/1	0	0/2	0	0	0
16	MF	Stephen Pearson	34/3	1	4	0	1	0	39/3	1	5	1
17	DF	Jake Buxton	19	1	4	0	1	0	24	1	4	0
18	MF	Ben Pringle	1/4	0	0	0	1	0	2/4	0	0	0
19	MF	Giles Barnes	0	0	0	0	0	0	0	0	0	0
19	MF	Lee Johnson	4	0	2/1	0	0	0	6/1	0	0	0
19	MF	Michael Tonge	18	2	1	0	0	0	19	2	0	0
20	FW	Steve Davies	7/11	1	1/2	1	1	0	8/13	2	0	0
21	DF	Dean Moxey	27/3	0	3	0	1	0	31/3	0	5	1
22	MF	Arnaud Mendy	0/1	0	0	0	0	0	0/1	0	0	0
23	DF	Mark O'Brien	0	0	0	0	0	0	0	0	0	0
24	MF	Jake Livermore	11/5	1	0	0	0	0	11/5	1	2	0
24	DF	Nicky Hunt	20/1	0	2	0	0	0	22/1	0	3	0
25	FW	Paul Dickov	10/6	2	0	0	0	0	10/6	2	3	0
25	MF	David Martin	2/9	1	0	0	0	0	2/9	1	0	0
26	MF	Lee Hendrie	4/5	0	1	0	0	0	5/5	0	0	0
27	DF	Fredrik Stoor	10/1	0	0	0	0	0	10/1	0	2	0
27	DF	Russell Anderson	9/6	1	0	0	0	0	9/6	1	0	0
28	DF	Mitchell Hanson	0	0	0	0	0	0	0	0	0	0
29	FW	Greg Mills	0/2	0	0	0	0	0	0/2	0	0	0
30	GK	David Martin	2	0	0	0	0	0	2	0	0	0
31	FW	Tomasz Cywka	4/1	0	0	0	0	0	4/1	0	0	0
31	FW	James Vaughan	2	0	0	0	0	0	2	0	0	0
31	DF	Javan Vidal	0/1	0	0	0	0	0	0/1	0	0	0
32	MF	Bryan Hughes	3	0	0	0	0	0	3	0	0	0
32	FW	DJ Campbell	6/2	3	0	0	0	0	6/2	3	0	0
32	FW	Gilles Sunu	6/3	1	0	0	0	0	6/3	1	0	0
33	DF	Mark Dudley	0	0	0	0	0	0	0	0	0	0
34	GK	Ross Atkins	0	0	0	0	0	0	0	0	0	0
35	FW	Callum Ball	0/1	0	0	0	0	0	0/1	0	0	0
36	MF	Ryan Connolly	0/1	0	0	0	0	0	0	0/1	0	0
37	GK	James Severn	0	0	0	0	0	0	0	0	0	0
38	MF	Jeff Hendrick	0	0	0	0	0	0	0	0	0	0

== Records ==
=== Club ===
Record	Statistic	Dates(s)
Biggest Win	3–0 v Sheffield Wednesday Peterborough United & Newcastle United	3 October 2009 16 January 2010 9 February 2010
Biggest Defeat	1–6 v Cardiff City	29 September 2009
Consecutive Victories	2	9 February 2010 – 20 February 2010 27 March 2010 – 5 April 2010
Unbeaten Run	5	16 March 2010 – 5 April 2010
Consecutive Defeats	4	29 August 2009 – 26 September 2009
Winless Run	4	29 August 2009 – 26 September 2009 19 December 2009 – 16 January 2010 5 April 2010 – 2 May 2010

(The above statistics refer to league matches only)

=== Individuals ===
League

Most league appearances:

Pos	Player	Apps (Subs)
1	Robbie Savage	45/1
2	Stephen Bywater	42
3	Stephen Pearson	34/3
4	Rob Hulse	31/6
5	Shaun Barker	33/2

Most league goals:

Pos	Player	Goals
1	Rob Hulse	12
2	Shaun Barker	5
3	Chris Porter	4
4	D. J. Campbell	3
=	Kris Commons	3

All competitions

Most appearances:

Pos	Player	Apps (Subs)
1	Robbie Savage	49/1
2	Stephen Bywater	47
3	Stephen Pearson	39/3
4	Rob Hulse	32/7
5	Paul Green	34/3

Most Goals:

Pos	Player	Goals
1	Rob Hulse	12
2	Shaun Barker	5
3	Kris Commons	4
=	Chris Porter	4
5	D. J. Campbell	3

=== End-of-season awards ===
Award	Player
Jack Stamps Player of the Year	Shaun Barker
Club Player of the Year	Robbie Savage
Sammy Crooks Young Player of the Year	Ben Pringle
Academy Player of the Year	Mason Bennett
Scholar of the Year	Ryan Connolly
Goal of the Season	Michael Tonge v Watford
Special Achievement	Gordon Guthrie

== Reserves ==
As part of the 2009–10 season, Clough announced his attention to bring back a Derby County reserve side which, apart from one season, had been dormant since the end of 2004. The aim was to use the team as a basis in which to blood young players for an eventual role in the first team, something which the lack of a reserve side in recent seasons had hindered. The club entered into The Central League Division One Central Section, thought not the Central League Cup, and played its home games at Alfreton Town's Impact Arena. The reserves first season back proved successful as they claimed The Central League Division One Central Section title, finishing a point clear of runners-up Burton Albion, and became the first Derby County reserves side to win its respective division since the club successfully captured the Premier Reserve League in 2000–01.

=== Results ===
==== Preseason ====
Date	Competition	Opponents	Home/ Away	Result F – A	Scorers
14 July 2009	Friendly	Arnold Town	A	5–1	Johnson 8', Pringle 38', 85', Prijović 57', Ojamaa 68'
20 July 2009	Friendly	Belper Town	A	7–2	Prijović 16', 42', Pringle 20', Mendy 36', Mills 79', 90', Ojamaa 87'
27 July 2009	Friendly	Matlock Town	A	3–2	Mendy 14', Mills 34', Prijović 80'
30 July 2009	Bass Charity Vase	Burton Albion	A	0–1
31 July 2009	Friendly	Alfreton Town	A	0–3
4 August 2009	Friendly	Solihull Moors	A	1–1	Commons 33' (pen.)
8 September 2009	Friendly	Leicester City Reserves	N/A	1–3	Mills (?? pen)
17 March 2010	Friendly	Crewe Alexandra	N/A	1–3	Buxton (??)

==== Division One Central ====
Date	Match No.	K.O.	Opponents	Home/ Away	Full Time F – A	Derby Scorers	Pos
27 August 2009	1	7.00pm	Shrewsbury Town	A	4–0	Hooman (O.G.) 53', Mendy 57', Johnson 65', Ojamaa 83'	1
16 September 2009	2	7.00pm	Burton Albion	A	0–3		4
22 September 2009	3	7.00pm	Walsall	A	2–1	Pringle 25', Hendrie 53'	3
14 October 2009	4	7.00pm	Port Vale	H	1–1	Prijović 16'	3
28 October 2009	5	7.00pm	Macclesfield Town	H	1–2	Prijović 46'	4
11 November 2009	6	2.00pm	Sheffield United	A	4–1	Johnson 5', Ojamma 10', Prijović 37', 55'	3
25 November 2009	7	2.00pm	Sheffield Wednesday	A	0–0		4
9 December 2009	8	2.00pm	West Bromwich Albion	H	2–1	Doninger 21', Livermore 37'	2
13 January 2010	9	2.00pm	Walsall	H	3–0	McEveley 18', Campbell 29', 53'	1
17 February 2010	10	7.45pm	Macclesfield Town	A	1–0	Ball 82'	1
3 March 2010	11	2.00pm	Sheffield Wednesday	H	1–0	R. Connolly 49'	1
24 March 2010	12	2.00pm	Sheffield United	H	3–0	Mills 29', 85', Pringke 58'	1
29 March 2010	13	7.00pm	Port Vale	A	1–4	Mills 77'	1
12 April 2010	14	7.00pm	West Bromwich Albion	A	2–3	Moxey 43', Pepper 56'	1
21 April 2010	15	7.00pm	Burton Albion	H	1–2	Mills 61'	2
29 April 2010	16	2.00pm	Shrewsbury Town	H	2–1	Hunt 20', Commons 43'	1

=== Player statistics ===
Pos.	Name	Total	
Pos.	Name	Apps	Goals
MF	Medi Abalimba	2	0
MF	Miles Addison	1	0
DF	Martin Albrechtsen	1	0
DF	Russell Anderson	1	0
GK	Ross Atkins	6	0
MF	Callum Ball	2/8	1
DF	Shaun Barker	1	0
DF	Jason Beardsley	3	0
DF	Jake Buxton	3	0
FW	D. J. Campbell	1	2
MF	Nigel Clough	0/1	0
DF	Aaron Cole	1	0
MF	Kris Commons	2	1
DF	Paul Connolly	5	0
MF	Ryan Connolly	3/6	1
MF	Lee Croft	8	0
FW	Tomasz Cywka	2	0
FW	Steve Davies	3	0
GK	Saul Deeney	9	0
FW	Paul Dickov	2	0

Pos.	Name	Total	
Pos.	Name	Apps	Goals
FW	Aaron Dillon	2/1	0
MF	Mark Doninger	2	1
DF	Mark Dudley	7/1	0
DF	Alex Forde	4/3	0
DF	Luke Garton	2/1	0
DF	Mitchell Hanson	3	0
MF	Lee Hendrie	5	1
MF	Jeff Hendrick	1/7	0
DF	Nicky Hunt	2	1
DF	Jermaine Johnson	4/1	2
DF	Kallum Keane	1/6	0
MF	Graham Kelly	0/1	0
MF	Paul Lawless	0/1	0
DF	Dean Leacock	3	0
MF	Jake Livermore	1	1
GK	David Martin	1	0
MF	David Martin	6	0
DF	Jay McEveley	5	1
DF	James McGuinness	1	0
MF	Arnaud Mendy	15	1

Pos.	Name	Total	
Pos.	Name	Apps	Goals
MF	Greg Mills	8/2	4
DF	Dean Moxey	6	1
DF	Mark O'Brien	0/2	0
FW	Henrik Ojamaa	5/1	2
MF	Stephen Pearson	1	0
FW	Adam Pepper	2	1
FW	Chris Porter	2	0
FW	Aleksandar Prijović	6	4
MF	Ben Pringle	13	2
MF	John Rooney	1	0
MF	Robbie Savage	1	0
GK	James Severn	0/2	0
DF	Jordan Stewart	1	0
FW	Gilles Sunu	1	0
MF	Gary Teale	6	0
MF	Michael Tonge	1	0
FW	Luke Varney	1	0
MF	Javan Vidal	1	0
FW	Kamal Whight	0/1	0
MF	Alex Witham	0/1	0
