= List of English football transfers winter 2009–10 =

This is a list of English football transfers for the 2009–10 winter transfer window. Only moves featuring at least one Premier League or Championship club are listed.

The winter transfer window opened on 1 January 2010, although a few transfers took place prior to that date. The window closed at 17:00 GMT on 1 February. Players without a club could join at any time. Clubs below Premier League level could also sign players on loan at any time. Clubs could also sign a goalkeeper on an emergency loan, if all others were unavailable.

As punishment for a reported attempt to have Gaël Kakuta abandon Lens' youth team, Chelsea were originally banned by FIFA from signing new players during the winter period; however, the Court of Arbitration for Sport suspended the transfer ban, which allowed Chelsea to sign new players. Portsmouth had a transfer embargo placed on them but it was removed, which allowed Portsmouth to only sign players for free or on loan.

== Transfers ==
Date	Player	Moving from	Moving to	Fee
2 September 2009	Jan Vennegoor of Hesselink	Unattached	Hull City	Free
2 September 2009	Jimmy Walker	Unattached	Tottenham Hotspur	Free
6 September 2009	Afonso Alves	Middlesbrough	Al-Sadd	Undisclosed
10 September 2009	James Henry	Reading	Millwall	Loan
10 September 2009	Craig Noone	Plymouth Argyle	Exeter City	Loan
10 September 2009	Cedric van der Gun	Unattached	Swansea City	Free
10 September 2009	Danny Webber	Unattached	Portsmouth	Free
11 September 2009	Levi Porter	Leicester City	Mansfield Town	Loan
11 September 2009	Darren Ward	Wolverhampton Wanderers	Millwall	Loan
14 September 2009	Craig Cathcart	Manchester United	Watford	Loan
15 September 2009	Jamie Devitt	Hull City	Darlington	Loan
15 September 2009	Heiðar Helguson	Queens Park Rangers	Watford	Loan
15 September 2009	Michael Ngoo	Southend United	Liverpool	Free
15 September 2009	Sean St Ledger	Preston North End	Middlesbrough	Loan
15 September 2009	Bence Szabó	Újpest	Wolverhampton Wanderers	Loan
16 September 2009	Ryan Flynn	Liverpool	Falkirk	Undisclosed
16 September 2009	Julian Gray	Unattached	Barnsley	Free
16 September 2009	Kayode Odejayi	Barnsley	Colchester United	Loan
16 September 2009	Roy O'Donovan	Sunderland	Southend United	Loan
17 September 2009	Danny Batth	Wolverhampton Wanderers	Colchester United	Loan
17 September 2009	Danny Blanchett	Peterborough United	Hereford United	Loan
17 September 2009	Caleb Folan	Hull City	Middlesbrough	Loan
17 September 2009	Guillermo Franco	Unattached	West Ham United	Free
17 September 2009	Zurab Khizanishvili	Blackburn Rovers	Newcastle United	Loan
17 September 2009	Craig King	Leicester City	Hereford United	Loan
17 September 2009	Shane Lowry	Aston Villa	Plymouth Argyle	Loan
17 September 2009	Danny Mills	Peterborough United	Torquay United	Loan
17 September 2009	Lucas Neill	Unattached	Everton	Free
17 September 2009	Dean Parrett	Tottenham Hotspur	Aldershot Town	Loan
17 September 2009	Sergio Torres	Peterborough United	Lincoln City	Loan
18 September 2009	Andrew Davies	Stoke City	Sheffield United	Loan
18 September 2009	Nathan Doyle	Hull City	Barnsley	Loan
18 September 2009	Jonathan Fortune	Unattached	Sheffield United	Free
18 September 2009	James Vaughan	Everton	Derby County	Loan
19 September 2009	James Chester	Manchester United	Plymouth Argyle	Loan
19 September 2009	David Gray	Manchester United	Plymouth Argyle	Loan
21 September 2009	Shaun MacDonald	Swansea City	Yeovil Town	Loan
22 September 2009	Suad Filekovič	Unattached	Barnsley	Free
23 September 2009	Carl Dickinson	Stoke City	Barnsley	Loan
23 September 2009	John Johnson	Middlesbrough	Northampton Town	Loan
23 September 2009	Ryan Shotton	Stoke City	Barnsley	Loan
24 September 2009	Marlon Harewood	Aston Villa	Newcastle United	Loan
24 September 2009	Daniel Jones	Wolverhampton Wanderers	Notts County	Loan
26 September 2009	Fredrik Stoor	Fulham	Derby County	Loan
28 September 2009	Bartosz Białkowski	Southampton	Barnsley	Loan
29 September 2009	Ádám Bogdán	Bolton Wanderers	Crewe Alexandra	Loan
29 September 2009	Richard Cresswell	Stoke City	Sheffield United	Loan
29 September 2009	Billy Crook	Peterborough United	Histon	Loan
29 September 2009	Frank Fielding	Blackburn Rovers	Leeds United	Loan
29 September 2009	Danny Rose	Tottenham Hotspur	Peterborough United	Loan
29 September 2009	Marcel Seip	Plymouth Argyle	Blackpool	Loan
29 September 2009	Ben Wright	Peterborough United	Luton Town	Loan
29 September 2009	Jason Jarrett	Unattached	Port Vale	Free
1 October 2009	Anthony Edgar	West Ham United	Bournemouth	Loan
1 October 2009	Hólmar Örn Eyjólfsson	West Ham United	Cheltenham Town	Loan
2 October 2009	Adam Watts	Fulham	Lincoln City	Loan
3 October 2009	Mark Dudley	Derby County	Alfreton Town	Loan
5 October 2009	Michail Antonio	Reading	Southampton	Loan
5 October 2009	Aaron Doran	Blackburn Rovers	Milton Keynes Dons	Loan
5 October 2009	Antonio German	Queens Park Rangers	Aldershot Town	Loan
5 October 2009	Mark Little	Wolverhampton Wanderers	Chesterfield	Loan
6 October 2009	Jamie Guy	Colchester United	Port Vale	Loan
7 October 2009	Jonathan Lund	Unattached	Burnley	Free
8 October 2009	Romone Rose	Queens Park Rangers	Cheltenham Town	Loan
8 October 2009	Robbie Threlfall	Liverpool	Darlington	Loan
9 October 2009	Gavin Hoyte	Arsenal	Brighton & Hove Albion	Loan
9 October 2009	Arron Jameson	Sheffield Wednesday	Harrogate Town	Loan
12 October 2009	Moses Barnett	Everton	Darlington	Loan
12 October 2009	Simon Gillett	Southampton	Doncaster Rovers	Loan
14 October 2009	Asmir Begović	Portsmouth	Ipswich Town	Loan
14 October 2009	Lee Butcher	Tottenham Hotspur	Leyton Orient	Loan
14 October 2009	Josh Magennis	Cardiff City	Grimsby Town	Loan
15 October 2009	Matt Fry	West Ham United	Gillingham	Loan
16 October 2009	Frankie Artus	Bristol City	Cheltenham Town	Loan
16 October 2009	Michael Coulson	Barnsley	Chester City	Loan
16 October 2009	Scott Davies	Reading	Wycombe Wanderers	Loan
16 October 2009	David Martin	Liverpool	Tranmere Rovers	Loan
16 October 2009	Arnaud Mendy	Derby County	Grimsby Town	Loan
16 October 2009	Ben Smith	Doncaster Rovers	Morcambe	Loan
16 October 2009	Boudewijn Zenden	Unattached	Sunderland	Free
19 October 2009	Max Gradel	Leicester City	Leeds United	Loan
19 October 2009	Chris Hussey	AFC Wimbledon	Coventry City	Loan
19 October 2009	Gary Madine	Carlisle United	Coventry City	Loan
19 October 2009	Sam Vokes	Wolverhampton Wanderers	Leeds United	Loan
22 October 2009	Nathan Baker	Aston Villa	Lincoln City	Loan
22 October 2009	Henri Camara	Unattached	Sheffield United	Free
22 October 2009	James Collins	Aston Villa	Darlington	Loan
22 October 2009	David Davis	Wolverhampton Wanderers	Darlington	Loan
22 October 2009	Jamie Devitt	Hull City	Shrewsbury Town	Loan
22 October 2009	Waide Fairhurst	Doncaster Rovers	Shrewsbury Town	Loan
22 October 2009	Bryan Hughes	Hull City	Derby County	Loan
22 October 2009	Eric Lichaj	Aston Villa	Lincoln City	Loan
22 October 2009	Josh Payne	West Ham United	Colchester United	Loan
23 October 2009	Scott Griffiths	Dagenham & Redbridge	Peterborough United	Loan
23 October 2009	Danny Mills	Peterborough United	Rushden & Diamonds	Loan
23 October 2009	Mark Oxley	Hull City	Walsall	Loan
28 October 2009	Carl Ikeme	Wolverhampton Wanderers	Charlton Athletic	Loan
28 October 2009	Sergio Torres	Peterborough United	Lincoln City	Loan
29 October 2009	Ben Amos	Manchester United	Peterborough United	Loan
30 October 2009	Marcus Bent	Birmingham City	Middlesbrough	Loan
30 October 2009	George Friend	Wolverhampton Wanderers	Scunthorpe United	Loan
4 November 2009	Leon Barnett	West Bromwich Albion	Coventry City	Loan
4 November 2009	Febian Brandy	Manchester United	Gillingham	Loan
4 November 2009	Daryl Flahavan	Crystal Palace	Oldham Athletic	Loan
4 November 2009	Lee Hills	Crystal Palace	Oldham Athletic	Loan
5 November 2009	Isaiah Osbourne	Aston Villa	Middlesbrough	Loan
6 November 2009	Jack Ainsley	Ipswich Town	Rushden & Diamonds	Loan
9 November 2009	Damien McCrory	Plymouth Argyle	Grimsby Town	Loan
9 November 2009	Tom Williams	Peterborough United	Queens Park Rangers	Loan
13 November 2009	John Akinde	Bristol City	Wycombe Wanderers	Loan
13 November 2009	John Bostock	Tottenham Hotspur	Brentford	Loan
13 November 2009	Kieran Djilali	Crystal Palace	Chesterfield	Loan
13 November 2009	Andy Haworth	Blackburn Rovers	Gateshead	Loan
13 November 2009	Ben Marshall	Stoke City	Cheltenham Town	Loan
13 November 2009	Nana Ofori-Twumasi	Chelsea	Dagenham & Redbridge	Loan
14 November 2009	Akpo Sodje	Sheffield Wednesday	Charlton Athletic	Loan
17 November 2009	Sam Cox	Tottenham Hotspur	Histon	Loan
17 November 2009	Dave Kitson	Stoke City	Middlesbrough	Loan
18 November 2009	Richard Wood	Sheffield Wednesday	Coventry City	Loan
19 November 2009	Michael Coulson	Barnsley	Grimsby Town	Loan
19 November 2009	Nicky Featherstone	Hull City	Grimsby Town	Loan
19 November 2009	Steven Reid	Blackburn Rovers	Queens Park Rangers	Loan
19 November 2009	Michael Tonge	Stoke City	Preston North End	Loan
19 November 2009	Josh Walker	Middlesbrough	Northampton Town	Loan
20 November 2009	Gareth Ainsworth	Queens Park Rangers	Wycombe Wanderers	Loan
20 November 2009	Will Atkinson	Hull City	Rochdale	Loan
20 November 2009	Pim Balkestein	Ipswich Town	Brentford	Loan
20 November 2009	David Button	Tottenham Hotspur	Shrewsbury Town	Loan
20 November 2009	Kieron Cadogan	Crystal Palace	Burton Albion	Loan
20 November 2009	Joss Labadie	West Bromwich Albion	Cheltenham Town	Loan
20 November 2009	Adam Smith	Tottenham Hotspur	Torquay United	Loan
20 November 2009	Wojciech Szczęsny	Arsenal	Brentford	Loan
20 November 2009	Rhys Taylor	Chelsea	Queens Park Rangers	Loan
21 November 2009	Fabrice Pancrate	Unattached	Newcastle United	Free
23 November 2009	Onome Sodje	Barnsley	Oxford United	Loan
24 November 2009	David Cotterill	Sheffield United	Swansea City	Loan
24 November 2009	Exodus Geohaghon	Kettering Town	Peterborough United	Loan
24 November 2009	Scott Malone	Wolverhampton Wanderers	Southend United	Loan
24 November 2009	Rhys Murphy	Arsenal	Brentford	Loan
24 November 2009	Nigel Quashie	West Ham United	Milton Keynes Dons	Loan
24 November 2009	Nicky Shorey	Aston Villa	Nottingham Forest	Loan
24 November 2009	Sean Rigg	Bristol Rovers	Port Vale	Loan
25 November 2009	Marlon Jackson	Bristol City	Aldershot Town	Loan
25 November 2009	Russell Martin	Peterborough United	Norwich City	Loan
26 November 2009	Barry Bannan	Aston Villa	Blackpool	Loan
26 November 2009	Dean Bouzanis	Liverpool	Accrington Stanley	Loan
26 November 2009	Oliver Bozanic	Reading	Aldershot Town	Loan
26 November 2009	Calum Butcher	Tottenham Hotspur	Brentford	Loan
26 November 2009	Ashley Cain	Coventry City	Luton Town	Loan
26 November 2009	Tony Capaldi	Cardiff City	Leeds United	Loan
26 November 2009	Ashley Eastham	Blackpool	Cheltenham Town	Loan
26 November 2009	DJ Campbell	Leicester City	Derby County	Loan
26 November 2009	Jamie Day	Peterborough United	Dagenham & Redbridge	Loan
26 November 2009	Hogan Ephraim	Queens Park Rangers	Leeds United	Loan
26 November 2009	Warren Feeney	Cardiff City	Sheffield Wednesday	Loan
26 November 2009	Johnny Flynn	Blackburn Rovers	Accrington Stanley	Loan
26 November 2009	Paul Heffernan	Doncaster Rovers	Oldham Athletic	Loan
26 November 2009	Chris Herd	Aston Villa	Lincoln City	Loan
26 November 2009	Carl Ikeme	Wolverhampton Wanderers	Sheffield United	Loan
26 November 2009	Stern John	Crystal Palace	Ipswich Town	Loan
26 November 2009	Toni Kallio	Fulham	Sheffield United	Loan
26 November 2009	Kevin Long	Cork City	Burnley	Undisclosed
26 November 2009	David Martin	Liverpool	Leeds United	Loan
26 November 2009	Ian Morris	Scunthorpe United	Chesterfield	Loan
26 November 2009	Jordan Mutch	Birmingham City	Hereford United	Loan
26 November 2009	Tom Soares	Stoke City	Sheffield Wednesday	Loan
26 November 2009	Nathaniel Wedderburn	Stoke City	Hereford United	Loan
26 November 2009	Ben Wright	Peterborough United	Grimsby Town	Loan
11 December 2009	Marek Štěch	West Ham United	Bournemouth	Loan
17 December 2009	Simon Locke	Reading	Gillingham	Loan
18 December 2009	Landon Donovan	Major League Soccer (Los Angeles Galaxy)	Everton	Loan
23 December 2009	Aaron Morris	Cardiff City	Newport County	Loan
29 December 2009	Clayton McDonald	Manchester City	Walsall	Free
30 December 2009	Marcel Seip	Plymouth Argyle	Sheffield United	Loan
31 December 2009	Joe Anderson	Fulham	Lincoln City	Undisclosed
31 December 2009	Eddie Johnson	Fulham	Aris Thessaloniki	Loan
31 December 2009	Matthew Saunders	Fulham	Lincoln City	Loan
31 December 2009	Gabriel Tamaş	Auxerre	West Bromwich Albion	Loan
31 December 2009	Gunnar Heiðar Þorvaldsson	Esbjerg	Reading	Loan
31 December 2009	Michael Uwezu	Fulham	Lincoln City	Loan
31 December 2009	Adam Watts	Fulham	Lincoln City	Undisclosed
1 January 2010	Lee Johnson	Bristol City	Derby County	Loan
1 January 2010	Chris Hussey	AFC Wimbledon	Coventry City	Undisclosed
1 January 2010	Kayode Odejayi	Barnsley	Colchester United	Undisclosed
1 January 2010	John-Joe O'Toole	Watford	Colchester United	Undisclosed
1 January 2010	Krisztián Timár	Plymouth Argyle	Oldham Athletic	Loan
1 January 2010	Darren Ward	Wolverhampton Wanderers	Millwall	Free
1 January 2010	Richard Wood	Sheffield Wednesday	Coventry City	Undisclosed
2 January 2010	Paris Cowan-Hall	Portsmouth	Grimsby Town	Loan
2 January 2010	Paul Marshall	Manchester City	Aberdeen	Undisclosed
4 January 2010	Gary Deegan	Bohemians	Coventry City	Undisclosed
4 January 2010	Russell Martin	Peterborough United	Norwich City	Undisclosed
4 January 2010	Liam Trotter	Ipswich Town	Millwall	Loan
5 January 2010	Richard Cresswell	Stoke City	Sheffield United	Undisclosed
5 January 2010	Neill Collins	Wolverhampton Wanderers	Preston North End	Undisclosed
5 January 2010	Josh Simpson	Histon	Peterborough United	Undisclosed
5 January 2010	Luke Wilkinson	Portsmouth	Northampton Town	Loan
6 January 2010	Carl Ikeme	Wolverhampton Wanderers	Queens Park Rangers	Loan
6 January 2010	Reuben Reid	West Bromwich Albion	Peterborough United	Loan
6 January 2010	Tom Taiwo	Chelsea	Carlisle United	Undisclosed
7 January 2010	Andy Butler	Huddersfield Town	Blackpool	Loan
7 January 2010	David Cotterill	Sheffield United	Swansea City	£600k
7 January 2010	Nicky Hunt	Bolton Wanderers	Derby County	Loan
7 January 2010	Marlon Pack	Portsmouth	Dagenham & Redbridge	Loan
7 January 2010	Tommy Smith	Ipswich Town	Brentford	Loan
7 January 2010	Vladimir Stojković	Sporting CP	Wigan Athletic	Loan
8 January 2010	Carl Baker	Stockport County	Coventry City	Undisclosed
8 January 2010	Didier Digard	Middlesbrough	Nice	Loan
8 January 2010	Andrea Dossena	Liverpool	Napoli	Undisclosed
8 January 2010	Olivier Kapo	Wigan Athletic	Boulogne	Loan
8 January 2010	Jake Livermore	Tottenham Hotspur	Peterborough United	Loan
8 January 2010	Patrick Vieira	Internazionale	Manchester City	Undisclosed
8 January 2010	David Worrall	West Bromwich Albion	Bury	Free
9 January 2010	José Fonte	Crystal Palace	Southampton	Undisclosed
10 January 2010	Andriy Voronin	Liverpool	Dynamo Moscow	£1.8m
11 January 2010	Nicky Featherstone	Hull City	Grimsby Town	Loan
11 January 2010	Elrio van Heerden	Blackburn Rovers	Sivasspor	Free
11 January 2010	Izale McLeod	Charlton Athletic	Peterborough United	Loan
11 January 2010	Míchel	Sporting Gijón	Birmingham City	£3m
12 January 2010	Danny Andrew	Peterborough United	Cheltenham Town	Loan
12 January 2010	Steven Gohouri	Unattached	Wigan Athletic	Free
12 January 2010	Andy Griffin	Stoke City	Reading	Loan
13 January 2010	Gary Caldwell	Celtic	Wigan Athletic	Undisclosed
13 January 2010	Nathan Doyle	Hull City	Barnsley	Free
13 January 2010	Willo Flood	Celtic	Middlesbrough	Free
13 January 2010	Colin Healy	Ipswich Town	Falkirk	Loan
13 January 2010	Chris Killen	Celtic	Middlesbrough	Free
13 January 2010	Marcos Painter	Swansea City	Brighton & Hove Albion	Loan
13 January 2010	Barry Robson	Celtic	Middlesbrough	Undisclosed
13 January 2010	Maxi Rodríguez	Atlético Madrid	Liverpool	Free
13 January 2010	Mohammed Shawky	Middlesbrough	Kayserispor	Free
14 January 2010	Joss Labadie	West Bromwich Albion	Cheltenham Town	Loan
14 January 2010	Andros Townsend	Tottenham Hotspur	Milton Keynes Dons	Loan
15 January 2010	Russell Anderson	Sunderland	Derby County	Free
15 January 2010	Ashley Eastham	Blackpool	Cheltenham Town	Loan
15 January 2010	Samuel Galindo	América	Arsenal	Undsiclosed
15 January 2010	Stephen McGinn	St Mirren	Watford	Undisclosed
15 January 2010	Mark Randall	Arsenal	Milton Keynes Dons	Loan
16 January 2010	Sol Campbell	Unattached	Arsenal	Free
18 January 2010	Adam Clayton	Manchester City	Carlisle United	Loan
18 January 2010	Lucas Neill	Everton	Galatasaray	£750k
18 January 2010	O'Neil Thompson	Barnsley	Burton Albion	Loan
18 January 2010	Amr Zaki	Zamalek	Hull City	Loan
19 January 2010	Kwesi Appiah	Peterborough United	Kettering Town	Loan
19 January 2010	Jamal Campbell-Ryce	Barnsley	Bristol City	Undisclosed
19 January 2010	Sam Cox	Tottenham Hotspur	Torquay United	Loan
19 January 2010	Krystian Pearce	Birmingham City	Huddersfield Town	Loan
19 January 2010	Mark Yeates	Middlesbrough	Sheffield United	Undisclosed
20 January 2010	Kerrea Gilbert	Arsenal	Peterborough United	Loan
20 January 2010	Rene Howe	Peterborough United	Gillingham	Loan
20 January 2010	Danny Simpson	Manchester United	Newcastle United	Undisclosed
21 January 2010	Frankie Artus	Bristol City	Chesterfield	Loan
21 January 2010	Darren Dennehy	Cardiff City	Gillingham	Loan
21 January 2010	Toumani Diagouraga	Peterborough United	Brentford	Loan
21 January 2010	Andrew Howarth	Blackburn Rovers	Rochdale	Loan
21 January 2010	Jô	Manchester City	Galatasaray	Loan
21 January 2010	Matthew Kilgallon	Sheffield United	Sunderland	Undisclosed
21 January 2010	Geoffrey Mujangi Bia	RSC Charleroi	Wolverhampton Wanderers	Loan
21 January 2010	Tristan Plummer	Bristol City	Gillingham	Loan
21 January 2010	Matt Thornhill	Nottingham Forest	Cheltenham Town	Loan
21 January 2010	Luke Varney	Derby County	Sheffield Wednesday	Loan
22 January 2010	Ross Atkins	Derby County	Burton Albion	Loan
22 January 2010	Ryan Bennett	Grimsby Town	Peterborough United	Undisclosed
22 January 2010	Exodus Geohaghon	Kettering Town	Peterborough United	Undisclosed
22 January 2010	Scott Griffiths	Dagenham & Redbridge	Peterborough United	Undisclosed
22 January 2010	Frédéric Nimani	AS Monaco	Burnley	Loan
22 January 2010	Tom Parkes	Leicester City	Burton Albion	Loan
22 January 2010	Josh Payne	West Ham United	Wycombe Wanderers	Loan
22 January 2010	Nigel Quashie	West Ham United	Queens Park Rangers	Free
22 January 2010	Christian Ribeiro	Bristol City	Colchester United	Loan
22 January 2010	Daniël de Ridder	Wigan Athletic	Hapoel Tel Aviv	Loan
22 January 2010	Nolberto Solano	Unattached	Leicester City	Free
22 January 2010	David Stockdale	Fulham	Plymouth Argyle	Loan
22 January 2010	Neal Trotman	Preston North End	Huddersfield Town	Loan
22 January 2010	Gavin Gunning	Blackburn Rovers	Rotherham United	Loan
23 January 2010	Marcus Marshall	Blackburn Rovers	Rotherham United	Loan
25 January 2010	Patrick Agyemang	Queens Park Rangers	Bristol City	Loan
25 January 2010	Shaun Batt	Peterborough United	Millwall	Loan
25 January 2010	Steve Collis	Unattached	Bristol City	Free
25 January 2010	Paul Downing	West Bromwich Albion	Hereford United	Loan
25 January 2010	Lateef Elford-Alliyu	West Bromwich Albion	Hereford United	Loan
25 January 2010	Max Gradel	Leicester City	Leeds United	Undisclosed
25 January 2010	Adlene Guedioura	RSC Charleroi	Wolverhampton Wanderers	Loan
25 January 2010	Stephen Henderson	Bristol City	Wycombe Wanderers	Loan
25 January 2010	Matt Hill	Wolverhampton Wanderers	Queens Park Rangers	Loan
25 January 2010	Zurab Khizanishvili	Blackburn Rovers	Reading	Loan
25 January 2010	Jordan Mutch	Birmingham City	Doncaster Rovers	Loan
25 January 2010	Philippe Senderos	Arsenal	Everton	Loan
25 January 2010	Vladimír Weiss	Manchester City	Bolton Wanderers	Loan
25 January 2010	Danny Welbeck	Manchester United	Preston North End	Loan
26 January 2010	Will Buckley	Rochdale	Watford	Undisclosed
26 January 2010	Craig Gardner	Aston Villa	Birmingham City	£3m
26 January 2010	Stuart Holden	Major League Soccer (Houston Dynamo)	Bolton Wanderers	Free
26 January 2010	Shefki Kuqi	TuS Koblenz	Swansea City	Free
26 January 2010	Donal McDermott	Manchester City	Scunthorpe United	Loan
26 January 2010	Shane Redmond	Nottingham Forest	Darlington	Loan
26 January 2010	Wayne Routledge	Queens Park Rangers	Newcastle United	Undisclosed
27 January 2010	Yıldıray Baştürk	Unattached	Blackburn Rovers	Free
27 January 2010	Leon Cort	Stoke City	Burnley	£1.5m
27 January 2010	Lewis Haldane	Bristol Rovers	Port Vale	Free
27 January 2010	Brendan Moloney	Nottingham Forest	Scunthorpe United	Loan
27 January 2010	Quincy Owusu-Abeyie	Spartak Moscow	Portsmouth	Loan
27 January 2010	Giovani dos Santos	Tottenham Hotspur	Galatasaray	Loan
27 January 2010	Zoran Tošić	Manchester United	Köln	Loan
27 January 2010	Nicky Weaver	Dundee United	Burnley	Free
27 January 2010	Mike Williamson	Portsmouth	Newcastle United	Undisclosed
28 January 2010	Nathan Eccleston	Liverpool	Huddersfield Town	Loan
28 January 2010	Amine Linganzi	AS Saint-Étienne	Blackburn Rovers	Loan
28 January 2010	Robinho	Manchester City	Santos	Loan
29 January 2010	George Donnelly	Plymouth Argyle	Stockport County	Loan
29 January 2010	Brian Easton	Burnley	Hamilton Academical	Loan
29 January 2010	Danny Fox	Celtic	Burnley	Undisclosed
29 January 2010	Fitz Hall	Queens Park Rangers	Newcastle United	Loan
29 January 2010	Eiður Guðjohnsen	AS Monaco	Tottenham Hotspur	Loan
29 January 2010	Gary McSheffrey	Birmingham City	Leeds United	Loan
29 January 2010	Greg Mills	Derby County	Macclesfield Town	Loan
29 January 2010	Stephen McManus	Celtic	Middlesbrough	Loan
29 January 2010	Jamie O'Hara	Tottenham Hotspur	Portsmouth	Loan
29 January 2010	Kyel Reid	Sheffield United	Charlton Athletic	Loan
29 January 2010	Paul Robinson	West Bromwich Albion	Bolton Wanderers	Undisclosed
29 January 2010	Martin Taylor	Birmingham City	Watford	Free
29 January 2010	Patrick van Aanholt	Chelsea	Newcastle United	Loan
29 January 2010	Jack Wilshere	Arsenal	Bolton Wanderers	Loan
30 January 2010	Frank Fielding	Blackburn Rovers	Rochdale	Loan
30 January 2010	Younes Kaboul	Portsmouth	Tottenham Hotspur	£5m
30 January 2010	Tope Obadeyi	Bolton Wanderers	Rochdale	Loan
30 January 2010	Victor Moses	Crystal Palace	Wigan Athletic	£2.5m
30 January 2010	Jason Puncheon	Plymouth Argyle	Southampton	Undisclosed
31 January 2010	Stefano Okaka Chuka	Roma	Fulham	Loan
31 January 2010	Geremi	Newcastle United	Ankaragücü	Undisclosed
1 February 2010	Ilan Araujo Dall'Igna	Saint-Etienne	West Ham United	Undisclosed
1 February 2010	Troy Archibald-Henville	Tottenham Hotspur	Exeter City	Undisclosed
1 February 2010	Asmir Begović	Portsmouth	Stoke City	£4m
1 February 2010	Benjani	Manchester City	Sunderland	Loan
1 February 2010	Marcus Bent	Birmingham	Queens Park Rangers	Loan
1 February 2010	Leon Best	Coventry City	Newcastle United	Undisclosed
1 February 2010	Wayne Brown	Fulham	Bristol Rovers	Loan
1 February 2010	Alex Bruce	Ipswich Town	Leicester City	Loan
1 February 2010	Christopher Buchtmann	Liverpool	Fulham	Undisclosed
1 February 2010	DJ Campbell	Leicester City	Blackpool	Loan
1 February 2010	Jack Cork	Chelsea	Burnley	Loan
1 February 2010	Paul Coutts	Peterborough United	Preston North End	Undisclosed
1 February 2010	Stephen Dobbie	Swansea City	Blackpool	Loan
1 February 2010	David Healy	Sunderland	Ipswich Town	Loan
1 February 2010	Alan Hutton	Tottenham Hotspur	Sunderland	Loan
1 February 2010	Adam Johnson	Middlesbrough	Manchester City	£7m
1 February 2010	Toni Kallio	Fulham	Sheffield United	Loan
1 February 2010	Diomansy Kamara	Fulham	Celtic	Loan
1 February 2010	Robbie Keane	Tottenham Hotspur	Celtic	Loan
1 February 2010	Ben Marshall	Stoke City	Carlisle United	Loan
1 February 2010	Benni McCarthy	Blackburn Rovers	West Ham United	Undisclosed
1 February 2010	Mido	Middlesbrough	West Ham United	Loan
1 February 2010	Marcelo Moreno	Shakhtar Donetsk	Wigan Athletic	Loan
1 February 2010	Daryl Murphy	Sunderland	Ipswich Town	Loan
1 February 2010	Kyle Naughton	Tottenham Hotspur	Middlesbrough	Loan
1 February 2010	David Nugent	Portsmouth	Burnley	Loan
1 February 2010	Jay Rodriguez	Burnley	Barnsley	Loan
1 February 2010	Nicky Shorey	Aston Villa	Fulham	Loan
1 February 2010	Michael Tonge	Stoke City	Derby County	Loan
1 February 2010	Javan Vidal	Manchester City	Derby County	Loan

- ^1 Player will officially join his new club on 1 January 2010.

== Notes and references ==
General

- "Transfers – September 2009". BBC Sport. 30 September 2009.
- "Transfers – October 2009". BBC Sport. 31 October 2009.
- "Transfers – November 2009". BBC Sport. 26 November 2009.
- "Transfers – December 2009". BBC Sport. 31 December 2009.
- "Transfers – January 2010". BBC Sport. 31 January 2010.
- "Transfers – February 2010". BBC Sport. 4 February 2010.

Specific
