= Ryan Connolly =

Irish footballer (born 1992)

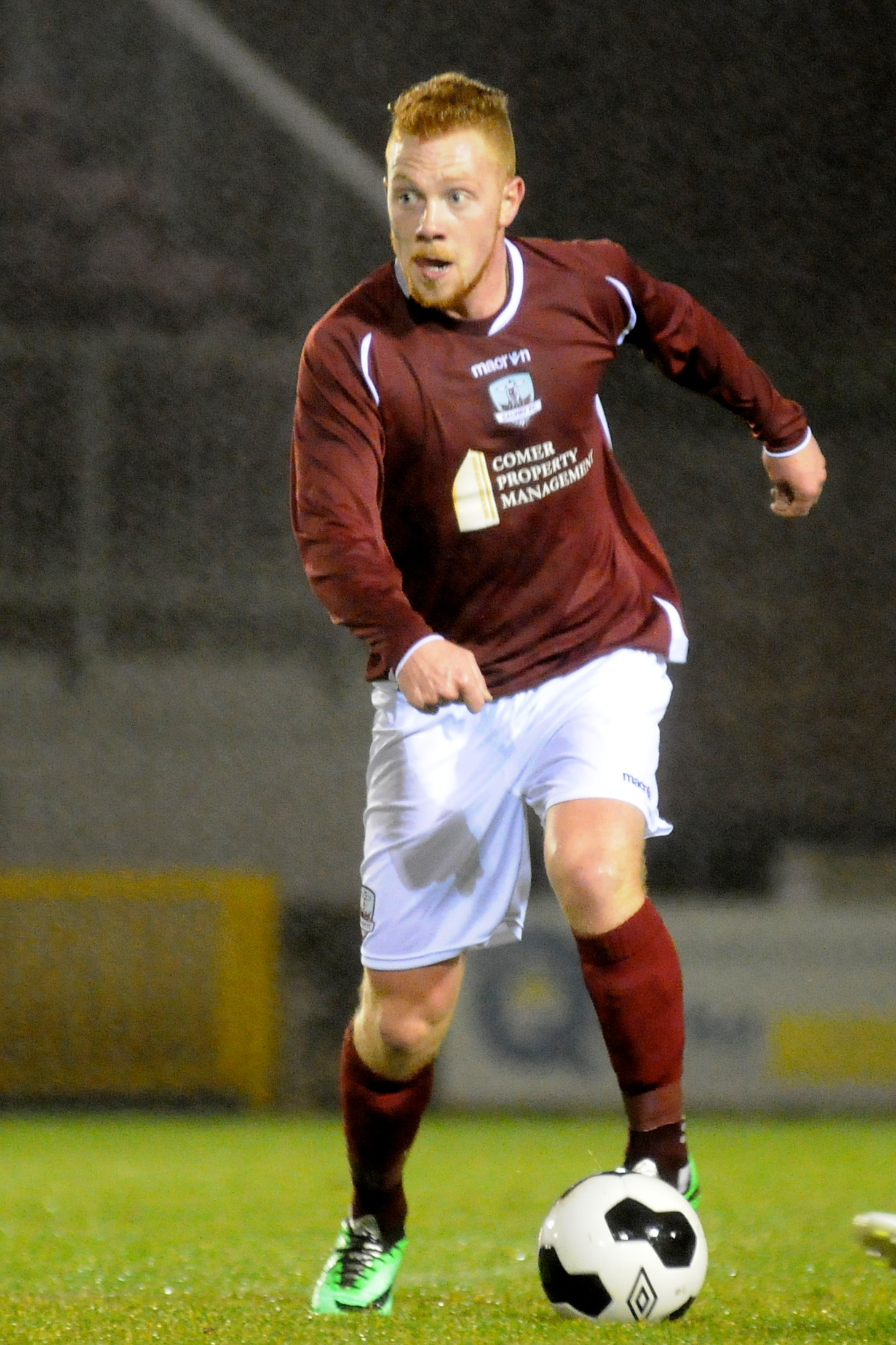
- Ryan Connolly in action for Galway United

Personal information
- Full name: Ryan Michael Connolly
- Date of birth: 13 January 1992 (age 34)
- Place of birth: Castlebar, Ireland
- Height: 1.78 m (5 ft 10 in)
- Position: Midfielder

Youth career
- 2008–2010: Derby County

Senior career*
Years	Team	Apps	(Gls)
2010–2012	Derby County	1	(0)
2011	→ Ayr United (loan)	9	(0)
2012–2013	Sligo Rovers	17	(0)
2013	→ Longford Town (loan)	11	(2)
2014–2016	Galway United	83	(12)
2017	Shamrock Rovers	20	(0)
2018	Galway United	26	(1)
2019	Ballyglass		
2020–2022	Finn Harps	62	(5)
2023	Treaty United	0	(0)

International career
2009	Republic of Ireland U17		
- * Club domestic league appearances and goals as of 16 December 2022

Ryan Michael Connolly (born 13 January 1992) is an Irish professional footballer who last played for Treaty United in the League of Ireland First Division. Connolly previously played for Football League Championship side Derby County. He plays in midfield and has represented the Republic of Ireland at U-16 level.

== Club career ==
=== Derby County ===
Connolly began his career as a scholar in the Derby County Academy, and had his first experience of first team football came when he was named as a substitute for Derby County's FA Cup 5th Round tie at home to Birmingham City in February 2010 before making his full debut as a late substitute in Derby's 2–0 victory over Cardiff City on the final day of the 2009–10 season. Although primarily involved with the youth team – scoring twice in a 6–1 win over Peterborough United in the FA Youth Cup -Connolly also appeared for the Derby County Reserves side which won the 2009–10 Central League Central Section title, starting three of his nine appearances and scoring the winner in a 1–0 win over Sheffield Wednesday. He was named as Derby's Scholar of the Year for the 2009/10 season and signed his first professional deal with the club on 8 July 2010.

Connolly's career suffered a setback when he suffered a cruciate ligament injury during an Under 18's friendly in August 2010, which ruled him out for six months. Despite this setback he was given a new one-year contract extension, alongside compariate Jeff Hendrick, in January 2011 to take him through until Summer 2012. He returned to competitive action on 3 May 2011 when he appeared as a second-half substitute in Derby County reserves 4–0 victory at Sheffield United, which clinched the club's second consecutive totesport Central League title.

=== Ayr United ===
On 31 August 2011, Connolly joined Scottish First Division side Ayr United on loan until 31 December 2011. Connolly spent the majority of his time at Ayr on the substitutes bench as he featured 12 times for The Honest Men. Connolly was named on the Derby County substitute bench in a 2–0 defeat at Brighton & Hove Albion on 20 March 2012, being allocated squad number 34.

=== Sligo Rovers ===
Connolly signed for Sligo Rovers in June 2012.

=== Galway United ===
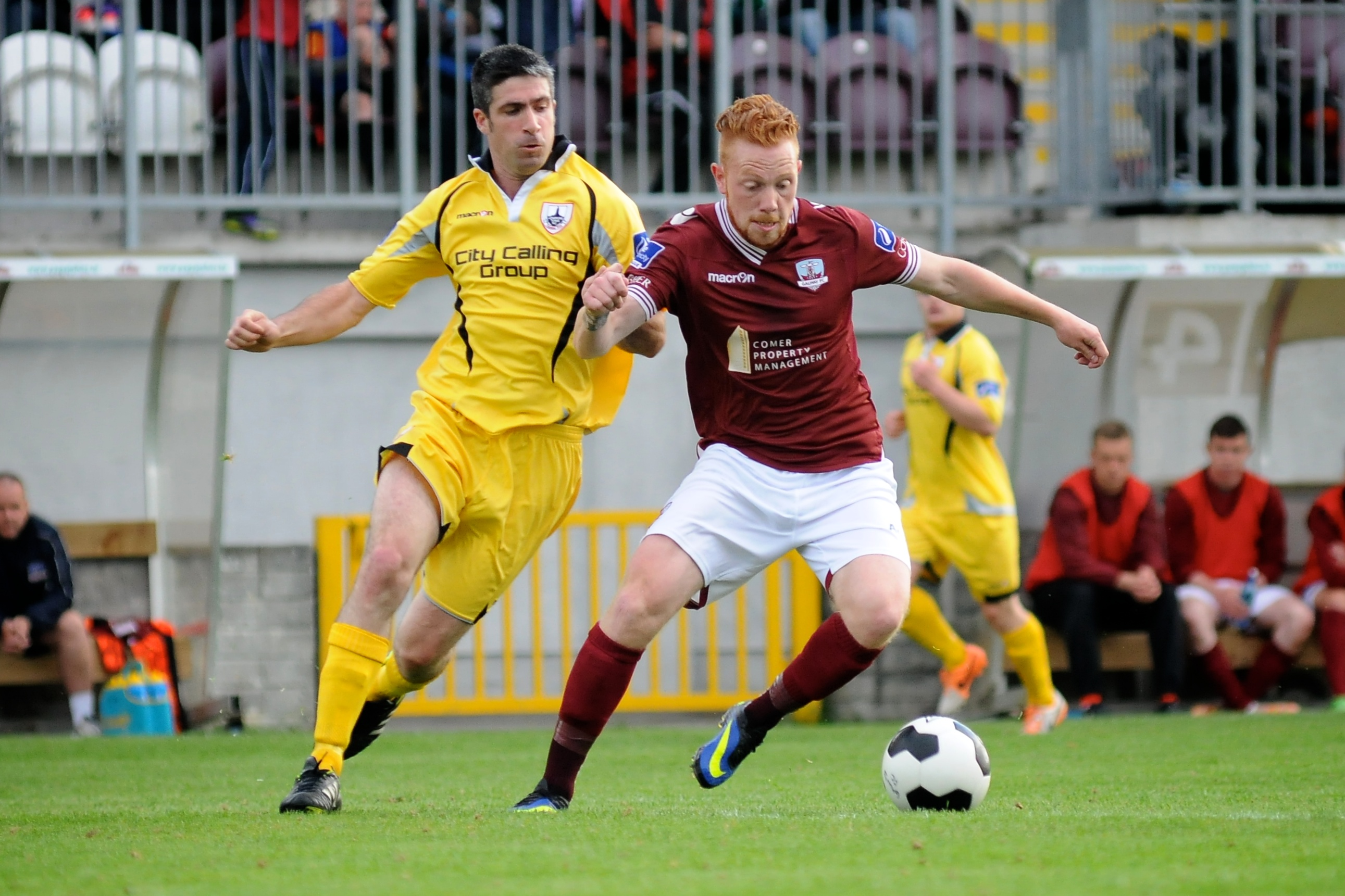
Connolly (right) playing for Galway FC against Kevin O'Connor (left) in 2014

On 9 January 2014, it was announced that Ryan had signed for Galway United ahead of the 2014 season.

=== Shamrock Rovers ===
Connolly spent the 2017 season with Shamrock Rovers making four appearances in the 2017–18 UEFA Europa League.

=== Galway United ===
Connolly re-signed with Galway United in December 2017 ahead of their 2018 season back in the First Division. He made his League debut for The Tribesmen in their 4–1 win over Athlone Town on Friday, 23 February.

=== Finn Harps ===
In December 2019, Connolly was announced as having joined Finn Harps for the 2020 League of Ireland Premier Division season. On 14 January 2020 it was announced that Ryan would be sponsored by Social Media Manager Ireland. He scored the winning goal in the opening round of the 2020 FAI Cup against St. Patrick's Athletic.

=== Treaty United ===
League of Ireland First Division side Treaty United announced that they had signed Connolly for the 2023 season on 15 December 2022 after three years with Finn Harps. On 14 February 2023, it was then announced that he had left the club before the start of the season, due to work commitments.

== International career ==
He has represented the Republic of Ireland at Under 15, 16 and Under 17 level. He was called up to the Republic of Ireland Under 19 for the first time, alongside fellow Derby County player Jeff Hendrick, on 29 July 2010.

== Honours ==
Sligo Rovers

- League of Ireland Premier Division (1): 2012
