= Derbyshire FA Centenary Cup =

- Organiser(s): Derbyshire Football Association
- Founded: 1983; 43 years ago
- Abolished: 2009; 17 years ago
- Region: Derbyshire
- Teams: 2 Derby County; Chesterfield; Alfreton Town (2003-04)
- Last champions: Chesterfield (4th title)
- Most championships: Derby County (18 titles)

The Derbyshire FA Centenary Cup was an annual friendly association football competition, primarily played between Derbyshire's two professional clubs, Derby County and Chesterfield. It was contested from 1983 until 2004, with a one-off return in 2009.

== Background and history ==
The Derbyshire FA Centenary Cup was founded in 1983 to celebrate the centenary of the Derbyshire Football Association and was contested in the form of a friendly. The first ever tie was a two-legged affair between Derbyshire's two Football League clubs, Derby County and Chesterfield, to earn the 'County Title'. Both matches were played mid-season, in November. The first leg, at Chesterfield's Saltergate, ended 5–2 to Derby and the return leg at the Baseball Ground finished in a 1–1 draw for a 6–3 aggregate win for Derby.

After this, matches became single-legged. For the next two seasons, they were played at the beginning of the following season to fit in with to Derby County's touring schedules (so the 1984–85 match was actually played at the beginning of the 1985–86 season and the 1985–86 match was actually played at the beginning of the 1986–87 season), before becoming standard pre-season matches. This meant that two matches were played within six days of each other in 1986: one on 9 August for the 1985–86 season and one on 15 August for the 1986–87 season. The 1996–97 match broke the established timetable and was held in November.

Originally, the venue alternated between Chesterfield's Saltergate and Derby's Baseball Ground (Pride Park Stadium in 1998), but the match was held solely at Chesterfield from 1999.

After several years of sending their reserve team to fulfil the fixture, Derby County declined to enter the 2003 competition and were replaced by non-league Alfreton Town, who beat Chesterfield 2–0 at their North Street stadium. Derby County returned for next year's contest but then pulled out again. This time the match was cancelled altogether for four years. It returned for the 2009–10 season, but has not been played since.

== Rules ==
Matches followed typical friendly competition rules. Extra time was used for draws in the earlier years of the competition, but later ties went straight to penalty shoot-outs.

== Winners ==
=== Total wins ===
Club	Wins	Years won
Derby County	18	1983–84, 1984–85, 1985–86, 1986–87, 1987–88, 1988–89, 1989–90, 1990–91, 1991–92, 1992–93, 1993–94, 199–96, 1996–97, 1997–98, 1998–99, 1999–2000, 2002–03, 2004–05
Chesterfield	4	1994–95, 2000–01, 2001–02, 2009–10
Alfreton Town	1	2003–04

=== Results ===
Data from Chesterfield FC.

7 November 1983 1983–84 1st Leg	Chesterfield	2–5	Derby County	Chesterfield
				Stadium: Saltergate; Attendance: 2,853

28 November 1983 1983–84 2nd Leg	Derby County	1–1 (6–3 agg.)	Chesterfield	Derby
				Stadium: Baseball Ground; Attendance: 1,814

3 August 1985 1984–85	Derby County	3–2 (a.e.t.)	Chesterfield	Derby
				Stadium: Baseball Ground; Attendance: 2,296

9 August 1986 1985–86	Chesterfield	1–5	Derby County	Chesterfield
15:00 BST				Stadium: Saltergate; Attendance: 1,908

15 August 1986 1986–87	Derby County	1–0 (a.e.t.)	Chesterfield	Derby
				Stadium: Baseball Ground; Attendance: 1,954

1 August 1987 1987–88	Chesterfield	0–2	Derby County	Chesterfield
15:00 BST				Stadium: Saltergate; Attendance: 1,944

19 August 1988 1988–89	Derby County	2–1	Chesterfield	Derby
				Stadium: Baseball Ground; Attendance: 2,031

10 August 1989 1989–90	Chesterfield	0–2	Derby County	Chesterfield
				Stadium: Saltergate; Attendance: 1,787

14 August 1990 1990–91	Derby County	2–1	Chesterfield	Derby
				Stadium: Baseball Ground; Attendance: 2,702

5 August 1991 1991–92	Chesterfield	1–2	Derby County	Chesterfield
				Stadium: Saltergate; Attendance: 2,369

1 August 1992 1992–93	Derby County	4–1	Chesterfield	Derby
				Stadium: Baseball Ground; Attendance: 4,112

31 July 1993 1993–94	Chesterfield	2–7	Derby County	Chesterfield
15:00 BST				Stadium: Saltergate; Attendance: 3,091

6 August 1994 1994–95	Derby County	0–1	Chesterfield	Derby
				Stadium: Baseball Ground; Attendance: 2,435

29 July 1995 1995–96	Chesterfield	1–3	Derby County	Chesterfield
15:00 BST				Stadium: Saltergate; Attendance: 3,030

11 November 1996 1996–97	Derby County	3–1	Chesterfield	Derby
19:45 GMT				Stadium: Baseball Ground; Attendance: 2,746

1 August 1997 1997–98	Chesterfield	1–3	Derby County	Chesterfield
19:30 BST				Stadium: Saltergate; Attendance: 2,812

3 August 1998 1998–99	Derby County	1–1 (4–2 p)	Chesterfield	Derby
19:45 BST				Stadium: Pride Park Stadium; Attendance: 3,289

31 July 1999 1999–2000	Chesterfield	0–1	Derby County	Chesterfield
15:00 BST				Stadium: Saltergate; Attendance: 1,503

22 July 2000 2000–01	Chesterfield	1–1 (4–3 p)	Derby County	Chesterfield
				Stadium: Saltergate; Attendance: 2,963

3 August 2001 2001–02	Chesterfield	3–0	Derby County	Chesterfield
				Stadium: Saltergate; Attendance: 1,369

30 July 2002 2002–03	Chesterfield	0–3	Derby County	Chesterfield
19:45 BST				Stadium: Saltergate; Attendance: 1,557

25 July 2003 2003–04	Alfreton Town	2–0	Chesterfield	Alfreton
19:30 BST				Stadium: North Street; Attendance: 911

24 July 2004 2004–05	Chesterfield	1–5	Derby County	Chesterfield
15:00 BST				Stadium: Saltergate; Attendance: 3,114

18 July 2009 2009–10	Chesterfield	2–1	Derby County	Chesterfield
15:00 BST				Stadium: Saltergate; Attendance: 3,716
