= Greg Mills (footballer) =

English footballer (born 1990)

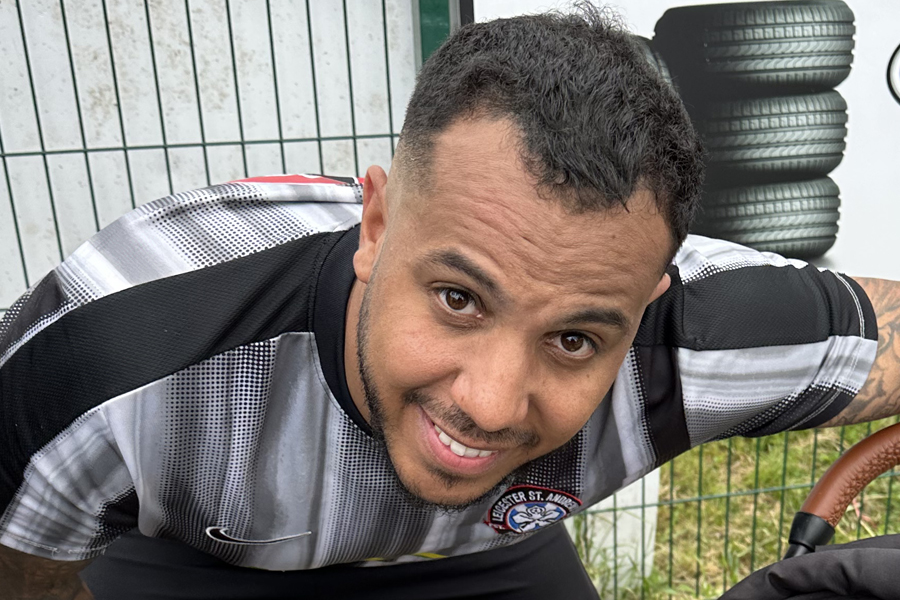
- Mills in May 2025

Personal information
- Full name: Gregory Adam Mills
- Date of birth: 18 September 1990 (age 36)
- Place of birth: Leicester, England
- Height: 5 ft 9 in (1.75 m)
- Position: Winger

Team information
- Current team: Leicester St Andrews

Youth career
- Derby County

Senior career*
Years	Team	Apps	(Gls)
2009–2011	Derby County	2	(0)
2009	→ Solihull Moors (loan)	2	(2)
2009–2010	→ Solihull Moors (loan)	4	(1)
2010	→ Macclesfield Town (loan)	1	(0)
2010–2011	→ AFC Telford United (loan)	36	(8)
2011–2012	AFC Telford United	16	(2)
2012–2013	Worcester City	46	(5)
2013	Boston United	6	(1)
2013–2014	Barrow	8	(0)
2013	→ King's Lynn Town (loan)	5	(1)
2013	→ Corby Town (loan)	7	(2)
2014–2016	Corby Town	106	(44)
2016–2017	Tamworth	23	(3)
2017	Nuneaton Town	23	(5)
2017–2018	Darlington	15	(1)
2018–2019	Stourbridge	48	(24)
2019–2020	Bromsgrove Sporting	23	(8)
2020–2023	Stourbridge	9	(3)
2023	Halesowen Town	0	(0)
2023–2024	Melton Town		
2024	Corby Town	10	(2)
2024	Racing Club Warwick	0	(0)
2024–	Leicester St Andrews		
- * Club domestic league appearances and goals as of 13:00, 3 May 2025 (UTC)

Gregory Adam Mills (born 18 September 1990) is an English footballer who plays as a winger for Leicester St Andrews. He previously played in the Football League for Derby County and Macclesfield Town and in non-league football for at least a dozen clubs.

== Playing career ==
Mills was born in Leicester, Leicestershire. He progressed through the ranks at Derby County and was a regular member of the reserve team in the 2009–10 pre-season. After playing in a 4–0 win away to Shrewsbury Town's reserves in the Central League Division One Central Section in August 2009, Mills moved to Conference North club Solihull Moors on loan for a month. He scored four goals in four matches, and the loan was extended for a second month, but was cut short due to an injury crisis at Derby, and he was named amongst the substitutes for the first team's visit to Leicester City in the Championship on 18 October 2009. He remained unused on that occasion, but did make his debut three days later, as a 79th-minute replacement for Gary Teale in a 2–0 defeat away to Middlesbrough. He returned to Solihull for six weeks on 19 November, and on 29 January 2010 joined Macclesfield Town of League Two on a month's loan. He made only one appearance for the club, as a substitute in a 2–1 away defeat against Bury.

After impressing in a pre-season fixture for AFC Telford United against Hednesford Town, which Telford won 2–0, Mills joined the Conference North club in August on a month's loan. After hitting three goals in his first six games, the loan was extended until January 2011. He returned to Derby for two weeks before rejoining Telford on 31 January for the remainder of the campaign. Four days after Derby confirmed that Mills would be released at the end of the season, he played for an hour in the Conference North play-off final in the 3–2 victory over Guiseley that brought Telford promotion to the Conference National. On 15 August, Mills rejoined AFC Telford United on a one-year contract. Mills scored on his second debut for Telford and his first Conference National match; entering the game as a 67th-minute substitute, he produced a stoppage-time consolation goal in a 2–1 defeat against Lincoln City. He was released by Telford in January 2012.

Mills signed for Worcester City of the Conference South until the end of the season. He was unable to find a Conference Premier club, so rejoined Worcester for 2012–13. In March 2013 he moved on to Conference North Boston United, and agreed to stay on for 2013–14, but work commitments took him to the Manchester area and he signed for Barrow, also of the Conference North. He made eight appearances for Barrow, then spent a month on loan with King's Lynn Town of the Northern Premier League Premier Division before joining Southern League club Corby Town, initially on loan. After 46 goals from 113 appearances in league competition, and helping his team gain promotion to the National League North as 2014–15 Southern League champions, he left the club following their relegation after one season at that level.

Mills spent the first few months of the 2016–17 season with Tamworth of the National League North before moving on in January 2017 to Nuneaton Town where he was reunited with his former manager at Corby Town, Tommy Wright. After Wright took over as manager of yet another National North club, Darlington, Mills followed him in November 2017. He made 16 appearances in all competitions, and was released at the end of the season.

He signed for Southern League Premier Central club Stourbridge in May 2018, and went on to score freely for them, but after a "difference of opinion" with the manager about his role, he left Stourbridge in October 2019 for divisional rivals Bromsgrove Sporting. He scored ten goals from 27 appearances in all competitions, before returning to Stourbridge in 2020. In January 2023, Mills signed for Halesowen Town.

In March 2023, Mills signed for Melton Town.

In February 2024, Mills joined Corby Town where he remained for the remainder of the 2023–24 season. In June 2024, he joined Racing Club Warwick.

Mills signed for Midland League Division One side Leicester St Andrews on 8 September 2024.

== Career statistics ==
As of end of 2017–18 season

Appearances and goals by club, season and competition
Club	Season	League			FA Cup		League Cup (Note: Includes Football League Cup, Northern Premier League Challenge Cup and Southern League Cup)		Other		Total	
Club	Season	Division	Apps	Goals	Apps	Goals	Apps	Goals	Apps	Goals	Apps	Goals
Derby County	2009–10	Championship	2	0	0	0	—		—		2	0
Derby County	2010–11	Championship	0	0	0	0	0	0	—		0	0
Derby County	Total		2	0	0	0	0	0	—		2	0
Solihull Moors (loan)	2009–10	Conference North	6	3	2	2	—		3 (Note: One appearance in Birmingham Senior Cup, two appearances and one goal in FA Trophy)	1	11	6
Macclesfield Town (loan)	2009–10	League Two	1	0	—		—		—		1	0
AFC Telford United (loan)	2010–11	Conference North	36	8	3	1	—		6 (Note: Three appearances in Conference North play-offs, three in FA Trophy)	0	45	9
AFC Telford United	2011–12	Conference Premier	16	2	1	0	—		0	0	17	2
AFC Telford United	Total		52	10	4	1	—		6	0	62	11
Worcester City	2011–12	Conference North	15	2	—		—		0	0	15	2
Worcester City	2012–13	Conference North	31	3	4	0	—		2 (Note: One appearance in FA Trophy, one in Worcestershire Senior Cup)	0	37	3
Worcester City	Total		46	5	4	0	—		2	0	52	5
Boston United	2012–13	Conference North	6	1	—		—		—		6	1
Barrow	2013–14	Conference North	8	0	1	1	—		0	0	9	1
King's Lynn Town	2013–14	Northern Premier League (NPL); Premier Division	5	1	—		1	0	1 (Note: Appearance in Norfolk Senior Cup)	0	7	1
Corby Town	2013–14	Southern League (SFL); Premier Division	30	11	—		—		1 (Note: Appearance in Northamptonshire Senior Cup)	0	31	11
Corby Town	2014–15	SFL Premier Division	43	19	2	0	6	1	3 (Note: One appearance in FA Trophy, two appearances and two goals in Northamptonshire Senior Cup)	2	54	22
Corby Town	2015–16	National League North	40	16	0	0	—		1 (Note: Appearances in FA Trophy)	2	41	18
Corby Town	Total		113	46	2	0	6	1	5	4	126	51
Tamworth	2016–17	National League North	23	3	1	0	—		0	0	24	3
Nuneaton Town	2016–17	National League North	18	5	—		—		1	0	19	5
Nuneaton Town	2017–18	National League North	5	0	2	1	—		—		7	1
Nuneaton Town	Total		23	5	2	1	—		1	0	26	6
Darlington	2017–18	National League North	15	1	—		—		1	0	16	1
Stourbridge	2018–19	SFL Premier Division Central	40	23	2	0	2	1	4 (Note: One appearance in FA Trophy, two in Birmingham Senior Cup, one appearance and one goal in Southern League play-offs)	1	48	25
Stourbridge	2019–20	SFL Premier Division Central	8	1	1	1	1	0	—		10	2
Stourbridge	Total		48	24	3	1	3	1	4	1	58	27
Bromsgrove Sporting	2019–20	SFL Premier Division Central	23	8	—		1	1	3 (Note: One appearance in FA Trophy, two appearances and one goal in Worcestershire Senior Cup)	1	27	10
Stourbridge	2020–21	SFL Premier Division Central	7	3	1	1	0	0	0	0	8	4
Stourbridge	2021–22	SFL Premier Division Central	2	0	0	0	0	0	0	0	2	0
Stourbridge	Total		9	3	1	1	0	0	0	0	10	4
Career total			380	110	20	7	11	3	26	7	437	127
