= Mark Dudley =

English footballer (born 1990)

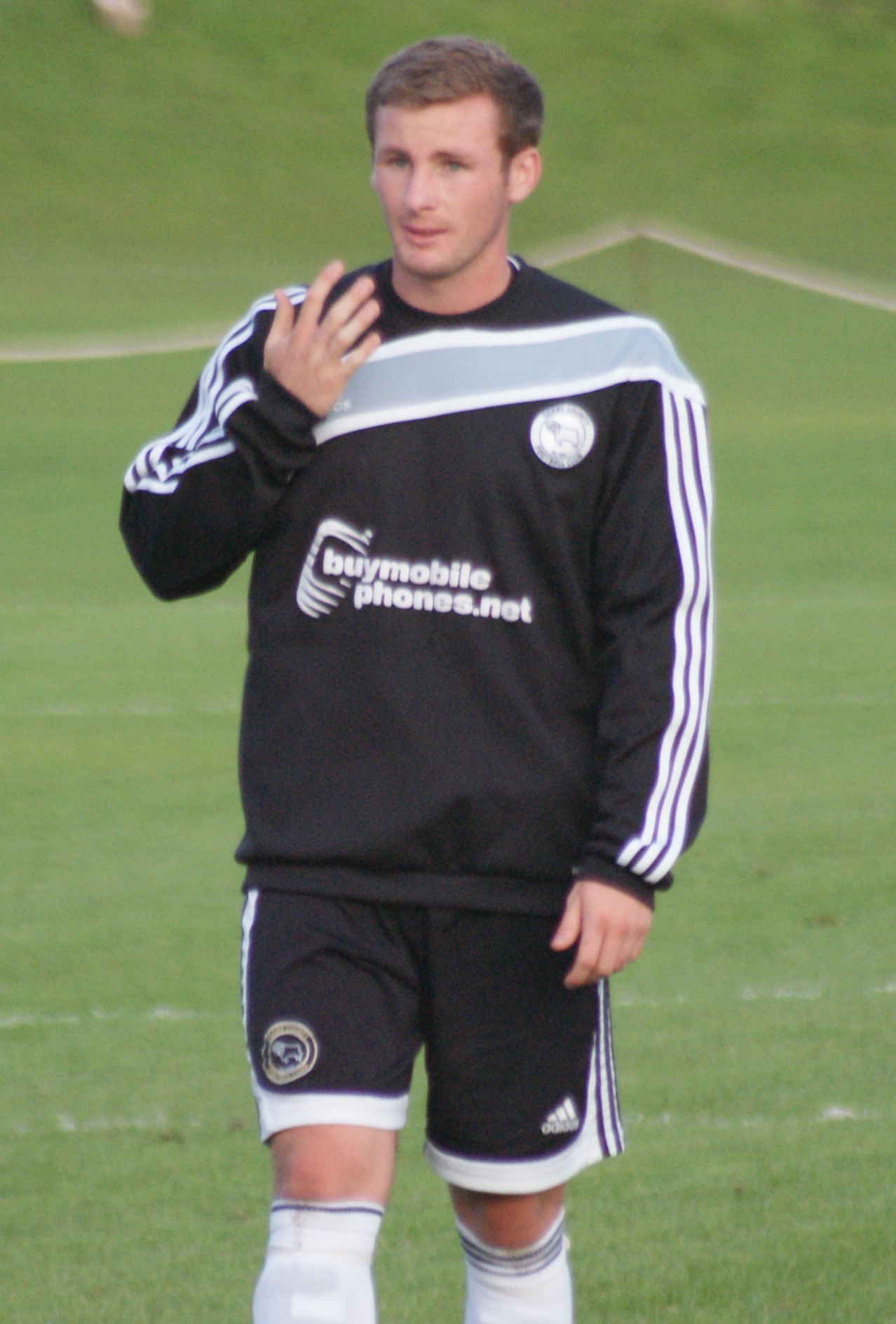
- Dudley in 2009 with Derby County

Personal information
- Date of birth: 29 January 1990 (age 36)
- Place of birth: Doncaster, England
- Position: Defender

Youth career
- Derby County

Senior career*
Years	Team	Apps	(Gls)
2008–2010	Derby County	1	(0)
2009	→ Tamworth (loan)	8	(0)
2009	→ Alfreton Town (loan)	1	(0)
2009–2010	→ Hinckley United (loan)	10	(0)
2010	St Patrick's Athletic	0	(0)
2011–2012	Hinckley United	32	(0)
Total		52	(0)
- * Club domestic league appearances and goals

Mark Dudley (born 29 January 1990) is an English former professional footballer who played as a defender.

== Career ==
=== Early career ===
Dudley was born in Doncaster, England. Following a loan spell at Conference North side Tamworth, where he played eight times as the club won the division, Dudley made his debut for Derby County as an 84th minute sub for Stephen Pearson in a 3–1 defeat away to Watford on 3 May 2009.

For the 2009–10 season Dudley was given the squad number 33, but was not involved in first team duties, instead spending loan spells at Alfreton Town and Hinckley United. At the end of the 2009–10 season Derby announced that, along with several first team players such as Gary Teale and Jay McEveley, Dudley would be released at the end of their contracts in June 2010. Following the completion of his Derby contract he signed for League of Ireland Premier Division side St Patrick's Athletic, although he never played a game for the club.

=== Hinckley United ===
Dudley signed for Hinckley United in August 2011 following a loan spell the previous season. He signed on at Hinckley United for a second season, 2012–13, during the summer of 2012. He left the club within the first month of the 2012–13 season.

=== Brigg ===
Dudley played the remainder of the 2012–13 season for Brigg Town.
