= 2008–09 Crewe Alexandra F.C. season =

Crewe Alexandra
2008–2009 season
- Chairman: John Bowler
- Manager: Guðjón Þórðarson
- League One: 22nd
- FA Cup: Third round
- League Cup: Third round
- Football League Trophy: Second round
- Top goalscorer: League: All: Tom Pope (10)

This article details Crewe Alexandra's 2008–09 season in League One, their 85th competitive season in the English Football League.

== Events ==
This will be a list of the significant events to occur at the club during the 2008–09 season, presented in chronological order.

9 August 2009- season begins with a 2–1 loss at home to Brighton.
26 August 2009- Crewe progress into the third round of the League Cup with wins over Barnsley and then Bristol City, and are drawn to face Liverpool at Anfield.

== Statistics ==
Technical Director	Dario Gradi
Chairman	John Bowler
Highest attendance	7138
Lowest attendance	3432
Transfer Spending	£ 330,000 ▲
Transfer Income	£2,200,000 ▼

== Players ==
=== Squad information ===
N	Pos.	Nat.	Name	Age	EU	Since	App	Goals	Ends	Transfer fee	Notes
1	GK	(England)	Collis	27	EU	2008	0	0	30 June 2010	Free	
2	DF	(England)	Woodards	24	EU	2007	51	0	30 June 2010	£30,000	
3	DF	(England)	Jones	25	EU	2007	26	0	30 June 2010	£65,000	
4	MF	(England)	Schumacher	24	EU	2007	29	1	30 June 2010	Free	
6	DF	(France)	Baudet	29	EU	2006	77	2	30 June 2009	Free	
7	MF	(Germany)	Bopp	24	EU	2007	12	1	30 June 2010	Free	
8	MF	(Northern Ireland)	O'Connor	20	EU	2005	59	1	30 June 2010	Youth system	
9	FW	(England)	Elding	26	EU	2008	0	0	30 June 2011	Undisclosed	
10	FW	(Democratic Republic of the Congo)	Zola	23	Non-EU	2008	0	0	30 June 2011	£200,000	
11	MF	(England)	Grant	20	EU	2008	0	0	30 June 2011	£130,000	
12	MF	(England)	Rix	24	EU	2001	152	4	30 June 2009	Youth system	
13	GK	(England)	Legzdins	21	EU	2008	0	0	30 June 2010	Free	
14	DF	(England)	McCready	26	EU	2007	117	2	30 June 2009	Free	
15	DF	(Nigeria)	Abbey	29	EU	2007	23	0	30 June 2010	Free	
16	MF	(England)	Livermore	18	EU	2008	0	0	11 January 2009	Loan	On loan from Tottenham Hotspur
17	FW	(England)	Moore	19	EU	2007	36	2	30 June 2010	Youth system	
18	MF	(England)	Carrington	21	EU	2005	14	0	30 June 2009	Youth system	
19	FW	(England)	Pope	22	EU	2005	32	7	30 June 2009	Free	
20	FW	(England)	Miller	20	EU	2006	25	4	30 June 2011	Youth system	
21	GK	(England)	Tomlinson	23	EU	2001	17	0	30 June 2009	Youth system	
22	DF	(England)	Daniel	20	EU	2007	1	0	30 June 2009	Free	
23	MF	(England)	Bailey	19	EU	2007	1	0	30 June 2009	Youth system	
25	MF	(England)	Roberts	21	EU	2004	129	11	30 June 2009	Youth system	
26	MF	(England)	Clements	18	EU	2008	0	0	30 June 2009	Youth system	
–	DF	(England)	Danville	18	EU	2008	0	0	30 June 2009	Youth system	
–	FW	(England)	Leitch-Smith	18	EU	2008	0	0	30 June 2009	Youth system	
–	MF	(England)	Murphy	18	EU	2008	0	0	30 June 2009	Youth system	
–	DF	(England)	O'Donnell	22	EU	2007	59	2	30 June 2010	£100,000	
–	FW	(England)	Thompson	17	EU	2008	0	0	30 June 2009	Youth system	
–	DF	(England)	Westwood	18	EU	2008	0	0	30 June 2009	Youth system	

- Source: Wikipedia players' articles, Crewe Alexandra, crewe-mad
- Ordered by Squad Number.

Appearances (starts and substitute appearances) and goals include those in the League One (and playoffs), FA Cup, League Cup and Football League Trophy.

=== Squad stats ===
				Total			League One		FA Cup		Football League Cup		Football League Trophy		Notes
No.	Pos.	Nat.	Name	Sts	App	Gls	App	Gls	App	Gls	App	Gls	App	Gls	Notes
1	GK	(England)	Collis	7	7		4				2		1		
2	DF	(England)	Woodards	7	7		4				2		1		
3	DF	(England)	Jones	6	7	1	4				2		1	1	
4	MF	(England)	Schumacher	1	4	1	1				2		1	1	
5	DF	(England)	O'Donnell	4	4	1	2				1		1	1	
6	DF	(France)	Baudet	7	7		4				2		1		
7	MF	(Germany)	Bopp	1	1		1								Groin Strain
8	MF	(Northern Ireland)	O'Connor	6	6	1	4				2	1			
9	FW	(England)	Elding	6	7	3	4	1			2	2	1		
10	FW	(Democratic Republic of the Congo)	Zola	2	3	1	2	1					1		
11	MF	(England)	Grant	6	6	1	4	1			2				
12	MF	(England)	Rix	2	3		1				1		1		
13	GK	(England)	Legzdins												
14	DF	(England)	McCready	3	2	1	1	1			1				
15	DF	(Nigeria)	Abbey		1		1								
16	MF	(England)	Livermore												Fractured Fibula
17	FW	(England)	Moore	6	7	1	4				2	1	1		
18	MF	(England)	Carrington		1						1				
19	FW	(England)	Pope	5	5	1	3	1			2				
20	FW	(England)	Miller	1	3		2						1		
21	GK	(England)	Tomlinson												
22	MF	(England)	Daniel		1		1								
23	MF	(England)	Bailey	6	6		4				2				
25	MF	(England)	Roberts												On loan to Yeovil Town.
26	MF	(England)	Clements												
27	FW	(England)	Donaldson		4		2				1		1		
29	DF	(England)	Westwood												
30	DF	(England)	Brayford												

Ordered by Squad Numbers
0 shown as blank

==== Disciplinary record ====
N	Pos.	Nat.	Name	Yellow card	Second yellow card	Red card	Notes
8	MF	(Northern Ireland)	O'Connor	2	0	0	
19	FW	(England)	Pope	1	0	0	
12	MF	(England)	Rix	1	0	0	

Only competitive matches
(yellow card) = Number of bookings; (second yellow card) = Number of sending offs after a second yellow card; (red card) = Number of sending offs by a direct red card.

==== Awards ====
===== Individual =====
Date	Country	N	P	Name	Award	Notes
2008-08-26	(England) ENG	11	MF	Grant	League One Team of the Week	

===== Club =====
Date	Period	Award	Notes
23 February	Season 2007/08	Bobby Moore Fair Play award	Source

=== Players in and out ===
==== In ====
No.	Pos.	Nat.	Name	Age	EU	Moving from	Type	Transfer window	Ends	Transfer fee	Source
13	GK	(England)	Legzdins	21	EU	Birmingham City	Transfer ✓	Summer	30 June 2010	Free	
11	MF	(England)	Grant	20	EU	Aldershot Town	Transfer ✓	Summer	30 June 2011	£130,000	
10	FW	(Democratic Republic of the Congo)	Zola	23	Non-EU	Tranmere Rovers	Transfer ✓	Summer	30 June 2011	£200,000	
1	GK	(England)	Collis	27	EU	Southend United	Transfer ✓	Summer	30 June 2010	Free	
24	FW	(England)	Elding	26	EU	Leeds United	Transfer ✓	Summer	30 June 2011	Undisclosed	
TBA	FW	(England)	Donaldson	24	EU	Hibernian (Scotland)	Transfer ✓	Summer	30 June 1011	Undisclosed	
TBA	DF	(England)	McManus	19	EU	Manchester United	Transfer ✓	Summer	30 June 2010	Free	
16	MF	(England)	Livermore	18	EU	Tottenham Hotspur	Loan ✓	Summer	11 January 2009	Loan	

==== Out ====
No.	Pos.	Nat.	Name	Age	EU	Moving to	Type	Transfer window	Transfer fee	Source
5	DF	(England)	Cox	36	EU		Retired	Summer	Free	
20	FW	(England)	Bailey	22	EU	Northwich Victoria	Transfer ✓	Summer	Free	
1	GK	(England)	Williams	25	EU	Carlisle United	Transfer ✓	Summer	Free	
16	FW	(England)	Lowe	29	EU	Chester City	Transfer ✓	Summer	Free	
21	GK	(Wales)	Fôn Williams	21	EU	Stockport County	Transfer ✓	Summer	Free	
9	FW	(England)	Maynard	22		Bristol City	Transfer ✓	Summer	£2.2m	
29	DF	(England)	Lynch	21	EU		Considering Retirement	Summer	Free	
26	FW	(England)	Brown	19	EU	Darlington	Contract Offer	Summer	Free	
24	FW	(England)	Farquharson	19	EU		Released	Summer	Free	

EU = if holds or not a European Union passport; Country: when 2 flags, 1st flag = country that plays for internationally, 2nd flag = country of birth; N = number on jersey; P = Position (for position name, pause mouse pointer on abbreviation); Name = Name on jersey (for more extensive name, pause mouse pointer on name); Age = age on the day of the signing; Moving from = only indicate the club the player was playing before start playing for this club in this season, for the type of the moving see Status column; Moving to = only indicates the club the player is going to play next, for the type of the moving see Status column; Ends = when the player's current contract ends; n/a = Not applicable.

== Club ==
=== Coaching staff ===
Position	Staff

Source: Crewe Alexandra Staff

== Competitions ==
=== League One ===
==== Table ====
Pos	Team	Pld	W	D	L	GF	GA	GD	Pts	Promotion or relegation
20	Carlisle United	46	12	14	20	56	69	−13	50	
21	Northampton Town (R)	46	12	13	21	61	65	−4	49	Relegation to Football League Two
22	Crewe Alexandra (R)	46	12	10	24	59	82	−23	46	Relegation to Football League Two
23	Cheltenham Town (R)	46	9	12	25	51	91	−40	39	Relegation to Football League Two
24	Hereford United (R)	46	9	7	30	42	79	−37	34	Relegation to Football League Two

Updated to match(es) played on 2 May 2009. Source: The Football League
Rules for classification: 1) points; 2) goal difference; 3) number of goals scored.
(R) Relegated

==== Results summary ====
Overall								Home						Away					
Pld	W	D	L	GF	GA	GD	Pts	W	D	L	GF	GA	GD	W	D	L	GF	GA	GD
46	12	10	24	59	82	−23	46	8	4	11	30	38	−8	4	6	13	29	44	−15

Last updated: 16 May 2009.
Source: http://www.crewealexandra-mad.co.uk/footydb/loadlgt.asp

==== Results by round ====
Round	1	2	3	4	5	6	7	8	9	10	11	12	13	14	15	16	17	18	19	20	21	22	23	24	25	26	27	28	29	30	31	32	33	34	35	36	37	38	39	40	41	42	43	44	45	46
Ground	H	A	H	A	A	H	H	A	H	A	H	A	A	H	A	H	H	A	A	H	A	H	A	H	A	A	H	A	A	H	H	A	H	H	A	A	H	H	A	H	A	H	A	H	A	H
Result	L	L	W	L	L	W	L	D	L	L	D	L	L	D	L	L	L	L	L	W	D	L	W	W	L	L	W	L	W	W	W	W	L	W	D	W	D	L	D	L	D	D	D	L	L	L

Updated to match(es) played on 16 May 2009. Source: Matches section below
A = Away; H = Home; W = Win; D = Draw; L = Loss

==== Results ====
9 August 2008 1	Crewe Alexandra	1–2	Brighton & Hove Albion	Crewe
	Zola 85'; O'Connor (yellow card) 75' (Unsporting behaviour)	Report	Virgo 36'; Forster (yellow card) 84' (Dissent); Forster 90'	Stadium: Alexandra Stadium; Attendance: 4,557; Referee: J Moss

16 August 2008 2	Carlisle United	4–2	Crewe Alexandra	Carlisle
	Graham 15'; Graham 19'; Dobie 59'; Hackney 76'	Report	McCready 22'; Pope 86'; Pope (yellow card) 90' (Dissent)	Stadium: Brunton Park; Attendance: 6,919; Referee: M Oliver

23 August 2008 3	Crewe Alexandra	2–1	Walsall	Crewe
	Elding 21'; Grant 45'; O'Connor (yellow card) 68' (Unsporting Behaviour)	Report	Hughes 59'; Hughes (yellow card) 70' (Unsporting Behaviour); Ibehre (yellow card) 76' (Unsporting Behaviour); Reich (yellow card) 79' (Unsporting Behaviour)	Stadium: Alexandra Stadium; Attendance: 4,160; Referee: K Wright

30 August 2008 4	Hereford United	2–0	Crewe Alexandra	Hereford
	O'Leary 48'; Hudson-Odoi 56'	Report		Stadium: Edgar Street; Attendance: 2,894

6 September 2008 5	Leeds United	5–2	Crewe Alexandra	Bescot, Leeds
	Delph 26'; Sheehan 36'; Douglas 49'; Beckford 67'; Michalik (yellow card) 69'; Delph (yellow card) 71'; Robinson 82'; Michalik (yellow card) 90+2' (red card)	Report	Baudet (yellow card) 86'; Zola 90+3'; Bopp 90+4'	Stadium: Elland Road; Attendance: 20,075

13 September 2008 6	Crewe Alexandra	2–0	Colchester United	Crewe
	O'Connor 46'; Pope 69'	Report	Ifil (yellow card) 14'; Heath (yellow card) 29'; Platt (yellow card) 45+3'; Gillespie (red card) 87'; Hammond (yellow card) 90+5'	Stadium: Alexandra Stadium; Attendance: 3,510

20 September 2008 7	Crewe Alexandra	3–4	Southend United	Crewe
	O'Connor 25'; Pope 42'; Zola 66'	Report	Freedman 4'; Baudet 21' (o. g.); Freedman 69'; Betsy (yellow card) 86'; Grant 88'	Stadium: Alexandra Stadium; Attendance: 3,574

27 September 2008 8	Bristol Rovers	0–0	Crewe Alexandra	Bristol
	Hinton (yellow card) 85'	Report		Stadium: Memorial Stadium; Attendance: 5,870

4 October 2008 9	Crewe Alexandra	1–3	Northampton Town	Crewe
	O'Connor (yellow card) 39'; Pope 55'	Report	Davis (yellow card) 32'; Jackman 45+1'; Crowe (yellow card) 56'; Akinfenwa 64' (pen.); Osman 70'	Stadium: Alexandra Stadium; Attendance: 3,977

11 October 2008 10	Scunthorpe United	3–0	Crewe Alexandra	Scunthorpe
	Woolford 35'; Hayes 67'; Iriekpen 80'; Mirfin (yellow card) 90'	Report	Schumacher (yellow card) 25'	Stadium: Glanford Park; Attendance: 4,790

18 October 2008 11	Crewe Alexandra	2–2	Milton Keynes Dons	Crewe
	O'Hanlon 32' (o. g. ) Miller 43'	Report	Baldock 15'; O'Hanlon (yellow card) 48'; Chadwick 79'	Stadium: Alexandra Stadium; Attendance: 4,055

21 October 2008 12	Yeovil Town	3–2	Crewe Alexandra	Yeovil
	Owen (yellow card) 37'; Schfield 45+1'; Schofield (yellow card) 56'; Schofield 66'; Way 85'	Report	Zola (yellow card) 45+2'; O'Connor (yellow card) 70'; Moore 73'; Miller 77'	Stadium: Huish Park; Attendance: 3,536

24 October 2008 13	Tranmere Rovers	2–0	Crewe Alexandra	Birkenhead
	Jennings 51'; Shotton (yellow card) 53'; Shuker 74'	Report	Miller (yellow card) 77'; Jones (red card) 87'	Stadium: Prenton Park; Attendance: 5,790

28 October 2008 14	Crewe Alexandra	1–1	Peterborough United	Crewe
	Pope 88'	Report	McLean 14'; Zakuani (yellow card) 37'; Hyde 90'	Stadium: Alexandra Stadium; Attendance: 3,699

1 November 2008 15	Huddersfield Town	3–2	Crewe Alexandra	Huddersfield
	Butler 20'; Parker (yellow card) 36'; Craney 39'; Worthington (yellow card) 64'; Parker 88'; Parker (yellow card) 90+3' (red card)	Report	Donaldson 41'; Donaldson 59'	Stadium: Kirklees Stadium; Attendance: 11,679

15 November 2008 16	Crewe Alexandra	0–2	Leyton Orient	Crewe
	Grant (yellow card) 18'; O'Connor (yellow card) 58'	Report	Saah (yellow card) 14'; Mkandawire 55'; Boyd 74'	Stadium: Alexandra Stadium; Attendance: 3,872

22 November 2008 17	Crewe Alexandra	0–3	Stockport County	Crewe
	Jones (yellow card) 71'	Report	Davies 48'; Pilkington 66'; Thompson 90+4'	Stadium: Alexandra Stadium; Attendance: 5,337

25 November 2008 18	Leicester City	2–1	Crewe Alexandra	Leicester
	Fryatt 15'; King 72'	Report	Zola 70'	Stadium: Walkers Stadium; Attendance: 16,961

6 December 2008 19	Cheltenham Town	1–0	Crewe Alexandra	Cheltenham
	Diallo 48'	Report		Stadium: Whaddon Road; Attendance: 4,052

13 December 2008 20	Crewe Alexandra	1–0	Swindon Town	Crewe
	Miller 45+4'	Report	Paynter (red card) 67'; Ifil (yellow card) 81'	Stadium: Alexandra Stadium; Attendance: 3,941

20 December 2008 21	Millwall	0–0	Crewe Alexandra	Bermondsey, London
	Robinson (yellow card) 13'; Grabban (yellow card) 54'	Report		Stadium: The Den; Attendance: 9,018

26 December 2008 22	Crewe Alexandra	0–3	Oldham Athletic	Crewe
		Report	Byfield 57'; Hughes 68'; Hazell (yellow card) 73'; Hughes 85'	Stadium: Alexandra Stadium; Attendance: 5,780

28 December 2008 23	Hartlepool United	1–4	Crewe Alexandra	Hartlepool
	Porter 48'	Report	Brayford 45'; Nelson 56' (o.g.); Murphy 61'; Miller 83'	Stadium: Victoria Park; Attendance: 3,877

17 January 2009 24	Crewe Alexandra	3–2	Scunthorpe United	Crewe
	O'Connor 60' (pen.); O'Connor (yellow card) 66'; Donaldson 72'; O'Donnell 90+3'	Report	Hayes 19'; Thompson (yellow card) 54'; O'Donnell 70' (o. g. ) Byrne (yellow card) 90+2'	Stadium: Alexandra Stadium; Attendance: 3,811

24 January 2009 25	Northampton Town	5–1	Crewe Alexandra	Sixfields, Northampton
	Clarke 2'; Jackman 19'; Doig (yellow card) 28'; Clarke 55'; Davis 57'; Clarke 70' (pen.) (Hat-trick)	Report	Baudet (red card) 18'; Carrington (yellow card) 19'; Daniel 30'; Daniel (yellow card) 69'; O'Connor (yellow card) 70'	Stadium: Sixfields Stadium; Attendance: 4,675

27 January 2009 26	Peterborough United	4–2	Crewe Alexandra	Peterborough
	Boyd 50'; McLean 53'; Keates 69'; Boyd 87'	Report	Pope 2'; Pope 57'	Stadium: London Road Stadium; Attendance: 5,782

31 January 2009 27	Crewe Alexandra	2–1	Tranmere Rovers	Crewe
	Donaldson (yellow card) 9'; Grant (yellow card) 82'Carrington 83'; Grant 82'	Report	Shotton (yellow card) 5'; Kray 26'; Barnett (yellow card) 72'; Chorley (yellow card) 77'	Stadium: Alexandra Stadium; Attendance: 4,936

14 February 2009 28	Leyton Orient	1–0	Crewe Alexandra	Leyton, London
	Purches 11'; Smith (yellow card) 44'	Report	Baudet (yellow card) 28'; Jones (yellow card) 88'	Stadium: Brisbane Road; Attendance: 3,705

17 February 2009 29	Southend United	0–1	Crewe Alexandra	Southend-on-Sea
	Francis (yellow card) 8'; Dervite (yellow card) 69'	Report	Jones 34'	Stadium: Roots Hall; Attendance: 6,614

21 February 2009 30	Crewe Alexandra	3–1	Huddersfield Town	Crewe
	Moore 32'; Pope 58'; Donaldson 60'; Broomes (yellow card) 63'	Report	Williams (yellow card) 13'; Berrett 30'	Stadium: Alexandra Stadium; Attendance: 5,056

24 February 2009 31	Crewe Alexandra	2–0	Yeovil Town	Crewe
	Donaldson 45+1'; Pope (yellow card) 53'; Brayford 79'	Report	Peltier (yellow card) 75'	Stadium: Alexandra Stadium; Attendance: 3,432

28 February 2009 32	Brighton & Hove Albion	0–4	Crewe Alexandra	Brighton
	McNulty (yellow card) 32'; Cox (yellow card) 54'	Report	Jones 24' (pen.); Daniel (yellow card) 30'; Baudet (yellow card) 40'; Schumacher 79'; Jones 84'; Sigurdsson 89'	Stadium: Withdean Stadium; Attendance: 6,366

3 March 2009 33	Crewe Alexandra	1–2	Carlisle United	Crewe
	Donaldson 34'; Baudet (yellow card) 71'	Report	Taylor 17'; Raven (yellow card) 38'; Kavanagh (yellow card) 57'; Anyinsah 73'	Stadium: Alexandra Stadium; Attendance: 3,759

7 March 2009 34	Crewe Alexandra	2–1	Hereford United	Crewe
	Zola (yellow card) 37'; Jones 55' (pen.); Jones 82'	Report	Hewson (yellow card) 55'; Diagouraga 79'	Stadium: Alexandra Stadium; Attendance: 5,195

10 March 2009 35	Walsall	1–1	Crewe Alexandra	Bescot, Walsall
	Deeney 57'	Report	Schumacher 90+3'	Stadium: Bescot Stadium; Attendance: 3,604

14 March 2009 36	Colchester United	0–1	Crewe Alexandra	Colchester
	Izzet 67'	Report	Sigurdsson 18'; Zola 63'; Brayford (yellow card) 86'	Stadium: Colchester Community Stadium; Attendance: 4,907

17 March 2009 37	Crewe Alexandra	1–1	Bristol Rovers	Crewe
	Lawrence 70'	Report	Disley (yellow card) 33'; Duffy 74'	Stadium: Alexandra Stadium; Attendance: 3,879

21 March 2009 38	Crewe Alexandra	2–3	Leeds United	Crewe
	Jones (yellow card) 17' (Dissent); Jones (red card) 17' (Foul & Abusive Language); Pope 60'; Pope 73'	Report	Kilkenny 27'; Becchio 30'; Snodgrass 32'; Naylor (yellow card) 45+4'; Ankergren (yellow card) 90'; Snodgrass (yellow card) 90+3'	Stadium: Alexandra Stadium; Attendance: 7,138

24 March 2009 39	Milton Keynes Dons	2–2	Crewe Alexandra	Denbigh, Milton Keynes
	Wilbraham 15'; Puncheon 19'; Guéret (yellow card) 81'; O'Hanlon (yellow card) 90'; Howell (yellow card) 90+2'; Leven (yellow card) 90+3'	Report	Grant (yellow card) 21'; Brayford (yellow card) 38'; Pope (yellow card) 66'; Carrington 78'; Sigurdsson 82' (pen.)	Stadium: Stadium MK; Attendance: 8,454

28 March 2009 40	Crewe Alexandra	0–1	Millwall	Crewe
	Baudet (yellow card) 76'; Donaldson (yellow card) 84'	Report	Whitbread (yellow card) 45+1'; Alexander (yellow card) 70'; Bolder (yellow card) 73'; Henry (yellow card) 90'; Price 90+2'; Price (yellow card) 90+5'	Stadium: Alexandra Stadium; Attendance: 4,680

4 April 2009 41	Swindon Town	0–0	Crewe Alexandra	Swindon
	Robson-Kanu (yellow card) 51'; Tudur Jones (yellow card) 74'; Vincent (yellow card) 86'	Report		Stadium: County Ground; Attendance: 7,165

11 April 2009 42	Crewe Alexandra	0–0	Hartlepool United	Crewe
		Report		Stadium: Alexandra Stadium; Attendance: 4,477

13 April 2009 43	Oldham Athletic	1–1	Crewe Alexandra	Oldham
	Hazell 41'	Report	Baudet (yellow card) 42'; Moore 89'	Stadium: Boundary Park; Attendance: 4,334

18 April 2009 44	Crewe Alexandra	1–2	Cheltenham Town	Crewe
	Sigurdsson 2'	Report	Artus (yellow card) 38'; Finnigan 58' (pen.); Finnigan (yellow card) 81'; Connor 84'	Stadium: Alexandra Stadium; Attendance: 4,542

24 April 2009 45	Stockport County	4–3	Crewe Alexandra	Edgeley, Stockport
	Vincent 13'; O'Grady 49'; Johnson 65'; Johnson 82'	Report	Jones 24'; Lawrence 80'; McManus 90+1'	Stadium: Edgeley Park; Attendance: 7,134

2 May 2009 46	Crewe Alexandra	0–3	Leicester City	Crewe
		Report	Berner 56'; Dyer 66'; Fryatt 68'	Stadium: Alexandra Stadium; Attendance: 6,982
Note: Crewe Alexandra are relegated to League Two

=== League Cup ===
12 August 2008 First round	Crewe Alexandra	2–0	Barnsley	Alexandra Stadium
	O'Connor 14' (pen.); Elding 36' (pen.)	Report	Kozluk (yellow card) 36' (Unsporting behaviour); Foster (yellow card) 68' (Unsporting behaviour); Odejayi (yellow card) 69' (Unsporting behaviour); León (yellow card) 83' (Unsporting behaviour)	Attendance: 2,492; Referee: A Taylor

26 August 2008 Second round	Crewe Alexandra	2–1	Bristol City	Alexandra Stadium
	Elding 24'; Moore 76'	Report	Wilson 79'	Attendance: 3,227; Referee: A Hall

23 September 2008 Third round	Liverpool	2–1	Crewe Alexandra	Anfield
	Agger 15'; Lucas 58'	Report	O'Connor 25'	Attendance: 28,591

=== FA Cup ===
8 November 2008 First round	Crewe Alexandra	1–0	Ebbsfleet United	Crewe
	O'Donnell (yellow card) 29'; Donaldson 34'; Grant (yellow card) 37'	Report	Hand (yellow card) 64'; Ricketts (yellow card) 79'; Charles (yellow card) 80'	Stadium: Gresty Road; Attendance: 2,593; Referee: Richard West

3 December 2008 Second round	Carlisle United	0–2	Crewe Alexandra	Carlisle
		Report	Miller 3', 12'	Stadium: Brunton Park; Attendance: 2,755; Referee: Andy Woolmer

3 January 2009 Third round	Millwall	2–2	Crewe Alexandra	Bermondsey
	Frampton (yellow card) 20' (goal) 45+2'; Laird 40'; Laird (yellow card) 58'; Kandol (yellow card) 68'; Fuseini (yellow card) 78'	Report	Lawrence 12'; Brayford (yellow card) 45+2'; Shelley 58'; Donaldson (yellow card) 79'	Stadium: The Den; Attendance: 5,754; Referee: Darren Deadman

13 January 2009 Third round replay	Crewe Alexandra	2–3	Millwall	Crewe
	Murphy 7'; Miller 58'	Report	Barron 8' (yellow card) 23'; Harris 54'; Whitbread 86'	Stadium: Gresty Road; Attendance: 3,060; Referee: Nigel Miller

=== Football League Trophy ===
2 September 2008 First round	Crewe Alexandra	3–0	Macclesfield Town	Crewe
	Schumacher 5'; Jones 27'; O'Donnell 42'; Rix (yellow card) 80'	Report	Gritton (yellow card) 10'; Gritton (yellow card) 13' (red card); Bell (yellow card) 56'; Flynn (yellow card) 62'	Stadium: Gresty Road; Attendance: 2,463; Referee: Chris Sarginson

6 October 2008 Second round	Tranmere Rovers	1–0	Crewe Alexandra	Birkenhead
	Shuker 86'	Report		Stadium: Prenton Park; Attendance: 2,626; Referee: Carl Boyeson
