= 2007–08 Crewe Alexandra F.C. season =

Crewe Alexandra
2007–08 season
- Chairman: John Bowler
- Manager: Steve Holland
- League One: 13th
- FA Cup: Second round
- League Cup: First round
- Football League Trophy: First round
- Top goalscorer: League: Maynard (11); All: Maynard (11)
- Highest home attendance: 6,771 (14 January vs Leeds United)
- Lowest home attendance: 2,862 (15 August vs Hull City)
Home colours	Away colours

The 2007–08 season of Crewe Alexandra Football Club's 84th competitive season. They competed in Football League One.

== Events ==
This is a list of the significant events to occur at the club during the 2007–08 season, presented in chronological order. This list does not include transfers (which are listed in the transfers section below), match results (which are in the matches section) or awards (which are in the awards section).

=== 2007 ===
- 20 April: Dario Gradi announces that as from 1 July, would take up a new role as the club's Technical Director whilst gradually allowing first-team coach Steve Holland control of the team.
- 18 June: Crewe win the Bobby Moore Fair Play award for their outstanding conduct and discipline throughout the 2006/07 season.
- 11 August: The opening day of the season sees young striker Nicky Maynard fracture his fibula. He was diagnosed to be out for 3–4 months. Maynard returned as a 46th-minute substitute 112 days later in the FA Cup.
  Crewe end the day top of the league after their 2–1 win over Brighton & Hove Albion.
- 15 August: Crewe are eliminated from the Carling Cup by Championship side Hull City after a 3–0 loss at home.
- 25 August: Crewe drop out of the play-off zone after a 2–0 loss to Leyton Orient.
- 4 September: Crewe are eliminated from the Johnstone's Paint Trophy by Cheshire-neighbours Chester City after a penalty shootout defeat in the First round
- 1 December: Crewe are eliminated from the FA Cup by League One side Oldham Athletic away from home. This result means that Crewe are eliminated from all cup competitions for the 2007–08 season.
- 3 December: Sky Sports confirm that Crewe's home tie with Leeds United will be shown live on TV. The kickoff was changed to 19:45 GMT on Monday 14 January 2008. Crewe lost the match 1–0.

=== 2008 ===
- 29 January: Crewe enter the relegation zone in League One after a 1–1 draw with Bristol Rovers.
- 9 February: Crewe climb out the relegation zone to 20th after a 2–2 draw with top-of-the-table Swansea City.
- 26 March: Michael O'Connor makes his senior international debut for Northern Ireland in a 4–1 win against Georgia.

== Players ==
=== Squad information ===
N	Pos.	Nat.	Name	Age	EU	Since	App	Goals	Ends	Transfer fee	Notes
1	GK	(England)	Williams	24	EU	2004	90	0	30 June 2008	Free	
2	DF	(England)	Woodards	23	EU	2007	12	0	30 June 2010	£30,000	
3	DF	(England)	B. Jones	24	EU	2007	0	0	30 June 2010	£65,000	
4	MF	(England)	Roberts	20	EU	2004	81	7	30 June 2009	Youth system	
5	DF	(England)	Cox (captain)	35	EU	2006	32	1	30 June 2008	Free	
6	DF	(France)	Baudet (VC)	28	EU	2006	43	1	30 June 2009	Free	
7	MF	(England)	Schumacher	23	EU	2007	1	0	30 June 2010	Free	
8	MF	(Northern Ireland)	O'Connor	19	EU	2005	30	0	30 June 2009	Youth system	
9	FW	(England)	Maynard	20	EU	2005	33	17	30 June 2010	Youth system	
10	MF	(Germany)	Bopp	23	EU	2007	0	0	30 June 2010	Free	
12	MF	(England)	Rix	23	EU	2001	103	4	30 June 2009	Youth system	
13	GK	(England)	Tomlinson	22	EU	2001	11	0	30 June 2008	Youth system	On loan at Burton Albion until 21 March 2008
14	DF	(England)	McCready	25	EU	2007	61	17	30 June 2009	Free	
15	FW	(England)	Pope	21	EU	2005	6	1	30 June 2009	Free	
16	FW	(England)	Lowe	28	EU	2006	31	7	30 June 2009	Free	
17	MF	(England)	Carrington	20	EU	2005	0	0	30 June 2009	Youth system	
18	FW	(England)	Moore	18	EU	2007	1	0	30 June 2010	Youth system	
19	FW	(England)	Miller	19	EU	2006	11	3	30 June 2009	Youth system	
20	DF	(England)	M Bailey	21	EU	2005	0	0	30 June 2008	Free	
21	GK	(Wales)	Fôn Williams	20	EU	2006	0	0	30 June 2008	Youth system	
22	DF	(England)	Daniel	19	EU	2007	0	0	30 June 2009	Free	
23	DF	(England)	O'Donnell	21	EU	2007	25	1	30 June 2010	Free	
24	FW	(England)	Farquharson	18	EU	2007	0	0	30 June 2008	Youth system	On loan at Nantwich Town until 28 March 2008
25	MF	(England)	J Bailey	18	EU	2007	0	0	30 June 2008	Youth system	
26	FW	(England)	Brown	18	EU	2007	0	0	30 June 2008	Youth system	On loan at Kidsgrove Athletic until January 2008
28	DF	(Nigeria)	Abbey	28	EU	2007	0	0	30 June 2008	Free	
29	DF	(England)	Lynch	20	EU	2007	0	0	30 June 2008	Free	
30	DF	(Scotland)	Boyle	20	EU	2007	0	0	21 February 2008	Loan	On loan from Everton
32	MF	(England)	G. M. Roberts	23	EU	2007	0	0	12 March 2008	Loan	On loan from Ipswich Town
34	MF	(England)	Lunt	27	EU	2007	0	0	19 March 2008	Loan	On loan from Sheffield Wednesday

- Last updated: 12 February 2008 (all stats except appearances and goals)
- Source: Wikipedia players' articles, Crewe Alexandra, crewe-mad
- Ordered by Squad Number.
- Player must own an EU passport or be a full, current, 'A' international to legally play in English football. (Source)
- Squad size is unlimited.

Appearances (starts and substitute appearances) and goals include those in the League One (and playoffs), FA Cup, League Cup and Football League Trophy.

=== Squad stats ===
				Total			Football League One		FA Cup		Football League Cup		Johnstone's Paint Trophy		Notes
No.	Pos.	Nat.	Name	Sts	App	Gls	App	Gls	App	Gls	App	Gls	App	Gls	Notes
1	GK	(England)	Williams	43	43		40		2		1				
2	DF	(England)	Woodards	38	38		34		2		1		1		
3	DF	(England)	Jones	25	25		21		2		1		1		Knee injury (requires surgery) – back in training
4	MF	(England)	G. S. Roberts	36	38	5	35	5	2		1				
5	DF	(England)	Cox	23	29	1	27		2	1					
6	DF	(France)	Baudet	33	33	1	30	1	1		1		1		
7	MF	(England)	Schumacher	21	24	1	21	1	1		1		1		
8	MF	(Northern Ireland)	O'Connor	16	21		21								
9	FW	(England)	Maynard	19	22	6	21	6	1						
10	MF	(Germany)	Bopp	6	11	1	9	1			1		1		
11	MF	(Wales)	Vaughan		1		1								Transferred to Real Sociedad on 23 August 2007
12	MF	(England)	Rix	25	30		26		2		1		1		Hip (requires surgery) – expected back start 2008–09 season
13	GK	(England)	Tomlinson	1	1								1		Cruciate ligament – expected back 2009
14	DF	(England)	McCready	30	31	2	28	1	2	1	1				
15	FW	(England)	Pope	14	24	6	22	6			1		1		
16	FW	(England)	Lowe	19	31	5	28	4	2				1	1	
17	MF	(England)	Carrington	2	7		5				1		1		
18	FW	(England)	Moore	27	33	2	30	2	2		1				
19	FW	(England)	Miller	7	18	1	16	1			1		1		
20	DF	(England)	Bailey	1	3		2		1						
21	GK	(Wales)	Fôn Williams												
22	DF	(England)	Daniel		1		1								
23	DF	(England)	O'Donnell	18	24	1	23	1					1		
24	FW	(England)	Farquharson	1	1								1		
25	MF	(England)	Bailey		1		1								
26	FW	(England)	Brown		1		1								
27	DF	(England)	Dugdale												Transferred to Droylsden on 26 December 2007
28	DF	(Nigeria)	Abbey	14	17		17								
29	DF	(England)	Lynch	1	3		2						1		
30	FW	(England)	Barnard	9	10	3	10	3							On loan between 30 Aug and 3 Jan from Tottenham Hotspur
30	DF	(Scotland)	Boyle	14	14		14								On loan from 21 Jan from Everton
31	FW	(England)	Dickson	2	3		3								On loan between 15 Aug and 13 Sep from Charlton
31	FW	(Wales)	Church	13	14	1	12	1	2						On loan between 19 Oct and 28 Jan from Reading
32	MF	(England)	Bennett	4	10	1	8	1	2						On loan between 26 Oct and 3 Jan from Wolverhampton Wanderers
32	MF	(England)	G. M. Roberts	4	4		4								On loan from 12 Feb from Ipswich Town
33	FW	(Democratic Republic of the Congo)	Baseya	1	4		3		1						On loan between 16 Nov and 19 Dec from Southampton
34	DF	(Scotland)	Gray	2	2		2								On loan between 23 Nov and 19 Dec from Manchester United
34	MF	(England)	Lunt	7	7		7								On loan from 19 Feb from Sheffield Wednesday
35	MF	(England)	Anyinsah	2	4		4								On loan from Preston North End
36	FW	(England)	Morgan	5	5	2	5	2							On loan from Luton Town

Last updated: 24 March 2008
Source: Crewe Alexandra
Ordered by Squad Numbers
0 shown as blank

==== Disciplinary record ====
N	Pos.	Nat.	Name	Yellow card	Second yellow card	Red card	Notes
4	MF	(England)	G. S. Roberts	4	1	0	Conceded one penalty kick
6	DF	(France)	Baudet	4	0	0	Conceded one penalty kick
30	DF	(Scotland)	Boyle	2	0	0	On loan
8	MF	(Northern Ireland)	O'Connor	2	0	0	Conceded two penalty kicks
12	MF	(England)	Rix	2	0	0	
30	FW	(England)	Barnard	1	0	0	On loan
32	MF	(England)	Bennett	1	0	0	On loan
34	MF	(England)	Lunt	1	0	0	On loan
29	DF	(England)	Lynch	1	0	0	
9	FW	(England)	Maynard	1	0	0	
14	DF	(England)	McCready	1	0	0	Conceded two penalty kicks
19	FW	(England)	Miller	1	0	0	
7	MF	(England)	Schumacher	1	0	0	
1	GK	(England)	Williams	0	0	0	Conceded one penalty kick
2	DF	(England)	Woodards	1	0	0	Conceded one penalty kick

Last updated: 24 March 2008
Source: Crewe Alexandra
Only competitive matches
(yellow card) = Number of bookings; (second yellow card) = Number of sending offs after a second yellow card; (red card) = Number of sending offs by a direct red card.

Crewe currently have the best disciplinary record in The Football League

==== Awards ====
===== Individual =====
Date	Country	N	P	Name	Award	Notes
13 August 2007	(England)	4	MF	G. S. Roberts	Team of the Week	Source
20 August 2007	(England)	2	DF	Woodards	Team of the Week	Source
10 September 2007	(Germany)	10	MF	Bopp	Team of the Week	Source
24 September 2007	(England)	1	GK	Williams	Team of the Week	Source
1 October 2007	(England)	3	DF	Jones	Team of the Week	Source
22 October 2007	(England)	16	FW	Lowe	Team of the Week	Source
5 November 2007	(England)	18	FW	Moore	Team of the Week	Source
19 November 2007	(England)	2	DF	Woodards	Team of the Week (2)	Source
10 December 2007	(England)	2	DF	Woodards	Team of the Week (3)	Source
28 January 2008	(England)	1	GK	Williams	Team of the Week (2)	Source
3 March 2008	(England)	1	GK	Williams	Team of the Week (3)	Source
17 March 2008	(England)	8	MF	O'Connor	Team of the Week	Source

===== Club =====
Date	Period	Award	Notes
18 June	Season 2006/07	Bobby Moore Fair Play award	

=== Players in / out ===
==== In ====
No.	Pos.	Nat.	Name	Age	EU	Moving from	Type	Transfer window	Ends	Transfer fee	Source
10	MF	(Germany)	Bopp	23	EU	Rotherham United	Transferred ✓	Summer		Free	
15	FW	(England)	Pope	21	EU		Youth team ✓	Summer		Free	
17	MF	(England)	Carrington	20	EU		Youth team ✓	Summer		Free	
21	GK	(England)	Fôn Williams	20	EU		Youth team ✓	Summer		Free	
29	DF	(England)	Lynch	20	EU		Unattached ✓	Summer		Free	
28	DF	(England)	Abbey	28	EU		Unattached ✓	Summer		Free	
14	DF	(England)	McCready	25	EU		Unattached ✓	Summer		Free	
3	DF	(England)	Jones	23	EU	Exeter City	Transferred ✓	Summer		£65,000	
7	MF	(England)	Schumacher	23	EU	Bradford City	Transferred ✓	Summer		Free	
30	FW	(England)	Barnard	23	EU	Tottenham Hotspur	Loan end	Summer	3 January 2008	Loan	
31	FW	(England)	Dickson	22	EU	Charlton Athletic	Loan end	Summer	13 September 2007	Loan	
31	FW	(Wales)	Church	18	EU	Reading	Loan end	Winter	28 January 2008	Loan	Crewe Alexandra
32	MF	(England)	Bennett	18	EU	Wolverhampton Wanderers	Loan end	Winter	3 January 2008	Loan	Crewe Alexandra
33	FW	(Democratic Republic of the Congo) (France)	Baseya	19	EU	Southampton	Loan end	Winter	19 December 2007	Loan	Crewe Alexandra
34		(Scotland)	Gray	19	EU	Manchester United	Loan end	Winter	3 January 2008	Loan	Crewe Alexandra
30	DF	(Scotland)	Boyle	20	EU	Everton	Loan ✓	Winter	21 February 2008	Loan	Crewe Alexandra
32	MF	(England)	G. M. Roberts	23	EU	Ipswich Town	Loan ✓	Winter	12 March 2008	Loan	Crewe Alexandra
34	MF	(England)	Lunt	28	EU	Sheffield Wednesday	Loan ✓	Winter	19 March 2008	Loan	
35	FW	(England)	Anyinsah	23	EU	Preston North End	Loan ✓	Winter		Loan	
36	MF	(England)	Morgan	24	EU	Luton Town	Loan ✓	Winter		Loan	

==== Out ====
No.	Pos.	Nat.	Name	Age	EU	Moving to	Type	Transfer window	Transfer fee	Source
2	FW	(England)	Otsemobor	24	EU	Norwich City	Transfer ✓	Summer	Free	
3	DF	(England)	Jones	20	EU	Preston North End	Transfer ✓	Summer	£500,000^{[*]}	
12	FW	(England)	Varney	24	EU	Charlton Athletic	Transfer ✓	Summer	£2,500,000	
11	MF	(Wales)	Vaughan	24	EU	Real Sociedad (Spain)	Transfer ✓	Summer	£300,000	Crewe Alexandra
26	MF	(England)	Brown	19	EU	Kidsgrove Athletic	Loan ✓	Winter	Loan	
24	FW	(England)	Farquharson	19	EU	Northwich Victoria	Loan end	Winter	Loan	
29	DF	(England)	Lynch	21	EU	Stafford Rangers	Loan ✓	Winter	Loan	
22	MF	(England)	Daniel	19	EU	Grays Athletic	Loan ✓	Winter	Loan	
27	DF	(England)	Dugdale	20	EU	Droylsden	Free ✓	Winter	Free	
24	FW	(England)	Farquharson	19	EU	Nantwich Town	Loan ✓	Winter	Loan	
13	GK	(England)	Tomlinson	22	EU	Burton Albion	Loan ✓	Winter	Loan	BBC Sport

Last updated: 8 March 2008
EU = if holds or not a European Union passport; Country: when 2 flags, 1st flag = country that plays for internationally, 2nd flag = country of birth; N = number on jersey; P = Position (for position name, pause mouse pointer on abbreviation); Name = Name on jersey (for more extensive name, pause mouse pointer on name); Age = age on the day of the signing; Moving from = only indicate the club the player was playing before start playing for this club in this season, for the type of the moving see Status column; Moving to = only indicates the club the player is going to play next, for the type of the moving see Status column; Ends = when the player's current contract ends; n/a = Not applicable.

Initial fee of £500,000, plus clauses:

- £62,500 for 15, 30 and 45 appearances for Preston North End
- 20% sell-on clause
- £250,000 should Jones achieve promotion whilst at Preston North End.

== Club ==
=== Coaching staff ===
Position	Staff
Technical Director	(England) Dario Gradi MBE
First team coach / Academy Director	(England) Steve Holland
Assistant manager	(England) Neil Baker
Assistant Academy manager	(England) James Collins
Assistant Academy manager	(England) Neil Critchley
Chief scout	(England) Glyn Chamberlain
Senior physiotherapist	(England) Matt Radcliffe
Physiotherapist	(England) Steve Walker
Fitness coach	(England) Andy Franks
Academy Recruitment Officer	(England) Phil Swift
Academy Welfare Officer / Academy Administration	(England) Malcolm Hughes

Last updated: 26 August 2007
Source: Crewe Alexandra Staff

=== Other information ===
Chairman	John Bowler
Vice Chairman	Norman Hassell
Director	Richard Clayton
Director	Dario Gradi MBE
Director	Mark Hassell
Director	Jim McMillan
Director	Daniel Potts
Director	David Rowlinson
Director	Jimmy Rowlinson
Head Groundsman	John Huxley
Ground (capacity and dimensions)	Alexandra Stadium (10,153 / 100 x 66 yd (60 m))

Updated to match played 26 August 2007
Source: Crewe Alexandra Staff

=== Kits ===
Home; Supplier: Diadora; Sponsors: Mornflake Oats	Away; Supplier: Diadora; Sponsors: Mornflake Oats	Home goalkeepers Supplier: Diadora; Sponsors: Mornflake Oats	Away goalkeepers Supplier: Diadora; Sponsors: Mornflake Oats

== Competitions ==
=== Overall ===
Competition	Started round	Final position / round	First match	Last match
Football League One	—	20	11 August 2007	3 May 2008
Football League Cup	1st round	1st round	15 August 2007	
Johnstone's Paint Trophy	1st round	1st round	4 September 2007	
FA Cup	1st round	2nd round	10 November 2007	1 December 2007

Updated to match played 24 March 2008
Source: Competitions

=== League One ===
==== Table ====
Pos	Team	Pld	W	D	L	GF	GA	GD	Pts	Promotion, qualification or relegation
18	Yeovil Town	46	14	10	22	38	59	−21	52	
19	Cheltenham Town	46	13	12	21	42	64	−22	51	
20	Crewe Alexandra	46	12	14	20	47	65	−18	50	
21	AFC Bournemouth (R)	46	17	7	22	62	72	−10	48 (Note: Bournemouth deducted 10 points for entering administration.)	Relegation to Football League Two
22	Gillingham (R)	46	11	13	22	44	73	−29	46	Relegation to Football League Two

Updated to match(es) played on unknown. Source: The Football League
Rules for classification: 1) points; 2) goal difference; 3) number of goals scored.
(R) Relegated

==== Results summary ====
Overall								Home						Away					
Pld	W	D	L	GF	GA	GD	Pts	W	D	L	GF	GA	GD	W	D	L	GF	GA	GD
45	12	14	19	46	61	−15	50	8	6	8	26	29	−3	4	8	11	20	32	−12

Last updated: 29 April 2008.
Source: Sky Sports

==== Results by round ====
Round	1	2	3	4	5	6	7	8	9	10	11	12	13	14	15	16	17	18	19	20	21	22	23	24	25	26	27	28	29	30	31	32	33	34	35	36	37	38	39	40	41	42	43	44	45	46
Ground	H	A	H	A	H	A	H	A	A	H	A	H	A	H	A	H	A	H	H	A	H	A	A	H	H	A	A	H	H	A	H	A	A	H	A	H	H	A	H	A	A	H	A	H	A	H
Result	W	D	L	D	W	L	D	L	D	L	L	W	D	W	W	W	L	L	D	L	L	D	L	W	L	L	L	D	D	L	D	W	D	L	D	D	L	W	W	D	L	L	W	W	L	L

Updated to match(es) played on 24 March 2008. Source: Sky Sports
A = Away; H = Home; W = Win; D = Draw; L = Loss

==== Matches ====
11 August 2007 1	Crewe Alexandra	2–1	Brighton & Hove Albion	Crewe
	G. S. Roberts 22' (pen.); G. S. Roberts 79'	Report	Dean Cox 14'; Andy Whing (yellow card) 57' (Unsporting behavior); Dean Cox (yellow card) 86' (Unsporting behavior)	Stadium: Gresty Road; Attendance: 5,394; Referee: S Bratt

18 August 2007 2	Bristol Rovers	1–1	Crewe Alexandra	Bristol
	Joe Jacobson (yellow card) 25' (Unsporting behaviour); Craig Disley 32'	Report	Tom Pope 34'	Stadium: The Memorial Stadium; Attendance: 7,750; Referee: G Salisbury

25 August 2007 3	Crewe Alexandra	0–2	Leyton Orient	Crewe
	G. S. Roberts (yellow card) 83' (Unsporting behaviour)	Report	JJ Melligan 35'; Adam Boyd 85' (pen.)	Stadium: Gresty Road; Attendance: 4,683; Referee: D Drysdale

1 September 2007 4	Swindon Town	1–1	Crewe Alexandra	Swindon
	Michael Pook 24'	Report	Steven Schumacher 42'	Stadium: County Ground; Attendance: 6,595; Referee: K Friend

8 September 2007 5	Crewe Alexandra	2–0	Huddersfield Town	Crewe
	Lee Barnard 16'; Eugen Bopp 39'	Report	Andy Booth (yellow card) 20' (Unsporting behavior)	Stadium: Gresty Road; Attendance: 5,164; Referee: N Swarbrick

16 September 2007 6	Doncaster Rovers	2–0	Crewe Alexandra	Doncaster
	Paul Heffernan 31'; Danny Woodards 48' (o.g.)	Report		Stadium: Keepmoat Stadium; Attendance: 6,726; Referee: D Deadman

22 September 2007 7	Crewe Alexandra	0–0	Millwall	Crewe
		Report	Gary Alexander (yellow card) 36' (Unsporting behavior); Ben May (yellow card) 72' (Unsporting behavior)	Stadium: Gresty Road; Attendance: 4,478; Referee: P Joslin

29 September 2007 8	Oldham Athletic	3–2	Crewe Alexandra	Oldham
	Mark Allott 36'; Matthew Wolfenden 83'; Neil Kilkenny 90+1'	Report	Lee Barnard 17'; Byron Moore 26'	Stadium: Boundary Park; Attendance: 5,082; Referee: A Taylor

2 October 2007 9	Tranmere Rovers	1–1	Crewe Alexandra	Birkenhead
	Chris Shuker 65'; Shane Cansdell-Sheriff (yellow card) 87' (Unsporting behavior)	Report	G. S. Roberts 56' (pen.)	Stadium: Prenton Park; Attendance: 6,155; Referee: S Mathieson

6 October 2007 10	Crewe Alexandra	1–4	Bournemouth	Crewe
	Shaun Miller 89'	Report	Lee Bradbury 37'; Max Gradel 61', 77'; Darren Anderton 85'	Stadium: Gresty Road; Attendance: 4,799; Referee: C Webster

13 October 2007 11	Southend United	3–0	Crewe Alexandra	Southend-on-Sea
	Nick Bailey 17'; Adam Barrett (yellow card) 18' (Unsporting behavior); Gary Hooper 63'; Leon Clarke 82' (pen.)	Report	Lee Barnard (yellow card) 5' (Unsporting behaviour); Ben Rix (yellow card) 82' (Dissent)	Stadium: Roots Hall; Attendance: 6,927; Referee: A Penn

20 October 2007 12	Crewe Alexandra	2–0	Luton Town	Crewe
	Ryan Lowe 14', 40'	Report	Alan Goodall (yellow card) 25' (Unsporting behavior)	Stadium: Gresty Road; Attendance: 4,490; Referee: E Ilderton

27 October 2007 13	Cheltenham Town	2–2	Crewe Alexandra	Cheltenham
	Alan Wright 85'; David Bird 89'	Report	Simon Church 74'; Ryan Lowe 78'	Stadium: Whaddon Road; Attendance: 3,605; Referee: D McDermidd

3 November 2007 14	Crewe Alexandra	2–0	Yeovil Town	Crewe
	Chris McCready 28'; Byron Moore 40'	Report	Justin Cochrane (yellow card) 34' (Unsporting behavior); Terrell Forbes (yellow card) 44' (Unsporting behavior); Scott Guyett (yellow card) 89' (Unsporting behavior)	Stadium: Gresty Road; Attendance: 4,363; Referee: J Moss

6 November 2007 15	Port Vale	0–1	Crewe Alexandra	Burslem, Stoke-on-Trent
	Craig Rocastle (yellow card) 72' (Dissent)	Report	Ben Rix (yellow card) 22' (Unsporting behaviour); Elliott Bennett (yellow card) 70' (Unsporting behaviour), 76'	Stadium: Vale Park; Attendance: 5,329; Referee: R Beeby

17 November 2007 16	Crewe Alexandra	1–0	Northampton Town	Crewe
	Ryan Lowe 59'	Report	Guy Branston (yellow card) 31' (Unsporting behaviour); Ryan Gilligan (yellow card) 43' (Unsporting behaviour)	Stadium: Gresty Road; Attendance: 4,531; Referee: A Haines

24 November 2007 17	Nottingham Forest	2–0	Crewe Alexandra	Nottingham
	Arron Davies 45'; Sammy Clingan 52'	Report	Danny Woodards (yellow card) 51' (Unsporting behaviour)	Stadium: City Ground; Attendance: 16,650; Referee: M Oliver

4 December 2007 18	Crewe Alexandra	2–3	Gillingham	Crewe
	Byron Moore 43'; G. S. Roberts 49'; Chris McCready (yellow card) 56' (Unsporting behaviour)	Report	Mark Bentley 8'; Andrew Crofts (yellow card) 27' (Unsporting behaviour); Mark Bentley (yellow card) 51' (Unsporting behaviour); Chris Dickson 56' (pen.); Chris Dickson 73'	Stadium: Gresty Road; Attendance: 3,929; Referee: G Laws

8 December 2007 19	Crewe Alexandra	0–0	Walsall	Crewe
		Report	Michael Ricketts (yellow card) 83' (Unsporting behaviour)	Stadium: Gresty Road; Attendance: 4,639; Referee: S Mathieson

15 December 2007 20	Hartlepool United	3–0	Crewe Alexandra	Hartlepool
	Michael Nelson 67'; Richard Barker 85'; Richard Barker 88' (pen.)	Report		Stadium: Victoria Park; Attendance: 3,915; Referee: M Haywood

22 December 2007 21	Crewe Alexandra	0–4	Doncaster Rovers	Crewe
	G. S. Roberts (yellow card) 12' (Unsporting behaviour); Shaun Miller (yellow card) 71' (Unsporting behaviour); G. S. Roberts (yellow card) 80' (red card) (Second bookable offence)	Report	Stephen Roberts (yellow card) 24' (Unsporting behaviour); Jason Price 38'; Jason Price 50'; Paul Green 90+1'; Lewis Guy 90+3'	Stadium: Gresty Road; Attendance: 4,122; Referee: D Foster

26 December 2007 22	Huddersfield Town	1–1	Crewe Alexandra	Huddersfield
	Nathan Clarke (yellow card) 31' (Unsporting behaviour); Andy Holdsworth (yellow card) 46' (Unsporting behaviour); Andy Booth 85'; Jon Worthington (yellow card) 86' (Unsporting behaviour)	Report	Lee Barnard 19'	Stadium: Kirklees Stadium; Attendance: 9,795; Referee: D Drysdale

29 December 2007 23	Millwall	2–0	Crewe Alexandra	Bermondsey, London
	Neil Harris 49' (pen.); Ahmet Brković 53'	Report	Michael O'Connor (yellow card) 90' (Dissent)	Stadium: New Den Stadium; Attendance: 8,068; Referee: T Kettle

1 January 2008 24	Crewe Alexandra	4–3	Tranmere Rovers	Crewe
	G. S. Roberts 30' (pen.); G. S. Roberts (yellow card) 40' (Unsporting behaviour); G. S. Roberts 48'; Ryan Lynch (yellow card) 62' (Unsporting behaviour); Nicky Maynard 67'; Danny O'Donnell 89'	Report	Andy Taylor 8'; Chris Greenacre 31'; Antony Kay (yellow card) 33' (Unsporting behaviour); Ian Goodison (red card) 65' (Violent conduct); Paul McLaren 74'	Stadium: Gresty Road; Attendance: 5,137; Referee: J Moss

14 January 2008 25	Crewe Alexandra	0–1	Leeds United	Crewe
		Report	Darren Kenton (yellow card) 35' (Unsporting behaviour); Jermaine Beckford 36'	Stadium: Gresty Road; Attendance: 6,771; Referee: K Friend
Note: Live on Sky Sports

19 January 2008 26	Carlisle United	1–0	Crewe Alexandra	Carlisle
	Joe Garner 52'; Peter Murphy (yellow card) 71'	Report	Nicky Maynard (yellow card) 90+1' (Unsporting behaviour)	Stadium: Brunton Park; Attendance: 6,449; Referee: C Webster

22 January 2008 27	Swansea City	2–1	Crewe Alexandra	Swansea
	Thomas Butler 14'; Paul Anderson 77'	Report	Steven Schumacher (yellow card) 90+2' (Unsporting behaviour); Tom Pope 90+3'	Stadium: Liberty Stadium; Attendance: 11,200; Referee: A Woolmer
Note: Match postponed on 5 January 2008 due to FA Cup fixtures

26 January 2008 28	Crewe Alexandra	0–0	Swindon Town	Crewe
	Julien Baudet (yellow card) 80' (Unsporting behaviour)	Report	Michael Pook (yellow card) 40' (Unsporting behaviour); Billy Paynter (red card) 74' (Serious Foul Play); Jon-Paul McGovern (yellow card) 78' (Unsporting behaviour)	Stadium: Gresty Road; Attendance: 4,344; Referee: K Evans

29 January 2008 29	Crewe Alexandra	1–1	Bristol Rovers	Crewe
	Tom Pope 47'	Report	Ben Williams 45' (o.g.)	Stadium: Gresty Road; Attendance: 3,942; Referee: P Taylor

2 February 2008 30	Brighton & Hove Albion	3–0	Crewe Alexandra	Brighton
	Glenn Murray 23'; Guy Butters 41'; Glenn Murray 45'	Report		Stadium: Withdean Stadium; Attendance: 4,802; Referee: D Whitestone

9 February 2008 31	Crewe Alexandra	2–2	Swansea City	Crewe
	Julien Baudet 82'; Tom Pope 90'	Report	Jason Scotland 9' (pen.); G. S. Roberts 40' (o.g.)	Stadium: Gresty Road; Attendance: 4,955; Referee: N Miller

12 February 2008 32	Leyton Orient	0–1	Crewe Alexandra	Leyton, London
	Charlie Daniels (yellow card) 31' (Unsporting behaviour)	Report	Nicky Maynard 26'; Julien Baudet (yellow card) 45+1' (Unsporting behavior)	Stadium: Brisbane Road; Attendance: 3,881; Referee: G Hegley

23 February 2008 33	Leeds United	1–1	Crewe Alexandra	Leeds
	Ľubomír Michalík (yellow card) 15' (Unsporting behaviour); Trésor Kandol 85'	Report	Patrick Boyle (yellow card) 29' (Dissent); Nicky Maynard 47'	Stadium: Elland Road; Attendance: 21,223; Referee: M Pike

26 February 2008 34	Crewe Alexandra	0–1	Carlisle United	Crewe
	Julien Baudet (yellow card) 83' (Unsporting behaviour)	Report	Scott Dobie 64'	Stadium: Gresty Road; Attendance: 4,786; Referee: P Taylor
Note: Match postponed on 16 February 2008 due to frozen pitch

1 March 2008 35	Northampton Town	0–0	Crewe Alexandra	Northampton
		Report	Kenny Lunt (yellow card) 63' (Unsporting behaviour)	Stadium: Sixfields Stadium; Attendance: 5,507; Referee: M Haywood

8 March 2008 36	Crewe Alexandra	0–0	Nottingham Forest	Crewe
		Report	Arron Davies (yellow card) 25' (Unsporting behaviour); Chris Cohen (yellow card) 48' (Dissent); Julian Bennett (yellow card) 69' (Unsporting behaviour)	Stadium: Gresty Road; Attendance: 6,314; Referee: J Singh

11 March 2008 37	Crewe Alexandra	0–2	Port Vale	Crewe
	Patrick Boyle (yellow card) 15' (Unsporting behaviour); Michael O'Connor (yellow card) 68' (Unsporting behaviour)	Report	Paul Harsley 57' (pen.); Robin Hulbert (yellow card) 65' (Unsporting behaviour); Marc Richards (yellow card) 68' (Unsporting behaviour); Luke Rodgers 81'	Stadium: Gresty Road; Attendance: 5,229; Referee: M Dean

15 March 2008 38	Gillingham	0–3	Crewe Alexandra	Gillingham
	Kevin Maher (red card) 57' (Professional foul)	Report	Tom Pope 9'; Nicky Maynard 50'; Dean Morgan 76'	Stadium: Priestfield Stadium; Attendance: 4,956; Referee: P Joslin

22 March 2008 39	Crewe Alexandra	3–1	Hartlepool United	Crewe
	Nicky Maynard 20'; Nicky Maynard 30'; Julien Baudet (yellow card) 60' (Unsporting behaviour); Nicky Maynard (yellow card) 70' (Unsporting behaviour); Tom Pope 85'	Report	Joel Porter 81'	Stadium: Gresty Road; Attendance: 4,412; Referee: S Attwell

24 March 2008 40	Walsall	1–1	Crewe Alexandra	Walsall
	Ian Roper 90+4'	Report	Nicky Maynard 61'	Stadium: Bescot Stadium; Attendance: 4,741; Referee: F Graham

29 March 2008 41	Luton Town	2–1	Crewe Alexandra	Luton
	Matthew Spring 4'; Matthew Spring (yellow card) 70' (Unsporting Behavior); Matthew Spring 78' (Pen.)	Report	Danny Woodards (yellow card) 47' (Unsporting Behavior); Michael O'Connor (yellow card) 53' (Unsporting Behavior); Nicky Maynard 58'	Stadium: Kenilworth Road; Attendance: 5,465; Referee: M Oliver

5 April 2008 42	Crewe Alexandra	1–3	Southend United	Crewe
	Nicky Maynard 74'	Report	Lee Barnard 2'; James Walker 19'; Charlie Mulgrew (yellow card) 38' (Unsporting Behavior); Simon Francis (yellow card) 77' (Unsporting Behavior); Lee Barnard 80'	Stadium: Gresty Road; Attendance: 4,895; Referee: A Haines

12 April 2008 43	Yeovil Town	0–3	Crewe Alexandra	Yeovil
	Marc Bircham (yellow card) 62' (Unsporting Behavior)	Report	Nicky Maynard 8'; Nicky Maynard 58'; Tom Pope 90'	Stadium: Huish Park; Attendance: 4,785; Referee: R Booth

19 April 2008 44	Crewe Alexandra	3–1	Cheltenham Town	Crewe
	Nicky Maynard 14'; Nicky Maynard 68'; Nicky Maynard 76'	Report	Alan Wright (yellow card) 60' (Unsporting Behavior); Steven Gillespie 62'	Stadium: Gresty Road; Attendance: 5,279; Referee: Andy D'Urso

26 April 2008 45	Bournemouth	1–0	Crewe Alexandra	Bournemouth
	Sam Vokes 55'; Lee Bradbury (yellow card) 80' (Unsporting Behavior)	Report		Stadium: Dean Court; Attendance: 8,621; Referee: Keith Hill

3 May 2008 46	Crewe Alexandra	1–4	Oldham Athletic	Crewe
	Roberts (yellow card) 70'; Jones 84'	Report	Smalley 5'; Eardley 32', 59'; Gregan (yellow card) 67'; McDonald 69'	Stadium: Gresty Road; Attendance: 6,786; Referee: Mike Russell

=== FA Cup ===
10 November 2007 First round	Crewe Alexandra	2–1	Milton Keynes Dons	Crewe
	Chris McCready 3'; Neil Cox 65'	Report	Gareth Edds (yellow card) 15' (Unsporting behaviour); Dean Lewington (yellow card) 60' (Unsporting behaviour); Jemal Johnson 69' (pen.)	Stadium: Gresty Road; Attendance: 3,049; Referee: K Hill

1 December 2007 Second round	Oldham Athletic	1–0	Crewe Alexandra	Oldham
	Lee Hughes 41'	Report		Stadium: Boundary Park; Attendance: 3,900; Referee: J Moss

=== League Cup ===
15 August 2007 First round	Crewe Alexandra	0–3	Hull City	Crewe
	G. S. Roberts (yellow card) 32' (Unsporting behaviour)	Report	Nathan Doyle (yellow card) 23' (Unsporting behavior); Michael Bridges 44'; Richard Garcia 55'; Stephen McPhee 70'	Stadium: Gresty Road; Attendance: 2,862; Referee: P Miller

=== Football League Trophy ===
4 September 2007 First round	Chester City	1–1 (4–3 p)	Crewe Alexandra	Chester
	Richie Partridge 61'; Kevin Ellison (yellow card) 90' (Unsporting behavior)	Report	Ryan Lowe 37'	Stadium: Deva Stadium; Attendance: 2,162; Referee: K Evans
	Penalties
	Paul Butler (penalty scored); Richie Partridge (penalty scored); Nathan Lowndes (penalty scored); James Vaughan (penalty missed); John Murphy (penalty scored)		Steven Schumacher (penalty scored); Billy Jones (penalty missed); Ryan Lowe (penalty scored); Julien Baudet (penalty missed); Eugen Bopp (penalty scored)

== Trivia ==
- Gillingham's Chris Dickson scored the winning goal against Crewe on 5 December at Gresty Road after spending one month on loan for the Railwaymen.
- Walsall's goalkeeper Clayton Ince received the November Powerade Player of the Month award just four days before playing against his former club. Ince, who spent six years at Crewe, said of the occasion, "...my feelings for the club will be put to one side for 90 minutes on Saturday." Ince kept a clean sheet in the match which resulted in a 0–0 draw.
- On 12 February, Crewe signed Ipswich Town midfielder Gary Roberts. Unusually, he is the second player with the name Gary Roberts at Crewe. He was assigned the shirt number 32, whilst the other Gary Roberts has the number 4 shirt.
- Ex-Crewe striker Luke Rodgers scored the final goal in the local derby against Port Vale, just as he did last season.
