= 2006–07 Crewe Alexandra F.C. season =

Crewe Alexandra
2006–07 season
- Chairman: John Bowler
- Manager: Dario Gradi
- Stadium: Gresty Road
- League One: 13th
- FA Cup: First round
- League Cup: Third round
- League Trophy: Northern area final

The 2006–07 season was the 130th season in the club's history, their 84th in the English Football League and first back in League One, the third tier of English football following their relegation from the Championship in the previous season. They finished 13th in League One on 60 points. They also competed in the FA Cup, Football League Cup and the Football League Trophy, where they were eliminated in the first round, third round and area final respectively.

== Players ==
As of end of season

Note: Flags indicate national team as defined under FIFA eligibility rules; some limited exceptions apply. Players may hold more than one non-FIFA nationality.

No.	Pos.	Nation	Player
1	GK	(England) ENG	Ben Williams
2	DF	(England) ENG	Jon Otsemobor
3	DF	(England) ENG	Billy Jones
4	MF	(England) ENG	Gary Roberts
5	DF	(France) FRA	Julien Baudet
6	DF	(England) ENG	Neil Cox
7	MF	(England) ENG	Anthony McNamee (on loan from Watford)
8	MF	(Northern Ireland) NIR	Michael O'Connor
10	MF	(England) ENG	Michael Higdon
11	MF	(Wales) WAL	David Vaughan
12	FW	(England) ENG	Luke Varney
13	GK	(England) ENG	Stuart Tomlinson
14	MF	(England) ENG	Ben Rix
15	DF	(England) ENG	Danny Woodards
16	FW	(England) ENG	Ryan Lowe
17	DF	(Wales) WAL	Darren Moss
18	FW	(England) ENG	Nicky Maynard
20	DF	(England) ENG	Paul Bignot

No.	Pos.	Nation	Player
21	DF	(England) ENG	Darran Kempson
22	GK	(Wales) WAL	Owain Fôn Williams
24	FW	(England) ENG	Mat Bailey
25	FW	(England) ENG	Tom Pope
26	DF	(England) ENG	Ritchie Sutton
27	FW	(Slovakia) SVK	Pavol Šuhaj
28	MF	(England) ENG	Mark Carrington
29	MF	(England) ENG	John Dillon
30	DF	(England) ENG	Adam Dugdale
32	FW	(England) ENG	Shaun Miller
33	FW	(England) ENG	Adam Warlow
34	DF	(England) ENG	Cavell Coo
35	MF	(Wales) WAL	Christopher Flynn
36	FW	(England) ENG	Rodney Jack
37	DF	(England) ENG	Danny O'Donnell (on loan from Liverpool)
38	FW	(England) ENG	Lee Matthews
41	FW	(England) ENG	Byron Moore

=== Left club during season ===
Note: Flags indicate national team as defined under FIFA eligibility rules; some limited exceptions apply. Players may hold more than one non-FIFA nationality.

No.	Pos.	Nation	Player
7	MF	(England) ENG	Tony Grant (joined Accrington Stanley in January 2007)
9	FW	(England) ENG	Luke Rodgers (joined Port Vale in January 2007)
15	MF	(England) ENG	Lee Bell (joined Burton Albion in January 2007)
19	DF	(England) ENG	Mark Roberts (joined Northwich Victoria in January 2007)
23	DF	(England) ENG	Robert Lloyd (joined Witton Albion in February 2007)

No.	Pos.	Nation	Player
31	DF	(England) ENG	Nathaniel Kerr (joined Rotherham United in 2006)
39	MF	(England) ENG	Isaac Osbourne (on loan from Coventry City)
39	DF	(France) FRA	Patrick Noubissié (joined Swindon Town in February 2007)
40	DF	(England) ENG	Andy Taylor (on loan from Blackburn Rovers)

== Competitions ==
=== Football League One ===
==== League table ====
Pos	Team	Pld	W	D	L	GF	GA	GD	Pts
11	Doncaster Rovers	46	16	15	15	52	47	+5	63
12	Port Vale	46	18	6	22	64	65	−1	60
13	Crewe Alexandra	46	17	9	20	66	72	−6	60
14	Northampton Town	46	15	14	17	48	51	−3	59
15	Huddersfield Town	46	14	17	15	60	69	−9	59

Rules for classification: In the Football League goals scored (GF) takes precedence over goal difference (GD).

==== Matches ====
Win	Draw	Loss

Date	Opponent	Venue	Result (Note: Crewe Alexandra's score shown first)	Scorers	Attendance	Ref.
5 August 2006	Northampton Town	Home	2–2	Lowe, Vaughan	5,553	
8 August 2006	Doncaster Rovers	Away	1–3	Maynard	6,081	
12 August 2006	Scunthorpe United	Away	2–2	Rodgers (pen.), Vaughan	4,329	
19 August 2006	Bradford City	Home	0–3	—	5,274	
27 August 2006	Brighton & Hove Albion	Away	4–1	Jones, Lowe, Maynard (2)	5,848	
2 September 2006	Huddersfield Town	Home	2–0	Maynard (2)	4,868	
9 September 2006	Bournemouth	Away	0–1	—	5,627	
12 September 2006	Cheltenham Town	Home	3–1	Maynard, Cox, Varney	4,062	
16 September 2006	Millwall	Home	1–0	Varney	4,875	
23 September 2006	Yeovil Town	Away	0–2	—	5,333	
26 September 2006	Swansea City	Away	1–2	Roberts (pen.)	10,031	
30 September 2006	Carlisle United	Home	5–1	Varney (2), Lowe (3)	5,989	
7 October 2006	Gillingham	Home	4–3	Maynard, Jack, O'Donnell, Varney	5,022	
14 October 2006	Bristol City	Away	1–2	Varney	11,899	
21 October 2006	Blackpool	Home	1–2	Maynard	5,765	
28 October 2006	Rotherham United	Away	1–5	Varney	5,407	
4 November 2006	Port Vale	Home	2–1	Maynard, Rodgers (pen.)	7,632	
18 November 2006	Brentford	Away	4–0	Varney (2), Rix, Vaughan	4,771	
25 November 2006	Chesterfield	Home	2–2	Varney, Rodgers	5,078	
5 December 2006	Oldham Athletic	Away	0–1	—	4,798	
9 December 2006	Nottingham Forest	Home	1–4	Roberts (pen.)	7,253	
23 December 2006	Leyton Orient	Away	1–1	Maynard	4,371	
26 December 2006	Swansea City	Home	1–3	Varney	6,083	
30 December 2006	Yeovil Town	Home	2–3	Maynard, Roberts	5,450	
2 January 2007	Cheltenham Town	Away	1–1	Varney	3,154	
13 January 2007	Bournemouth	Home	2–0	Varney, Maynard	4,739	
16 January 2007	Tranmere Rovers	Away	0–1	—	5,708	
20 January 2007	Carlisle United	Away	2–0	Baudet, Maynard	7,075	
27 January 2007	Leyton Orient	Home	0–4	—	5,280	
3 February 2007	Northampton Town	Away	2–1	Varney (2)	5,262	
17 February 2007	Bradford City	Away	1–0	Lowe	7,778	
20 February 2007	Doncaster Rovers	Home	2–1	Rix, Higdon	4,483	
24 February 2007	Huddersfield Town	Away	2–1	Higdon, Lowe	10,052	
27 February 2007	Scunthorpe United	Home	1–3	Varney	4,842	
3 March 2007	Brighton & Hove Albion	Home	1–1	Varney	5,202	
10 March 2007	Gillingham	Away	0–1	—	6,373	
13 March 2007	Millwall	Away	2–2	Higdon, Moss	8,867	
17 March 2007	Bristol City	Home	0–1	—	5,731	
24 March 2007	Rotherham United	Home	1–0	Moss	5,675	
31 March 2007	Blackpool	Away	1–2	Miller	7,203	
7 April 2007	Chesterfield	Away	1–2	Miller	3,698	
9 April 2007	Brentford	Home	3–1	Vaughan, Lowe, Maynard	4,667	
14 April 2007	Port Vale	Away	0–3	—	5,740	
21 April 2007	Oldham Athletic	Home	2–1	Maynard (2)	6,304	
28 April 2007	Tranmere Rovers	Home	1–1	Miller	5,777	
5 May 2007	Nottingham Forest	Away	0–0	—	27,472	

=== FA Cup ===
Win	Draw	Loss

Round	Date	Opponent	Venue	Result	Scorers	Attendance	Ref.
First round	11 November 2006	Bradford City	Away	0–4	—	3,483	

=== Football League Cup ===
Win	Draw	Loss

Round	Date	Opponent	Venue	Result	Scorers	Attendance	Ref.
First round	22 August 2006	Grimsby Town	Away	3–0	Maynard, O'Connor, Lowe (pen.)	1,635	
Second round	19 September 2006	Wigan Athletic	Home	2–0	Jack, Maynard	3,907	
Third round	25 October 2006	Manchester United	Home	1–2 (Note: After extra time)	Varney	10,046	

=== Football League Trophy ===
Win	Draw	Loss

Round	Date	Opponent	Venue	Result	Scorers	Attendance	Ref.
Second round	31 October 2006	Rochdale	Away	1–1 (Note: Crewe win 2–0 on penalties)	Varney	1,148	
Northern quarter-final	29 November 2006	Port Vale	Away	3–2	Lowe (pen.), Jack, Varney	4,694	
Northern semi-final	10 January 2007	Chesterfield	Away	4–2	Maynard, Varney (3)	3,414	
Northern final first leg	30 January 2007	Doncaster Rovers	Home	3–3	Moss, Lowe, Varney	4,631	
Northern final second leg	12 February 2007	Doncaster Rovers	Away	2–3 (Note: Doncaster win 6–5 on aggregate)	Varney, Lowe	12,561	
