= Ryan Lynch =

Ryan Lynch may refer to:

- Ryan Lynch (footballer) (born 1987), English football player
- Ryan Lynch (politician), American politician
- Ryan Lynch (racing driver) (born 1986), American race car driver
