= George Abbey (footballer) =

Nigerian footballer (born 1978)

Personal information
- Full name: George Peterson Abbey
- Date of birth: 20 October 1978 (age 48)
- Place of birth: Port Harcourt, Nigeria
- Height: 5 ft 8 in (1.73 m)
- Position: Defender

Youth career
- 1996–1999: Sharks F.C.

Senior career*
Years	Team	Apps	(Gls)
1999–2004	Macclesfield Town	100	(1)
2004–2007	Port Vale	62	(1)
2007–2009	Crewe Alexandra	30	(0)
2010–2011	Akritas Chlorakas	8	(0)
Total		200	(2)

International career
2003–2007	Nigeria	18	(0)
- * Club domestic league appearances and goals

George Peterson Abbey (born 20 October 1978) is a Nigerian former professional footballer who played as a defender.

Starting his career with Sharks, in 1999, he moved to England to play for Macclesfield Town. After five years at Town, he signed with Port Vale in December 2004. He moved on to Crewe Alexandra in the summer of 2007 and left the club after a two-year stay. In 2010, he moved to Cyprus to play for Akritas Chlorakas. He made 18 appearances for the Nigeria national team and was in the Nigeria squad for the third-place finish in the 2004 African Cup of Nations.

== Club career ==
Abbey was born to a Nigerian father and a Welsh mother. He grew up in the southern Nigerian city of Port Harcourt along with fellow footballer Joseph Yobo, who has remained his close friend since they both left the country.

After playing for Sharks F.C. in his hometown, he left for England and was signed up with Sammy McIlroy's Macclesfield Town in 1999. He played 18 games in the Third Division in 1999–2000. He featured 23 times in the 2000–01 campaign, and made 19 appearances under David Moss in 2001–02. He scored his first goal in the Football League on 15 April 2003, in a 3–2 win over Shrewsbury Town at Gay Meadow. Abbey played 24 games in 2002–03, as Macclesfield finished just six points clear of the relegation zone. He featured 30 times in the 2003–04 campaign, as he helped the "Silkmen" to finish three places and seven points above relegated Carlisle United. He played a total of 117 league and cup games for Macclesfield before being released by manager Brian Horton in the summer.

Abbey was reported to be looking to sign for a Premier League club, but instead he was signed up by League One side Port Vale in December 2004. He played 18 times in the 2004–05 season, helping Vale to avoid relegation into League Two by a five-point margin. He featured 22 times in the 2005–06 season. Abbey played 31 games in 2006–07, scoring in a 2–1 defeat to rivals Crewe Alexandra at Gresty Road on 4 November. He was released by manager Martin Foyle in May 2007.

He joined Crewe Alexandra at the end of July 2007. He featured 23 times for Steve Holland's "Railwaymen" in 2007–08, and signed a two-year contract at the end of the season. However, he played just seven times for new boss Guðjón Þórðarson, and agreed to have his contract terminated in May 2009. Abbey underwent a trial at Tranmere Rovers, playing in pre-season friendlies against Cammell Laird, Preston North End and Liverpool. However, due to Rovers financial difficulties, they were unable to offer Abbey a permanent contract.

In 2010, he joined Akritas Chlorakas in the Cypriot Second Division. He stayed for the 2010–11 season before retiring from football to become a fitness trainer.

== International career ==
Abbey was part of the Nigeria squad that participated in the 2004 Africa Cup of Nations held in Tunisia, thanks in part to a close relationship with Everton player Joseph Yobo, with whom he offered advice when deciding whether to move to Everton. The "Super Eagles" lost to Tunisia in the semi-finals before beating Mali 2–1 to claim third place. He was not called up to the 2006 Africa Cup of Nations, to his great disappointment.

== Career statistics ==
=== Club ===
Appearances and goals by club, season and competition
Club	Season	League			FA Cup		League Cup		Other		Total	
Club	Season	Division	Apps	Goals	Apps	Goals	Apps	Goals	Apps	Goals	Apps	Goals
Macclesfield Town	1999–2000	Third Division	18	0	2	0	1	0	0	0	21	0
Macclesfield Town	2000–01	Third Division	18	0	1	0	4	0	0	0	23	0
Macclesfield Town	2001–02	Third Division	17	0	1	0	0	0	1 (Note: Appearance(s) in the Football League Trophy.)	0	19	0
Macclesfield Town	2002–03	Third Division	22	1	2	0	0	0	0	0	24	1
Macclesfield Town	2003–04	Third Division	25	0	3	0	1	0	1	0	30	0
Macclesfield Town	2004–05	League Two	0	0	0	0	0	0	0	0	0	0
Macclesfield Town	Total		100	1	9	0	6	0	2	0	117	1
Port Vale	2004–05	League One	18	0	0	0	0	0	0	0	18	0
Port Vale	2005–06	League One	20	0	1	0	1	0	0	0	22	0
Port Vale	2006–07	League One	24	1	2	0	3	0	2	0	31	1
Port Vale	Total		62	1	3	0	4	0	2	0	71	1
Crewe Alexandra	2007–08	League One	23	0	0	0	0	0	0	0	23	0
Crewe Alexandra	2008–09	League One	7	0	0	0	0	0	0	0	7	0
Crewe Alexandra	Total		30	0	0	0	0	0	0	0	30	0
Akritas Chlorakas	2010–11	Cypriot Second Division	8	0	—		—		0	0	8	0
Career total			200	2	12	0	10	0	4	0	226	2

=== International ===
Appearances and goals by national team and year
National team	Year	Apps	Goals
Nigeria	2003	3	0
Nigeria	2004	11	0
Nigeria	2005	1	0
Nigeria	2006	2	0
Nigeria	2007	1	0
Total		18	0

== Honours ==
Nigeria

- Africa Cup of Nations third-place: 2004
