= Mark Carrington (footballer) =

English footballer

Personal information
- Full name: Mark Richard Carrington
- Date of birth: 4 May 1987 (age 39)
- Place of birth: Warrington, England
- Height: 1.83 m (6 ft 0 in)
- Position: Midfielder

Youth career
- –2006: Crewe Alexandra

Senior career*
Years	Team	Apps	(Gls)
2006–2009	Crewe Alexandra	29	(2)
2006	→ Leigh RMI (loan)	9	(0)
2006	→ Kidsgrove Athletic (loan)		
2009–2011	Milton Keynes Dons	32	(6)
2011	Hamilton Academical	12	(0)
2011–2013	Bury	48	(1)
2013–2021	Wrexham	241	(5)
2021–2022	Kidderminster Harriers	32	(2)
- * Club domestic league appearances and goals as of 00:50, 17 May 2022 (BST)

Mark Richard Carrington (born 4 May 1987) is an English former professional footballer. He primarily played as a central midfielder or a right back.

== Career ==
=== Crewe Alexandra ===
Born in Warrington, Cheshire, Carrington is a product of the renowned Crewe Alexandra youth system, joining their Academy at the age of 7. He represented Crewe at every age group level and played a key part in the under 18 team that reached the semi-finals of the F.A. Youth Cup in 2004.

During his third year scholarship at the club, Carrington was loaned out to Leigh RMI in the 2005–06 season, playing a holding midfield role and impressed enough to be awarded his first professional contract with Crewe in the summer of 2006.

In September 2006, Carrington went out on loan again when he joined Kidsgrove Athletic and made an impression that his loan spell was soon extended twice. Carrington had a successful loan spell at Kidsgrove Athletic, scoring 9 goals in 20 appearances from midfield, before being recalled by his parent club on 15 November 2006.

After returning from a loan spell at Kidsgrove Athletic, Carrington made his Crewe Alexandra debut on 28 April 2007, where he came on as a substitute in the 62nd minute, in a 3–0 loss against Port Vale. and broke into Crewe's first team towards the end of his first season as a professional. At the end of the 2006–07 season, Carrington signed a contract with the club.

Carrington made a handful of appearances the following season and saw a more regular place in the team with the arrival of new manager Guðjón Þórðarson in the 2008–09 season, and managed to score his first two goals for the club as a professional, in which his first goal came on 31 January 2009, in a 2–1 win over Tranmere Rovers. One of those goals being against his future club MK Dons in March 2009, and from that game Carrington earned praise from Steve Claridge in his Scouting Report for the Guardian. Having missed the last few games of the season with an injury, Carrington left the club when his contract expired in June 2009.

=== Milton Keynes Dons ===
On 21 July 2009, Paul Ince signed Mark Carrington on a two-year contract for Milton Keynes Dons.

After scoring in the pre-season friendly against Rushden & Diamonds, Carrington made his Milton Keynes Dons' debut in the opening game of the season, in a 0–0 draw against Hartlepool United and scored his first league goal for MK Dons against Colchester United two weeks on 22 August 2009. As the season progressed his game developed under the guidance of Ince, and although his starts were limited, he continued to impress when selected, and earned particular praise from the former England midfielder after scoring twice in the 3–1 win against Southend United on 20 February 2010. Carrington then scored his fourth goal for the club on 6 March 2010, in a 1–0 win over Leyton Orient and finished the 2009–10 season, making nineteen appearances and scoring two times.

With the replacement of Ince by Karl Robinson in the summer of 2010, and the arrival at MK of former England Assistant Manager John Gorman, Carrington continued to improve under John's guidance. Chances were limited however at the beginning of the season due to the signing of Dietmar Hamann. But the departure of Alex Rae to Notts County at the end of Oct 2010 saw Hamann move more into coaching, and Carrington featured in more games, helping Dons to their first away win of the season at Brentford in mid–November. Hamann quoted at the time 'one of the reason's for me taking a step back from playing was Mark Carrington's form, it was harsh leaving him out, so my move to coaching has given him a chance to play on a more regular basis and he has been excellent'. With a handful of first team appearances, Carrington scored his first Milton Keynes Dons' goal of the season, in a 4–1 loss against Sheffield Wednesday on 20 November 2010. However, with the return of Gleeson from injury, Carrington again found his chances limited and decided to leave MK Dons in the January transfer window, but not before scoring for them after coming on in the 81st minute against Dagenham & Redbridge to earn MK Dons a 1–0 win and three vital points towards their push for promotion. In a bid to play more regularly Carrington opted for a chance to play in the Scottish Premier League until the end of the season, where he put in some good performances against Celtic and Rangers.

=== Hamilton Academical ===
On 1 February 2011, Carrington joined Scottish club strugglers Hamilton Academical for four months until the end of the season, after leaving the Milton Keynes Dons by mutual consent. Upon joining the club, Carrington revealed he tried to persuade Milton Keynes Dons to release him despite their reluctance.

The next day, Carrington made his debut for Hamilton before coming off for Aaron Wildig in the 57th minute in a 2–0 loss against St Johnstone on 2 February 2011. Carrington made 11 more appearances for the club and was subsequently released by Hamilton following their relegation from the SPL.

=== Bury ===
After leaving Hamilton Academical, Carrington returned to England, where he joined Bury on trial and after three weeks with the club, Carrington joined on a short term non-contract deal after spending three weeks on trial with the club on 29 September 2011.

After signing for the club, Carrington suffered endured a frustrating period on the sidelines after developing a blood clot in his leg which delayed his debut.

Carrington had to wait until 17 December 2011 for his debut for the Shakers against Brentford in a 1–1 draw. His good performance at Bury after making three more appearances for Bury soon earned a deal until the end of the 2011–12 season. On 21 April 2012, Carrington scored his first goal for the club in a 4–2 win over Notts County. After making 21 appearances and scoring once in his first season, Carrington signed a new one-year contract with Bury which will keep until 2013.

At the start of the 2012–13 season, Carrington made his first start, playing in the defensive–midfield, in the opening game of the season, with a 0–0 draw against Brentford. Carrington managed to established himself in the first team in the 2012–13 season despite injuries. Carrington finished the season, making twenty–one appearances and at the end of the 2012–13 season, Carrington was among sixteen players to be released by the club following their relegation to League Two, as well as, their financial problems.

=== Wrexham ===
On 11 September 2013, Carrington signed on non-contract terms with Wrexham.

After appearing two matches as an unused substitute, Carrington finally made his debut for Wrexham in a league match away to Alfreton Town, coming on as a substitute on 86 minutes for Johnny Hunt, the reds lost 2–0 on 21 September 2013. His first start came the following Tuesday at the Racecourse Ground, in a 2–3 loss to Braintree Town. Carrington established himself in the first team, playing in the right–back position, throughout the season After 10 good performances for Wrexham, he signed a contract with the Dragons for the remainder of the 2013–14 campaign. Carrington then scored his first Wrexham goal in a 2–3 loss to Alfreton Town on Boxing Day 2013 and his second Wrexham goal later came on 19 March 2014, in a 2–0 win over Hereford United. Carrington went to finish 2013–14 season, making thirty–nine appearances and scoring two times in all competitions. At the end of season awards, Carrington was named as player of the season and signed a two–year contract with the club on 20 May 2014.

In the 2014–15 season, Carrington continued to established himself in the right–back position until on 9 September 2014, Carrington received a straight red card, in a 1–0 loss against Bristol Rovers. Though the club appealed for his suspension to be overturned, the appeal failed and Carrington served a three–match suspension. After serving a three–match suspension, Carrington made his first team return on 27 September 2014, in a 3–0 win over Eastleigh. On 11 October 2014, Carrington was at fault when he gave away a penalty and booked as a result, as Wrexham 1–0 against Grimsby Town. Carrington then scored his first Wrexham goal and set up one of the goals, in a 3–1 win over Aldershot Town on 29 November 2014. Then on 4 January 2015, Carrington scored again in the third round of FA Cup, in a 3–1 loss against Stoke City. However, Carrington suffered injuries during the season, including suffering from a groin injury that ruled him out for the remainder of the season. Despite this, Carrington finished the 2014–15 season, making thirty–three appearances and scoring two times in all competitions.

In the 2015–16 season saw Carrington continued to recover from a groin injury and made his first team return on 29 August 2015, coming on as a substitute in a late minute, in a 3–1 win over Halifax Town. Though he remained at the bench in handful of games since his return, Carrington scored his first Wrexham goal of the season to score only goal of the game, in a 1–0 win over Torquay United on 5 December 2015. On 26 January 2016, Carrington then received a red card after a second bookable offence, in a 1–0 loss against Braintree Town. After serving a match suspension, Carrington regained his first team place towards the end of the season and went on to make thirty–two appearances in the 2015–16 season. At the end of the 2015–16 season, Carrington was offered a new contract and signed a one–year contract with Wrexham on 13 May 2016.

In the opening game of the 2016–17 saw Carrington making his 100th league appearance for Wrexham, in a 0–0 draw against Dover Athletic. Carrington then scored his first Wrexham goal on 16 August 2016, in a 1–0 win over Solihull Moors. Carrington was released at the end of the 2020–2021 season after 8 years at The Racecourse.

=== Kidderminster Harriers ===
On 6 July 2021, it was announced that Carrington had signed for National League North club Kidderminster Harriers. Carrington scored his 1st goal against Chester in a 3–1 victory at Aggborough, a right footed strike from 30 yards out. It was confirmed following the 2021–22 season that Carrington would be retiring from football.

== Career statistics ==
As of matches played to 17 May 2022

Appearances and goals by club, season and competition
Club	Season	League			National Cup		League Cup		Other		Total	
Club	Season	Division	Apps	Goals	Apps	Goals	Apps	Goals	Apps	Goals	Apps	Goals
Crewe Alexandra	2005–06	Championship	0	0	0	0	0	0	—		0	0
Crewe Alexandra	2006–07	League One	3	0	0	0	0	0	0	0	3	0
Crewe Alexandra	2007–08	League One	9	0	0	0	1	0	1 (Note: Appearance(s) in Football League Trophy)	0	11	0
Crewe Alexandra	2008–09	League One	17	2	3	0	2	0	1	0	23	2
Crewe Alexandra	Total		29	2	3	0	3	0	2	0	37	2
Leigh RMI (loan)	2005–06	Conference North	9	0	—		—		—		9	0
Milton Keynes Dons	2009–10	League One	20	4	0	0	1	0	3	1	24	5
Milton Keynes Dons	2010–11	League One	12	2	2	0	3	0	1	0	18	2
Milton Keynes Dons	Total		32	6	2	0	4	0	4	1	42	7
Hamilton Academical	2010–11	Scottish Premier League	12	0	1	0	—		—		13	0
Bury	2011–12	League One	21	1	0	0	0	0	0	0	21	1
Bury	2012–13	League One	27	0	0	0	1	0	0	0	28	0
Bury	Total		48	1	0	0	1	0	0	0	49	1
Wrexham	2013–14	Conference Premier	37	2	3	0	—		2 (Note: Appearance(s) in FA Trophy)	0	42	2
Wrexham	2014–15	Conference Premier	30	1	5	1	—		8	0	43	2
Wrexham	2015–16	National League	32	1	1	0	—		2	0	35	1
Wrexham	2016–17	National League	44	1	2	0	—		1	0	47	1
Wrexham	2017–18	National League	26	0	1	0	—		1	0	28	0
Wrexham	2018–19	National League	29	0	4	0	—		3 (Note: Two appearances in FA Trophy, one appearance in National League play-offs)	0	36	0
Wrexham	2019–20	National League	24	0	2	0	–		0	0	26	0
Wrexham	2020–21	National League	17	0	0	0	–		1	0	18	0
Wrexham	Total		241	5	18	1	—		19	0	274	6
Kidderminster Harriers	2021–22	National League North	32	2	7	0	—		0	0	39	2
Career total			383	16	31	1	8	0	24	1	446	18

== Honours ==
Wrexham

- FA Trophy runner-up: 2014–15

Daten Vets 2022-2023 Cheshire Veterans Division 4 Champion
