= Chris McCready =

English footballer

Personal information
- Full name: Christopher James McCready
- Date of birth: 5 September 1981 (age 45)
- Place of birth: Ellesmere Port, England
- Position: Defender

Senior career*
Years	Team	Apps	(Gls)
2000–2006	Crewe Alexandra	76	(0)
2000-2001	→ Hyde United (loan)	8	(0)
2006–2007	Tranmere Rovers	42	(1)
2007–2009	Crewe Alexandra	39	(2)
2009–2010	Northampton Town	14	(0)
2010	→ Tranmere Rovers (loan)	8	(0)
2010–2014	Morecambe	142	(6)
Total		327	(9)
- * Club domestic league appearances and goals as of 06:08, 30 January 2017 (UTC)

Christopher James McCready (born 5 September 1981) is an English former footballer. He played in right, left and central defence.

== Career ==
Prior to joining Tranmere in 2006, McCready had spent his entire professional career at Crewe, joining the club as a schoolboy and graduating through its prolific youth system. At the age of 14, McCready went to the FA national school at Lilleshall where he played with peers including Joe Cole, he also represented England schoolboys through to under 17 level. McCready made over 70 appearances for Crewe, as well as making eight appearances on loan at Hyde United over two separate spells.

He rejected the offer of a new contract at the end of the 2005–06 season following the club's relegation from the Championship, and joined Tranmere on a one-year contract for 2006–07, after impressing on trial.

McCready established himself as a regular in the Rovers defence, playing in all but four of Tranmere's league games. He re-joined Crewe on a two-year contract on 7 June 2007. At the end of that two-year spell, he was told that he would not be offered a new contract at Crewe, so was released by the club. He joined Northampton on 3 August, after a successful trial.

In January 2010 he rejoined Tranmere Rovers on loan for the remainder of the season.

On 27 July 2010 he signed a for Morecambe on a two-year deal.

In September 2013, he fractured his collarbone in a match against Plymouth Argyle. In May 2014, it was announced that he wasn't to be offered a new contract by Morecambe, and would be released at the end of the season.

== Career statistics ==
Appearances and goals by club, season and competition
Club	Season	League			FA Cup		League Cup		Other		Total	
Club	Season	Division	Apps	Goals	Apps	Goals	Apps	Goals	Apps	Goals	Apps	Goals
Crewe Alexandra	2001–02	First Division	1	0	0	0	0	0	0	0	1	0
Crewe Alexandra	2002–03	Second Division	8	0	0	0	1	0	0	0	9	0
Crewe Alexandra	2003–04	First Division	22	0	0	0	1	0	0	0	23	0
Crewe Alexandra	2004–05	Championship	20	0	1	0	0	0	0	0	21	0
Crewe Alexandra	2005–06	Championship	25	0	1	0	0	0	0	0	26	0
Crewe Alexandra	Total		76	0	2	0	2	0	0	0	80	0
Tranmere Rovers	2006–07	League One	42	1	2	0	1	0	2 (Note: Appearances in the Football League Trophy)	0	47	1
Crewe Alexandra	2007–08	League One	34	1	2	1	1	0	0	0	37	2
Crewe Alexandra	2008–09	League One	5	1	0	0	1	0	0	0	6	1
Crewe Alexandra	Total		39	2	2	1	2	0	0	0	43	3
Northampton Town	2009–10	League Two	14	0	0	0	1	0	3	0	18	0
Tranmere Rovers (loan)	2009–10	League One	8	0	0	0	0	0	0	0	8	0
Morecambe	2010–11	League Two	36	4	1	0	2	0	0	0	39	4
Morecambe	2011–12	League Two	46	0	1	0	1	0	0	0	48	0
Morecambe	2012–13	League Two	40	2	2	0	1	0	2	0	45	2
Morecambe	2013–14	League Two	22	0	1	0	0	0	0	0	23	0
Morecambe	Total		144	6	5	0	4	0	2	0	155	6
Career total			323	9	11	1	9	0	7	0	350	10

== Personal life ==
His younger brother Tom is also a professional footballer and has played for a range of clubs, including Exeter City and Chester. He has three children.
