= Owain Fôn Williams =

Welsh footballer (born 1987)

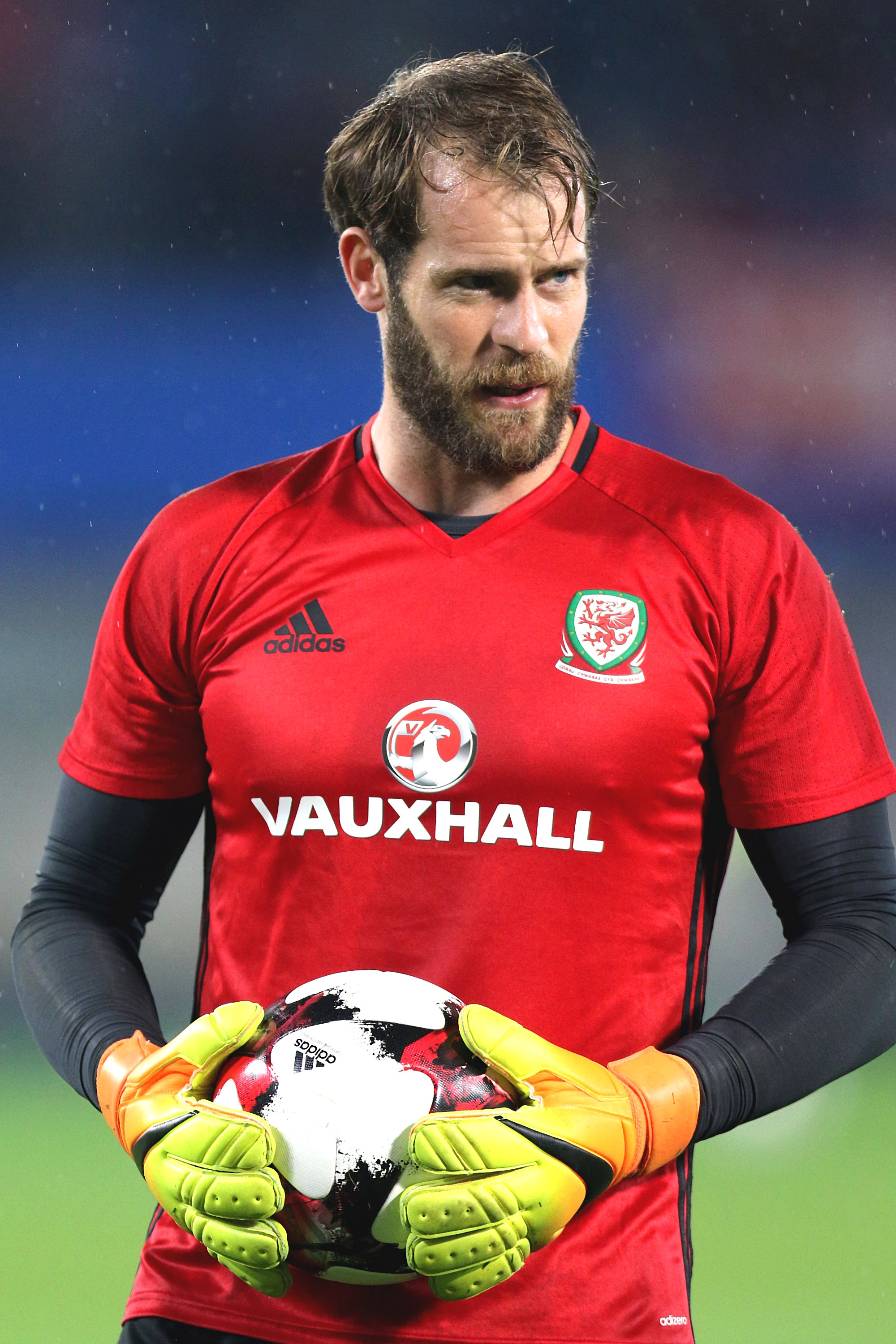
- Williams with Wales in 2016

Personal information
- Full name: Owain Fôn Williams
- Date of birth: 17 March 1987 (age 39)
- Place of birth: Penygroes, Wales
- Height: 6 ft 4 in (1.93 m)
- Position: Goalkeeper

Team information
- Current team: Bolton Wanderers (Head of goalkeeping)

Youth career
- 2003–2006: Crewe Alexandra

Senior career*
Years	Team	Apps	(Gls)
2006–2008	Crewe Alexandra	0	(0)
2008–2011	Stockport County	82	(0)
2010–2011	→ Bury (loan)	6	(0)
2011	Rochdale	22	(0)
2011–2015	Tranmere Rovers	161	(0)
2015–2019	Inverness Caledonian Thistle	71	(0)
2018	→ Indy Eleven (loan)	34	(0)
2019–2020	Hamilton Academical	15	(0)
2020	→ Dunfermline Athletic (loan)	6	(0)
2020–2022	Dunfermline Athletic	46	(0)
Total		443	(0)

International career
2003	Wales U17	1	(0)
2004–2006	Wales U19	4	(0)
2007–2008	Wales U21	11	(0)
2015	Wales	1	(0)

Managerial career
- 2022: Northern Colorado Hailstorm (goalkeeping coach)
- 2022–2025: Fleetwood Town (goalkeeping coach)
- 2025–: Bolton Wanderers (Head of Goalkeeping)
Medal record
Men's football
Representing Wales
UEFA European Championship
Bronze medal – third place	2016 France
- * Club domestic league appearances and goals

Owain Fôn Williams (born 17 March 1987) is a Welsh professional football coach and former professional footballer who is the head of goalkeeping for EFL Championship side Bolton Wanderers.

Williams played as a goalkeeper making 271 appearances in the English Football League, including 161 for Tranmere Rovers, also representing Crewe Alexandra, Stockport County, Bury, and Rochdale. He then played for Scottish clubs Inverness Caledonian Thistle, Hamilton Academical and Dunfermline Athletic, and in the United States for Indy Eleven.

Formerly a Welsh youth international, he was first called up to the senior Wales team in 2009, finally making his debut in 2015. He was a member of the Wales squad that reached the semi-finals of UEFA Euro 2016.

== Early life ==
Williams was born and raised in Penygroes, Gwynedd. He attended Ysgol Dyffryn Nantlle.

== Club career ==
=== Crewe Alexandra ===
Williams joined Crewe Alexandra after impressing during a trial period when he had his spells at Premier League clubs Manchester United and Liverpool and was signed on scholarship forms in 2003. He was first choice for the club's under-19 team but suffered a broken leg during his second year which halted his progress. On 19 June 2006, Williams signed a two-year contract with the club.

Following his recovery, Williams was given the number twenty-one shirt and competed for the first choice goalkeeper with Ben Williams, but failed to start and spent most of the season on the substitute bench. Tired of the lack of first team appearances, Williams was offered a new contract, but the negotiations stalled and Williams left Crewe in July 2008 for a tribunal-set fee.

=== Stockport County ===
On 8 July 2008, he joined Stockport County following the expiration of his contract with Crewe. Williams was linked with a move to Premier League clubs and Championship clubs before joining Stockport County.

After making his debut in a 1–1 draw with Huddersfield Town on the opening day of the 2008–09 season, Williams soon established himself as County's No.1, however in October 2008, he lost his first team place to on-loan keeper Fraser Forster. Forster was kept in goal for six games throughout October and into early November before his loan spell expired and Williams returned to his Number One slot. Until the middle of March, Williams was ever present for County, putting in match winning performances. On 30 March, Williams underwent an operation on his shoulder which kept him out for the remainder of the 2008–09 season. Despite making thirty-three appearances, Williams, nevertheless, was awarded Stockport County's Player of the Year. His performance saw also him being linked with a move to Premier League side Blackburn Rovers and Newcastle United and the club may sell him, as they faced financial problems.

In the 2009–10 season, Williams made his return from injury in a friendly match, with a 5–0 win over Nostell Miners Welfare on 18 July 2009. After being featured as a first choice goalkeeper for the rest of the friendly matches, Williams made his league return from injury, in the opening game of the season, in a 0–0 draw against Oldham Athletic, where he made a string of saves. After the match, Manager Gary Ablett praised his performance. However, the club struggled in the league and record twelve games without a point between 17 October 2009 and 19 January 2010. This was later ended in the next game when the club drew 0–0 against Carlisle United and the game also saw Williams making a string of saves, including saving a shot from Adam Clayton's 30-yard drive. Despite Williams' best efforts, the club were later relegated from League One.

As the club were relegated from League One, Williams was available to leave the club on a free transfer. However, the club's attempts to let Williams leave the club in the summer failed and allowed him to leave the club. Williams went on to make seven appearances in the 2010–11 season and was mostly on the substitution bench after losing his first choice to newly signing Matt Glennon.

=== Bury and Rochdale ===
On 28 October 2010, Williams joined local rivals Bury on a two-month-long emergency loan deal to replace the injured Cameron Belford. Williams made his Bury debut on 30 October 2010, in a 3–1 win over Aldershot Town. After making seven appearances for Bury, Williams returned to Stockport on 4 January 2011 after completion of his loan period.

On 20 January 2011, Williams joined another local rival, Rochdale, signing until the end of the season and he made his debut on 22 January as his new side beat Yeovil Town. Williams made 22 appearances for Rochdale as they finished the season in 7th place. He was released at the end of the season.

=== Tranmere Rovers ===
At the end of June 2011, sports media in the UK reported he was due to join Tranmere Rovers on a permanent contract. This was confirmed by Tranmere on 1 July 2011, where he signed up on a two-year contract.

Despite suffering a thigh injury in the pre-season friendly, Williams made his competitive club debut on the first day of the 2011–12 season, starting the Football League match against Chesterfield. Tranmere Rovers won 1–0 and kept a clean sheet on his debut Three weeks later on 31 August 2011, Williams helped the club go through to the next round of Johnstone's Trophy after Tranmere Rovers beat Port Vale in the penalty-shootout, with Williams saved one of the two penalties. Williams established himself as a first choice goalkeeper at Tranmere Rovers and his impressive display led him being praised by Manager Les Parry. However, Williams suffered a hand injury in training, resulted him having a surgery, which saw him sidelined for eight weeks. After months on the sidelines, Williams made his first team return on 4 February 2012, in a 2–1 loss against Wycombe Wanderers. Williams was sent-off in the 72nd minute after fouling Ryan Noble in the box, in a 1–1 draw against Hartlepool United on 21 April 2012. In his first season at Tranmere Rovers, Williams made thirty-five appearances for the club.

In the 2012–13 season, Williams continued to be the first choice goalkeeper and made forty-five appearances for the club this season, earning a call-up to the Welsh squad for a fixture against Scotland. Upon discovering that he would not start the game, he returned to Tranmere Rovers line-up less than 24 hours after sitting on the national side's substitutes bench and played in a 3–2 win over Yeovil Town on 13 October 2012. By the end of October, Williams made a good display, where he conceded fourteen goals in fifteen games and kept a clean sheet at least six times. During a period of heavy snowfall in January 2013, an away fixture at Brentford was briefly stopped as Williams was pelted by snowballs thrown from the home supporters. At the end of the 2012–13 season, Williams was offered a new contract by the club. Williams turned down a move to the Championship in favour of signing a two-year contract extension at the club.

In the 2013–14 season, Williams suffered a knee injury in a pre-season friendly, but made his recovery soon after. Weeks later on 27 August 2013, Williams was the hero in the penalty shoot-out against Bolton Wanderers in the second round of League Cup after saving two penalties from André Moritz and Alex Baptiste following a 1–1 draw that last through 120 minutes. By the first half of the season, Williams made twenty-one out of twenty-three appearances because of his international commitment. Despite this, Williams' continued to impress and was nominated for Sky Bet League 1 Player of the Month award for February as a result of his good performance. However, the club find themselves in the relegation zone, with their League One status for next season was under threat. After being booked in a match against Leyton Orient on 26 April 2014, Williams missed the match on the final day of the season a home defeat against Bradford City and results elsewhere meant they were relegated to League Two. Following the club's relegation, Williams' relegation clause was activated, allowing him to leave the club.

In the 2014–15 season, Williams remained at the club, as they played in League Two. Williams continued to be first-choice goalkeeper throughout the season, despite missing nine matches due to international commitment.

In May 2015, following Tranmere's relegation to the Conference Premier, Williams was released, ending his four-year association with the club. He stated that he would consider a move abroad if a suitable club showed interest.

=== Inverness Caledonian Thistle ===
After his release from Tranmere, Williams signed for Scottish Premiership side Inverness Caledonian Thistle on 16 July 2015. He made his debut later that day, in a 0–1 home defeat to Astra Giurgiu of Romania in UEFA Europa League qualification. His league debut came on 1 August, as the team began their season with a 0–1 home loss to Motherwell in which he saved a penalty from Scott McDonald. Williams played in all 38 league matches during the 2015–16 Scottish Premiership season. In May 2016, he signed a three-year contract with Inverness.

==== Indy Eleven (loan) ====
On 1 February 2018, United Soccer League club Indy Eleven announced the signing of Williams on loan for the 2018 season, where he went on to earn player of the season.

=== Hamilton Academical ===
He signed for Hamilton Academical in June 2019.

=== Dunfermline Athletic ===
Williams was loaned to Scottish Championship club Dunfermline Athletic in January 2020, playing in 6 matches before the season was halted due to the COVID-19 pandemic. On 3 August 2020, he signed for Dunfermline Athletic permanently on a two-year deal. On 28 February 2022, Fôn Williams had his contract at Dunfermline cancelled due to family reasons.

== International career ==
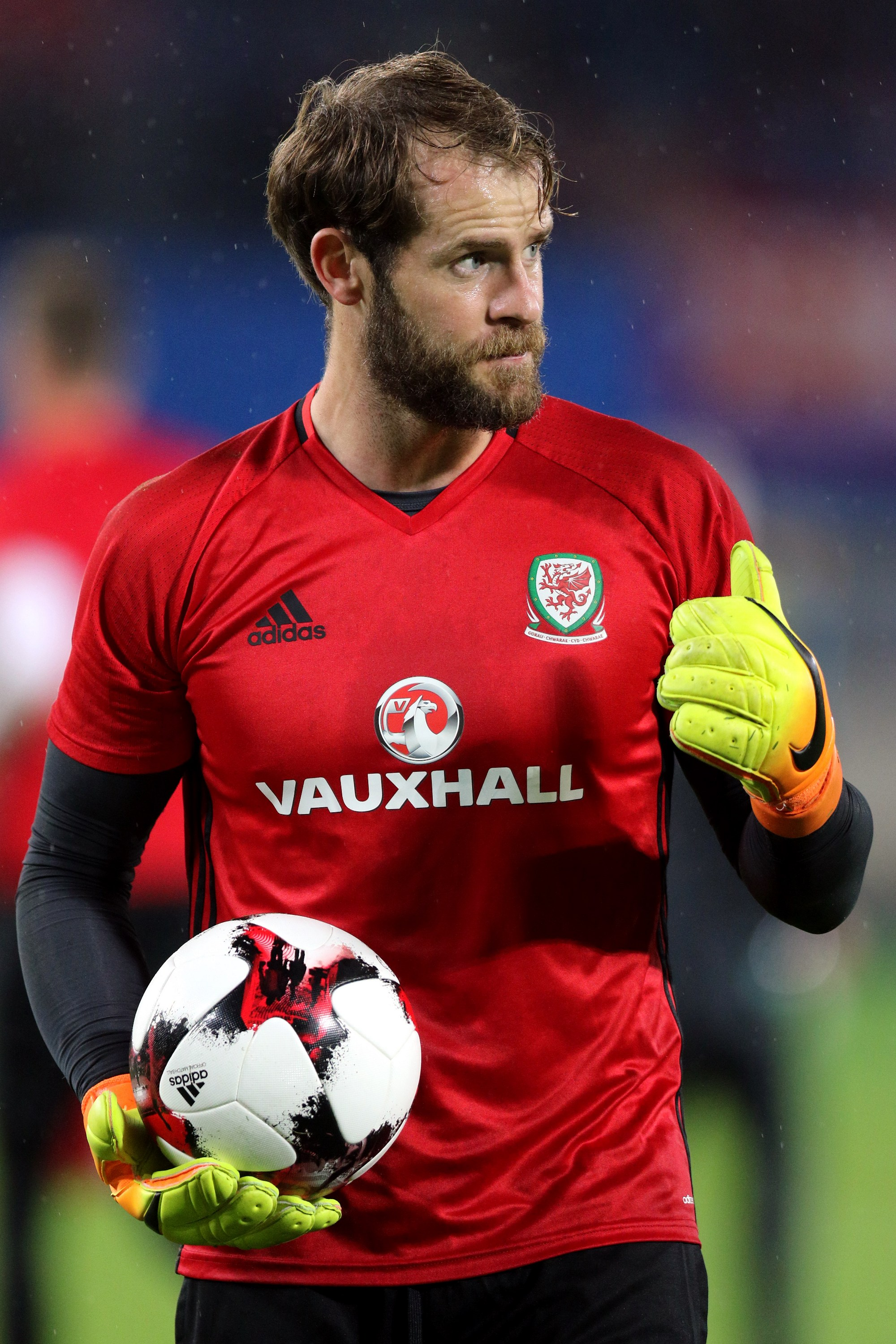
Williams with Wales in 2016

After being called up by Wales under-17, Williams made his one and only appearance for the Wales under-17 side on 8 November 2003, as a substitute to replace Wayne Hennessey during a 4–0 win over Azerbaijan in a UEFA European Under-17 Championship qualifying match.

After a handful of appearances for the under-19 side, Williams moved up to the Wales under-21 side, making his debut in a 4–0 friendly win against Northern Ireland. He took over as the team's number one goalkeeper and missed just one match in the qualifying round of the 2009 UEFA European Under-21 Championship as they finished top of their group before being beaten by England in the play-off.

In February 2009, Williams earned his first call up to the senior Wales squad for the match with Poland in Portugal and was called up a second time the following month for the qualifiers with Finland and Germany. He remained a regular back-up goalkeeper in the following years, including in their successful UEFA Euro 2016 qualifying campaign. He finally made his debut on 13 November 2015 in a friendly against the Netherlands at Cardiff City Stadium, replacing Wayne Hennessey with 16 minutes to play and the score at 2–2, and conceded the winning goal from Arjen Robben. In 2016, he was named in Wales' 23-man squad for UEFA Euro 2016.

== Coaching career ==
On 15 April 2022, Williams was named goalkeeping coach for USL League One side Northern Colorado Hailstorm FC. On 14 July the same year, he took the same post at EFL League One club Fleetwood Town. In June 2025, he moved to Bolton Wanderers as head of goalkeeping.

== Personal life ==
Williams is a fine art painter, with his works being displayed in the National Library of Wales.

== Career statistics ==
Appearances and goals by club, season and competition
Club	Season	League			National Cup		League Cup		Other		Total	
Club	Season	Division	Apps	Goals	Apps	Goals	Apps	Goals	Apps	Goals	Apps	Goals
Crewe Alexandra	2005–06	Championship	0	0	0	0	0	0	0	0	0	0
Crewe Alexandra	2006–07	League One	0	0	0	0	0	0	0	0	0	0
Crewe Alexandra	2007–08	League One	0	0	0	0	0	0	0	0	0	0
Crewe Alexandra	Total		0	0	0	0	0	0	0	0	0	0
Stockport County	2008–09	League One	33	0	4	0	1	0	1 (Note: Appearance(s) in Football League Trophy)	0	39	0
Stockport County	2009–10	League One	44	0	2	0	0	0	0	0	46	0
Stockport County	2010–11	League Two	5	0	—		1	0	0	0	6	0
Stockport County	Total		82	0	6	0	2	0	1	0	91	0
Bury (loan)	2010–11	League Two	6	0	2	0	—		0	0	8	0
Rochdale	2010–11	League One	22	0	—		—		0	0	22	0
Tranmere Rovers	2011–12	League One	35	0	1	0	1	0	3	0	40	0
Tranmere Rovers	2012–13	League One	45	0	3	0	2	0	1	0	51	0
Tranmere Rovers	2013–14	League One	43	0	2	0	3	0	1	0	49	0
Tranmere Rovers	2014–15	League Two	38	0	4	0	1	0	1	0	44	0
Tranmere Rovers	Total		161	0	10	0	7	0	6	0	184	0
Inverness Caledonian Thistle	2015–16	Scottish Premiership	38	0	5	0	2	0	1 (Note: Appearance(s) in UEFA Europa League)	0	46	0
Inverness Caledonian Thistle	2016–17	Scottish Premiership	31	0	2	0	2	0	—		35	0
Inverness Caledonian Thistle	2017–18	Scottish Championship	2	0	0	0	0	0	1 (Note: Appearance in the Scottish Challenge Cup)	0	3	0
Inverness Caledonian Thistle	2018–19	Scottish Championship	0	0	0	0	0	0	0	0	0	0
Inverness Caledonian Thistle	Total		71	0	7	0	4	0	3	0	84	0
Indy Eleven (loan)	2018	United Soccer League	34	0	1	0	—		1 (Note: Appearance in the USL Playoffs)	0	36	0
Hamilton Academical	2019–20	Scottish Premiership	15	0	1	0	5	0	—		21	0
Dunfermline Athletic (loan)	2019–20	Scottish Championship	6	0	0	0	0	0	0	0	6	0
Dunfermline Athletic	2020–21	Scottish Championship	26	0	1	0	4	0	2 (Note: Appearances in the Scottish Premiership Playoffs)	0	33	0
Dunfermline Athletic	2021–22	Scottish Championship	20	0	1	0	2	0	0	0	23	0
Dunfermline Athletic	Total		52	0	2	0	6	0	2	0	62	0
Career total			443	0	29	0	24	0	12	0	508	0

== Honours ==
Individual

- Stockport County Player of the Year: 2008–09
