= Billy Jones (footballer, born 1983) =

English footballer

Personal information
- Full name: William Kenneth Jones
- Date of birth: 26 June 1983 (age 43)
- Place of birth: Chatham, England
- Height: 6 ft 1 in (1.85 m)
- Position: Left back

Team information
- Current team: Bearsted

Senior career*
| Years | Team | Apps | (Gls) |
| 2000–2004 | Leyton Orient | 72 | (0) |
| 2004–2005 | Kidderminster Harriers | 12 | (0) |
| 2005–2007 | Exeter City | 86 | (17) |
| 2007–2010 | Crewe Alexandra | 71 | (8) |
| 2010–2012 | Exeter City | 48 | (1) |
| 2012–2013 | Cheltenham Town | 39 | (0) |
| 2013–2014 | Newport County | 6 | (1) |
| 2014–2016 | Gloucester City | 91 | (12) |
| 2015–2016 | Harlow Town | 5 | (0) |
| 2016–2017 | Cheshunt | | |
| 2017 | Bowers & Pitsea | 7 | (1) |
| 2017 | Harlow Town | 4 | (0) |
| 2017– | Bearsted | | |

International career
| 2007 | England C | 1 | (0) |
- * Club domestic league appearances and goals as of 11 April 2017 (UTC)

William Kenneth Jones (born 26 June 1983) is an English football defender who plays for Bearsted.

His league debut came for Orient, in January 2001, when he was just 17. Over the next four seasons he played 79 games for the club, moving to Kidderminster Harriers in January 2005. However, Kidderminster were relegated from the Football League, and Jones moved to Exeter at the end of the season.

Jones followed former teammate Danny Woodards to League One club Crewe Alexandra for £65,000 on a three-year deal. on 30 May 2007. Jones will become Crewe's second signing of the season from a non-league club.

On 11 June 2010, Jones agreed to re-sign for Exeter City after passing a medical. He was Exeter's first signing of the 2005 pre-season, re-uniting him with Alex Inglethorpe, whom he had worked with during his time in Leyton Orient's youth setup.

On 11 July 2012, Jones signed for Cheltenham Town on a two-year deal.

On 12 September 2013 Jones joined Newport County on a monthly contract as cover for the injured Andy Sandell. Jones made his debut for Newport County versus Morecambe on 14 September 2013 and scored within two minutes of kick-off. He was released by Newport in January 2014 and subsequently joined Gloucester City.

Jones signed for Harlow Town on 19 May 2016.
