= Danny Woodards =

English footballer (born 1983)

Personal information
- Full name: Daniel Mark Woodards
- Date of birth: 8 October 1983 (age 43)
- Place of birth: Forest Gate, England
- Height: 5 ft 11 in (1.80 m)
- Positions: Defender; midfielder

Youth career
- ?–2003: Chelsea

Senior career*
| Years | Team | Apps | (Gls) |
| 2003–2005 | Chelsea | 0 | (0) |
| 2005–2007 | Exeter City | 49 | (0) |
| 2007–2009 | Crewe Alexandra | 84 | (0) |
| 2009–2011 | Milton Keynes Dons | 66 | (1) |
| 2011–2014 | Bristol Rovers | 70 | (4) |
| 2014–2015 | Tranmere Rovers | 5 | (0) |
| 2015–2021 | Boreham Wood | 146 | (3) |
| Total | | 420 | (8) |

International career
| 2005 | England C | 1 | (0) |
- * Club domestic league appearances and goals as of 14:24, 21 July 2023 (UTC)

Daniel Mark Woodards (born 8 October 1983) is an English former footballer who played as a defender. He previously played in the Football League for Crewe Alexandra, Milton Keynes Dons, Bristol Rovers and Tranmere Rovers.

== Club career ==
=== Early career ===
Woodards was born in Forest Gate, London. He began his career as a trainee with Chelsea, playing 70 times plus 10 substitute appearances (scoring 8 goals) for the reserve team in the period 2000–01 to 2004–05, but was released during the summer of 2005 without making a senior appearance for the club.

=== Exeter City ===
After spending a short time on trial with League Two club Wycombe Wanderers, he signed on non-contract terms for Conference National club Exeter City on 29 October 2005. Woodards was able to impress manager Alex Inglethorpe enough to secure a contract through the 2006–07 season.

During his time with Exeter, Woodards proved himself to be a versatile and talented player. Able to play both as a right-back and right-sided winger, he quickly established himself as Exeter's first choice right-back.

=== Crewe Alexandra ===
After rejecting a series of new contracts from Exeter during the 2006–07 season, Woodards had a trial with League One club Yeovil Town during the January transfer window. Glovers manager Russell Slade was reportedly interested in signing the English defender, but it was Dario Gradi of fellow League One side Crewe Alexandra who managed to sign Woodards for a fee of £30,000 and a 20% sell-on clause.

=== MK Dons ===
He signed a two-year deal at MK Dons after his contract expired. He was released at the end of the 2010–11 season after turning down a new contract. His only goal for MK Dons came in a 2–1 win at Walsall on 7 August 2010.

=== Bristol Rovers ===
On 26 August 2011, Woodards joined recently relegated League Two side Bristol Rovers on an initial one-year deal with the option for a further twelve months. Following a strong first season for the club, he was named Player of the Year at the club's end of season awards. In July 2012, he signed a new contract having had his extension option activated.

Having suffered a broken leg on the final day of the 2011–12 season, Woodards only made his return to first-team action in November 2012. In April 2013, he faced another injury setback, suffering an Anterior cruciate ligament injury in a 4–1 defeat to Bradford City, feared to rule him out for up to nine months.

Following relegation to the Football Conference, Woodards was one of twelve players to be released by the club.

=== Tranmere Rovers ===
After a successful trial at Tranmere, Woodards signed on an initial six-month deal on 28 July 2014 and was allocated squad number 17.

=== Boreham Wood ===
After leaving Tranmere, Woodards signed for newly promoted National League club Boreham Wood in July 2015. Woodards was released by the club at the end of the 2020–21 season.

== Personal life ==
In July 2012, Woodards' brother Liam was stabbed to death at Westfield Stratford City.

== Career statistics ==
As of 1 July 2021

Appearances and goals by club, season and competition
| Club | Season | League | | | FA Cup | | League Cup | | Other | | Total | |
| Club | Season | Division | Apps | Goals | Apps | Goals | Apps | Goals | Apps | Goals | Apps | Goals |
|---|---|---|---|---|---|---|---|---|---|---|---|---|
| Exeter City | 2005–06 | Conference Premier | 27 | 0 | 0 | 0 | — | | 6 (Note: Appearances in FA Trophy) | 0 | 33 | 0 |
| Exeter City | 2006–07 | Conference Premier | 22 | 0 | 2 | 0 | — | | 1 | 0 | 25 | 0 |
| Exeter City | Total | | 49 | 0 | 2 | 0 | — | | 7 | 0 | 58 | 0 |
| Crewe Alexandra | 2006–07 | League One | 11 | 0 | — | | — | | — | | 11 | 0 |
| Crewe Alexandra | 2007–08 | League One | 36 | 0 | 2 | 0 | 1 | 0 | 1 (Note: Appearances in Football League Trophy) | 0 | 40 | 0 |
| Crewe Alexandra | 2008–09 | League One | 37 | 0 | 1 | 0 | 3 | 0 | 2 | 0 | 43 | 0 |
| Crewe Alexandra | Total | | 84 | 0 | 3 | 0 | 4 | 0 | 3 | 0 | 94 | 0 |
| MK Dons | 2009–10 | League One | 29 | 0 | 2 | 0 | 1 | 0 | 4 | 0 | 36 | 0 |
| MK Dons | 2010–11 | League One | 37 | 1 | 2 | 0 | 3 | 0 | 1 | 0 | 43 | 1 |
| MK Dons | Total | | 66 | 1 | 4 | 0 | 4 | 0 | 5 | 0 | 79 | 1 |
| Bristol Rovers | 2011–12 | League Two | 39 | 1 | 3 | 1 | 1 | 0 | 1 | 0 | 44 | 2 |
| Bristol Rovers | 2012–13 | League Two | 22 | 2 | 0 | 0 | 0 | 0 | 0 | 0 | 22 | 2 |
| Bristol Rovers | 2013–14 | League Two | 9 | 1 | 1 | 0 | 0 | 0 | 0 | 0 | 10 | 1 |
| Bristol Rovers | Total | | 70 | 4 | 4 | 1 | 1 | 0 | 1 | 0 | 76 | 5 |
| Tranmere Rovers | 2014–15 | League Two | 5 | 0 | 0 | 0 | 1 | 0 | 0 | 0 | 6 | 0 |
| Boreham Wood | 2015–16 | National League | 39 | 0 | 2 | 0 | — | | 0 | 0 | 41 | 0 |
| Boreham Wood | 2016–17 | National League | 31 | 2 | 2 | 0 | — | | 5 | 0 | 38 | 2 |
| Boreham Wood | 2017–18 | National League | 32 | 1 | 2 | 0 | — | | 6 (Note: Three appearances in FA Trophy, three in National League play-offs) | 0 | 40 | 1 |
| Boreham Wood | 2018–19 | National League | 29 | 0 | 1 | 0 | — | | 1 | 0 | 31 | 0 |
| Boreham Wood | 2019–20 | National League | 11 | 0 | 0 | 0 | — | | 0 | 0 | 11 | 0 |
| Boreham Wood | 2020–21 | National League | 4 | 0 | 0 | 0 | — | | 0 | 0 | 4 | 0 |
| Boreham Wood | Total | | 146 | 3 | 7 | 0 | — | | 12 | 0 | 165 | 3 |
| Career total | | | 420 | 8 | 20 | 1 | 10 | 0 | 28 | 0 | 478 | 9 |
