= Dan Woodards =

English footballer

Personal information
- Full name: Daniel James Woodards
- Date of birth: 18 November 1886
- Place of birth: East Ham, London, England
- Date of death: 14 December 1964 (aged 78)
- Place of death: Hillingdon, London, England
- Height: 5 ft 9 in (1.75 m)
- Position: Wing-half

Youth career
- East Ham Excelsior
- St Ethelburgas

Senior career*
Years	Team	Apps	(Gls)
1905–1908	West Ham United	3	
1908–1909	Hastings & St Leonards United		
1909–1921	West Ham United	122	(3)
- * Club domestic league appearances and goals

Daniel James Woodards (18 November 1886 – 14 December 1964) was an English footballer who played as a wing half for West Ham United until his retirement from football in 1921.

== Playing career ==
Woodards was born in East Ham, England and started his football career playing with local sides in East London. He joined West Ham in 1905 but did not make an appearance for them until 1907 in a game in the Southern League against Brighton. He spent the 1908–09 season at Hastings & St Leonards United where he made at least 16 appearances, scoring 7 goals in all competitions but returned to West Ham in 1909 whom he played for in the Second Division after World War I. He finished playing in 1921 having made 197 appearances in all competitions for West Ham, scoring three goals

== Later career ==
Woodards returned to West Ham to work as a groundsman at Upton Park. He was the only person in the ground when, in August 1944, a Luftwaffe V1 landed on the pitch, exploding and causing damage to the playing area. West Ham were forced to play away from Upton Park, winning nine consecutive matches. After hard work by Woodards the pitch was restored and West Ham returned to play their home games, losing 1–0 to Tottenham Hotspur on their return.

Woodards died in 1964.
