= Nick Farquharson =

English footballer

Personal information
- Date of birth: 7 September 1988 (age 38)
- Place of birth: Coventry, England
- Position: Striker

Youth career
- Crewe Alexandra

Senior career*
| Years | Team | Apps | (Gls) |
| 2007–2008 | Crewe Alexandra | 0 | (0) |
| 2007 | → Witton Albion (loan) | 7 | (2) |
| 2007–2008 | → Northwich Victoria (loan) | 3 | (0) |
| 2008 | → Nantwich Town (loan) | 0 | (0) |
- * Club domestic league appearances and goals

Nick Farquharson (born 7 September 1988) is an English former footballer who played for Crewe Alexandra.

== Career ==
Farquharson began his career at the Crewe Alexandra academy, well known for its production of strikers. He progressed through the academy ranks and was named as Crewe's Under-18s captain for their 2006-07 campaign which saw the team progress well in their FA Youth Cup campaign before being knocked out by Cambridge United.

Following a brief spell at Witton Albion during the final third of the 06–07 season, which saw Farquharson score two goals in seven games, the young Englishman was awarded a professional contract at Crewe. The following season Farquharson made his professional debut for the club in their Football League Trophy exit to Chester City. Following the game, Crewe Technical Director Dario Gradi commented that Farquharson was "a little nervous and it became a bit of ordeal for him", however Gradi also commented that the young striker showed "flashes of his ability".

In January 2008, he went on loan to neighbors Nantwich Town. After completing his loan move at Nantwich Town Farquharson was then released by Crewe Alexandra in May 2008.
