= Julien Baudet =

French footballer and current manager (born 1979)

Personal information
- Full name: Julien Baudet
- Date of birth: 13 January 1979 (age 47)
- Place of birth: Grenoble, France
- Height: 6 ft 2 in (1.88 m)
- Position: Defender

Team information
- Current team: AC Seyssinet (Manager)

Senior career*
Years	Team	Apps	(Gls)
1999–2001	Toulouse	21	(0)
2001–2003	Oldham Athletic	44	(3)
2003–2004	Rotherham United	11	(0)
2004–2006	Notts County	81	(11)
2006–2009	Crewe Alexandra	110	(2)
2009–2010	Colorado Rapids	28	(1)
2012–2013	Grenoble Foot 38	11	(2)
Total		306	(19)

Managerial career
- 2011–2012: AC Seyssinet
- * Club domestic league appearances and goals as of 8 December 2013

Julien Baudet (born 13 January 1979) is a French former footballer and current manager.

== Club career ==
=== Europe ===
Although excelling as a skier in his youth, Baudet chose to concentrate on football, beginning his career with Toulouse FC in France, where he spent two years, clocking up 21 league appearances.

In 2001 Baudet moved to Oldham Athletic in the third tier in England on a free transfer. Spending two years at Oldham, he made 44 league appearances, scoring his first goal on 20 April 2002 against Queens Park Rangers.

After a free transfer in summer 2003 to Rotherham United in the second tier, Baudet played 11 times in the league before a free transfer to Notts County in Football League Two, where he spent two seasons as a regular starter and became club captain.

In July 2006, Baudet moved on yet another free transfer – to Crewe Alexandra – where he improved his game a great deal under the guidance of Steve Holland and Dario Gradi, becoming the club captain after the retirement of Neil Cox. He scored his first goal away at Carlisle United, and became quickly became a fans favourite and a vital part of the whole team including defence and attack. He was known as "the beast" by Crewe fans for his strong bustling presence and his contributions to the attack with spectacular long range free-kicks.

After being voted the Fans' Player of the Year for the 2007–08 season, Baudet commented, with typical understatement, that he was "relatively pleased" with the way he played over the year and that "like all footballers you do have good and bad days, but I think I have been fairly consistent in what has proved to be a disappointing season for the club", referring to Crewe's relegation battle to stay in League One.

=== North America ===
On 17 April 2009, Baudet reported that he would transfer at the end of the 2008–09 season to the Colorado Rapids of Major League Soccer. On 25 July 2009 Baudet made his competitive home debut for Colorado Rapids, breaking his arm in the first half after landing awkwardly on it. Baudet received a yellow card for the reckless challenge which resulted in the broken arm. Colorado eventually won the game 4–0 over New York Red Bulls. Upon his return from injury on 30 August 2009, Baudet came on as a substitute and opened his account with the Rapids, scoring the only goal in a 1–0 win over Houston Dynamo.

After winning the MLS Cup with Colorado, Baudet was traded to Seattle Sounders FC, along with teammate Danny Earls, on 22 November 2010.

=== Celtic trial ===
On 7 February 2011, Baudet featured in a Celtic XI who faced the League of Ireland team Shamrock Rovers at the Tallaght Stadium in Dublin. He played the full 90 minutes as Celtic ran out 2–0 winners, with goals from Daryl Murphy and Graham Carey.

=== GF38 ===
Baudet played his first match with Grenoble Foot 38 of the Championnat de France amateur or CFA, the fourth level of French football, on 21 July 2012. Baudet expressed excitement for the opportunity to play for his hometown team.

== Coaching career ==
After failing to earn a contract with Celtic, Baudet returned to England and began the process of obtaining a UEFA Pro Licence in coaching. On 19 June 2011, he was named manager of French amateur club AC Seyssinet. The club currently plays in the Division d'Honneur Régionale, the seventh division of French football.

== Honours ==
Colorado Rapids

- MLS Cup: 2010
- Major League Soccer Eastern Conference Championship: 2010

Awards
Preceded by Luke Varney	Crewe Alexandra F.C. Fans' Player of the Year; 2007–08	Succeeded by John Brayford
