= Ben Rix =

English footballer

Personal information
- Date of birth: 11 December 1983 (age 42)
- Place of birth: Wolverhampton, England
- Height: 5 ft 9 in (1.75 m)
- Position: Midfielder

Senior career*
Years	Team	Apps	(Gls)
2001–2009	Crewe Alexandra	128	(4)
2005	→ Scarborough (loan)	1	(0)
2006	→ AFC Bournemouth (loan)	11	(0)
2009	St Blazey	0	(0)
2009–2010	Nea Salamina		
Total		140	(4)
- * Club domestic league appearances and goals

Benjamin Rix (born 11 December 1983) is an English former professional footballer who played as a midfielder. Rix is currently playing for St Teath 2nd team in the St Piran League Division 3 (East) and has recently signed a new contract with the club to June 2027.

== Career ==
Rix joined Crewe Alexandra as a schoolboy, signing as a professional in January 2001. He made his debut in October and make 22 appearances in his first season, most as a substitute. The following season, he was more involved with the team starting 17 games and making six appearances as a substitute. He was developing well and was a regular the next season but a number of injuries limited his appearances. He did not make a single appearance in 2005–06 because of injury and he moved to Scarborough and AFC Bournemouth on loan.

On 22 January 2009, Crewe Alexandra confirmed that Rix had left the club by mutual consent.

In September 2009 Rix signed for Cornish South West Peninsula League Premier Division side St. Blazey A.F.C.

On 3 March 2010 Rix announced his retirement from the game.
