= Steve Holland (footballer) =

English football coach (born 1970)

Steve Holland MBE
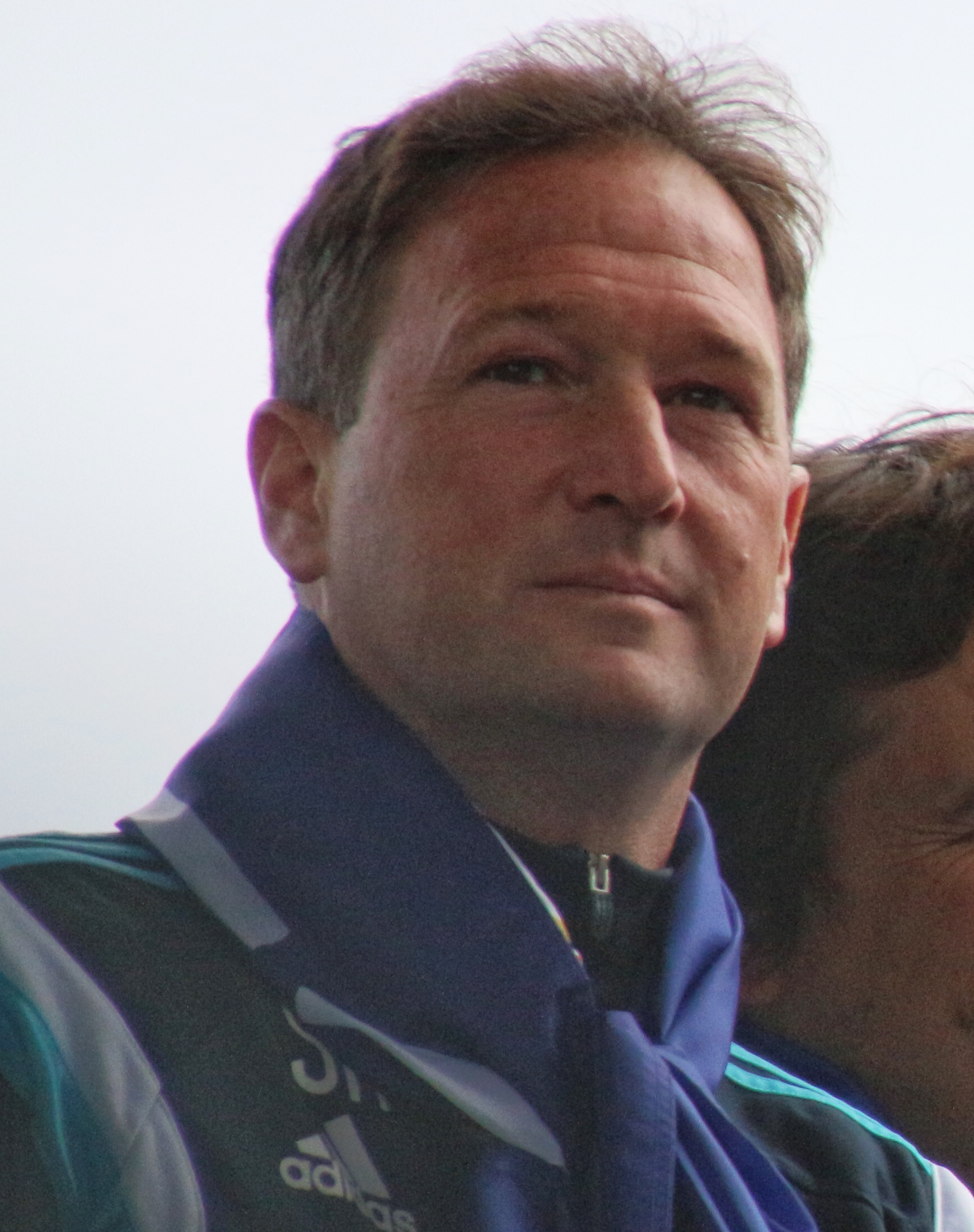
- Holland in 2015

Personal information
- Full name: Stephen Anthony Holland
- Date of birth: 30 April 1970 (age 56)
- Place of birth: Stockport, England

Senior career*
Years	Team	Apps	(Gls)
1986–1987	Derby County	0	(0)
1988–1989	Bury	0	(0)
1990	Husqvarna FF	0	(0)
1991	Northwich Victoria	18	(3)
1992	Hyde United		

Managerial career
- 2007–2008: Crewe Alexandra
- 2015: Chelsea (caretaker)
- 2024–2025: Yokohama F. Marinos
- * Club domestic league appearances and goals

Stephen Anthony Holland MBE (born 30 April 1970) is an English football coach who was most recently assistant head coach of Premier League club Manchester United. He has previously worked as the assistant manager to Gareth Southgate with the England national team.

== Playing career ==
As a schoolboy, Holland progressed through the academy at Derby County until his late teens, when, after a bad injury, he was told that he would not be kept on. He had short stints playing professional football for Bury and for Husqvarna FF of Sweden and semi-pro for Northwich Victoria and Hyde United but, aged 21, Holland decided to go into coaching.

== Coaching career ==
=== Crewe Alexandra ===
Holland was appointed as a youth coach at Crewe Alexandra in 1992 by Dario Gradi, who had coached Holland as a schoolboy. Holland had successfully completed the FA Full Coaching Licence aged 22, one of the youngest recipients of the coaching award. Holland went on to work at the club for 17 years working with young players of every age in the club's highly successful youth Academy. Holland slowly made his way through the coaching ranks at Crewe before becoming the club's Academy Director. Holland also had a spell as first team coach during the club's successful period in the Championship.

At the start of the 2006–07 season, Gradi revealed that Holland would be involved more in the first team set-up for the season. On 20 April 2007, it was announced by the football club that Gradi would be taking up a new role as Technical Director on 1 July 2007 while Holland would be promoted to the role of First-Team Coach, whilst keeping his job as Academy Director. He left this role on 18 November 2008 and was replaced by former manager Dario Gradi, after which he held talks with the club to decide his future there. In December 2008, it was reported that Holland would be leaving Crewe.

=== Stoke City ===
In March 2009, he was appointed manager of the youth academy at nearby Stoke City.

=== Chelsea ===
On 12 August 2009, Holland was named the reserve team manager for Chelsea. In May 2011, Holland won the Premier Reserve League, defeating Blackburn in the play-off final at Stamford Bridge.

On 29 June 2011, it was announced that Holland would become assistant first team coach at Chelsea under new manager André Villas-Boas. When Villas-Boas was dismissed on 4 March 2012 and Roberto Di Matteo was appointed caretaker manager of Chelsea, Holland filled the role of assistant manager. He continued in this position under the interim manager Rafael Benítez. In 2013, Holland continued in his role as assistant manager under Jose Mourinho. In December 2015, Holland took temporary charge for a Premier League fixture against Sunderland. In January 2016, Holland became assistant manager to Guus Hiddink for the remainder of the 2015–16 season and in July 2016, Holland became assistant to Antonio Conte. Holland left Chelsea after the 2016–17 season ended, following his appointment to a position with the England national team.

=== England ===
In August 2013, Holland was appointed assistant manager to the new England under 21s manager Gareth Southgate. Following the appointment of Gareth Southgate as the caretaker of the England national football team on 27 September 2016, when Sam Allardyce resigned after one game due to a corruption scandal, Holland also became assistant manager for the senior team.

After the England team reached the final of the delayed UEFA Euro 2020 in 2021, Holland was appointed Member of the Order of the British Empire (MBE) in the 2022 New Year Honours for services to association football.

=== Yokohama F. Marinos ===
On 17 December 2024, Holland was appointed as manager of J1 League club Yokohama F. Marinos. He was dismissed on 18 April 2025.

=== Manchester United ===
In January 2026, Holland was announced as assistant to head coach Michael Carrick at Manchester United.
