= Ryan Lynch (footballer) =

British footballer

Personal information
- Date of birth: 13 March 1987 (age 39)
- Place of birth: Coventry, England
- Position: Defender

Senior career*
Years	Team	Apps	(Gls)
2006–2007	Coventry City	0	(0)
2007	→ Tamworth (loan)	3	(0)
2007–2008	Crewe Alexandra	2	(0)
2008	→ Stafford Rangers (loan)	2	(0)
2008	→ Altrincham	8	(0)
- * Club domestic league appearances and goals as of 19:24, 10 February 2009 (UTC)

Ryan Lynch (born 13 March 1987) is an English former professional footballer.

Lynch began his club career with Coventry City as a trainee, but he found it difficult to break into the first team and so was sent out on loan to Tamworth where he made three appearances. Lynch was released by Coventry at the end of the 2006–07 season.

He then had a trial with Crewe Alexandra, after which Lynch signed a 1-year contract in July 2007. Despite this, Lynch only managed to make two league appearances for Crewe Alexandra. He was loaned out to Stafford Rangers and Altrincham during the second half of the 2007–08 season. After finishing his loan at Altrincham, Lynch was released by Crewe in May 2008.
