= Mat Bailey =

English footballer

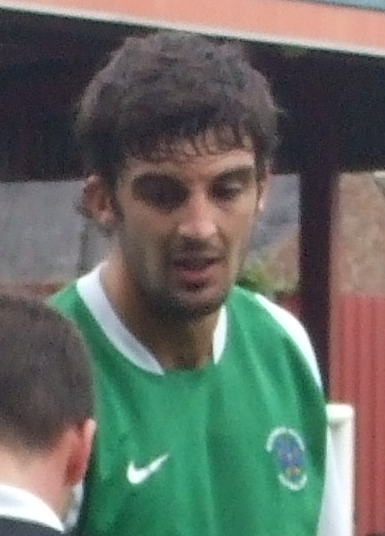
- Bailey playing for Northwich Victoria in 2009

Personal information
- Full name: Mathew John Bailey
- Date of birth: 12 March 1986 (age 40)
- Place of birth: Crewe, England
- Positions: Defender; striker

Youth career
- Nantwich Town

Senior career*
Years	Team	Apps	(Gls)
2003–2005	Stockport County	1	(0)
2004	→ Scunthorpe United (loan)	4	(0)
2005	→ Northwich Victoria (loan)	5	(0)
2005–2008	Crewe Alexandra	2	(0)
2005	→ Hereford United (loan)	5	(1)
2006	→ Southport (loan)	2	(0)
2006	→ Lancaster City (loan)		
2007	→ Barrow (loan)		
2008	→ Weymouth (loan)	9	(0)
2008–2010	Northwich Victoria		
2008	→ Hinckley United (loan)		
2010	Eastwood Town		
2011–2013	Nantwich Town	50	(9)
2013–2014	AFC Telford United	5	(0)
2013	→ Nantwich Town (loan)	7	(2)
2013	→ Nantwich Town (dual registration)	0	(0)
2014–2015	Nantwich Town		
2015	AFC Telford United	0	(0)
2015–2016	Nantwich Town		
2016–2018	Stafford Rangers		
2017–2019	Leek Town	0	(0)
- * Club domestic league appearances and goals as of 00:28, 6 November 2013 (UTC)

Mathew John Bailey (born 12 March 1986) is an English retired footballer. When playing for Crewe Alexandra, he played at centre back or up front.

== Career ==
=== Stockport County ===
As a youth, Bailey started his career at non-League club Nantwich Town scoring on his debut at Atherton Collieries in August 2002. He impressed Stockport County of the Football League enough to earn a trial for The Hatters. Whilst on trial, he impressed manager Carlton Palmer who offered Bailey a three-year contract, which Bailey duly signed. Under new manager Sammy McIlroy, Bailey impressed in the reserves and was sent out on a one-month loan to League Two club Scunthorpe United at the start of the 2004–2005 season, making his début against Rochdale, a 3–1 defeat for Scunthorpe. He played in four first-team matches whilst at Glanford Park without scoring. He returned to Stockport in October 2004 and his début under McIlroy in the 2–0 defeat against Wrexham in the Football League Trophy. McIlroy was sacked in late November and was replaced by Chris Turner. Bailey made his league début under Turner in the League One game against Chesterfield as an 89th minute substitute, replacing Mark Robertson. Bailey was sent out on loan to Conference National outfit Northwich Victoria for a month, making his début at Carlisle United, a 1–0 defeat for Northwich. He played in five first-team matches for Carlisle without scoring. He was released by Stockport in May 2005.

=== Crewe Alexandra ===
Whilst on loan at Northwich Victoria, Bailey trained with Championship club Crewe Alexandra and scored twice in an under-18 game for The Railwaymen. This performance impressed manager Dario Gradi enough to earn him a one-year contract in May 2005. During the 2005–06 season, Bailey went out on loan to non-league clubs Hereford United, Southport and Lancaster City to gain first-team experience, but despite not breaking into the first team during the season and Crewe's relegation to League One, he was offered a one-year contract extension. In the 2006–07 season, Bailey found himself in a similar situation to the previous season, failing to break into the first team and being sent out on loan, to Barrow of the Conference North, for whom he appeared in ten matches. He was offered another one-year extension to his contract. Bailey made his Alexandra début on 1 September 2007 in a 1–1 draw at Swindon Town, replacing Tom Pope in the 82nd minute.

==== Change of position ====
""Myself and Neil [Baker] will be working hard with Mat and improve on his defending. He is quick for a big lad and has decent footwork. It will be our aim to try to get him ready for the first-team and see if he is capable of being closer to the first-team around the New Year [2008]."

— Dario Gradi

Bailey did not impress manager Dario Gradi as a striker. Gradi, who had trained the likes of David Platt and Dean Ashton in their early years, announced his intention to convert Bailey from a striker to a centre back. Gradi did not expect Bailey to push through and challenge as a first team centre back until the start of 2008. Bailey made his full debut for Alexandra away at Oldham Athletic in the second round of the FA Cup, where he played at centre back. Bailey went on loan to Weymouth for a month in March 2008; he made four appearances without scoring. When he returned to Crewe, Bailey did not feature in the team and he was released in May 2008; he played only times for Crewe.

=== Later career ===
Bailey rejoined Northwich Victoria in May 2008. He was loaned to Hinckley United in December 2008, scoring on his debut for the Conference North club. He joined AFC Telford United in August 2013. Shortly afterwards, he was sent on loan to Nantwich Town.
