= Danny O'Donnell (footballer, born 1986) =

English footballer

Personal information
- Full name: Daniel O'Donnell
- Date of birth: 10 March 1986 (age 40)
- Place of birth: Rainford, England
- Height: 6 ft 2 in (1.88 m)
- Position: Defender

Team information
- Current team: Warrington Town

Youth career
- 2002–2005: Liverpool

Senior career*
Years	Team	Apps	(Gls)
2005–2007	Liverpool	0	(0)
2006–2007	→ Crewe Alexandra (loan)	25	(1)
2007–2010	Crewe Alexandra	78	(2)
2010	Shrewsbury Town	5	(0)
2011–2013	Stockport County	51	(3)
2013–2014	Barrow		
2014	Ballarat Red Devils		
2015	Workington		
2015–2016	Warrington Town		
- * Club domestic league appearances and goals

Daniel O'Donnell (born 10 March 1986) is an English semi-professional footballer who last played as a defender for Warrington Town.

== Career ==
=== Liverpool ===
Born in Rainford, Merseyside, O'Donnell was 16 years old when he was spotted by Liverpool playing in a local amateur league for his village side 'Rainford Rangers'. He joined Liverpool in 2002, and moved up through the ranks, and was captain of the under-18 side. He was promoted to train with the first-team at Melwood in 2005. He was included in the Liverpool squad for the 2005 FIFA Club World Championship, and was given the number 5 shirt for the tournament.

=== Crewe Alexandra ===
O'Donnell featured in Liverpool's pre-season friendlies against Wrexham and Crewe and excelled on both occasions. He played well enough to impress Crewe to make a move to get him on loan. It was announced on 7 August 2006 that he would join Crewe on a six-month loan deal and would wear the number 37 shirt. His loan deal was extended in December 2006. On 13 June, he signed for Crewe permanently for a fee rising to £300,000. He was released by Crewe in June 2010.

=== Shrewsbury Town ===
After his release he went on trial with Rochdale before he joined Shrewsbury Town on a 6-month deal in August 2010. He was released at the end of December when his deal expired.

=== Stockport County ===
On 27 January 2011 he joined Stockport County until the end of the season and made his debut two days later in his new club's 4–0 defeat at Rotherham. In May 2011 he was offered a new one-year deal by the club which the club announced he had signed in July 2011. He was offered a further one-year contract by the club in May 2012. Danny scored his final goal for the club on 4 September in the home loss to local rivals Macclesfield town, he bundled home a corner to make the score 3–3 but a late own goal by James Tunnicliffe gave the silkmen the three points.

=== Barrow ===
On 22 January 2013, O'Donnell signed for Barrow on a 16-month contract, taking him to the end of the 2013–14 season.

=== Ballarat Red Devils ===
On 10 March 2014 it was revealed that O'Donnell would be moving to Australia to the Ballarat Red Devils ahead of their inaugural National Premier League Victoria season. O'Donnell returned to England after visa issues ahead of the 2015 season.

=== Workington ===
In March 2015 Danny O'Donnell joined Workington AFC until the end of the season.
