= 1997–98 Crewe Alexandra F.C. season =

Crewe Alexandra
1997–98 season
- Chairman: John Bowler
- Manager: Dario Gradi
- Stadium: Gresty Road
- First Division: 11th
- FA Cup: Third round
- League Cup: First round
- Top goalscorer: Little (13)
- Average home league attendance: 5,243

During the 1997–98 English football season, Crewe Alexandra F.C. competed in the Football League First Division, in their 75th season in the English Football League.

== Season summary ==
In the 1997–98 season, Crewe were favourites to go straight back down to the Second Division and before Christmas, they were in the relegation zone and looked as though it would be a possibility but a fantastic run of 7 wins from 10 league games from January to the end of February, dramatically rose Crewe from a possible relegation to 12th and 7 points from the play-offs but it proved too much to ask for and Crewe finished a satisfying season in 11th place.

== Final league table ==
Pos	Team	Pld	W	D	L	GF	GA	GD	Pts
9	Wolverhampton Wanderers	46	18	11	17	57	53	+4	65
10	West Bromwich Albion	46	16	13	17	50	56	−6	61
11	Crewe Alexandra	46	18	5	23	58	65	−7	59
12	Oxford United	46	16	10	20	60	64	−4	58
13	Bradford City	46	14	15	17	46	59	−13	57

Source: Statto.com
Rules for classification: 1) Points; 2) Goals scored; 3) Goal difference

== Results ==
Crewe Alexandra's score comes first

=== Legend ===
Win	Draw	Loss

=== Football League First Division ===
Date	Opponent	Venue	Result	Attendance	Scorers
9 August 1997	Swindon Town	A	0–2	8,334	
16 August 1997	West Bromwich Albion	H	2–3	5,234	Adebola, Rivers
23 August 1997	Norwich City	A	2–0	11,821	Rivers, S Smith
2 September 1997	Bury	H	1–2	4,447	S Smith (pen)
13 September 1997	Portsmouth	A	3–2	9,505	Rivers, Anthrobus, Adebola
16 September 1997	Port Vale	H	0–1	5,519	
20 September 1997	Queens Park Rangers	H	2–3	5,348	Lunt, Adebola
27 September 1997	Tranmere Rovers	H	2–1	4,845	Anthrobus, Street
4 October 1997	Birmingham City	A	1–0	16,548	Rivers
11 October 1997	Reading	A	3–3	6,685	Westwood, Little, Adebola
18 October 1997	Middlesbrough	H	1–1	5,759	Adebola
21 October 1997	Ipswich Town	H	0–0	4,730	
25 October 1997	Bradford City	A	0–1	15,333	
29 October 1997	Manchester City	A	0–1	27,384	
1 November 1997	Nottingham Forest	A	1–3	18,268	Little
4 November 1997	Wolverhampton Wanderers	H	0–2	5,743	
8 November 1997	Oxford United	H	2–1	4,524	Westwood, Anthrobus
15 November 1997	Charlton Athletic	A	2–3	14,091	Street, S Smith
22 November 1997	Stockport County	H	0–1	5,231	
29 November 1997	Sheffield United	A	0–1	16,973	
6 December 1997	Huddersfield Town	H	2–5	4,861	Charnock, Adebola
13 December 1997	Stoke City	A	2–0	14,623	S Smith, Little
20 December 1997	Sunderland	H	0–3	5,404	
26 December 1997	Manchester City	H	1–0	5,759	Holsgrove
28 December 1997	Bury	A	1–1	5,661	Adebola
11 January 1998	Swindon Town	H	2–0	4,176	Little, Street
17 January 1998	West Bromwich Albion	A	1–0	15,257	Little
24 January 1998	Port Vale	A	3–2	10,571	S Smith (pen), Whalley, Foran
31 January 1998	Norwich City	H	1–0	5,559	Fuglestad (own goal)
7 February 1998	Queens Park Rangers	A	2–3	13,429	Anthrobus, Johnson
14 February 1998	Portsmouth	H	3–1	5,114	Little, Garvey, Lunt
17 February 1998	Birmingham City	H	0–2	5,559	
21 February 1998	Tranmere Rovers	A	3–0	7,534	Rivers, Little (2)
25 February 1998	Middlesbrough	A	0–1	29,936	
28 February 1998	Reading	H	1–0	5,202	Rivers
3 March 1998	Oxford United	A	0–0	6,069	
7 March 1998	Nottingham Forest	H	1–4	5,759	Little
14 March 1998	Wolverhampton Wanderers	A	0–1	24,272	
21 March 1998	Charlton Athletic	H	0–3	5,252	
28 March 1998	Stockport County	A	1–0	8,370	S Smith
11 April 1998	Huddersfield Town	A	0–2	11,263	
13 April 1998	Stoke City	H	2–0	5,759	Westwood, Lightfoot
18 April 1998	Sunderland	A	1–2	40,441	Charnock
25 April 1998	Bradford City	H	5–0	5,054	Anthrobus, Street, Little (3)
30 April 1998	Sheffield United	H	2–1	5,759	Anthrobus, Little
3 May 1998	Ipswich Town	A	2–3	19,105	Charnock, Garvey

=== FA Cup ===
Round	Date	Opponent	Venue	Result	Attendance	Goalscorers
R3	3 January 1998	Birmingham City	H	1–2	4,607	Rivers

=== League Cup ===
Round	Date	Opponent	Venue	Result	Attendance	Goalscorers
R1 First Leg	12 August 1997	Bury	H	2–3	2,618	Lunt, S Smith
R1 Second Leg	26 August 1997	Bury	A	3–3 (lost 5–6 on agg)	3,296	Rivers, S Smith, Butler (own goal)

== Squad ==
Note: Flags indicate national team as defined under FIFA eligibility rules; some limited exceptions apply. Players may hold more than one non-FIFA nationality.

No.	Pos.	Nation	Player
—	GK	AUS	Jason Kearton
—	DF	ENG	Shaun Smith
—	DF	ENG	Marcus Bignot
—	DF	ENG	Lee Unsworth
—	DF	ENG	Dave Walton
—	MF	ENG	Seth Johnson
—	MF	ENG	Phil Charnock
—	MF	ENG	Mark Rivers
—	MF	ENG	Kenny Lunt
—	FW	ENG	Colin Little
—	FW	ENG	Steve Anthrobus
—	FW	NGA	Dele Adebola
—	DF	ENG	Ashley Westwood
—	MF	ENG	Gareth Whalley
—	MF	ENG	Kevin Street
—	GK	NGA	Ademola Bankole
—	DF	ENG	Mark Foran
—	MF	ENG	Steve Garvey

No.	Pos.	Nation	Player
—	DF	ENG	Chris Lightfoot
—	MF	ENG	Paul Holsgrove
—	DF	ENG	Julian Watts
—	FW	ENG	Jamie Moralee
—	FW	ENG	Steve Guinan (on loan from Nottingham Forest)
—	DF	ENG	Steve Pope
—	MF	ENG	Jermaine Wright
—	FW	WAL	Peter Smith
—	MF	ENG	Francis Tierney
—	DF	ENG	David Wright
—	DF	ENG	John Pemberton
—	DF	ENG	Jamie Collins
—	DF	ENG	Stephen Foster
—	GK	ENG	Neil Cutler
—	DF	ENG	Steve Macauley
—	GK	ENG	Mark Gayle
