= 2001–02 Crewe Alexandra F.C. season =

Crewe Alexandra
2001–02 season
- Chairman: John Bowler
- Manager: Dario Gradi
- Stadium: Gresty Road
- First Division: 22nd (relegated)
- FA Cup: Fifth round
- League Cup: Third round
- Top goalscorer: League: Hulse (11); All: Hulse (12)
- Average home league attendance: 7,129

During the 2001–02 English football season, Crewe Alexandra competed in the Football League First Division, their 79th in the English Football League.

== Season summary ==
A disappointing season for Crewe resulted in relegation after five seasons in the second tier of English football. Despite relegation, there was a momentous occasion where Crewe boss Gradi celebrated his 1,000th game in charge of Crewe on 20 November 2001 – an away fixture at Carrow Road, the home of Norwich City.

== Final league table ==
Pos	Team	Pld	W	D	L	GF	GA	GD	Pts	Qualification or relegation
20	Sheffield Wednesday	46	12	14	20	49	71	−22	50	
21	Rotherham United	46	10	19	17	52	66	−14	49	
22	Crewe Alexandra (R)	46	12	13	21	47	76	−29	49	Relegation to the Second Division
23	Barnsley (R)	46	11	15	20	59	86	−27	48	Relegation to the Second Division
24	Stockport County (R)	46	6	8	32	42	102	−60	26	Relegation to the Second Division

Rules for classification: 1) Points; 2) Goal difference; 3) Goals scored
(R) Relegated

== Results ==
Crewe Alexandra's score comes first

=== Legend ===
Win	Draw	Loss

=== Football League First Division ===
Date	Opponent	Venue	Result	Attendance	Scorers
11 August 2001	Grimsby Town	A	0–1	5,368	
18 August 2001	Sheffield Wednesday	H	0–2	7,933	
25 August 2001	Manchester City	A	2–5	32,844	Little, Collins
28 August 2001	Millwall	H	1–0	5,913	Hulse
8 September 2001	Walsall	H	2–1	6,809	Jack, Lunt
15 September 2001	Barnsley	A	0–2	10,976	
18 September 2001	Wimbledon	H	0–4	5,563	
22 September 2001	Watford	H	1–0	6,507	Hulse
25 September 2001	Burnley	A	3–3	13,964	Lunt, Foster, Hulse
29 September 2001	Birmingham City	H	0–0	7,314	
13 October 2001	Preston North End	H	2–1	7,746	Ashton, Foster
16 October 2001	Wolverhampton Wanderers	A	1–0	22,569	Hulse
21 October 2001	Coventry City	A	0–1	15,788	
24 October 2001	Stockport County	H	0–0	6,679	
27 October 2001	Sheffield United	A	0–1	15,185	
30 October 2001	Rotherham United	A	2–2	5,971	Brammer, Lunt
2 November 2001	Bradford City	H	2–2	6,597	Ashton, Foster
10 November 2001	Gillingham	H	0–0	5,419	
17 November 2001	Crystal Palace	A	1–4	21,802	Ashton
20 November 2001	Norwich City	A	2–2	15,710	Walton, Brammer
24 November 2001	Nottingham Forest	H	0–3	8,402	
1 December 2001	Stockport County	A	1–0	5,308	Foster
8 December 2001	Portsmouth	A	4–2	14,430	Hulse, Sodje, Charnock, Lunt
15 December 2001	West Bromwich Albion	H	1–1	8,154	Thomas
26 December 2001	Walsall	A	1–2	7,325	Jack
29 December 2001	Millwall	A	0–2	11,630	
12 January 2002	Sheffield Wednesday	A	0–1	16,737	
19 January 2002	Grimsby Town	H	2–0	5,974	Thomas, Smith (pen)
29 January 2002	Norwich City	H	1–0	6,285	Ashton
9 February 2002	Coventry City	H	1–6	7,835	Hulse
20 February 2002	Wolverhampton Wanderers	H	1–4	8,371	Jack
23 February 2002	Burnley	H	1–2	6,458	Hulse
2 March 2002	Watford	A	1–0	15,199	Ashton
5 March 2002	Barnsley	H	2–0	6,258	Ashton, Street
12 March 2002	Manchester City	H	1–3	10,092	Jack
16 March 2002	Portsmouth	H	1–1	7,170	Hulse
20 March 2002	Preston North End	A	2–2	13,396	Lunt, Hulse
23 March 2002	Bradford City	A	0–2	12,846	
26 March 2002	West Bromwich Albion	A	1–4	21,303	Ashton
30 March 2002	Sheffield United	H	2–2	7,855	Hulse, Foster
1 April 2002	Gillingham	A	0–1	7,748	
4 April 2002	Wimbledon	A	0–2	5,007	
7 April 2002	Crystal Palace	H	0–0	6,724	
10 April 2002	Birmingham City	A	1–3	28,615	Jack
13 April 2002	Nottingham Forest	A	2–2	22,870	Jack, Hulse
21 April 2002	Rotherham United	H	2–0	7,904	Jack, Sodje

=== FA Cup ===
Round	Date	Opponent	Venue	Result	Attendance	Goalscorers
R3	15 January 2002	Sheffield Wednesday	H	2–1	6,271	Rix, Foster
R4	26 January 2002	Rotherham United	A	4–2	8,477	Thomas, Ashton (2), Vaughan
R5	17 February 2002	Everton	A	0–0	29,399	
R5R	26 February 2002	Everton	H	1–2	10,073	Ashton

=== League Cup ===
Round	Date	Opponent	Venue	Result	Attendance	Goalscorers
R1	21 August 2001	York City	A	2–2 (won 6–5 on pens)	1,663	Little, Richards
R2	11 September 2001	Rushden & Diamonds	H	2–0 (a.e.t.)	4,807	Walton, Smith (pen)
R3	9 October 2001	Ipswich Town	H	2–3	6,116	Hulse, Brammer

== Squad ==
Note: Flags indicate national team as defined under FIFA eligibility rules; some limited exceptions apply. Players may hold more than one non-FIFA nationality.

No.	Pos.	Nation	Player
1	GK	NGA	Ademola Bankole
2	DF	ENG	David Wright
3	DF	ENG	Shaun Smith
4	MF	ENG	Kenny Lunt
5	DF	ENG	Dave Walton
6	DF	ENG	Steve Macauley
7	FW	ENG	Colin Little
8	MF	ENG	Phil Charnock
9	FW	ENG	Paul Tait
10	FW	ENG	Dean Ashton
11	FW	VIN	Rodney Jack
12	DF	ENG	Efe Sodje
13	GK	TRI	Clayton Ince
14	MF	ENG	Kevin Street
15	MF	ENG	Wayne Collins
16	FW	ENG	Rob Hulse

No.	Pos.	Nation	Player
17	MF	ENG	Neil Sorvel
19	MF	ENG	Geoff Thomas
20	FW	NIR	Steve Jones
21	MF	ENG	Dave Brammer
22	DF	ENG	Stephen Foster
23	MF	ENG	Phil Trainer
24	MF	IRL	Gareth Whalley (on loan from Bradford City)
25	DF	ENG	Richard Walker
26	FW	ENG	John Grant
28	DF	ENG	Chris McCready
30	MF	ENG	Lee Bell
31	MF	ENG	Ben Rix
32	MF	WAL	David Vaughan
33	GK	ENG	Stuart Tomlinson
34	FW	ENG	Paul Edwards

=== Left club during season ===
Note: Flags indicate national team as defined under FIFA eligibility rules; some limited exceptions apply. Players may hold more than one non-FIFA nationality.

No.	Pos.	Nation	Player
27	FW	ENG	Marc Richards (on loan from Blackburn Rovers)
24	MF	ENG	Alan Navarro (on loan from Liverpool)
27	FW	IRL	Graham Barrett (on loan from Arsenal)

No.	Pos.	Nation	Player
35	GK	ENG	Gary Montgomery (on loan from Coventry City)
29	DF	ENG	Dean Howell (to Southport)
18	DF	ENG	Anthony Charles (to Hayes)
