= 1998–99 Crewe Alexandra F.C. season =

Crewe Alexandra
1998–99 season
- Chairman: John Bowler
- Manager: Dario Gradi
- Stadium: Gresty Road
- First Division: 18th
- FA Cup: Third round
- League Cup: Third round
- Top goalscorer: League: Little (10); All: Little (12)
- Average home league attendance: 5,269

During the 1998–99 English football season, Crewe Alexandra F.C. competed in the Football League First Division, their 76th in the English Football League.

== Season summary ==
In the 1998–99 season, Crewe had a disastrous first half of the campaign which saw them almost midway point at the bottom of the table with just 2 wins from 22 league games and 11 points from safety. Even though they managed to get another couple of wins together; by 20 February, Crewe were still bottom and 11 points from safety with 14 league matches remaining and their First Division status was in severe danger of being lost. From then on against the odds, Crewe went on a superb run of just 3 defeats from their remaining 14 league games, winning 7 of them on their way to completing the great escape, the key result being a 3–1 win against Portsmouth which saved them from the drop.

== Final league table ==
Pos	Team	Pld	W	D	L	GF	GA	GD	Pts
16	Stockport County	46	12	17	17	49	60	−11	53
17	Swindon Town	46	13	11	22	59	81	−22	50
18	Crewe Alexandra	46	12	12	22	54	78	−24	48
19	Portsmouth	46	11	14	21	57	73	−16	47
20	Queens Park Rangers	46	12	11	23	52	61	−9	47

Rules for classification: 1) Points; 2) Goals scored; 3) Goal difference

== Results ==
Crewe Alexandra's score comes first

=== Legend ===
Win	Draw	Loss

=== Football League First Division ===
Date	Opponent	Venue	Result	Attendance	Scorers
8 August 1998	Norwich City	A	1–2	15,016	Rivers
15 August 1998	Barnsley	H	3–1	5,289	Smith (pen), Lightfoot (2)
22 August 1998	Bury	A	0–1	5,073	
28 August 1998	Bradford City	H	2–1	5,759	Lunt, Collins
31 August 1998	Sheffield United	A	1–3	15,922	Jack
8 September 1998	Crystal Palace	H	0–1	4,977	
12 September 1998	Stockport County	A	1–1	7,302	J Wright
19 September 1998	Bolton Wanderers	H	4–4	5,744	Little, Charnock, Rivers, Smith
26 September 1998	Bristol City	A	2–5	9,810	Anthrobus (2)
29 September 1998	Grimsby Town	A	1–1	5,024	Rivers
3 October 1998	Wolverhampton Wanderers	H	0–0	5,759	
17 October 1998	Birmingham City	A	1–3	20,087	Johnson
20 October 1998	Port Vale	A	0–1	8,205	
24 October 1998	Tranmere Rovers	H	1–4	5,080	Little
31 October 1998	Oxford United	A	1–1	5,607	Little
3 November 1998	Sunderland	H	1–4	5,361	Little
7 November 1998	Swindon Town	H	0–2	4,489	
14 November 1998	Queens Park Rangers	H	0–2	5,001	
21 November 1998	Watford	A	2–4	9,405	Jack, Little
28 November 1998	Ipswich Town	H	0–3	5,165	
5 December 1998	Portsmouth	A	0–2	9,800	
8 December 1998	West Bromwich Albion	H	1–1	5,007	Anthrobus
12 December 1998	Queens Park Rangers	A	1–0	11,296	J Wright
19 December 1998	Huddersfield Town	H	1–2	5,102	Jack
26 December 1998	Bury	H	3–1	5,333	Little, Rivers, J Wright
28 December 1998	Sunderland	A	0–2	41,433	
9 January 1999	Norwich City	H	3–2	4,782	Street (2), Rivers
16 January 1999	Bradford City	A	1–4	12,595	Little
30 January 1999	Sheffield United	H	1–2	5,243	Jack
6 February 1999	Barnsley	A	2–2	15,377	Jack (2)
13 February 1999	Crystal Palace	A	1–1	14,823	Walton
20 February 1999	Stockport County	H	0–2	5,473	
27 February 1999	Bolton Wanderers	A	3–1	19,437	Johnson, Jack (2)
13 March 1999	Swindon Town	A	2–1	7,434	Jack, Charnock
16 March 1999	Grimsby Town	H	0–0	4,855	
20 March 1999	Oxford United	H	3–1	4,791	Murphy, Little, Smith (pen)
26 March 1999	Tranmere Rovers	A	0–3	9,359	
30 March 1999	Wolverhampton Wanderers	A	0–3	24,197	
2 April 1999	Birmingham City	H	0–0	5,582	
5 April 1999	West Bromwich Albion	A	5–1	12,308	D Wright, J Wright (2), Johnson, Rivers
10 April 1999	Port Vale	H	0–0	5,606	
17 April 1999	Watford	H	0–1	5,461	
24 April 1999	Ipswich Town	A	2–1	20,845	Rivers, Macauley
27 April 1999	Bristol City	H	1–0	5,579	Johnson
1 May 1999	Portsmouth	H	3–1	5,759	Little (2), Smith
9 May 1999	Huddersfield Town	A	0–0	15,105	

=== FA Cup ===
Round	Date	Opponent	Venue	Result	Attendance	Goalscorers
R3	2 January 1999	Oxford United	H	1–3	4,207	Johnson

=== League Cup ===
Round	Date	Opponent	Venue	Result	Attendance	Goalscorers
R1 1st Leg	11 August 1998	Oldham Athletic	A	2–3	3,766	Little (2)
R1 2nd Leg	18 August 1998	Oldham Athletic	H	2–0 (won 4–3 on agg)	3,428	Jack (2)
R2 1st Leg	16 September 1998	Bristol City	A	1–1	3,082	Rivers
R2 2nd Leg	22 September 1998	Bristol City	H	2–0 (won 3–1 on agg)	3,089	Rivers (2)
R3	28 October 1998	Blackburn Rovers	H	0–1	5,403	

== Squad ==
Note: Flags indicate national team as defined under FIFA eligibility rules; some limited exceptions apply. Players may hold more than one non-FIFA nationality.

No.	Pos.	Nation	Player
-	GK	AUS	Jason Kearton
-	DF	ENG	Shaun Smith
-	DF	ENG	Dave Walton
-	DF	ENG	Marcus Bignot
-	DF	ENG	David Wright
-	MF	ENG	Jermaine Wright
-	MF	ENG	Phil Charnock
-	MF	ENG	Mark Rivers
-	FW	VIN	Rodney Jack
-	FW	ENG	Colin Little
-	FW	ENG	Steve Anthrobus
-	DF	ENG	Chris Lightfoot
-	MF	ENG	Danny Murphy (on loan from Liverpool)

No.	Pos.	Nation	Player
-	GK	ENG	Kevin Welsby
-	DF	ENG	Lee Unsworth
-	DF	ENG	Steve Macauley
-	MF	ENG	Kenny Lunt
-	MF	ENG	Kevin Street
-	MF	ENG	Jamie Collins
-	DF	ENG	Mark Foran
-	FW	ENG	Mike Newell
-	FW	WAL	Peter Smith
-	DF	ENG	Stephen Foster
-	FW	ENG	Rob Hulse
-	DF	ENG	John Pemberton
-	FW	ENG	Andy Lovelock

=== Left club during the season ===
Note: Flags indicate national team as defined under FIFA eligibility rules; some limited exceptions apply. Players may hold more than one non-FIFA nationality.

No. / Pos. / Nation / Player; - / DF / ENG / Matt Wicks (to Peterborough United)	No. / Pos. / Nation / Player; - / MF / ENG / Seth Johnson (to Derby County)
