= 2000–01 Crewe Alexandra F.C. season =

Crewe Alexandra
2000–01 season
- Chairman: John Bowler
- Manager: Dario Gradi
- Stadium: Alexandra Stadium
- First Division: 14th
- FA Cup: Fourth round
- Football League Cup: Second round
- Top goalscorer: Hulse (11)
- Average home league attendance: 9,293

During the 2000–01 English football season, Crewe Alexandra F.C. competed in the Football League First Division, their 78th in the English Football League.

== Season summary ==
A terrible first half of the 2000–01 season saw Crewe bottom at Christmas. Then with the emergence of Rob Hulse and Dean Ashton, Crewe went on a fantastic run, winning nine of their remaining matches to starve off relegation to finish 14th. A 3–1 defeat by Preston on 28 April finally saw the Alex beaten at home after an unbeaten run of nine in the league.

== Final league table ==
Pos	Team	Pld	W	D	L	GF	GA	GD	Pts
12	Wolverhampton Wanderers	46	14	13	19	45	48	−3	55
13	Gillingham	46	13	16	17	61	66	−5	55
14	Crewe Alexandra	46	15	10	21	47	62	−15	55
15	Norwich City	46	14	12	20	46	58	−12	54
16	Barnsley	46	15	9	22	49	62	−13	54

Rules for classification: 1) Points; 2) Goal difference; 3) Goals scored

== Results ==
Crewe Alexandra's score comes first

=== Legend ===
Win	Draw	Loss

=== Football League First Division ===
Date	Opponent	Venue	Result	Attendance	Scorers
12 August 2000	Fulham	A	0–2	11,157	
19 August 2000	Blackburn Rovers	H	0–0	7,500	
26 August 2000	Queens Park Rangers	A	0–1	9,415	
29 August 2000	Grimsby Town	H	2–0	5,305	Rivers, Jack
9 September 2000	Norwich City	H	0–0	5,955	
12 September 2000	West Bromwich Albion	H	0–1	6,222	
16 September 2000	Watford	A	0–3	13,784	
23 September 2000	Barnsley	H	2–2	5,738	Hulse, Jack
30 September 2000	Tranmere Rovers	A	3–1	8,162	Hulse (2), Little
8 October 2000	Birmingham City	H	0–2	6,829	
14 October 2000	Sheffield United	A	0–1	12,921	
17 October 2000	Portsmouth	A	1–2	14,621	Smith (pen)
21 October 2000	Wimbledon	H	0–4	5,469	
24 October 2000	Huddersfield Town	H	1–0	5,215	Cramb
28 October 2000	Gillingham	A	1–0	8,347	Little
31 October 2000	Burnley	A	0–1	13,189	
4 November 2000	Wolverhampton Wanderers	H	2–0	7,147	Cramb (2)
10 November 2000	Preston North End	A	1–2	12,632	Rivers
18 November 2000	Stockport County	H	1–2	6,099	Hulse
25 November 2000	Sheffield Wednesday	H	1–0	7,103	Rivers
2 December 2000	Huddersfield Town	A	1–3	10,603	Cramb
9 December 2000	Bolton Wanderers	A	1–4	12,836	Sorvel
16 December 2000	Crystal Palace	H	1–1	5,752	Little
23 December 2000	Fulham	H	1–2	6,935	Rivers
26 December 2000	Nottingham Forest	A	0–1	20,903	
30 December 2000	Blackburn Rovers	A	0–1	18,554	
13 January 2001	Grimsby Town	A	3–1	4,495	Hulse (2), Rivers
3 February 2001	Burnley	H	4–2	6,994	Street, Smith (2 pens), Ashton
10 February 2001	Norwich City	A	1–1	15,164	Jack
17 February 2001	Watford	H	2–0	6,757	Jack, Ashton
20 February 2001	West Bromwich Albion	A	2–2	15,476	Ashton, Hulse
24 February 2001	Barnsley	A	0–3	13,175	
3 March 2001	Tranmere Rovers	H	3–1	7,157	Macauley, Hulse, Little
6 March 2001	Sheffield United	H	1–0	6,909	Lunt
10 March 2001	Birmingham City	A	0–2	28,042	
13 March 2001	Nottingham Forest	H	1–0	7,916	Rivers
17 March 2001	Portsmouth	H	1–0	6,182	Ashton
31 March 2001	Crystal Palace	A	0–1	20,872	
10 April 2001	Queens Park Rangers	H	2–2	6,354	Ashton, Smith
14 April 2001	Wolverhampton Wanderers	A	0–0	20,364	
16 April 2001	Gillingham	H	2–1	7,051	Navarro, Ashton
18 April 2001	Bolton Wanderers	H	2–1	8,054	Hulse, Ashton
21 April 2001	Stockport County	A	0–3	7,163	
24 April 2001	Wimbledon	A	3–3	5,468	Rivers, Hulse, Ashton
28 April 2001	Preston North End	H	1–3	9,415	Hulse
6 May 2001	Sheffield Wednesday	A	0–0	28,007	

=== FA Cup ===
Round	Date	Opponent	Venue	Result	Attendance	Goalscorers
R3	6 January 2001	Cardiff City	A	1–1	13,403	Bowen (own goal)
R3R	16 January 2001	Cardiff City	H	2–1	5,785	Smith (pen), Rivers
R4	27 January 2001	Stockport County	H	0–1	7,318	

=== League Cup ===
Round	Date	Opponent	Venue	Result	Attendance	Goalscorers
R1 1st Leg	22 August 2000	Bury	H	2–2	3,199	Foster, Rivers
R1 2nd Leg	5 September 2000	Bury	A	2–1 (won 4–3 on agg)	2,106	Rivers, Little
R2 1st Leg	19 September 2000	Barnsley	A	0–4	5,005	
R2 2nd Leg	26 September 2000	Barnsley	H	0–3 (lost 0–7 on agg)	1,775	

== Squad ==
Note: Flags indicate national team as defined under FIFA eligibility rules; some limited exceptions apply. Players may hold more than one non-FIFA nationality.

No.	Pos.	Nation	Player
1	GK	AUS	Jason Kearton
2	DF	ENG	David Wright
3	DF	ENG	Shaun Smith
4	MF	ENG	Kenny Lunt
5	DF	ENG	Dave Walton
6	DF	ENG	Steve Macauley
7	MF	ENG	Colin Little
8	MF	ENG	Phil Charnock
9	FW	ENG	Paul Tait
10	MF	ENG	Mark Rivers
11	FW	JAM	Rodney Jack
12	DF	NGA	Efetobore Sodje
13	GK	TRI	Clayton Ince
14	FW	ENG	Kevin Street
16	FW	ENG	Rob Hulse
17	MF	ENG	Neil Sorvel
18	DF	ENG	Anthony Charles
19	MF	ENG	Chris Lightfoot

No.	Pos.	Nation	Player
20	FW	ENG	Peter Smith
21	MF	ENG	Jamie Collins
22	DF	ENG	Stephen Foster
23	MF	ENG	Phil Trainer
24	GK	ENG	Kevin Welsby
25	DF	ENG	Richard Walker
26	FW	ENG	John Grant
27	DF	ENG	Gareth Liddle
28	DF	ENG	Chris McCready
29	DF	ENG	Dean Howell
30	FW	ENG	Colin Cramb
31	GK	NGA	Ademola Bankole
32	MF	WAL	David Vaughan
35	MF	ENG	Alan Navarro (on loan from Liverpool)
36	FW	ENG	Dean Ashton
37	DF	IRL	Jim Gannon
38	MF	ENG	Ben Rix

=== Left club during season ===
Note: Flags indicate national team as defined under FIFA eligibility rules; some limited exceptions apply. Players may hold more than one non-FIFA nationality.

No. / Pos. / Nation / Player; 34 / MF / ENG / Chris Lumsdon (on loan from Sunderland)	No. / Pos. / Nation / Player; 35 / DF / IRL / Alan Maybury (on loan from Leeds United)
