= 1996–97 Crewe Alexandra F.C. season =

Crewe Alexandra
1996–97 season
- Chairman: John Bowler
- Manager: Dario Gradi
- Stadium: Gresty Road
- Second Division: 6th (promoted via play-offs)
- Play-offs: Winners
- FA Cup: Third round
- League Cup: First round
- Football League Trophy: Northern semi finals
- Top goalscorer: League: Adebola (16); All: Adebola (18)
- Average home league attendance: 3,978

During the 1996–97 English football season, Crewe Alexandra F.C. competed in the Football League Second Division, in their 74th season in the English Football League.

== Season summary ==
In the 1996–97 season, Crewe had a great season by reaching the play-offs by finishing in the final play-off position, which was achieved on the final day by earning a 1–1 draw at York that was required as Blackpool had scored more goals which meant knowing a defeat and a Blackpool win at Wrexham would see Crewe slip out of the top six and Blackpool would have still had a chance of promotion. Blackpool though lost 2–1 so it didn't matter in the end with Crewe's result. In the play-offs, they beat Luton, who just missed out on automatic promotion, 4–3 on aggregate to get to Wembley and achieved promotion with a 1–0 win against Brentford.

== Final league table ==
Pos	Team	Pld	W	D	L	GF	GA	GD	Pts	Promotion or relegation
4	Brentford	46	20	14	12	56	43	+13	74	Qualification for the Second Division play-offs
5	Bristol City	46	21	10	15	69	51	+18	73	Qualification for the Second Division play-offs
6	Crewe Alexandra (O, P)	46	22	7	17	56	47	+9	73	Qualification for the Second Division play-offs
7	Blackpool	46	18	15	13	60	47	+13	69	
8	Wrexham	46	17	18	11	55	50	+5	69	

Rules for classification: In the Football League goals scored (GF) takes precedence over goal difference (GD).
(O) Play-off winners; (P) Promoted

== Results ==
Crewe Alexandra's score comes first

=== Legend ===
Win	Draw	Loss

=== Football League Second Division ===
Date	Opponent	Venue	Result	Attendance	Scorers
17 August 1996	Stockport County	H	1–0	4,310	Tierney
24 August 1996	Peterborough United	A	2–2	6,357	Ellison (2)
27 August 1996	Preston North End	A	1–2	9,498	Murphy
31 August 1996	Watford	H	0–2	3,655	
7 September 1996	Bournemouth	A	1–0	3,218	Savage
10 September 1996	Bury	H	2–0	3,627	Tierney, Barr
14 September 1996	Wrexham	H	3–1	4,469	Adebola (2), Tierney
21 September 1996	Millwall	A	0–2	9,320	
28 September 1996	Plymouth Argyle	H	3–0	3,797	Barr, Adebola, Murphy
1 October 1996	Blackpool	H	3–2	4,314	Rivers, Adebola, Macauley
4 October 1996	Bristol Rovers	A	0–2	6,211	
12 October 1996	Brentford	H	2–0	4,313	Rivers, S Smith (pen)
15 October 1996	York City	H	0–1	3,463	
19 October 1996	Chesterfield	A	0–1	4,030	
26 October 1996	Shrewsbury Town	A	1–0	3,878	Murphy
29 October 1996	Rotherham United	H	1–0	3,162	Barr
2 November 1996	Wycombe Wanderers	H	3–0	3,636	Adebola, Whalley, Murphy
9 November 1996	Burnley	A	0–2	9,459	
23 November 1996	Walsall	A	0–1	3,653	
30 November 1996	Shrewsbury Town	H	5–1	4,035	Murphy, S Smith, Rivers (2), Whalley
3 December 1996	Gillingham	A	1–2	3,575	Rivers
14 December 1996	Luton Town	A	0–6	5,455	
20 December 1996	Notts County	H	3–0	3,125	Adebola (2), Charnock
28 December 1996	Bournemouth	H	2–0	3,687	Adebola (2)
11 January 1997	Plymouth Argyle	A	0–1	5,036	
18 January 1997	Blackpool	A	2–1	4,760	Murphy, Adebola
25 January 1997	Rotherham United	A	4–1	2,832	Adebola (2), Murphy, S Smith
1 February 1997	Burnley	H	1–1	4,734	Macauley
8 February 1997	Wycombe Wanderers	A	0–2	4,902	
15 February 1997	Walsall	H	1–0	4,648	Murphy
22 February 1997	Bristol City	A	0–3	11,306	
1 March 1997	Gillingham	H	3–2	3,555	Barr (2), Murphy
8 March 1997	Notts County	A	1–0	4,047	Rivers
15 March 1997	Luton Town	H	0–0	4,475	
18 March 1997	Millwall	H	0–0	3,695	
22 March 1997	Peterborough United	H	1–1	3,565	Murphy
25 March 1997	Bristol City	H	1–2	3,687	Westwood
29 March 1997	Stockport County	A	0–1	7,411	
31 March 1997	Preston North End	H	1–0	4,407	Adebola
5 April 1997	Watford	A	1–0	12,441	Whalley
12 April 1997	Bristol Rovers	H	1–0	4,281	Adebola
15 April 1997	Bury	A	0–1	4,725	
19 April 1997	Brentford	A	2–0	6,183	Adebola, S Smith
22 April 1997	Wrexham	A	1–1	4,643	Johnson
26 April 1997	Chesterfield	H	1–2	4,858	Adebola
3 May 1997	York City	A	1–1	4,366	Westwood

=== Second Division play-offs ===
Round	Date	Opponent	Venue	Result	Attendance	Goalscorers
SF 1st Leg	11 May 1997	Luton Town	H	2–1	5,467	Rivers, Little
SF 2nd Leg	14 May 1997	Luton Town	A	2–2 (won 4–3 on agg)	8,168	Little, S Smith
F	25 May 1997	Brentford	N	1–0	34,149	S Smith

=== FA Cup ===
Round	Date	Opponent	Venue	Result	Attendance	Goalscorers
R1	16 November 1996	Kidderminster Harriers	H	4–1	4,651	Macauley, Murphy (2), Lightfoot
R2	7 December 1996	Hull City	A	5–1	3,756	Garvey, Murphy, Adebola, S Smith, Brien (own goal)
R3	14 January 1997	Wimbledon	H	1–1	5,011	Westwood
R3R	21 January 1997	Wimbledon	A	0–2	4,951	

=== League Cup ===
Round	Date	Opponent	Venue	Result	Attendance	Goalscorers
R1 1st Leg	20 August 1996	Port Vale	A	0–1	5,236	
R1 2nd Leg	3 September 1996	Port Vale	H	1–5 (lost 1–6 on agg)	4,471	Adebola

=== Football League Trophy ===
Round	Date	Opponent	Venue	Result	Attendance	Goalscorers
NR2	28 January 1997	Plymouth Argyle	A	1–0	2,216	
NQF	4 February 1997	Blackpool	H	1–0	3,033	
NSF	28 January 1997	Stockport County	H	1–1 (lost 3–5 on pens)	3,529	

== Squad ==
Note: Flags indicate national team as defined under FIFA eligibility rules; some limited exceptions apply. Players may hold more than one non-FIFA nationality.

No.	Pos.	Nation	Player
—	GK	(Nigeria) NGA	Ademola Bankole
—	GK	(England) ENG	Neil Cutler
—	GK	(England) ENG	Mark Gayle
—	GK	(Australia) AUS	Jason Kearton
—	GK	(Australia) AUS	Steve Mautone (on loan from West Ham United)
—	GK	(England) ENG	Martin Taylor (on loan from Derby County)
—	DF	(England) ENG	Billy Barr
—	DF	(England) ENG	Peter Billing
—	DF	(England) ENG	Ryan Kirby
—	DF	(England) ENG	Chris Lightfoot
—	DF	(England) ENG	Steve Macauley
—	DF	(England) ENG	Steve Pope
—	DF	(England) ENG	Shaun Smith
—	DF	(England) ENG	Lee Unsworth
—	DF	(England) ENG	Ashley Westwood
—	MF	(England) ENG	Phil Charnock

No.	Pos.	Nation	Player
—	MF	(England) ENG	Jamie Collins
—	MF	(England) ENG	Steve Garvey
—	MF	(England) ENG	Seth Johnson
—	MF	(England) ENG	Brian Launders
—	MF	(England) ENG	Danny Murphy
—	MF	(Wales) WAL	Robbie Savage
—	MF	(England) ENG	Kevin Street
—	MF	(England) ENG	Francis Tierney
—	MF	(England) ENG	Gareth Whalley
—	FW	(Nigeria) NGA	Dele Adebola
—	FW	(England) ENG	Steve Anthrobus
—	FW	(England) ENG	Lee Ellison
—	FW	(England) ENG	Colin Little
—	FW	(England) ENG	Jamie Moralee
—	FW	(England) ENG	Mark Rivers
—	FW	(Wales) WAL	Peter Smith
