= 2002–03 Crewe Alexandra F.C. season =

Crewe Alexandra
2002–03 season
- Chairman: John Bowler
- Manager: Dario Gradi
- Stadium: Gresty Road
- Football League Second Division: 2nd
- FA Cup: Third Round
- League Cup: Second Round
- League Trophy: Quarter Final

The 2002–03 season, their 80th in the English Football League, saw Crewe Alexandra compete in the Football League Second Division where they finished in 2nd position with 86 points, gaining automatic promotion to the First Division.

== Final league table ==
| Pos | Team | Pld | W | D | L | GF | GA | GD | Pts | Promotion or relegation |
|---|---|---|---|---|---|---|---|---|---|---|
| 1 | Wigan Athletic (C, P) | 46 | 29 | 13 | 4 | 68 | 25 | +43 | 100 | Promotion to Football League First Division |
| 2 | Crewe Alexandra (P) | 46 | 25 | 11 | 10 | 76 | 40 | +36 | 86 | Promotion to Football League First Division |
| 3 | Bristol City | 46 | 24 | 11 | 11 | 79 | 48 | +31 | 83 | Qualification for the Second Division play-offs |
| 4 | Queens Park Rangers | 46 | 24 | 11 | 11 | 69 | 45 | +24 | 83 | Qualification for the Second Division play-offs |
| 5 | Oldham Athletic | 46 | 22 | 16 | 8 | 68 | 38 | +30 | 82 | Qualification for the Second Division play-offs |

Rules for classification: In the Football League goals scored (GF) takes precedence over goal difference (GD).
(C) Champions; (P) Promoted

== Results ==
Crewe Alexandra's score comes first

=== Legend ===
| Win | Draw | Loss |

=== Football League Second Division ===
| Match | Date | Opponent | Venue | Result | Attendance | Scorers |
|---|---|---|---|---|---|---|
| 1 | 10 August 2002 | Northampton Town | A | 1–1 | 5,694 | Sorvel |
| 2 | 13 August 2002 | Notts County | H | 0–3 | 6,141 | |
| 3 | 17 August 2002 | Colchester United | H | 2–0 | 5,138 | Hulse, Bell |
| 4 | 24 August 2002 | Huddersfield Town | A | 1–1 | 8,447 | Hulse |
| 5 | 27 August 2002 | Cheltenham Town | H | 1–0 | 5,488 | Jack |
| 6 | 31 August 2002 | Mansfield Town | A | 5–0 | 4,138 | Walker, Jack, Hulse, Foster, Lunt |
| 7 | 7 September 2002 | Chesterfield | H | 0–0 | 5,837 | |
| 8 | 14 September 2002 | Peterborough United | A | 0–0 | 4,345 | |
| 9 | 17 September 2002 | Wycombe Wanderers | A | 2–1 | 4,909 | Hulse (2) |
| 10 | 21 September 2002 | Tranmere Rovers | H | 2–0 | 6,875 | Hulse, Curtis (o.g.) |
| 11 | 28 September 2002 | Cardiff City | A | 1–2 | 13,208 | Hulse |
| 12 | 5 October 2002 | Queens Park Rangers | H | 2–0 | 7,683 | Jones (2) |
| 13 | 12 October 2002 | Stockport County | A | 4–1 | 6,468 | Lunt, Jones, Hulse (2) |
| 14 | 19 October 2002 | Plymouth Argyle | H | 0–1 | 6,733 | |
| 15 | 26 October 2002 | Port Vale | A | 2–1 | 6,374 | Hulse (2) |
| 16 | 29 October 2002 | Luton Town | H | 0–1 | 6,030 | |
| 17 | 2 November 2002 | Wigan Athletic | A | 0–2 | 7,086 | |
| 18 | 9 November 2002 | Brentford | H | 2–1 | 5,663 | Hulse (2) |
| 19 | 23 November 2002 | Blackpool | H | 3–0 | 7,019 | Hulse, Sodje, Tierney |
| 20 | 30 November 2002 | Bristol City | A | 2–2 | 12,585 | Hulse, Foster |
| 21 | 14 December 2002 | Barnsley | H | 2–0 | 5,633 | Jack, Foster |
| 22 | 21 December 2002 | Swindon Town | A | 3–1 | 4,957 | Foster, Ashton, Jack |
| 23 | 26 December 2002 | Cheltenham Town | A | 4–0 | 5,548 | Ashton, Jack, Brammer, Vaughan |
| 24 | 29 December 2002 | Oldham Athletic | H | 1–2 | 9,006 | Hulse |
| 25 | 1 January 2003 | Mansfield Town | H | 2–0 | 6,931 | Walton, Miles |
| 26 | 11 January 2003 | Colchester United | A | 2–1 | 2,949 | Jones (2) |
| 27 | 18 January 2003 | Huddersfield Town | H | 1–0 | 5,819 | Jones |
| 28 | 25 January 2003 | Oldham Athletic | A | 3–1 | 7,579 | Hulse (2), Ashton |
| 29 | 1 February 2003 | Northampton Town | H | 3–3 | 6,164 | Jones (2), Vaughan |
| 30 | 4 February 2003 | Notts County | A | 2–2 | 3,875 | Jones (2), Hulse |
| 31 | 8 February 2003 | Brentford | A | 2–1 | 5,424 | Lunt (2) |
| 32 | 22 February 2003 | Chesterfield | A | 2–0 | 3,956 | Jack, Wright |
| 33 | 25 February 2003 | Wigan Athletic | H | 0–1 | 8,917 | |
| 34 | 1 March 2003 | Peterborough United | H | 0–1 | 5,704 | |
| 35 | 4 March 2003 | Wycombe Wanderers | H | 4–2 | 5,398 | Lunt, Hulse, Ashton (2) |
| 36 | 8 March 2003 | Tranmere Rovers | A | 1–2 | 8,670 | Hulse |
| 37 | 15 March 2003 | Port Vale | H | 1–1 | 8,146 | Sorvel |
| 38 | 18 March 2003 | Plymouth Argyle | A | 3–1 | 7,777 | Jack, Ashton (2) |
| 39 | 22 March 2003 | Luton Town | A | 4–0 | 6,607 | Ashton (2), Jack, Vaughan |
| 40 | 29 March 2003 | Stockport County | H | 1–0 | 7,336 | Jack |
| 41 | 12 April 2003 | Blackpool | A | 1–0 | 7,623 | Lunt |
| 42 | 15 April 2003 | Bristol City | H | 1–1 | 7,901 | Lunt |
| 43 | 19 April 2003 | Swindon Town | H | 0–1 | 6,384 | |
| 44 | 21 April 2003 | Barnsley | A | 2–1 | 9,369 | Sorvel, Hulse |
| 45 | 26 April 2003 | Queens Park Rangers | A | 0–0 | 16,921 | |
| 46 | 3 May 2003 | Cardiff City | H | 1–1 | 9,562 | Walker |

=== FA Cup ===
| Match | Date | Opponent | Venue | Result | Attendance | Scorers |
|---|---|---|---|---|---|---|
| R1 | 16 November 2002 | Port Vale | A | 1–0 | 5,507 | Ashton |
| R2 | 7 December 2002 | Mansfield Town | H | 3–0 | 4,563 | Ashton, Brammer, Rix |
| R3 | 4 January 2003 | Bournemouth | A | 0–0 | 7,252 | |
| R3 Replay | 14 January 2003 | Bournemouth | H | 2 – 2 (1 – 3 pens) | 4,540 | Jones, Sodje |

=== Football League Cup ===
| Match | Date | Opponent | Venue | Result | Attendance | Scorers |
|---|---|---|---|---|---|---|
| R1 | 10 September 2002 | Port Vale | A | 2–0 | 3,765 | Jack (2) |
| R2 | 1 October 2002 | Manchester City | A | 2–3 | 21,820 | Jack, Hulse |

=== Football League Trophy ===
| Match | Date | Opponent | Venue | Result | Attendance | Scorers |
|---|---|---|---|---|---|---|
| R1 | 22 October 2002 | Mansfield Town | A | 4–0 | 1,874 | Jack, Hulse (3) |
| R2 | 12 November 2002 | Blackpool | H | 2–0 | 2,600 | Jack, Ashton |
| QF | 10 December 2002 | Doncaster Rovers | H | 8–0 | 2,189 | Vaughan, Ashton (3), Jack (2), Lunt, Jones |
| SF | 29 January 2003 | Shrewsbury Town | A | 2–4 | 4,646 | Hulse, Ashton |

== Squad statistics ==
| No. | Pos. | Name | League | | FA Cup | | League Cup | | Other | | Total | |
| No. | Pos. | Name | Apps | Goals | Apps | Goals | Apps | Goals | Apps | Goals | Apps | Goals |
|---|---|---|---|---|---|---|---|---|---|---|---|---|
| 1 | GK | (Nigeria) Ademola Bankole | 2(1) | 0 | 0(1) | 0 | 0 | 0 | 4 | 0 | 6(2) | 0 |
| 2 | DF | (England) David Wright | 31 | 1 | 4 | 0 | 1 | 0 | 3(1) | 0 | 39(1) | 1 |
| 3 | DF | (England) Richard Walker | 31(5) | 2 | 1(1) | 0 | 2 | 0 | 4 | 0 | 38(6) | 2 |
| 4 | MF | (England) Kenny Lunt | 46 | 7 | 4 | 0 | 2 | 0 | 4 | 2 | 56 | 9 |
| 5 | DF | (England) Dave Walton | 27(1) | 1 | 4 | 0 | 0(1) | 0 | 0 | 0 | 31(2) | 1 |
| 6 | DF | (England) Stephen Foster | 35 | 4 | 3 | 0 | 1 | 0 | 4 | 0 | 43 | 4 |
| 7 | FW | (England) Colin Little | 3(3) | 0 | 0 | 0 | 1 | 0 | 0 | 0 | 4(3) | 0 |
| 8 | MF | (England) Dave Brammer | 41 | 1 | 4 | 1 | 2 | 0 | 2 | 0 | 49 | 1 |
| 9 | FW | (England) Rob Hulse | 35(3) | 22 | 1 | 0 | 1 | 1 | 2 | 4 | 39(3) | 27 |
| 10 | FW | (England) Dean Ashton | 24(14) | 9 | 1(1) | 2 | 1 | 0 | 3 | 5 | 34(15) | 15 |
| 11 | FW | (Saint Vincent and the Grenadines) Rodney Jack | 35(3) | 9 | 2 | 0 | 2 | 0 | 3 | 0 | 42(3) | 9 |
| 12 | MF | (England) Neil Sorvel | 39(4) | 3 | 4 | 0 | 2 | 0 | 4 | 0 | 49(4) | 3 |
| 13 | GK | (Trinidad and Tobago) Clayton Ince | 43 | 0 | 4 | 0 | 2 | 0 | 0 | 0 | 48 | 0 |
| 14 | MF | (Wales) David Vaughan | 28(4) | 3 | 4 | 0 | 1 | 0 | 2 | 1 | 35(4) | 4 |
| 15 | MF | (England) Wayne Collins | 0 | 0 | 0 | 0 | 0 | 0 | 0(1) | 0 | 0(1) | 0 |
| 16 | DF | (Nigeria) Efe Sodje | 23(6) | 1 | 0(3) | 1 | 2 | 0 | 2 | 0 | 27(9) | 2 |
| 17 | MF | (Northern Ireland) Steve Jones | 18(12) | 9 | 2(1) | 1 | 0(1) | 0 | 2(2) | 1 | 23(16) | 11 |
| 18 | DF | (England) Chris McCready | 6(2) | 0 | 0 | 0 | 0 | 1 | 0 | 0 | 7(3) | 0 |
| 19 | MF | (England) Ben Rix | 17(6) | 0 | 2(1) | 1 | 0 | 0 | 1(1) | 0 | 20(8) | 0 |
| 20 | MF | (England) Lee Bell | 3(13) | 1 | 0(2) | 0 | 0 | 0 | 1(3) | 0 | 4(18) | 0 |
| 21 | FW | (England) Paul Edwards | 0(2) | 0 | 0 | 0 | 0 | 0 | 0 | 0 | 0(2) | 0 |
| 22 | GK | (England) Stuart Tomlinson | 0(1) | 0 | 0 | 0 | 0 | 0 | 0 | 0 | 0(1) | 0 |
| 23 | MF | (England) Alex Morris | 0 | 0 | 0 | 0 | 0 | 0 | 0 | 0 | 0 | 0 |
| 23 | DF | (Saint Kitts and Nevis) Sagi Burton | 1 | 0 | 0 | 0 | 0 | 0 | 0 | 0 | 1 | 0 |
| 24 | MF | (England) James Robinson | 0(1) | 0 | 0 | 0 | 0 | 0 | 0 | 0 | 0(1) | 0 |
| 25 | FW | (England) John Miles | 0(5) | 1 | 2 | 0 | 1 | 0 | 0(2) | 0 | 3(7) | 1 |
| 26 | FW | (England) Michael Higdon | 0 | 0 | 0 | 0 | 0 | 0 | 0 | 0 | 0 | 0 |
| 27 | DF | (England) Adam Yates | 0 | 0 | 0 | 0 | 0 | 0 | 0 | 0 | 0 | 0 |
| 28 | FW | (England) Andy White | 0(2) | 0 | 0 | 0 | 0 | 0 | 0 | 0 | 0(2) | 0 |
| 29 | DF | (England) Paul Tierney | 14(3) | 1 | 2 | 0 | 0 | 0 | 3 | 0 | 19(3) | 1 |
| 30 | GK | (Australia) Danny Milosevic | 1 | 0 | 0 | 0 | 0 | 0 | 0 | 0 | 1 | 0 |
| 31 | MF | (England) Stefan Oakes | 3(4) | 0 | 0 | 0 | 0 | 0 | 0 | 0 | 3(4) | 0 |
| 33 | FW | (England) Luke Varney | 0 | 0 | 0 | 0 | 0 | 0 | 0 | 0 | 0 | 0 |
| 40 | FW | (Republic of Ireland) Jonathan Walters | 0 | 0 | 0 | 0 | 0 | 0 | 0 | 0 | 0 | 0 |
