= 1999–2000 Crewe Alexandra F.C. season =

Crewe Alexandra
1999–2000 season
- Chairman: John Bowler
- Manager: Dario Gradi
- Stadium: Gresty Road
- First Division: 19th
- FA Cup: Third round
- League Cup: Third round
- Top goalscorer: League: Rivers (7); All: Rivers (9)
- Average home league attendance: 6,248

During the 1999–2000 English football season, their 77th in the English Football League, Crewe Alexandra F.C. competed in the Football League First Division where they finished in 19th position on 51 points.

== Final league table ==
Pos	Team	Pld	W	D	L	GF	GA	GD	Pts
17	Stockport County	46	13	15	18	55	67	−12	54
18	Portsmouth	46	13	12	21	55	66	−11	51
19	Crewe Alexandra	46	14	9	23	46	67	−21	51
20	Grimsby Town	46	13	12	21	41	67	−26	51
21	West Bromwich Albion	46	10	19	17	43	60	−17	49

Rules for classification: 1) Points; 2) Goal difference; 3) Goals scored

== Results ==
Crewe Alexandra's score comes first

=== Legend ===
Win	Draw	Loss

=== Football League Division One ===
Match	Date	Opponent	Venue	Result	Attendance	Scorers
1	7 August 1999	Crystal Palace	A	1–1	13,664	Rivers 84'
2	21 August 1999	Walsall	A	4–1	6,238	Charnock 14', Rivers 55', Lunt 56', Little 71'
3	27 August 1999	Grimsby Town	H	1–1	5,440	Sorvel 84'
4	30 August 1999	Birmingham City	A	1–5	24,085	Cramb 3'
5	11 September 1999	Norwich City	A	1–2	13,172	Cramb 31'
6	18 September 1999	Swindon	H	2–1	5,280	Street 13', Smith 81' (pen)
7	25 September 1999	Fulham	A	0–3	12,156	
8	3 October 1999	Tranmere Rovers	H	0–2	6,169	
9	9 October 1999	Sheffield United	H	1–0	5,304	Sorvel 15'
10	16 October 1999	Stockport County	A	1–2	7,571	Sorvel 16'
11	19 October 1999	Bolton Wanderers	A	2–2	12,676	Jack 39', 87'
12	23 October 1999	Barnsley	H	0–1	5,421	
13	26 October 1999	Fulham	H	1–1	5,493	Little 45'
14	30 October 1999	Tranmere Rovers	A	0–2	5,987	
15	2 November 1999	Charlton Athletic	H	0–2	4,741	
16	5 November 1999	Port Vale	A	0–1	3,500	
17	20 November 1999	Portsmouth	A	2–0	11,550	Jack 34', Tait 63'
18	23 November 1999	Blackburn Rovers	H	0–0	6,495	
19	27 November 1999	Ipswich Town	A	1–2	15,211	Rivers 75'
20	4 December 1999	Crystal Palace	H	2–0	4,923	Tait 12', Macualey 34'
21	7 December 1999	West Bromwich Albion	H	2–0	5,419	Tait 48', Sorvel 84'
22	14 December 1999	Wolverhampton Wanderers	H	1–0	6,018	Tait 83'
23	18 December 1999	Nottingham Forest	A	0–1	15,286	
24	26 December 1999	Huddersfield Town	H	1–1	8,106	Little 63'
25	28 December 1999	Queens Park Rangers	A	0–1	12,011	
26	3 January 2000	Manchester City	H	1–1	10,066	Jack 73'
27	15 January 2000	Charlton Athletic	A	0–1	19,125	
28	22 January 2000	Walsall	H	2–3	6,275	Macualey 34' (pen), Tait 67'
29	22 January 2000	Grimsby Town	A	1–1	6,147	Lunt 51'
30	5 February 2000	Birmingham City	H	2–3	6,289	Macualey 19', 90'
31	12 February 2000	West Bromwich Albion	A	0–1	12,406	
32	19 February 2000	Ipswich Town	H	1–2	6,393	Tait 64'
33	26 February 2000	Swindon Town	A	1–0	5,003	Cramb 54'
34	4 March 2000	Norwich City	H	1–0	5,450	Sorvel 5'
35	7 March 2000	Port Vale	H	2–1	8,044	Cramb 14', Lunt 88'
36	12 March 2000	Blackburn Rovers	A	1–0	16,057	Cramb 80'
37	18 March 2000	Portsmouth	H	1–3	6,188	Cramb 57'
38	21 March 2000	Wolverhampton Wanderers	A	0–2	20,444	
39	29 March 2000	Huddersfield Town	A	0–3	14,014	
40	1 April 2000	Nottingham Forest	H	0–3	7,014	
41	8 April 2000	Manchester City	A	0–4	32,433	
42	15 April 2000	Queens Park Rangers	H	2–1	4,741	Smith 18' (pen), Rivers 55'
43	22 April 2000	Stockport County	H	3–2	5,813	Rivers 6', 58', Lightfoot 9'
44	24 April 2000	Sheffield United	A	1–1	9,923	Little 87'
45	29 April 2000	Bolton Wanderers	H	1–3	8,015	Rivers 30'
46	7 May 2000	Barnsley	A	2–0	17,611	Sorvel 55', Hulse 79'

=== League Cup ===
Round	Date	Opponent	Venue	Result	Attendance	Scorers
R1 1st Leg	10 August 1999	Hartlepool United	A	3–3	1,836	Little 11', 54', Cramb 69'
R1 2nd Leg	24 August 1999	Hartlepool United	H	1–0	5,095	Little 88'
R2 1st Leg	14 September 1999	Ipswich Town	H	2–1	4,759	Rivers 66', Little 86'
R2 2nd Leg	21 September 1999	Ipswich Town	A	1–1	9,869	Rivers 86'
R3	13 October 1999	Tottenham Hotspur	A	1–3	25,486	Smith 70' (pen)

=== FA Cup ===
Round	Date	Opponent	Venue	Result	Attendance	Scorers
R3	11 December 1999	Bradford City	H	1–2	6,571	Little 75'

== Squad ==
Appearances for competitive matches only

Pos.	Name	League		FA Cup		League Cup		Total	
Pos.	Name	Apps	Goals	Apps	Goals	Apps	Goals	Apps	Goals
DF	(England) Marcus Bignot	25(2)	0	1	0	3	0	29(2)	0
DF	(England) Paul Boertien	2	0	0	0	0	0	2	0
MF	(England) Phil Charnock	14(2)	1	0	0	5	0	19(2)	1
MF	(England) Jamie Collins	8(5)	0	0(1)	0	0(1)	0	8(7)	0
FW	(Scotland) Colin Cramb	33(4)	6	1	0	5	1	39(4)	7
MF	(England) Neil Critchley	0(1)	0	0	0	0	0	0(1)	0
DF	(England) Mark Foran	11(2)	0	0	0	2	0	13(2)	0
FW	(England) John Grant	1(3)	0	0	0	0(2)	0	1(5)	0
FW	(England) Rob Hulse	0(4)	1	0	0	0	0	0(4)	1
GK	(Trinidad and Tobago) Clayton Ince	0(1)	0	0	0	0	0	0(1)	0
FW	(Saint Vincent and the Grenadines) Rodney Jack	21(2)	4	0	0	2	0	23(2)	4
GK	(Australia) Jason Kearton	46	0	1	0	5	0	52	0
MF	(England) Gareth Liddle	1	0	0	0	0	0	1	0
DF	(England) Chris Lightfoot	16(4)	1	0	0	0(1)	0	16(5)	1
FW	(England) Colin Little	33(4)	4	1	1	4(1)	4	38(5)	9
MF	(England) Kenny Lunt	39(4)	3	1	0	5	0	45(4)	3
DF	(England) Steve Macauley	35(2)	4	1	0	4	0	40(2)	4
FW	(England) Jon Newby	5(1)	0	0	0	0	0	5(1)	0
FW	(England) Mark Rivers	29(3)	7	0	0	4	2	33(3)	7
FW	(England) Peter Smith	0(6)	0	0	0	0	0	0(6)	0
DF	(England) Shaun Smith	30(1)	2	1	0	5	1	36(1)	3
MF	(England) Neil Sorvel	46	6	1	0	5	0	52	6
MF	(England) Kevin Street	20(8)	1	1	0	0(2)	0	21(10)	1
FW	(England) Paul Tait	19(13)	6	1	0	0	0	20(13)	6
DF	(England) Lee Unsworth	3(5)	0	0	0	2	0	5(5)	0
DF	(England) Dave Walton	8(3)	0	0	0	0	0	8(3)	0
DF	(England) Stephen Wright	17(5)	0	0	0	1	0	18(5)	0
DF	(England) David Wright	44(1)	0	1	0	3	0	48(1)	0

== See also ==
- 1999–2000 in English football
