= 2003–04 Crewe Alexandra F.C. season =

Crewe Alexandra
2003–04 season
- Chairman: John Bowler
- Manager: Dario Gradi
- Stadium: Gresty Road
- First Division: 18th
- FA Cup: Third round
- League Cup: Second round
- Top goalscorer: League: Dean Ashton (19); All: Dean Ashton (20)
- Average home league attendance: 7,741

During the 2003–04 season, Crewe Alexandra participated in the Football League First Division, their 81st in the English Football League.

== Season summary ==
Crewe finished in 18th place, a satisfactory position for a side returning to the First Division. Striker Dean Ashton scored 19 goals to make him the league's fourth-highest scorer, attracting attention from many larger clubs.

== Kit ==
Reebok remained Crewe's kit manufacturers, and introduced a new kit for the season. L. C. Charles continued as kit sponsors for the sixth consecutive season.

== Final league table ==
Pos	Team	Pld	W	D	L	GF	GA	GD	Pts
16	Watford	46	15	12	19	54	68	−14	57
17	Rotherham United	46	13	15	18	53	61	−8	54
18	Crewe Alexandra	46	14	11	21	57	66	−9	53
19	Burnley	46	13	14	19	60	77	−17	53
20	Derby County	46	13	13	20	53	67	−14	52

Source: Soccerway
Rules for classification: 1) points; 2) goal difference; 3) number of goals scored.

== Results ==
Crewe Alexandra's score comes first

=== Legend ===
Win	Draw	Loss

=== Football League First Division ===
Date	Opponent	Venue	Result	Attendance	Scorers
9 August 2003	Wimbledon	A	1–3	1,145	Brammer
16 August 2003	Ipswich Town	H	1–0	6,982	Lunt
23 August 2003	Millwall	A	1–1	9,504	Ashton
25 August 2003	Walsall	H	1–0	7,026	S Jones
30 August 2003	Burnley	A	0–1	11,495	
13 September 2003	Rotherham United	A	2–0	5,495	Ashton (pen), Walker
16 September 2003	West Ham United	H	0–3	9,575	
20 September 2003	Nottingham Forest	H	3–1	8,685	Lunt, Ashton, S Jones
27 September 2003	Cardiff City	A	0–3	14,385	
1 October 2003	Coventry City	A	0–2	11,557	
4 October 2003	Watford	H	0–1	7,055	
14 October 2003	Bradford City	H	2–2	5,867	S Jones, Ashton
18 October 2003	Derby County	H	3–0	8,656	Barrowman, Ashton, Rix
21 October 2003	Preston North End	H	2–1	7,012	Lunt, Foster
25 October 2003	Stoke City	A	1–1	17,569	S Jones
1 November 2003	Reading	H	1–0	7,091	S Jones
4 November 2003	Sheffield United	A	0–2	17,396	
8 November 2003	Gillingham	A	0–2	6,923	
22 November 2003	Sunderland	H	3–0	9,807	Ashton, S Jones (2)
29 November 2003	Norwich City	A	0–1	16,367	
6 December 2003	Gillingham	H	1–1	6,271	S Jones
9 December 2003	Crystal Palace	A	3–1	12,259	Ashton (2), Varney
13 December 2003	West Bromwich Albion	A	2–2	22,825	S Jones, Wright
20 December 2003	Wigan Athletic	H	2–3	7,873	B Jones, S Jones
26 December 2003	Burnley	H	3–1	9,512	Ashton, S Jones (2)
28 December 2003	Preston North End	A	0–0	15,830	
10 January 2004	Wimbledon	H	1–0	20,473	S Jones
17 January 2004	Ipswich Town	A	4–6	22,071	Ashton, McGreal (own goal), Richards (own goal), Robinson
31 January 2004	Millwall	H	1–2	6,685	Roberts
7 February 2004	Walsall	A	1–1	6,871	Foster
21 February 2004	Bradford City	A	1–2	9,935	Rix
24 February 2004	Sheffield United	H	0–1	6,525	
3 March 2004	Derby County	A	0–0	19,861	
6 March 2004	Wigan Athletic	A	3–2	8,367	Ashton (3, 2 pens)
13 March 2004	West Bromwich Albion	H	1–2	8,335	Ashton
17 March 2004	West Ham United	A	2–4	31,158	S Jones
20 March 2004	Cardiff City	H	0–1	6,650	
23 March 2004	Stoke City	H	2–0	10,014	Hall (own goal), Lunt
27 March 2004	Nottingham Forest	A	0–2	24,347	
3 April 2004	Rotherham United	H	0–0	6,749	
10 April 2004	Watford	A	1–2	18,041	Ashton (pen)
12 April 2004	Coventry City	H	3–1	7,475	Higdon, Symes, Ashton (pen)
17 April 2004	Reading	A	1–1	14,729	Lunt
24 April 2004	Crystal Palace	H	2–3	8,136	Ashton, Lunt
1 May 2004	Sunderland	A	1–1	25,311	Ashton
9 May 2004	Norwich City	A	1–3	9,833	Ashton

=== FA Cup ===
Round	Date	Opponent	Venue	Result	Attendance	Goalscorers
R3	3 January 2004	Telford United	H	0–1	7,085	

=== League Cup ===
Round	Date	Opponent	Venue	Result	Attendance	Goalscorers
R1	12 August 2003	Wrexham	H	2–0	3,152	Ashton (pen), S Jones
R2	23 September 2003	Leicester City	A	0–1	27,675	

== Squad ==
Note: Flags indicate national team as defined under FIFA eligibility rules; some limited exceptions apply. Players may hold more than one non-FIFA nationality.

No.	Pos.	Nation	Player
1	GK	TRI	Clayton Ince
2	DF	ENG	David Wright
3	DF	ENG	Richard Walker
4	MF	ENG	Kenny Lunt
5	DF	ENG	Adie Moses
6	DF	ENG	Stephen Foster
7	MF	ENG	Neil Sorvel
8	MF	ENG	Dave Brammer
9	FW	NIR	Steve Jones
10	FW	ENG	Dean Ashton
11	MF	WAL	David Vaughan
12	MF	ENG	Lee Bell
13	GK	NGA	Ademola Bankole
14	MF	ENG	Ben Rix
15	FW	ENG	Luke Varney
16	DF	ENG	Anthony Tonkin
17	MF	ENG	James Robinson
18	DF	ENG	Chris McCready

No.	Pos.	Nation	Player
19	MF	ENG	Justin Cochrane
20	FW	SCO	Allan Smart
21	FW	ENG	Paul Edwards
22	GK	ENG	Stuart Tomlinson
23	MF	ENG	Alex Morris
24	FW	ENG	Matthew Platt
25	DF	ENG	Matt Garner
26	MF	ENG	Michael Higdon
27	DF	ENG	Adam Yates
28	MF	ENG	Gary Roberts
29	DF	ENG	Billy Jones
30	FW	ENG	Kyle Wilson
31	FW	ENG	Ian Jeffs
32	DF	ENG	Tom Betts
33	FW	LBY	Éamon Zayed (on loan from Bray Wanderers)
34	MF	ENG	Craig Hignett (on loan from Leicester City)
35	GK	ENG	Ben Williams (on loan from Manchester United)
36	FW	ENG	Michael Symes (on loan from Everton)

=== Left club during season ===
Note: Flags indicate national team as defined under FIFA eligibility rules; some limited exceptions apply. Players may hold more than one non-FIFA nationality.

No. / Pos. / Nation / Player; 28 / FW / IRL / Jon Walters (on loan from Bolton Wanderers)	No. / Pos. / Nation / Player; 28 / FW / ENG / Andrew Barrowman (on loan from Birmingham City)

== Transfers ==
=== In ===
- (England) Adie Moses – (England) Barnsley, free, 8 July
- (England) Anthony Tonkin – (England) Stockport County, £150,000, August
- (Scotland) Allan Smart – (Scotland) Dundee United

=== Out ===
- (England) Dave Walton – (England) Derby County, free

== Top scorers ==
- (England) Dean Ashton, 19
- (Northern Ireland) Steve Jones, 15
