= 2004–05 Crewe Alexandra F.C. season =

Crewe Alexandra
2004–05 season
- Chairman: John Bowler
- Manager: Dario Gradi
- Stadium: Alexandra Stadium
- Championship: 21st
- FA Cup: Third round
- League Cup: Third round
- Top goalscorer: League: Ashton (18); All: Ashton (20)
- Average home league attendance: 7,143
Home colours

During the 2004–05 English football season, Crewe Alexandra F.C. competed in the Football League Championship, their 82nd in the English Football League.

== Season summary ==
At the start of the 2004–05 season, Crewe were rated one of the likeliest teams to be relegated. In the event, they put in a good showing in the first half of the season; comfortably in the top half of the table, but after selling Dean Ashton to Norwich City for a record £3 million in the January 2005 transfer window, Crewe failed to win any more games until the final match of the season, when they defeated Coventry City 2–1 and narrowly escaped relegation on goal difference.

== Final league table ==
Pos	Team	Pld	W	D	L	GF	GA	GD	Pts	Promotion, qualification or relegation
19	Coventry City	46	13	13	20	61	73	−12	52	
20	Brighton & Hove Albion	46	13	12	21	40	65	−25	51	
21	Crewe Alexandra	46	12	14	20	66	86	−20	50	
22	Gillingham (R)	46	12	14	20	45	66	−21	50	Relegation to Football League One
23	Nottingham Forest (R)	46	9	17	20	42	66	−24	44	Relegation to Football League One

Updated to match(es) played on 9 December 2011. Source: Football League Tables
Rules for classification: 1) points; 2) goal difference; 3) number of goals scored.
(R) Relegated

== Results ==
Crewe Alexandra's score comes first

=== Legend ===
Win	Draw	Loss

=== Football League Championship ===
Date	Opponent	Venue	Result	Attendance	Scorers
7 August 2004	Cardiff City	H	2–2	7,339	Ashton (pen), Higdon
10 August 2004	Sunderland	A	1–3	22,341	Rivers
14 August 2004	Nottingham Forest	A	2–2	24,201	Rivers (2)
21 August 2004	West Ham United	H	2–3	7,857	Ashton (2)
28 August 2004	Derby County	A	4–2	24,436	Jones (2), Vaughan, Ashton
11 September 2004	Burnley	A	0–3	11,274	
14 September 2004	Queens Park Rangers	H	0–2	5,682	
18 September 2004	Leeds United	H	2–2	9,095	Ashton (pen), Jones
25 September 2004	Preston North End	A	0–1	11,823	
28 September 2004	Rotherham United	A	3–2	4,498	Ashton (2, 1 pen), Lunt
2 October 2004	Watford	H	3–0	6,382	Jones, Sorvel (2)
16 October 2004	Brighton & Hove Albion	H	3–1	6,811	Lunt, White, Higdon
19 October 2004	Wigan Athletic	A	1–4	7,547	Jones
23 October 2004	Reading	A	0–4	13,630	
29 October 2004	Sheffield United	H	2–3	7,131	Foster, Thirlwell (own goal)
2 November 2004	Leicester City	H	2–2	6,849	Rivers, Otsemobor
6 November 2004	Brighton & Hove Albion	A	3–1	6,163	Ashton (2), Rivers
13 November 2004	Stoke City	A	0–1	17,640	
20 November 2004	Gillingham	H	4–1	6,128	Vaughan, Ashton (2), Jones
27 November 2004	Coventry City	A	1–0	12,823	Ashton (pen)
30 November 2004	Millwall	H	2–1	5,409	Ashton, Varney
4 December 2004	Ipswich Town	H	2–2	7,236	Ashton (2)
11 December 2004	Plymouth Argyle	H	3–0	6,823	Lunt, Ashton, Doumbe (own goal)
18 December 2004	Wolverhampton Wanderers	A	1–1	25,340	Lescott (own goal)
28 December 2004	Queens Park Rangers	A	2–1	15,770	Walker, Rivers
1 January 2005	Leeds United	A	2–0	32,302	Ashton, Rivers
3 January 2005	Preston North End	H	1–2	8,667	Walker
15 January 2005	Watford	A	1–3	11,223	Varney
22 January 2005	Rotherham United	H	1–1	6,382	White
5 February 2005	Leicester City	A	1–1	27,011	White
12 February 2005	Wigan Athletic	H	1–3	15,188	White
15 February 2005	Burnley	H	1–1	7,718	Jones
22 February 2005	Reading	H	1–1	5,703	Varney
26 February 2005	Plymouth Argyle	A	0–3	14,918	
5 March 2005	Wolverhampton Wanderers	H	1–4	8,212	Lunt (pen)
8 March 2005	Sheffield United	A	0–4	16,079	
12 March 2005	Sunderland	H	0–1	7,949	
15 March 2005	West Ham United	A	1–1	26,593	Jones
19 March 2005	Cardiff City	A	1–1	10,007	Vaughan
2 April 2005	Nottingham Forest	H	1–1	8,458	Sorvel
5 April 2005	Derby County	H	1–2	8,026	Vaughan
9 April 2005	Millwall	A	3–4	10,767	Lunt (pen), Jones, Varney
16 April 2005	Gillingham	A	1–1	10,315	Vaughan
23 April 2005	Stoke City	H	0–2	9,166	
30 April 2005	Ipswich Town	A	1–5	28,244	Vaughan
8 May 2005	Coventry City	H	2–1	9,269	Higdon, Jones

=== FA Cup ===
Round	Date	Opponent	Venue	Result	Attendance	Goalscorers
R3	8 January 2005	Coventry City	A	0–3	7,629	

=== League Cup ===
Round	Date	Opponent	Venue	Result	Attendance	Goalscorers
R1	24 August 2004	Blackpool	H	4–1	2,994	Jones (2), Rivers, Ashton
R2	21 September 2004	Sunderland	H	3–3 (won 4–2 on pens)	3,804	Jones, Ashton, Foster
R3	26 October 2004	Manchester United	H	0–3	10,103	

== Squad ==
Note: Flags indicate national team as defined under FIFA eligibility rules; some limited exceptions apply. Players may hold more than one non-FIFA nationality.

No.	Pos.	Nation	Player
1	GK	TRI	Clayton Ince
2	DF	ENG	Billy Jones
3	DF	ENG	Richard Walker
4	MF	ENG	Kenny Lunt (captain)
5	DF	ENG	Adrian Moses
6	DF	ENG	Stephen Foster
7	MF	ENG	Neil Sorvel
8	MF	ENG	Justin Cochrane
9	FW	NIR	Steve Jones
11	MF	WAL	David Vaughan
12	MF	ENG	Lee Bell
13	GK	ENG	Ben Williams
14	MF	ENG	Ben Rix
15	FW	ENG	Luke Varney
16	DF	ENG	Anthony Tonkin
18	DF	ENG	Chris McCready

No.	Pos.	Nation	Player
19	MF	ENG	Michael Higdon
20	FW	ENG	Andy White
22	GK	ENG	Stuart Tomlinson
23	MF	ENG	Alex Morris
24	FW	ENG	Matthew Platt
25	DF	ENG	Mark Roberts
26	MF	ENG	Gary Roberts
27	MF	ENG	Lloyd McGowan
28	FW	ENG	Kyle Wilson
29	MF	ENG	Mark Rivers
30	DF	ENG	Ryan Austin
31	DF	ENG	Robert Lloyd
33	DF	ENG	Paul Bignot
35	DF	NIR	Colin Murdock
37	DF	WAL	Darren Moss
38	GK	ENG	Karl Wills

=== Left club during season ===
Note: Flags indicate national team as defined under FIFA eligibility rules; some limited exceptions apply. Players may hold more than one non-FIFA nationality.

No.	Pos.	Nation	Player
32	DF	ENG	Keith Briggs (on loan from Norwich City)
21	FW	ENG	Paul Edwards (to Leek Town)
10	FW	ENG	Dean Ashton (to Norwich City)

No.	Pos.	Nation	Player
34	DF	ENG	Jon Otsemobor (on loan from Liverpool)
17	MF	ENG	James Robinson (to ÍBV)
