= 2005–06 Crewe Alexandra F.C. season =

Crewe Alexandra
2005–06 season
- Chairman: John Bowler
- Manager: Dario Gradi
- Stadium: Alexandra Stadium
- Football League Championship: 22nd (relegated)
- FA Cup: Third round
- League Cup: First round
- Top goalscorer: League: B Jones/Rodgers (6); All: B Jones (7)
- Average home league attendance: 6,731

During the 2005–06 English football season, Crewe Alexandra F.C. competed in the Football League Championship, their 83rd season in the English Football League.

== Season summary ==
In the 2005–06 season, Crewe Alexandra's continued success in the Championship finally came to an end and despite a gallant effort in the second half of the season, the Railwaymen eventually finished in 22nd place and were relegated with Millwall and Brighton. Their relegation was confirmed on 17 April 2006 after a 1–1 draw at home with Cardiff City after Sheffield Wednesday won 2–0 at Brighton. The season did see some highs though with the club securing Algerian international Madjid Bougherra and the former Welsh international Gareth Taylor on loan from Nottingham Forest.

== Final league table ==
| Pos | Team | Pld | W | D | L | GF | GA | GD | Pts | Promotion, qualification or relegation |
|---|---|---|---|---|---|---|---|---|---|---|
| 20 | Derby County | 46 | 10 | 20 | 16 | 53 | 67 | −14 | 50 | |
| 21 | Queens Park Rangers | 46 | 12 | 14 | 20 | 50 | 65 | −15 | 50 | |
| 22 | Crewe Alexandra (R) | 46 | 9 | 15 | 22 | 57 | 86 | −29 | 42 | Relegation to Football League One |
| 23 | Millwall (R) | 46 | 8 | 16 | 22 | 35 | 62 | −27 | 40 | Relegation to Football League One |
| 24 | Brighton & Hove Albion (R) | 46 | 7 | 17 | 22 | 39 | 71 | −32 | 38 | Relegation to Football League One |

Updated to match(es) played on 2 December 2011. Source: RSSSF
Rules for classification: 1) points; 2) goal difference; 3) number of goals scored.
(R) Relegated

== Results ==
Crewe Alexandra's score comes first

=== Legend ===
| Win | Draw | Loss |

=== Football League Championship ===
| Date | Opponent | Venue | Result | Attendance | Scorers |
|---|---|---|---|---|---|
| 6 August 2005 | Burnley | H | 2–1 | 8,006 | B Jones, Vaughan |
| 9 August 2005 | Norwich City | A | 1–1 | 25,116 | Varney |
| 13 August 2005 | Brighton & Hove Albion | A | 2–2 | 6,132 | Rivers, Higdon |
| 20 August 2005 | Leicester City | H | 2–2 | 7,053 | Varney, Rivers |
| 27 August 2005 | Southampton | A | 0–2 | 20,792 | |
| 29 August 2005 | Sheffield United | H | 1–3 | 7,501 | Foster |
| 11 September 2005 | Derby County | H | 1–1 | 5,958 | Rivers |
| 13 September 2005 | Plymouth Argyle | A | 1–1 | 10,460 | Johnson |
| 17 September 2005 | Reading | A | 0–1 | 17,668 | |
| 24 September 2005 | Watford | H | 0–0 | 6,258 | |
| 27 September 2005 | Wolverhampton Wanderers | H | 0–4 | 7,471 | |
| 1 October 2005 | Ipswich Town | A | 1–2 | 23,145 | Vaughan |
| 15 October 2005 | Luton Town | H | 3–1 | 6,604 | B Jones, Lunt, Varney |
| 18 October 2005 | Stoke City | A | 0–2 | 14,080 | |
| 22 October 2005 | Cardiff City | A | 1–6 | 10,815 | Foster |
| 29 October 2005 | Crystal Palace | H | 2–2 | 6,766 | S Jones, Higdon |
| 1 November 2005 | Leeds United | H | 1–0 | 7,220 | Butler (own goal) |
| 5 November 2005 | Millwall | A | 3–1 | 8,120 | S Jones (2), G Roberts |
| 19 November 2005 | Stoke City | H | 1–2 | 8,942 | Johnson |
| 22 November 2005 | Luton Town | A | 1–4 | 7,474 | Walker |
| 26 November 2005 | Burnley | A | 0–3 | 11,151 | |
| 3 December 2005 | Preston North End | H | 0–2 | 6,364 | |
| 10 December 2005 | Norwich City | H | 1–2 | 6,132 | B Jones |
| 17 December 2005 | Leicester City | A | 1–1 | 24,873 | Higdon |
| 26 December 2005 | Hull City | H | 2–2 | 7,942 | Johnson, G Roberts |
| 28 December 2005 | Coventry City | A | 1–1 | 19,045 | Rodgers |
| 31 December 2005 | Queens Park Rangers | H | 3–4 | 5,687 | Johnson, Varney, B Jones |
| 2 January 2006 | Sheffield Wednesday | A | 0–3 | 25,656 | |
| 14 January 2006 | Derby County | A | 1–5 | 22,649 | Vaughan |
| 21 January 2006 | Plymouth Argyle | H | 1–2 | 5,984 | Rodgers |
| 28 January 2006 | Watford | A | 1–4 | 11,722 | Rodgers |
| 4 February 2006 | Reading | H | 3–4 | 6,484 | Bell, Taylor, Lunt (pen) |
| 11 February 2006 | Wolverhampton Wanderers | A | 1–1 | 21,683 | B Jones |
| 14 February 2006 | Ipswich Town | H | 1–2 | 5,686 | S Jones |
| 25 February 2006 | Brighton & Hove Albion | H | 2–1 | 5,925 | Bell, Foster |
| 3 March 2006 | Sheffield United | A | 0–0 | 22,691 | |
| 11 March 2006 | Southampton | H | 1–1 | 6,588 | Rodgers |
| 18 March 2006 | Hull City | A | 0–1 | 21,163 | |
| 25 March 2006 | Coventry City | H | 4–1 | 6,444 | B Jones, Bougherra, Rodgers, Taylor |
| 28 March 2006 | Preston North End | A | 0–1 | 13,170 | |
| 1 April 2006 | Queens Park Rangers | A | 2–1 | 12,877 | Lunt, Vaughan |
| 8 April 2006 | Sheffield Wednesday | H | 2–0 | 8,007 | Taylor (2) |
| 15 April 2006 | Crystal Palace | A | 2–2 | 18,358 | Rodgers, Lunt (pen) |
| 17 April 2006 | Cardiff City | H | 1–1 | 5,865 | Vaughan |
| 22 April 2006 | Leeds United | A | 0–1 | 21,046 | |
| 30 April 2006 | Millwall | H | 4–2 | 5,945 | Johnson, Maynard, Varney, S Jones |

=== FA Cup ===
| Round | Date | Opponent | Venue | Result | Attendance | Goalscorers |
|---|---|---|---|---|---|---|
| R3 | 7 January 2006 | Preston North End | A | 1–2 | 8,380 | B Jones |

=== League Cup ===
| Round | Date | Opponent | Venue | Result | Attendance | Goalscorers |
|---|---|---|---|---|---|---|
| R1 | 23 August 2005 | Lincoln City | A | 1–5 | 2,782 | Walker |

== Squad ==
Note: Flags indicate national team as defined under FIFA eligibility rules; some limited exceptions apply. Players may hold more than one non-FIFA nationality.

| No. | Pos. | Nation | Player |
|---|---|---|---|
| 1 | GK | ENG | Ben Williams |
| 2 | DF | WAL | Darren Moss |
| 3 | DF | ENG | Anthony Tonkin |
| 4 | DF | ENG | Billy Jones |
| 5 | DF | ENG | Adie Moses |
| 6 | DF | ENG | Stephen Foster |
| 7 | MF | ENG | Kenny Lunt |
| 8 | MF | ENG | Justin Cochrane |
| 9 | FW | NIR | Steve Jones |
| 10 | FW | ESP | Juan Ugarte |
| 11 | MF | WAL | David Vaughan |
| 12 | MF | ENG | Lee Bell |
| 13 | GK | ENG | Stuart Tomlinson |
| 14 | MF | ENG | Ben Rix |
| 15 | FW | ENG | Luke Varney |
| 16 | DF | ENG | Richard Walker |
| 18 | DF | ENG | Chris McCready |
| 19 | MF | ENG | Michael Higdon |
| 20 | DF | ENG | Eddie Johnson (on loan from Manchester United) |

| No. | Pos. | Nation | Player |
|---|---|---|---|
| 21 | MF | ENG | Gary Roberts |
| 22 | DF | ENG | Paul Bignot |
| 23 | DF | ENG | Robert Lloyd |
| 24 | FW | ENG | Matt Bailey |
| 25 | DF | ENG | Mark Roberts |
| 26 | MF | ENG | Alex Morris |
| 27 | FW | ENG | Kyle Wilson |
| 28 | MF | NIR | Michael O'Connor |
| 29 | MF | ENG | Andy Bond |
| 30 | FW | ENG | Nicky Maynard |
| 31 | FW | SVK | Pavol Šuhaj |
| 32 | FW | ENG | Luke Rodgers |
| 34 | DF | ENG | Ritchie Sutton |
| 35 | FW | ENG | Tom Pope |
| 36 | MF | ENG | Tony Grant |
| 37 | GK | WAL | Owain Fôn Williams |
| 38 | FW | WAL | Gareth Taylor (on loan from Nottingham Forest) |
| 39 | DF | ENG | Jon Otsemobor |
| 40 | DF | ALG | Madjid Bougherra (on loan from FC Gueugnon) |

=== Left club during season ===
Note: Flags indicate national team as defined under FIFA eligibility rules; some limited exceptions apply. Players may hold more than one non-FIFA nationality.

| No. / Pos. / Nation / Player; 17 / MF / ENG / Mark Rivers (to Carlisle United) | No. / Pos. / Nation / Player; 33 / GK / ENG / Ross Turnbull (on loan from Middlesbrough) |
