= United Bank International Soccer Festival =

The United Bank International Soccer Festival was a pre-season association football tournament hosted in South Africa during the 1990s. The tournament was sponsored by the South African bank United Bank and organised by the South African Football Association's marketing partner Awesome Sports International.

== 1993 ==
25 July 1993

Manchester United (England)	0–2	(England) Arsenal
	report	Wright 10' (pen.) 26' (pen.)

Ellis Park, Johannesburg
28 July 1993

Orlando Pirates (South Africa)	0–1	(England) Arsenal
		Smith 71'

FNB Stadium, Johannesburg
28 July 1993

Kaizer Chiefs (South Africa)	1–1	(England) Manchester United
Leseyane		Dublin

FNB Stadium, Johannesburg

== 1994 ==
22 May 1994

Liverpool (England)	2–1	(England) Aston Villa
Thomas; Fowler

24 May 1994

Chatsworth Rangers (South Africa)	0–1	(England) Aston Villa
	report	Whittingham 48'

Durban
26 May 1994

Moroka Swallows (South Africa)	v	(England) Aston Villa

Ellis Park, Johannesburg
26 May 1994

Liverpool (England)	3–0	(South Africa) Cape Town Spurs
Charnock; Fowler

Ellis Park, Johannesburg
