= Richard Walker (footballer, born 1980) =

English footballer

Personal information
- Full name: Richard Stuart Walker
- Date of birth: 17 September 1980 (age 46)
- Place of birth: Stafford, England
- Height: 6 ft 0 in (1.83 m)
- Position: Defender

Youth career
- Penkridge Juniors
- ?–1999: Crewe Alexandra

Senior career*
Years	Team	Apps	(Gls)
1999–2006	Crewe Alexandra	101	(6)
1999–2000	→ Northwich Victoria (loan)	10	(0)
2001	→ Halesowen Town (loan)	5	(0)
2006–2008	Port Vale	16	(0)
2007	→ Wrexham (loan)	3	(0)
2008–2009	Macclesfield Town	25	(0)
2009–2010	Hednesford Town	10	(1)
Total		170	(7)
- * Club domestic league appearances and goals

Richard Stuart Walker (born 17 September 1980) is an English football coach and former player who is the head coach for EFL Championship club Wolverhampton Wanderers under-21's.

A defender with an eleven-year professional career, he played 185 competitive games, including 158 appearances in the English Football League. Walker spent most of his career with Crewe Alexandra, and played over 100 games for the club between 1999 and 2006. During this time, he also played on loan for non-League clubs Northwich Victoria and Halesowen Town. He was promoted out of the Second Division with Crewe in 2002–03. He joined Port Vale in 2006 and was loaned out to Wrexham in 2007. In 2008, he signed with Macclesfield Town, before transferring to non-League Hednesford Town the following year. He retired in January 2010.

He coached in the youth academy at Stoke City from 2009 to 2023, after which he joined the academy at Wolverhampton Wanderers.

== Playing career ==
=== Crewe Alexandra ===
Born in Stafford, Staffordshire, Walker attended Wolgarston High School in Penkridge, playing for Penkridge Juniors until signing for Crewe Alexandra at age 14. After working his way through the ranks to the first team, he made over 100 appearances for the "Railwaymen" in seven years, making his debut in November 2000 as a 20-year-old. Before making his professional bow, he had been sent out on loan to local non-League side Northwich Victoria to gain first-team experience, making ten appearances at the Drill Field during a six-month loan during the 1999–2000 season.

In the following season, he made only a handful of appearances for Crewe and was loaned to Southern League side Halesowen Town for a month in March 2001 to play more first-team games.

The 2001–02 season saw Walker make only one substitute appearance for Crewe, though he was still offered a new two-year deal. The following season saw him become a virtual ever-present at Gresty Road as the club won promotion from the Second Division in 2002–03. He agreed a new three-year deal in June 2003, keeping him at Crewe until the summer of 2006. The next two years saw Walker continue to play regular football. Crewe did not offer him a new contract at the end of the 2005–06 season, and instead joined near neighbours Port Vale on a free transfer in June 2006.

=== Port Vale ===
Despite a good start to his time at Vale Park, which included a goal in the League Cup against Championship side Queens Park Rangers, he faded from the first-team picture. He was loaned to struggling League Two side Wrexham in March 2007. His form for the "Dragons" in just three appearances impressed to the extent that Liverpool striker Craig Bellamy added money to the pot collected to pay the defender whilst at the Racecourse Ground. He returned to Vale Park in the summer, but was a peripheral figure during the 2007–08 season, and was released in January 2008 after suffering problems with tendinitis in his knee.

=== Later career ===
After a short spell training with Shrewsbury Town and turning out for their reserves, he joined Macclesfield Town on a short-term deal in March 2008. His form in his ten games impressed manager Keith Alexander sufficiently to win Walker a twelve-month contract in June 2008. He turned out 16 times for the "Silkmen" in 2008–09, playing against Premier League Everton in the FA Cup third round in January 2009. With his contract coming to an end at Moss Rose in May 2009, he made contact with Hednesford Town manager Dean Edwards, who was in the market for an experienced player to become part of the coaching staff at Keys Park after Matt Elliott's departure. Despite his relatively young age and Football League background, he decided to step down to Southern League Premier Division and join the "Pitmen" as the club's new first-team coach. However, he left the club by mutual consent in January 2010.

== Coaching career ==
In July 2009, he was appointed the under-11 coach at Stoke City on a part-time basis. He was made Stoke City U18s manager for the 2018–19 season. He helped the team to reach the semi-finals of the FA Youth Cup in 2017 and the final of the Premier League Cup the following year. Walker left his role at Stoke's Academy in May 2023.

He was then appointed as under-18s lead professional development phase coach at Wolverhampton Wanderers. He took first-team training alongside under-21 head coach Jamie Collins after Vítor Pereira was sacked on 2 November 2025. On 16 September 2026, Walker was appointed Wolves' under-21s head coach after James Collins' departure that summer.

== Career statistics ==
Appearances and goals by club, season and competition
Club	Season	League			FA Cup		League Cup		Other		Total	
Club	Season	Division	Apps	Goals	Apps	Goals	Apps	Goals	Apps	Goals	Apps	Goals
Crewe Alexandra	1999–2000	First Division	0	0	0	0	0	0	—		0	0
Crewe Alexandra	2000–01	First Division	3	0	0	0	0	0	—		3	0
Crewe Alexandra	2001–02	First Division	1	0	0	0	0	0	—		1	0
Crewe Alexandra	2002–03	Second Division	36	2	2	0	2	0	4 (Note: Appearance(s) in the EFL Trophy.)	0	44	2
Crewe Alexandra	2003–04	First Division	20	1	0	0	1	0	—		21	1
Crewe Alexandra	2004–05	Championship	23	2	1	0	2	0	—		26	2
Crewe Alexandra	2005–06	Championship	18	1	1	0	1	1	—		20	2
Crewe Alexandra	Total		101	6	4	0	6	1	4	0	115	7
Northwich Victoria (loan)	1999–2000	Conference National	10	0	0	0	—		0	0	10	0
Halesowen Town (loan)	2000–01	Southern League; Premier Division	5	0	0	0	—		0	0	5	0
Port Vale	2006–07	League One	16	0	1	0	4	1	1	0	22	1
Port Vale	2007–08	League One	0	0	0	0	0	0	0	0	0	0
Port Vale	Total		16	0	1	0	4	1	1	0	22	1
Wrexham (loan)	2006–07	League Two	3	0	—		—		—		3	0
Macclesfield Town	2007–08	League Two	10	0	—		—		—		10	0
Macclesfield Town	2008–09	League Two	15	0	1	0	2	0	0	0	18	0
Macclesfield Town	Total		25	0	1	0	2	0	0	0	28	0
Hednesford Town	2009–10	Southern League; Premier Division	10	1	0	0	—		2 (Note: 1 appearance in the FA Trophy and 1 appearance in the Birmingham Senior Cup.)	0	12	1
Career total			170	7	6	0	12	2	7	0	195	9

== Honours ==
Crewe Alexandra

- Football League Second Division second-place promotion: 2002–03
