= 1997 Football League Second Division play-off final =

Association football match

- The match took place at Wembley Stadium.
Crewe Alexandra	Brentford
1	0
- Date: 25 May 1997
- Venue: Wembley Stadium, London
- Referee: Uriah Rennie (Sheffield)
- Attendance: 34,149

The 1997 Football League Second Division play-off final was an association football match which was played on 25 May 1997 at Wembley Stadium, London, between Crewe Alexandra and Brentford. The top two teams of the 1996–97 Football League Second Division league, Bury and Stockport County, gained automatic promotion to the First Division, while the teams placed from third to sixth place in the table took part in play-offs. The winners of the play-off semi-finals competed for the final place for the 1997–98 season in the First Division. The losing semi-finalists were Luton Town and Bristol City who had been defeated by Crewe and Brentford respectively.

The referee for the match, played in front of 34,149 spectators, was Uriah Rennie from Sheffield. Crewe dominated the early stages of the match and in the 34th minute, Steve Macauley passed Murphy's cross to Shaun Smith who struck from close range to make it 1–0 to Crewe. Within two minutes, McCauley headed a corner from Rivers against the Brentford crossbar. Midway through the second half, Bob Taylor thought he had scored the equaliser for Brentford but his shot was saved by Crewe goalkeeper Jason Kearton. In the 74th minute, Brentford were reduced to ten men after Brian Statham was sent off having been shown a second yellow card. Dele Adebola's shot hit the crossbar of the Brentford goal and two attempts from Colin Little were stopped on the Crewe goal-line by Carl Hutchings. The match ended 1–0 and Crewe were promoted to the First Division.

Brentford's following season saw their manager David Webb resign in August to be replaced by Eddie May. May himself left the club three months later, and was replaced by Micky Adams, who led them to a 21st place in the Second Division and relegation to the Third Division. Crewe ended their next season in eleventh position in the First Division, five places and fifteen points below the play-offs.

== Route to the final ==
Football League Second Division final table, leading positions
Pos	Team	Pld	W	D	L	GF	GA	GD	Pts
1	Bury	46	24	12	10	62	38	+24	84
2	Stockport County	46	23	13	10	59	41	+18	82
3	Luton Town	46	21	15	10	71	45	+26	78
4	Brentford	46	20	14	12	56	43	+13	74
5	Bristol City	46	21	10	15	69	51	+18	73
6	Crewe Alexandra	46	22	7	17	56	47	+9	73

Brentford finished the regular 1996–97 season in fourth place in the Second Division, the third tier of the English football league system, two places ahead of Crewe Alexandra. Both therefore missed out on the two automatic places for promotion to the First Division and instead took part in the play-offs to determine the third promoted team. Brentford finished eight points behind Stockport County (who were promoted in second place) and ten behind league winners Bury. Crewe ended the season one point behind Brentford.

Crewe's opposition for their play-off semi-final were Luton Town with the first match of the two-legged tie taking place at Gresty Road in Crewe on 11 May 1997. The visitors went ahead on three minutes through David Oldfield but Mark Rivers equalised for Crewe eight minutes into the second half. Luton were reduced to ten men in the 58th minute when Julian James was shown his second yellow card; ten minutes later, Colin Little struck for Crewe to secure a 2–1 win. The second leg of the semi-final took place at Kenilworth Road in Luton three days later. Oldfield scored twice in an 11-minute spell: on 20 minutes he levelled the aggregate score after a mistake from Lee Unsworth, then took advantage of a lapse of concentration from Ashley Westwood to double his and Luton's tally. Little scored for Crewe within a minute with a header after a failed clearance from Luton goalkeeper Ian Feuer. Smith then scored midway through the second half to make it 2–2 on the evening, and ensure Crewe's progression to the final with a 4–3 aggregate victory.

Brentford faced Bristol City in the other semi-final; the first leg was held at Ashton Gate in Bristol on 11 May 1997. The away side took the lead in the 13th minute through Paul Smith but Bristol City equalised two minutes later with a header from Gary Owers. Bob Taylor gave Brentford the advantage once again on 30 minutes with a header. Late in the second half, Brentford's Carl Asaba was sent off for a second yellow card and the match ended 2–1. The second leg of the tie took place at Griffin Park three days later. After a goalless first half, Darren Barnard scored for Bristol City in the 49th minute. Taylor scored midway through the half, however, and with eleven minutes remaining, Marcus Bent added a second to make it 2–1 to the visitors, who won the tie 4–2 on aggregate.

== Match ==
=== Background ===
Brentford had appeared in the play-offs on two previous occasions, in 1991 and 1995, but had lost in the semi-finals. They had played in the Second Division since suffering relegation from the First Division in the 1992–93 season. This was Crewe Alexandra's fifth play-off appearance, and their third in a row. It was their second final, having lost to York City in a penalty shootout at Wembley Stadium in the 1993 Football League Third Division play-off final. They had played in the Second Division since gaining promotion in the 1993–94 season and had last played in the second tier of English football 101 years before, in the 1895–96 Football League season, after which they were not re-elected. During the regular 1996–97 season, Crewe won both games between the side, with 2–0 victories at Gresty Road in October 1996 and at Griffin Park the following April.

The Brentford manager David Webb suggested that should his side win the final, the club would consider a flotation on the stock market in order to "organise the club so that if we do go up, it can cope". His counterpart, Dario Gradi, who had managed Crewe for 14 years, was waiting on the fitness of Danny Murphy who had a thigh injury, noting that his side's "plans will revolve around his fitness".

The referee for the match was Uriah Rennie from Sheffield. Brentford adopted a 4–4–2 formation while Crewe played as a 4–3–3. The match was broadcast live in the UK on Sky Sports.

=== Summary ===
The match kicked off around 3 p.m. on 25 May 1997 at Wembley Stadium in front of a crowd of 34,149. Crewe dominated the early stages of the match. In the 32nd minute, Murphy played a one-two with Gareth Whalley but his shot hit the Brentford goalpost. Three minutes later, Steve Macauley passed Murphy's cross to Shaun Smith who struck from close range to make it 1–0 to Crewe. Within two minutes, McCauley headed a corner from Rivers against the Brentford crossbar.

Brentford made their first substitution at half-time when Bent was replaced by Scott Canham. Midway through the second half, Taylor thought he had scored the equaliser for Brentford with a low strike and began to celebrate only to see his shot saved by Crewe goalkeeper Jason Kearton. Dele Adebola's shot hit the crossbar of the Brentford goal in the 73rd minute and a minute later Brentford were reduced to ten men after Brian Statham was sent off having been shown a second yellow card. Two attempts from Little, including one in the last minute of the match, were stopped on the Crewe goal-line by Carl Hutchings.

=== Details ===
25 May 1997
15:00 BST

Crewe Alexandra	1–0	Brentford
Smith 34'	Report

Wembley Stadium, London
Attendance: 34,149
Referee: Uriah Rennie (Sheffield)

Crewe	Brentford

GK	1	Jason Kearton
RB	2	Lee Unsworth
LB	3	Shaun Smith
CB	4	Ashley Westwood
CB	5	Steve Macauley
CM	6	Phil Charnock	(substituted off) 88'
CM	7	Gareth Whalley		Booked
RW	8	Colin Little
CF	9	Dele Adebola
AM	10	Danny Murphy	(substituted off) 86'
LW	11	Mark Rivers	(substituted off) 69'
Substitutes:
DF		Chris Lightfoot	(substituted in) 88'
MF		Steve Garvey	(substituted in) 69'
MF		Seth Johnson	(substituted in) 86'
Manager:
Dario Gradi

GK	1	Kevin Dearden
RB	2	Gus Hurdle	(substituted off) 75'	Booked
LB	3	Ijah Anderson		Booked
CM	4	Carl Hutchings
CB	5	Jamie Bates		Booked
CB	6	David McGhee
CF	7	Carl Asaba
CM	8	Paul Smith
CF	9	Marcus Bent	(substituted off) 46'
CM	10	Brian Statham		(yellow card) (yellow-red card) 73'
CF	11	Robert Taylor
Substitutes:
GK		Tamer Fernandes
DF		Barry Ashby	(substituted in) 75'
MF		Scott Canham	(substituted in) 46'	Booked
Manager:
David Webb

== Post-match ==
Writing in The Times, Brian Glanville described the match as "almost embarrassingly one-sided". Webb conceded that his team could have suffered a heavier defeat: "Our game went backwards and their game went forwards ... They looked much better equipped than us today to go up to be a first division team." Gradi looked to the next season: "We can look forward now to Manchester City and Middlesbrough ... we really haven't dared think about it until now". He accepted that certain players in his squad were likely to be playing for other teams by then, and opined "If they get a chance to go, well, good luck to them". Murphy moved to Liverpool for a deal reportedly worth up to £3 million six weeks later.

Webb resigned before the start of Brentford's following season to become chief executive of the club. He was replaced by Eddie May whose reign lasted until November 1997, when both he and Webb left the club after they had dropped from third in the league to bottom. Micky Adams was appointed as the new manager, and led them to 21st place in the Second Division and relegation to the Third Division, one place from safety. Crewe ended their next season in eleventh position in the First Division, five places and fifteen points below the play-offs.
