= Steve Pope (footballer) =

English footballer

Personal information
- Date of birth: 8 September 1976 (age 50)
- Place of birth: Stoke-on-Trent, England
- Position: Defender

Senior career*
Years	Team	Apps	(Gls)
1997–1999	Crewe Alexandra	6	(0)
1999–2001	Kidderminster Harriers	23	(1)
2001–2004	Bromsgrove Rovers	92	(7)
2004–2005	Halesowen Town	38	(14)
2005–2007	AFC Telford United	16	(4)
2007–2008	Kidsgrove Athletic		
2008–2009	Colwyn Bay		

Managerial career
- 2008: Colwyn Bay
- * Club domestic league appearances and goals

Steve Pope (born 8 September 1976) is an English former footballer who played in the Football League for Crewe Alexandra and for a number of non-league sides. He had short spell as manager of Colwyn Bay from May 2008 to September 2008.
