= Phil Charnock =

English footballer

Personal information
- Full name: Philip Anthony Charnock
- Date of birth: 14 February 1975 (age 51)
- Place of birth: Southport, England
- Height: 5 ft 10 in (1.78 m)
- Position: Midfielder

Youth career
- 1987–1992: Liverpool

Senior career*
Years	Team	Apps	(Gls)
1992–1996	Liverpool	0	(0)
1996	→ Blackpool (loan)	4	(0)
1996–2002	Crewe Alexandra	155	(8)
2002–2003	Port Vale	18	(1)
2003	Bury	3	(0)
2003–2005	Linfield		
2005–2006	Ballymena United	9	(1)
2006–2007	Fleetwood Town		
2007–2008	Leigh RMI	12	(0)
2008	Mossley	5	(1)
Total		206+	(10+)
- * Club domestic league appearances and goals

Philip Anthony Charnock (born 14 February 1975) is an English former footballer who played as a midfielder. Until his record was broken by Trey Nyoni in 2025, he was Liverpool's youngest-ever player to feature in European competition.

He began his career at Liverpool and debuted at 17 years and nine months to become the youngest player to play for the club in European competition. However, he did not play a league game for the "Reds", and after a loan spell to Blackpool in 1996, he signed with Crewe Alexandra in December 1996. He helped the "Railwaymen" to win the Second Division play-offs in 1997. However, injuries hampered his progress at the club. He was released and signed with Port Vale in August 2002. He moved on to Bury in August 2003 before moving on to Linfield the following month. The club won the IFA Premiership in 2003–04 and finished second the following season, and he moved on to Ballymena United in October 2005. He travelled back to England in the summer of 2006 for brief spells with non-League clubs Fleetwood Town, Leigh RMI, and Mossley.

== Playing career ==
=== Liverpool ===
Charnock began his career with Liverpool and made his debut under Graeme Souness on 16 September 1992 in a Cup Winners' Cup game against Apollon Limassol. Charnock was just 17 and 9 months old, making him the youngest player ever to play for the club in European competition, breaking a record previously set by Jamie Redknapp one year earlier. Despite this promising start, Charnock did not break into the first-team at Anfield; instead, he spent much of his time in the reserves and his only other appearance for the Reds was in a League Cup tie against Chesterfield that season. With the advent of squad numbers in the Premier League from the 1993–94 season onwards, Charnock was issued with the number 18 shirt – next worn by Michael Owen, who went on to be one of the club's most highly regarded players ever. He joined Blackpool on loan towards the end of the 1995–96 season, and made four substitute appearances for Sam Allardyce's "Tangerines".

=== Crewe Alexandra ===
In December 1996, he left Liverpool on a free transfer to sign for Crewe Alexandra, following a successful loan spell. He made 36 appearances in 1996–97, scoring his first senior goal on 20 December in a 3–0 win over Notts County at Gresty Road. He also featured in the play-off final, as Alex beat Brentford 1–0 at Wembley to win promotion out of the Second Division; he was replaced by Chris Lightfoot on 65 minutes. He made 35 appearances in 1997–98, as Crewe finished in the top half of the First Division. He played 50 games in 1998–99, as the "Railwaymen" again retained their second-tier status. He played 21 times at the start of the 1999–2000 campaign but did not feature past November. He made nine league appearances towards the end of the 2000–01 season and featured 26 times in 2001–02, but was released in April 2002, after manager Dario Gradi informed him he did not feature in his first-team plans.

=== Later career ===
He moved on to nearby Port Vale in August 2002. He featured 24 times for Brian Horton's "Valiants" in 2002–03, before he was released from Vale Park in May 2003. He joined Bury in August 2003, but played just three Third Division games for Andy Preece's "Shakers" in 2003–04 in a brief stay at Gigg Lane. In September 2003 he moved to Northern Ireland to play for Linfield. His new club won the IFA Premiership title in 2003–04 and finished second in 2004–05. In October 2005 he joined Ballymena United on a short-term contract, which was extended after some good performances. He suffered with injury at both Irish clubs, missing a whole year of action, and he returned to England in summer 2006, joining Fleetwood Town of the Northern Premier League Premier Division. A year later, Charnock signed for Conference North team Leigh RMI. He played just 12 games, as Leigh finished bottom of the league in 2007–08, and were thus relegated. He signed for Mossley in July 2008. He made just five appearances for the Northern Premier League club in 2008–09 before injuries curtailed his career completely.

== Coaching career ==
Charnock returned to Liverpool in 2012 as the coach for the under-12 side and went on to work across the age groups at the academy.

== Career statistics ==
Appearances and goals by club, season and competition
Club	Season	League			FA Cup		Other		Total	
Club	Season	Division	Apps	Goals	Apps	Goals	Apps	Goals	Apps	Goals
Liverpool	1992–93	Premier League	0	0	0	0	2	0	2	0
Blackpool (loan)	1995–96	Second Division	4	0	0	0	0	0	4	0
Crewe Alexandra	1996–97	Second Division	32	1	2	0	6	0	40	1
Crewe Alexandra	1997–98	First Division	33	3	1	0	2	0	36	3
Crewe Alexandra	1998–99	First Division	44	2	1	0	5	0	50	2
Crewe Alexandra	1999–2000	First Division	16	1	0	0	5	0	21	1
Crewe Alexandra	2000–01	First Division	9	0	0	0	1	0	10	0
Crewe Alexandra	2001–02	First Division	23	1	1	0	3	0	27	1
Crewe Alexandra	Total		157	8	5	0	21	0	184	8
Port Vale	2002–03	Second Division	18	1	1	0	3	0	22	1
Bury	2003–04	Third Division	3	0	0	0	0	0	3	0

== Honours ==
Crewe Alexandra

- Football League Second Division play-offs: 1997

Linfield

- IFA Premiership: 2003–04
