= Paul Edwards (footballer, born 1982) =

English footballer

Personal information
- Date of birth: 10 November 1982 (age 44)
- Place of birth: Derby, England
- Position: Forward

Senior career*
Years	Team	Apps	(Gls)
2000–2004	Crewe Alexandra	12	(0)
2002	→ Stafford Rangers (loan)		
2003–2004	→ Southport (loan)	5	(1)
- * Club domestic league appearances and goals

Paul Edwards (born 10 November 1982) is an English former footballer who played in the Football League for Crewe Alexandra.
