= Gareth Whalley =

Footballer (born 1973)

Personal information
- Date of birth: 19 December 1973 (age 52)
- Place of birth: Manchester, England
- Position: Midfielder

Senior career*
Years	Team	Apps	(Gls)
1992–1998	Crewe Alexandra	179	(9)
1998–2002	Bradford City	103	(3)
2002	→ Crewe Alexandra (loan)	7	(0)
2002–2004	Cardiff City	44	(2)
2004–2005	Wigan Athletic	8	(0)
2005–2007	Swindon Town	24	(0)
2007	Altrincham	14	(0)
Total		379	(14)

International career
1999	Republic of Ireland B		
- * Club domestic league appearances and goals

Gareth Whalley (born 19 December 1973) is a former professional footballer who played as a midfielder. Born in England, he represented the Republic of Ireland B team at international level.

== Career ==
Whalley began his football career at Crewe Alexandra, making his club debut in a 4–1 League Cup first round win over Rochdale at Gresty Road on 18 August 1992. He scored his first two Crewe goals in a 6–1 FA Cup second round victory over Accrington Stanley, played at Blackburn's Ewood Park, on 5 December 1992, and was part of the Crewe side beaten by York City after a penalty shoot-out in the 1993 Football League Third Division play-off final at Wembley Stadium on 29 May 1993, his penalty kick being saved by Dean Kiely. Whalley then featured only sporadically during Crewe's promotion-winning 1993–1994 season, before helping the club to Second Division play-off semi-final places in the following two seasons. In 1996–1997, he was part of the team that beat Brentford 1–0 at Wembley in the 1997 Football League Second Division play-off final, and (along with fellow Crewe midfielder Danny Murphy) was named in the Second Division PFA Team of the Year. Despite missing half the season through injury, Whalley then helped Crewe to their highest league finishing position, 11th in the second tier, in 1997–1998. During his time at Crewe, he made 231 first team appearances and scored 17 goals.

In July 1998, Whalley was sold to Division One rivals Bradford City for £600,000. He made his Bradford debut against Stockport County on 8 August 1998, and scored his first goal for the club in a 4–2 league win at Portsmouth on 20 October 1998, making 52 appearances across all competitions during Bradford's promotion-winning 1998-1999 season. He played just 18 Premier League games the following season, but was part of the Bradford side that competed in Europe in the UEFA Intertoto Cup at the start of the 2000–2001 season, during which he also played 19 Premiership matches and three League Cup ties, scoring in two of the latter. After Bradford were relegated back to Division One, Whalley played a further 25 games for the club before finishing the season with a seven-match loan spell at former club Crewe.

In July 2002, Whalley joined League Two side Cardiff City, making his debut at Oldham Athletic on 10 August 2002, and playing a further 22 times in a season interrupted by injury. After Cardiff won promotion to League One, he made a further 24 appearances, scoring twice for the Welsh side.

Whalley was then involved in a contractual dispute over a £50,000 appearance bonus, and had his contract cancelled by the club, signing for EFL Championship side Wigan Athletic in September 2004. He made nine appearances for Wigan before a July 2005 move to EFL League One Swindon Town, where he played for one season, making 27 appearances, then played half a season at Altrincham.

At international level, Whalley was included in a number of Republic of Ireland senior squads under Mick McCarthy but never won a full cap. He was capped at "B" international level.

He was appointed as an assistant coach for Manchester City under-18 team in July 2014.

== Honours ==
Crewe Alexandra

- Football League Second Division play-offs: 1997

Cardiff City

- Football League Second Division play-offs: 2003

Individual

- PFA Team of the Year: 1996–97 Second Division
