= James Robinson (footballer, born 1982) =

English footballer (born 1982)

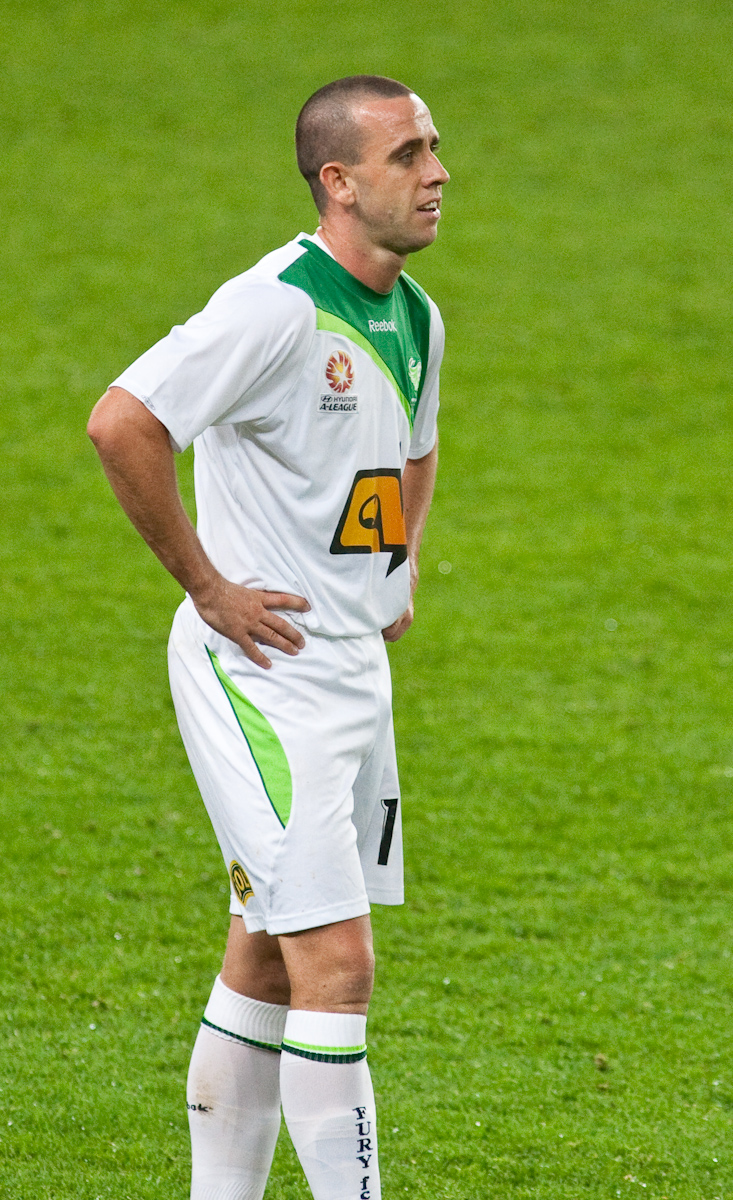
- Robinson playing for North Queensland Fury in 2009

Personal information
- Full name: James Gilbert Robinson
- Date of birth: 18 September 1982 (age 44)
- Place of birth: Liverpool, England
- Position: Midfielder

Team information
- Current team: Brisbane Roar FC Youth (Manager)

Youth career
- Crewe Alexandra

Senior career*
Years	Team	Apps	(Gls)
2003–2005	Crewe Alexandra	15	(1)
2005	ÍBV	1	(0)
2005	Accrington Stanley	0	(0)
2005–2006	Altrincham	14	(4)
2006	Richmond SC	19	(13)
2006–2007	Melbourne Victory	7	(1)
2007	Marconi Stallions	10	(5)
2007–2009	Perth Glory	21	(2)
2009–2010	North Queensland Fury	13	(0)
2011	Oakleigh Cannons	23	(4)
2012–2013	FC Bulleen Lions	10	(4)
2013	Sriwijaya	1	(0)
2013	Dandenong Thunder	0	(0)
2014	Ballarat Red Devils	0	(0)

Managerial career
- 2014–2015: Ballarat Red Devils
- 2016–2018: Brisbane Roar FC Youth
- 2019–: Ballarat City
- * Club domestic league appearances and goals

James Robinson (born 18 September 1982) is an English football manager and former player who last managed National Premier Leagues Victoria side Ballarat Red Devils from 2014 to 2015 before joining A-League club Brisbane Roar to manage their youth team in 2016.

== Playing career ==
=== England and Iceland ===
Born in Liverpool, Robinson joined English team Crewe Alexandra in 1990 at the age of eight, and made his first team debut with the club in 2002, making 15 first team appearances, scoring once against Ipswich Town. He left Crewe Alexandra by mutual consent in 2005 with a year remaining on his contract. Robinson signed for Icelandic club ÍBV ahead of the 2005 season along with fellow former Crewe player Matthew Platt. Upon his return to England later that year, he signed for Football Conference side Accrington Stanley but failed to make a first-team appearance for the club. In November 2005 he joined Altrincham, where he scored four goals in 14 Conference matches.

=== Australia ===
In February 2006, Robinson headed to Australia, where he joined Melbourne-based Richmond SC. At that time, it was discovered that neither Accrington nor Altrincham had obtained international clearance for Robinson to transfer or play for them, a procedure required due to his spell in Iceland. Accrington escaped penalty, as Robinson had not appeared for their first team. Altrincham, however, had 18 points deducted (all points earned during Robinson's matches), nearly dooming them to relegation. Robinson was devastated by the sanctions to his former team, but went on to help Richmond SC, then in Victorian State League Division 1, earn promotion to the Victorian Premier League.

=== Melbourne Victory ===
It was a string of impressive performances for the third, then second-tier club – 19 games for 13 goals in 2006 – that saw Robinson initially selected as a train-on squad player for A-League club Melbourne Victory. By Round 8, and with Melbourne's prolific striker Archie Thompson away on national duty for Australia, Robinson was called up to a bench spot for the away match at Newcastle, upon which he came on as an 81st-minute substitute.

With the departure of Belgian defender Geoffrey Claeys in November 2006, Melbourne Victory announced the signing of the striker; at the end of the home and away season, Robinson had played a total of five games. His only start came in the Round 19 match against Perth Glory at Members Equity Stadium. His first and only goal for the club came in the 92nd minute with a looping header against Adelaide United in the 2007 A-League major semi-final second leg in front of 47,000 fans to win the game for Melbourne Victory and send them through to their first A-League grand final.

Despite his contribution to the Victory's campaign, he was not offered a new contract by coach Ernie Merrick - he said that the loss of Robinson from the team was due to his Australian visa conditions.

=== Perth Glory ===
Robinson was signed by A-League club Perth Glory for the 2007–08 season after his performances for Sydney team Marconi Stallions and after impressing on a pre season trial.

=== North Queensland Fury ===
Robinson was a founder member of the North Queensland Fury team and made several appearances for the team.

=== Late career ===
Towards the end of his playing career, Robinson had a spell at Victorian Premier League side Oakleigh Cannons in 2011, then a two-year stay at Bulleen Lions, a brief journey to Indonesia Super League side Sriwijaya FC and then Dandenong Thunder back in Victoria.

== Coaching career ==
=== Ballarat Red Devils ===
On 13 January 2014, Ballarat Red Devils announced the signing of Robinson as player-coach ahead of their inaugural NPLV season. Unfortunately, Ballarat were relegated from the Victorian top flight on the final matchday. In the 2015 season, Ballarat finished fourth and the Englishman was voted NPL 1 Coach of the Year by his peers. Robinson resigned from his position at Ballarat in November 2015.

=== Brisbane Roar Youth ===
On 7 September 2016 it was announced that Robinson was taking charge of Brisbane Roar FC's youth side for the National Youth League and National Premier Leagues Queensland competitions.
