= Mark Rivers =

English footballer

Personal information
- Date of birth: 26 November 1975 (age 50)
- Place of birth: Crewe, England
- Positions: Winger; striker

Youth career
- 1983–1993: Crewe Alexandra

Senior career*
Years	Team	Apps	(Gls)
1994–2001	Crewe Alexandra	202	(42)
1994	→ Sarpsborg (loan)		
2001–2004	Norwich City	74	(10)
2004–2006	Crewe Alexandra	51	(10)
2006	Carlisle United	4	(0)
Total		331	(62)
- * Club domestic league appearances and goals as of 16:54, 17 May 2021 (UTC)

Mark Rivers (born 26 November 1975) is an English former professional footballer who played as a forward from 1994 until 2006 notably for Crewe Alexandra and Norwich City.

== Career ==
=== Crewe Alexandra ===
Mark Rivers was a product of the Crewe Alexandra F.C. Academy, signing his first professional contract in May 1994. At the same time, he was loaned out to Norwegian 2. divisjon club Sarpsborg FK, and made his debut in the cup against Vålerenga. He was diagnosed with mononucleosis and left Sarpsborg in late June.

Rivers made his Crewe debut on 4 October 1995 coming on as a substitute in an EFL League Cup second round tie against Sheffield Wednesday at Hillsborough. He scored his first Crewe goal, again after coming on as a substitute, in Crewe's 8–0 win over Hartlepool United at Gresty Road. On his first league start, he scored twice in Crewe's 3–1 win over Brentford. During the 1995–1996 season, he scored 14 goals in all competitions for his home town club. The following season he helped Crewe to a Second Division play-off final victory over Brentford that saw the club promoted to the second tier for the first time in its history. In the First Division, Rivers scored eight goals in 37 appearances for the Railwaymen during the 1997-98 season, and then scored ten goals in 48 appearances the following season. During the 1999–2000 season, he netted nine times in 36 appearances, followed by ten goals in 38 appearances in 2000–01. To this point, 25-year-old Rivers had scored 58 goals in 239 games for Crewe.

=== Norwich City ===
In June 2001, Crewe and Norwich agreed a deal with an initial fee of around £500,000 for his transfer with Rivers signing a four year contract. Rivers made 37 appearances during Norwich's 2001–02 campaign as Norwich reached the play off final that season which was held at the Millennium Stadium in Cardiff. Rivers had scored in the first leg of their play off semi-final against Wolves in a 3-1 win at Carrow Road. After the disappointment of losing the play off final to Birmingham City on penalties, the 2002-03 season saw Rivers finish the campaign with 32 appearances and four goals. Rivers won the Football League First Division title with Norwich in the 2003-04 season, sealing promotion to the Premier League. At the end of the season it was announced that Rivers had left the club by mutual consent. Norwich manager Nigel Worthington said that Rivers had been frustrated by a lack of first team opportunities and needed a move to get first team football.

=== Return to Crewe ===
After leaving Norwich, Rivers initially trained with their local rivals Ipswich Town, however a move didn't materialise and in the end he signed a two-year deal with his former club Crewe. Over the next one and a half seasons, he made 56 appearances for the Cheshire side, scoring 11 times.

=== Carlisle United ===
On 23 January 2006, Rivers signed for Carlisle United until the end of their 2005–06 season, making six appearances. He left by mutual consent on 28 April 2006.

== Life after football ==
It was reported in 2012 that Rivers was setting up a chaffeur business.

== Honours ==
Crewe Alexandra

- Football League Second Division play-offs: 1997

Norwich City

- Football League First Division: 2003–04
