= Jason Kearton =

Australian soccer player (born 1969)

Personal information
- Full name: Jason Brett Kearton
- Date of birth: 9 July 1969 (age 57)
- Place of birth: Ipswich, Queensland, Australia
- Height: 5 ft 11 in (1.80 m)
- Position: Goalkeeper

Senior career*
Years	Team	Apps	(Gls)
1987–1988	Brisbane Roar	26	(0)
1988–1996	Everton	6	(0)
1991	→ Stoke City (loan)	16	(0)
1992	→ Blackpool (loan)	14	(0)
1995	→ Notts County (loan)	10	(0)
1996	→ Preston North End (loan)	0	(0)
1996–2001	Crewe Alexandra	191	(0)
2001–2004	Brisbane Strikers	55	(0)
2004	Queensland Lions		
2014	Brisbane Roar	0	(0)
Total		318	(0)
- * Club domestic league appearances and goals

Jason Brett Kearton (born 9 July 1969) is an Australian soccer coach and former professional player.

He was a goalkeeper from 1987 until 2004. After starting his career with Brisbane Roar, he moved to England to play in the Premier League for Everton. He also played in England with Stoke City, Blackpool, Notts County, Preston North End and Crewe Alexandra. He finished his career with Brisbane Strikers and now owns his own goalkeeping coaching school.

== Playing career ==
Kearton was born in Ipswich, Queensland, and began his career in his native land, firstly with Coalstars and then with the Brisbane Lions. In 1988, at the age of 19, he made the biggest move of his career when then-Everton manager Colin Harvey signed him as cover for first-choice Neville Southall. He was never able to dislodge Southall from the number one spot at Goodison Park making eight appearances for the club in eight years. He spent time out on loan at Stoke City in 1991–92 where Kearton kept six clean sheets in sixteen appearances for the Potters. He also spent time on loan at Blackpool (14 appearances) and Notts County (12 appearances).

In 1995, Kearton signed for Dario Gradi's Crewe Alexandra, where he spent four years and made close to 200 league appearances helping the side gain promotion in 1996–97 by beating Brentford in the play-off final. In August 2001, he returned to his homeland and went on to play for Brisbane Strikers and Queensland Lions.

In 2014, Kearton was an unused substitute for the Roar in an FFA Cup match against Adelaide United.

== Coaching career ==
Kearton is the owner, founder and head coach of Jason Kearton Goalkeeping, an Australian-based goalkeeping soccer academy. He was appointed goalkeeping coach of A-League club Brisbane Roar in 2012.

== Personal life ==
He has two UK-born children.

== Career statistics ==
Appearances and goals by club, season and competition
Club	Season	League			FA Cup		League Cup		Other (Note: Includes Anglo-Italian Cup, Football League Trophy and Football League play-offs.)		Total	
Club	Season	Division	Apps	Goals	Apps	Goals	Apps	Goals	Apps	Goals	Apps	Goals
Everton	1991–92	First Division	0	0	0	0	0	0	0	0	0	0
Everton	1992–93	Premier League	5	0	1	0	0	0	0	0	6	0
Everton	1993–94	Premier League	0	0	0	0	1	0	0	0	1	0
Everton	1994–95	Premier League	1	0	0	0	0	0	0	0	1	0
Everton	1995–96	Premier League	0	0	0	0	0	0	0	0	0	0
Everton	Total		6	0	1	0	1	0	0	0	8	0
Stoke City (loan)	1991–92	Third Division	16	0	0	0	0	0	1	0	17	0
Blackpool (loan)	1991–92	Fourth Division	14	0	0	0	0	0	0	0	14	0
Notts County (loan)	1994–95	First Division	10	0	0	0	0	0	2	0	12	0
Crewe Alexandra	1996–97	Second Division	30	0	4	0	0	0	6	0	40	0
Crewe Alexandra	1997–98	First Division	43	0	1	0	1	0	0	0	45	0
Crewe Alexandra	1998–99	First Division	46	0	1	0	5	0	0	0	52	0
Crewe Alexandra	1999–2000	First Division	46	0	1	0	5	0	0	0	52	0
Crewe Alexandra	2000–01	First Division	26	0	0	0	4	0	0	0	30	0
Crewe Alexandra	Total		191	0	7	0	15	0	6	0	219	0
Career total			237	0	8	0	16	0	9	0	270	0

== Honours ==
Everton

- FA Cup: 1994–95
- FA Charity Shield: 1995

Crewe Alexandra

- Football League Second Division play-offs: 1997
