= Steve Macauley =

English footballer

Personal information
- Full name: Stephen Roy Macauley
- Date of birth: 4 March 1969 (age 57)
- Place of birth: Lytham St Annes, England
- Height: 6 ft 1 in (1.85 m)
- Position: Defender

Youth career
- 1987-1992: Manchester City

Senior career*
Years	Team	Apps	(Gls)
1992	Fleetwood Town	0	(0)
1992–2002	Crewe Alexandra	261	(26)
2001–2002	→ Macclesfield Town (loan)	12	(0)
2002–2003	Rochdale	6	(0)
2002	→ Macclesfield Town (loan)	3	(1)
2003	→ Macclesfield Town (loan)	11	(0)
2003–2004	Macclesfield Town	22	(0)
2004–2005	Bamber Bridge		
- * Club domestic league appearances and goals

Stephen Roy Macauley (born 4 March 1969 in Lytham St Annes, Lancashire) is an English former professional footballer, who played primarily as a central defender. He began his career at Manchester City as a trainee. After a brief spell at local Fylde coast side Fleetwood Town, he joined Crewe Alexandra in March 1992 for a fee of £25,000. He went on to spend ten years at the South Cheshire club under manager Dario Gradi.

He was the first team coach at Fleetwood Town.

== Career ==
=== Crewe Alexandra (1992–2002) ===
Macauley joined Crewe in March 1992, making his debut in a 1–0 win against Blackpool at Gresty Road on 28 March 1992. He scored his first Crewe goal in a 1–1 draw at Cardiff City on 28 April 1992.

According to the football website Soccerbase, Macauley played 260 league games for Crewe, plus 16 in the Football League Cup and 20 in the FA Cup, plus 22 other assorted appearances, scoring 30 goals. He is credited with having played an important role in the club's promotion to the First Division of the Nationwide League in 1997, and subsequent successful battles to stay in the division. His partners in defence included Ashley Westwood, later of Sheffield Wednesday, and Dave Walton, later of Derby County. He also played alongside future Premiership players such as Danny Murphy, Neil Lennon, Rob Hulse and Dean Ashton. Although a centre half, he did play a number of games as a forward during a striking injury crisis at the Alex during the mid-90s.

During his spell at Crewe, the club reached the 1992–93 play-off final against York City, only to lose on penalties, before being promoted the following season. They then rose into what is now the Football League Championship following victory at Wembley against Brentford on 25 May 1997.

=== Rochdale and Macclesfield (2002–2004) ===
In the summer of 2002 after an injury-hit final season during which he was loaned to neighbours Macclesfield Town, Macauley joined Rochdale but only made six league appearances. During this time he was two further loan spells at Macclesfield before joining them on a permanent basis.

=== Joint testimonials (2003) ===
He eventually retired from League football at the end of the 2003–04 season having had a joint testimonial with fellow former Alex defender Shaun Smith at Crewe's Alexandra Stadium in 2003 (the game was held over from the previous year). The two players' careers had become linked through their many seasons together in Crewe's defence after both joining during early 1992.

=== Bamber Bridge (2004–2005) ===
After leaving Macclesfield in 2003–04, he went on to play for semi-professional Lancashire club Bamber Bridge in the Northern Premier League. His debut came in a 1–0 away victory over Blyth Spartans and his final game for Bamber was the return fixture against the same opposition, Macauley scoring the consolation goal as his team lost 3–1.

=== After retirement ===
Macauley qualified as a physiotherapist during his playing career, graduating from the University of Salford in 1999 with a degree in Physiotherapy. He joined Fleetwood as physio and member of the coaching staff in 2005. He left the club at the end of the 2007–08 season to concentrate on his physiotherapy practice, but was re-engaged by Fleetwood as caretaker manager in September 2008, following the dismissal of manager Tony Greenwood after a poor start to Fleetwood's inaugural Conference North campaign. He returned to the coaching staff following the appointment of Micky Mellon as Fleetwood manager.

== Honours ==
Crewe Alexandra

- Football League Second Division play-offs: 1997
