= Shaun Smith (English footballer) =

English professional footballer (born 1971)

Personal information
- Full name: Gareth Shaun Smith
- Date of birth: 9 April 1971 (age 55)
- Place of birth: Leeds, England
- Position: Defender

Senior career*
Years	Team	Apps	(Gls)
1989–1991	Halifax Town	7	(0)
1991	Emley		
1991–2002	Crewe Alexandra	400	(40)
2002–2004	Hull City	22	(1)
2003	→ Stockport County (loan)	6	(0)
2003	→ Carlisle United (loan)	3	(0)
2004	Rochdale	13	(0)
2004–2006	York City	19	(0)
Total		470	(40)
- * Club domestic league appearances and goals

Gareth Shaun Smith (born 9 April 1971) is an English former professional footballer. Smith spent the majority of his career at Crewe Alexandra, playing in 400 League games and more than 460 overall.

The highlight of Smith's career came when he scored the winner for Crewe Alexandra in their 1-0 victory over Brentford in the 1997 1997 Football League Second Division play-off final at Wembley. This took Crewe into the second tier of English football for the first time in around a century. He had also played in the 1993 Third division final at Wembley, which Crewe lost on penalties to York City. During the first division era Smith played mostly at left back for Crewe and was popular with the supporters despite never being a big star. He won the supporter's player of the year award in 2000–01. Smith eventually left Crewe in the summer of 2002 to join Hull City, where he scored once against Cambridge United, and a year later had two joint testimonial games (alongside fellow player Steve Macauley) at Crewe's Alexandra Stadium against Merseyside clubs Liverpool and Everton.

== Honours ==
Crewe Alexandra

- Football League Second Division play-offs: 1997
