= Stephen Foster (footballer) =

English footballer

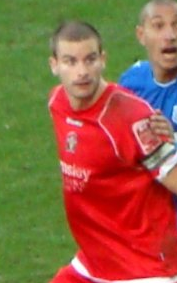
- Foster playing for Barnsley

Personal information
- Full name: Stephen John Foster
- Date of birth: 18 September 1980 (age 46)
- Place of birth: Warrington, England
- Height: 6 ft 2 in (1.88 m)
- Position: Defender

Youth career
- ?–1998: Crewe Alexandra

Senior career*
Years	Team	Apps	(Gls)
1998–2006	Crewe Alexandra	217	(15)
2006–2007	Burnley	17	(0)
2007–2013	Barnsley	226	(10)
2013–2014	Tranmere Rovers	4	(0)
Total		464	(25)
- * Club domestic league appearances and goals

Stephen John Foster (born 18 September 1980) is an English retired footballer.

== Career ==
Born in Warrington, Cheshire, Foster signed for local club Crewe Alexandra as a trainee in August 1997 and made his debut just over a year later in Crewe's 1–0 loss at Bury on 22 August 1998. He made his second appearance the following month in Crewe's 1–1 draw at Bristol City on 16 September 1998. Foster played no first team games for Crewe during the 1999–2000 season, but started the following season by scoring his first goal for Crewe, in the 84th minute of a 2–2 draw with Bury on 22 August 2000 (Mark Rivers scored Crewe's second goal two minutes later). It took four seasons before Foster received his first red card – in Crewe's 2–1 loss at Gresty Road against Oldham Athletic on 29 December 2002. He ultimately played 242 first team games for Crewe, scoring 18 goals.

After Crewe's relegation from the Championship in the 2005–06 season, Foster, who was out of contract, turned down a new offer by Crewe in favour of joining Championship side Burnley on a free transfer in June 2006. His time at Burnley were spent mainly as a squad player or substitute, making just 20 first team appearances in 14 months.

In August 2007 Foster was transferred to Barnsley for £100,000, signing a two-year contract, after they tracked him throughout the summer.

Foster made a positive start to his Barnsley career, enjoying a regular run in the team at right-back, though he was sent off after two bookable offences during the 3–3 draw with Stoke City at Oakwell on Boxing Day 2007. On 5 January 2008, Foster scored his first Barnsley goal in an FA Cup third round tie against Blackpool, back-heeling the ball after a corner. He then scored a headed goal from Martin Devaney's cross against Liverpool at Anfield in a 5th round match on 16 February 2008 that Barnsley won 2–1. He bagged his first league goal for Barnsley at Watford in a 3–0 win on 9 April 2008, heading home Diego León's corner. Foster was voted by fans as Barnsley's player of the season for 2007–2008, ahead of club captain Brian Howard and winger Jamal Campbell-Ryce, second and third respectively.

Foster was appointed Barnsley club captain until the start of the 2010/11 season when the captaincy was passed to new signing Jason Shackell. In six season at Oakwell, he played 244 games for Barnsley, scoring 18 goals.

Foster then joined Tranmere in June 2013 on a two-year deal, but played just four games for Rovers before the 33-year-old's contract was terminated by mutual consent in February 2014.

== Career statistics ==
As of 19 August 2021.

Club	Season	League^{[A]}		FA Cup		League Cup		Other^{[B]}		Total	
Club	Season	Apps	Goals	Apps	Goals	Apps	Goals	Apps	Goals	Apps	Goals
Crewe Alexandra	1998–99	1	0	0	0	1	0	0	0	2	0
Crewe Alexandra	1999–00	0	0	0	0	0	0	0	0	0	0
Crewe Alexandra	2000–01	29	0	3	0	2	1	0	0	34	1
Crewe Alexandra	2001–02	34	5	3	1	1	0	0	0	38	6
Crewe Alexandra	2002–03	35	4	3	0	1	0	4	0	43	4
Crewe Alexandra	2003–04	45	2	1	0	2	0	0	0	48	2
Crewe Alexandra	2004–05	34	1	1	0	3	1	0	0	38	2
Crewe Alexandra	2005–06	39	3	0	0	0	0	0	0	39	3
Crewe Alexandra	Total	217	15	11	1	10	2	4	0	242	18
Burnley	2006–07	17	0	1	0	1	0	0	0	19	0
Burnley	2007–08	0	0	0	0	1	0	0	0	1	0
Burnley	Total	17	0	1	0	2	0	0	0	20	0
Barnsley	2007–08	41	1	5	2	0	0	0	0	46	3
Barnsley	2008–09	38	3	1	0	1	0	0	0	40	3
Barnsley	2009–10	42	2	1	0	4	0	0	0	47	2
Barnsley	2010–11	33	1	1	0	1	0	0	0	35	1
Barnsley	2011–12	41	1	1	0	0	0	0	0	42	1
Barnsley	2012–13	31	2	1	0	1	0	0	0	34	2
Barnsley	Total	226	10	10	2	7	0	0	0	244	12
Tranmere Rovers	2013–14	4	0	0	0	1	0	0	0	5	0
Tranmere Rovers	Total	4	0	0	0	1	0	0	0	5	0
Career totals		464	25	22	3	20	2	4	0	511	30

A. The "League" column constitutes appearances and goals (including those as a substitute) in the Football League.
B. The "Other" column constitutes appearances and goals (including those as a substitute) in the Football League Trophy.

== Honours ==
Individual

- Barnsley Player of the Year: 2007–08
