= Colin Little =

English footballer (born 1972)

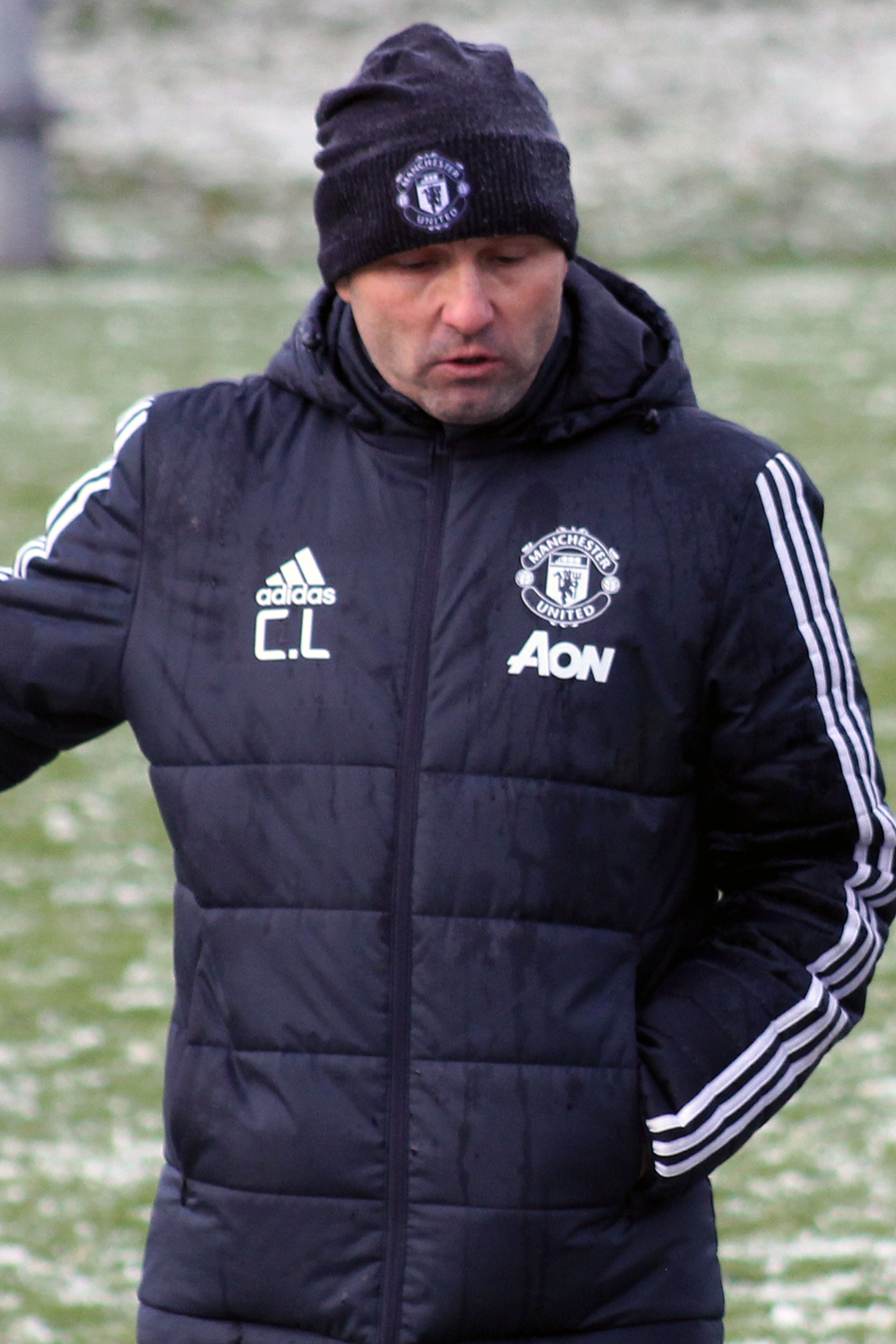
- Little coaching Manchester United U18s in December 2017

Personal information
- Full name: Colin Campbell Little
- Date of birth: 4 November 1972 (age 53)
- Place of birth: Wythenshawe, England
- Height: 5 ft 10 in (1.78 m)
- Position: Striker

Team information
- Current team: Manchester United (U18 Coach)

Senior career*
Years	Team	Apps	(Gls)
1994–1996	Hyde United	95	(56)
1996–2003	Crewe Alexandra	228	(45)
2002	→ Mansfield Town (loan)	5	(0)
2002	→ Macclesfield Town (loan)	1	(0)
2002–2003	→ Macclesfield Town (loan)	5	(1)
2003–2004	Macclesfield Town	24	(5)
2004	Halifax Town	8	(2)
2004–2010	Altrincham	228	(114)
2010	FC United of Manchester	3	(2)
2010	Altrincham	0	(0)
2010	New Mills	1	(0)
2010–	Witton Albion	0	(0)
- * Club domestic league appearances and goals as of 5 September 2010

Colin Campbell Little (born 4 November 1972) is an English former professional footballer who played as a striker.

After starting in non-league football with Rossendale United and Hyde United, Little joined Crewe Alexandra in 1996. He had loan spells with Mansfield Town and Macclesfield Town, and later made his stay in Macclesfield permanent. Little made eight appearances for Halifax Town before joining Altrincham in 2004 – where he went on to make over 200 appearances for the club. He later played for F.C. United of Manchester, Altrincham, New Mills and Witton Albion.

Little worked as an Under-15s coach during his time at Crewe Alexandra, and joined Manchester United as an Under-13s coach in 2009. He now works for the club as an Under-18s coach.

== Career ==
Born in Wythenshawe, Manchester, Little began his career in Non-League football with Rossendale United before signing for Hyde United.

After being spotted by Crewe Alexandra manager Dario Gradi he signed for them for £50,000 in the summer of 1996. After initial success at Crewe he became a journeyman around the Football League, playing for Macclesfield Town and Halifax Town before being released in 2004.

Shortly after this Little signed for Altrincham. He was the club top scorer at Altrincham for the next four seasons. He scored his 100th goal for the club in the 1–0 victory away to Newcastle Blue Star in the FA Cup fourth qualifying round on 26 October 2008.

On 7 April 2010, it was announced that Little would leave Altrincham at the end of the 2009–10 season, to become assistant coach for Manchester United under-13s.

He joined FC United of Manchester as a player in the summer of 2010 and was named in the 21 player squad for the 2010–11 season by the club. He then scored 2 goals in his league debut on 8 August 2010 for the club after coming on as a substitute in a 5–1 victory over Retford United. However, on 10 September 2010 it was announced he had left the club to re-sign for Altrincham on a pay-as-you-play, home game-only deal, whilst still coaching at Manchester United. He did not make another appearance for Altrincham before he signed for New Mills in early October 2010. He made his first, and only appearance for the club on 9 October against Maine Road, before then signing for Witton Albion on 26 October 2010.

Little retired from playing at non-League level in 2012 although can still be found turning out for Sunday League sides in the Wythenshawe area.

== Honours ==
Crewe Alexandra

- Football League Second Division play-offs: 1997
