= Dave Walton =

English footballer

Personal information
- Full name: David Walton
- Date of birth: 10 April 1973 (age 53)
- Place of birth: Bedlington, England
- Height: 1.88 m (6 ft 2 in)
- Position: Defender

Youth career
- 1990–1991: Ashington

Senior career*
| Years | Team | Apps | (Gls) |
| 1991–1993 | Sheffield United | 0 | (0) |
| 1993–1997 | Shrewsbury Town | 128 | (10) |
| 1997–2003 | Crewe Alexandra | 155 | (3) |
| 2003–2004 | Derby County | 5 | (0) |
| 2004 | → Stockport County (loan) | 7 | (0) |
| 2004–2005 | Shrewsbury Town | 38 | (4) |
| Total | | 333 | (17) |
- * Club domestic league appearances and goals

David Walton (born 10 April 1973) is an English retired footballer who played as a centre-back. He spent most of his career at Shrewsbury Town and Crewe Alexandra, making over 250 league appearances between the two clubs.

== Club career ==
Born in Bedlington in Northumbria, Walton began his footballing career with his local club Ashington. After a year, he was offered his first professional contract by Sheffield United at the age of eighteen. He failed to break into the first team at Bramall Lane, and after two years in the team youth and reserve sides, he was transferred to Shrewsbury Town on his first of two spells at the club. He spent three years at Gay Meadow, making over 100 appearances, scoring twelve goals in all competitions and achieving a Third Division title win with the club during his first year.

In October 1997, Walton was signed by Crewe Alexandra for £500,000, making him the most expensive player in the Railwaymen's history (this record was broken a year later when Rodney Jack was signed for £650,000 from Torquay United). According to Shrewsbury Town chairman Roland Wycherley in 2012, this sale kept his club from extinction. Walton made his Crewe debut in a 1–0 defeat away at Bradford City on 25 October 1997, and went on to make 27 further appearances that season. He scored his first Crewe goal, the equaliser in a 1–1 draw at Crystal Palace, on 13 February 1999. In total, the defender spent six seasons at the club, all but one in the second tier Football League First Division, making it the longest time he had spent at a club in his career. He made 155 league and 16 cup appearances for the South Cheshire club, despite a number of injuries. In his last season at the club, Walton helped Crewe to the runners-up spot and promotion from Division Two after making 28 league appearances.

In June 2003, Walton's contract at Crew expired and he joined Derby County on a two-year deal. However, an injury during pre–season left Walton out until October where he made his début in a 2–1 defeat at Norwich City. Walton failed to establish himself in George Burley's first team and in February he was loaned for a month to Stockport County in the Football League Second Division, where he made seven league appearances. In July 2004, he was left out of Derby's tour of Norway and went on trial at Burnley, under Steve Cotterill.

After a year at Pride Park, the defender had his contract cancelled by mutual consent. He was soon picked up by his old club Shrewsbury on a two-year deal, with the team having returned to the Football League after one year in the Conference Premier. He added a further 38 league appearances and helped his side survive relegation from the Football League. At the start of the 2005–06 season, he was given the role of club captain. Due to recurring knee problems, he left the club in December 2005, aged 32, and conceded that he could only play football part-time.

== Honours ==
Shrewsbury Town

- Football League Third Division: 1993–94
- Football League Trophy runner-up: 1995–96

Crewe Alexandra

- Football League Second Division second-place promotion: 2002–03
