= John Bowler (businessman) =

British football executive (1937–2022)

John Bowler MBE
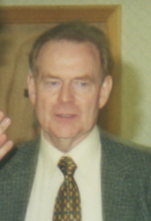
- Bowler in 2000
- Born: 14 February 1937
- Died: 16 February 2022 (aged 85)
- Other names: Edward John Bowler
- Occupation(s): Chairman, Crewe Alexandra Football Club (1988–2021)

John Bowler, MBE (14 February 1937 – 16 February 2022) was an English businessman and the chairman of Crewe Alexandra Football Club. Elected chairman in 1988, he resigned in March 2021 following criticisms of him and the club in the Football Association's inquiry into sex abuse in English football.

== Biography ==
Having joined the board in 1980, Bowler became chairman at Crewe Alexandra in 1988, (Note: Different sources give varying dates (some suggest 1987 - the BBC quotes Bowler's own uncertainty: "something like 1987 or 1988 ... It was such a long time ago"), however records at Companies House show Rowlinson was chairman in May 1988; Bowler had become chairman by the time the following years accounts were signed in May 1989.) succeeding Norman Rowlinson. Prior to joining Crewe, he was a marketing director at pharmaceutical company Wellcome.

What he brings is not the braggadocio of the self-made wheeler-dealers but the calm experience of somebody who has actually been involved in running a large, successful organisation.

— David Conn, The Beautiful Game

His time at Crewe coincided with the appointment and long tenure of manager Dario Gradi, the most successful period in its history. Under his chairmanship, the club won promotion six times (twice at Wembley). The club reached the second tier, Division One, in 1997, after victory over Brentford in the Division Two play-off final, and finished in 11th position, their highest finishing position, in the 1997–98 First Division season. Crewe also won the Football League Trophy in 2013. It also became renowned for its youth development strategy, generating more than £32 million of income through player sales.

In March 2014, Bowler was honoured with the Contribution to League Football Award at The Football League Awards 2014. In December 2014, it was announced that Bowler had been appointed an MBE in the 2015 New Year Honours for services to football.

Bowler was chairman in late 2016 when Crewe became embroiled in the United Kingdom football sexual abuse scandal. In 2019, he said Crewe had not appreciated the dangers of football being used as a means for a paedophile to prey on young boys. The FA's 700-page report into the scandal was published on 17 March 2021, identifying failures to act adequately on complaints or rumours of sexual abuse at eight professional clubs including Crewe. Considering whether senior club people knew about Bennell, Sheldon concluded they had not received specific reports of abuse (a conclusion also reached by Cheshire constabulary). However, Norman Rowlinson, John Bowler and Hamilton Smith had discussed concerns about inappropriate behaviour; the club "should have done more to check on the well-being of the boys", Sheldon said. Following publication of the report, there were calls for Bowler to resign, including from the club's own supporters group; Bowler announced his resignation as a director and chairman of the club on 25 March 2021.

He died on 16 February 2022, two days after his 85th birthday.
