= Sexual abuse cases at Crewe Alexandra F.C. =

Cases of sexual abuse by a football coach

The sexual abuse scandal at Crewe Alexandra F.C. concerned child sexual abuse by former football coach Barry Bennell while employed at English professional football club Crewe Alexandra in the 1980s. While Bennell had been convicted for sex offences in the US in 1994 and in the UK in 1998, fresh allegations were made in November 2016, initially relating to Crewe Alexandra and Manchester City. The scandal then rapidly extended as allegations were made about numerous other abusers at many other UK football clubs. The Football Association, football clubs and police forces quickly established various inquiries and investigations; by July 2018, 300 suspects were reported to have been identified by 849 alleged victims, with 2,807 incidents involving 340 different clubs.

Because of its associations with Bennell, Crewe became the subject of police, media, and football organisation investigations. Bennell was tried, convicted and imprisoned in 2018. According to investigations and media reports, Crewe Alexandra and former manager Dario Gradi faced repeated criticism for their handling of allegations during Bennell's offences, the timing and content of their apologies, and the scope of internal investigations. The Football Association's Sheldon report, published in March 2021, criticised the club for various shortcomings, while Gradi was additionally criticised for his role in 'smoothing over' an unrelated incident while he was assistant manager at Chelsea F.C. in the 1970s. Gradi was suspended from football by the FA in late 2016, and in August 2023 was stripped of his MBE. Crewe chairman John Bowler resigned as a director and chairman of Crewe Alexandra following publication of the FA's report. In addition to criminal prosecutions against the abusers, civil actions for damages were also instigated against their employers, including Crewe Alexandra.

== Initial revelations ==
On 16 November 2016, former Crewe defender Andy Woodward revealed that he had been the victim of child sexual abuse by former football coach Barry Bennell (convicted as a paedophile in 1998) at the club in the 1980s. The club was criticised for its lack of response to the Woodward revelations:

Yet there are so many questions that have never been satisfactorily answered. ... What a cop-out, what a dereliction of duty, for the club, the directors and their media department to think this can be swatted away like a bothersome fly.

Club chairman John Bowler finally responded to the revelations on Monday 21 November, by which time it was reported that six other individuals had contacted the police, and that the Football Association was setting up a helpline. On 22 November, the Guardian reported that Crewe team mate Steve Walters had been another of Bennell's victims, while Woodward criticised Crewe for failing to apologise:

... not one person from Crewe Alexandra has ever contact [sic] me to see if I was OK or to say they were really sorry this happened at their football club. Even now, they’re still failing to say they are really sorry this happened. I need them to say sorry. Everyone who was involved – and there are people coming forward every day – will want them to say sorry but unfortunately this statement doesn’t surprise me and it feels like to me there is almost an air of arrogance on their part.

As two players from other clubs made similar sex abuse revelations about Bennell and an unnamed coach, Dario Gradi was pressed by the Independent and the Guardian "to say more about what he knew and when." On 24 November, Gradi released a statement saying he knew nothing of Bennell's crimes:

I would like to express sympathy to the victims of Barry Bennell not only at Crewe Alexandra, but at other clubs in the North West. The first I knew of Barry Bennell’s crimes was when he was arrested in the United States in 1994. I knew nothing of his crimes before this time when he was employed by us. No-one at the Football Club knew of Bennell’s crimes until his arrest in 1994 and his subsequent prosecution in the United Kingdom. The football club also co-operated fully with the authorities in 2003. The club are in the process of a review and I won’t be making any further comment until this is finalised.

On 25 November, Hamilton Smith, a director at Crewe Alexandra from 1986 to 1990 told the Guardian that the club heard an allegation that Bennell had sexually abused a junior footballer. However, Bennell was allowed to stay at the club, despite the then chairman, Norman Rowlinson, recommending that the club "get him out", so long as Bennell was not left alone with boys and was stopped from arranging overnight stays; it was later (February 2018) reported that Rowlinson had sought police advice about Bennell and had been advised to "move him on". Smith said: "I'm incredibly angry the club continue to refute that they knew anything about suspicions of Bennell’s activities. This was discussed at the club’s top level."

Smith said fellow directors did not want to rely on hearsay evidence and local gossip. Smith later met Tony Pickerin, the FA’s head of education and child protection and requested an investigation into the care of children at Gresty Road. However, he only received a three-line letter from Pickerin saying the FA had “investigated the issues and is satisfied that there is no case to answer.” Smith's allegations were considered in a statement from the club in March 2018; the club expressed concern that, despite Smith apparently being aware of Bennell's offending in 1988, he did not report this to the police until 2016 or the FA until 2001; Smith was also interviewed by the police who, according to the club, concluded "there was no evidence to corroborate that the club was aware of Mr Bennell's offending".

On 27 November 2016, another former Crewe player, Anthony Hughes, revealed that he too had been abused by Bennell. Wales and Manchester United youth player Matthew Monaghan and Crewe trainee, later Wimbledon and Northern Ireland international Mark Williams also alleged abuse by Bennell.

== Bennell trial and conviction ==
Bennell was tried at Liverpool Crown Court in early 2018, and convicted of 50 offences of sexual abuse against 12 boys (and on 20 February 2018 was sentenced to 30 years in prison). After the guilty verdicts on 15 February, victims including Andy Woodward and Steve Walters read statements outside court. Crewe Alexandra expressed its "deepest sympathies" to Bennell's victims, saying it was not aware of any sexual abuse by Bennell nor had it received any complaint about sexual abuse by him before or during his employment with the club. This has been disputed: the Guardian said Bennell had to leave Crewe following a complaint against him, having been identified as a risk long before joining Crewe, amid a cover-up at Manchester City. Lord Carlile, the barrister who prosecuted Bennell in 1998, accused Crewe of 'brushing the scandal under the carpet'.

Following complaints from other former players, mostly from Manchester City and Crewe, Bennell was reported to be likely to face a further trial. In September 2018, it was reported that the police and Crown Prosecution Service regarded some of allegations, particularly the rape of minors, as serious enough to warrant criminal action, potentially in 2019.

On 25 February 2019, the Guardian reported on a nine-page statement from Gradi about what he knew regarding Bennell. Gradi admitted to encouraging a close player-coach culture and to not making detailed background checks about Bennell because Crewe was trying to poach him from Manchester City "on the quiet". Club chairman John Bowler said Crewe had not appreciated the dangers of football being used as a means for a paedophile to prey on young boys ("documented procedures that are now in place for the protection of minors were not in place at that time"), while Gradi had not made detailed inquiries into Bennell's background ("He did not have any specific coaching qualifications but none were required and at the time the FA did not publish any guidance on child protection”). However, former club secretary Gill Palin had been uncomfortable about Bennell. Three days later, Steve Walters alleged that Crewe showed 'no humanity' and engaged in 'victim blaming' in its legal response to abuse claims, and of claiming Walters had waited too long to report abuse. The club said Walters's claims included (unspecified) "fundamental inaccuracies". Walters and at least one other former Crewe player have each launched High Court damages claims of upwards of against the club.

On 19 March 2019, the Guardian reported Crewe Alexandra planned to contest victims' claims, using specialist lawyers – appointed for the club by Football League insurers – with experience of defending child sex abuse allegations involving the Roman Catholic church. The lawyers argued the club should not be liable for alleged incidents from the 1980s and 1990s that were not committed as part of Bennell's official club duties (Bennell allegedly also ran a feeder team, Railway Juniors, set up by parents) and also argued that, under the Limitation Act 1980, the incidents should be disregarded as victims has not reported them years earlier. However, on 27 March 2019, the Guardian reported an apparent U-turn in Crewe's approach; it had agreed an out-of-court financial settlement with one of Bennell's victims. Andy Woodward had unsuccessfully sued Crewe for damages in 2004. In May 2020, two of eight men sexually abused by Barry Bennell, who were pursuing damages claims against Manchester City, were reported to be also bringing claims against Crewe Alexandra; an eight-week trial started in October 2021.

== Crewe enquiry ==
On 26 November 2016 the club announced it would be holding an independent review into how they dealt with historical child sex abuse allegations: "an independent review, to be conducted via the appointment of external legal counsel, is the correct way forward".

Fifteen months later, in February 2018, the club had not started this review, claiming an unnamed authority told them to hold off until the criminal case was over. On 2 March 2018, the club issued a statement saying that, as it had fully supported and co-operated with the police's detailed and comprehensive investigations, it did "not intend to commission a further independent investigation to duplicate the thorough enquiries that have already been undertaken," and the police's report had also been supplied to the FA review headed by Clive Sheldon.

Crewe's decision to shelve its own investigation was criticised by local MP Laura Smith (daughter of former club director Hamilton Smith) who said victims deserved nothing less than a thorough investigation which "should be transparent and leave no stone unturned." The club was also excluded from the NorthWest Football Awards, was criticised by MP Damian Collins, chair of the DCMS select committee, and by Crewe Town Council, and was called to reconsider its decision by the Professional Footballers Association's Gordon Taylor. In March 2018, Clive Sheldon warned clubs they must hold their own investigations into abuse claims or he will do it, putting pressure on Crewe to reconsider its decision not to hold an inquiry. In his final report, published in March 2021, Sheldon said he "liaised with the Club and its lawyers with a view to suggesting other lines of enquiry that could usefully be followed up by the Club. Ultimately, the Club agreed to conduct those further enquiries, and provided me with a report setting out its conclusions."

== FA Sheldon report criticisms ==
The FA's 710-page report was published on 17 March 2021, identifying failures to act adequately on complaints or rumours of sexual abuse at eight professional clubs including Crewe. Considering whether senior Crewe people knew about Bennell, Sheldon concluded they had not received specific reports of abuse (a conclusion also reached by Cheshire constabulary). However, Norman Rowlinson, John Bowler and Hamilton Smith had discussed concerns about inappropriate behaviour: "... during Bennell's time at the Club, there were rumours circulating about [Bennell] and his sexual interest in children which were heard by some of the Club's staff, including Dario Gradi." The club "should have done more to check on the well-being of the boys", Sheldon said. Following publication of the report, the FA's CEO Mark Bullingham said Gradi was "effectively banned for life" from football; the FA legal director said it was "for safeguarding reasons" but that was "as far as we can go". There were also calls for Crewe chairman John Bowler to resign, including from the club's own supporters group; Bowler announced his resignation on 25 March 2021.

On 18 March 2021, Crewe Alexandra apologised to all survivors of Bennell's abuse. They expressed "wholehearted regret" about their ignorance of his crimes, acknowledged "more could have been done to monitor" him, and said they are "sorry to every survivor of abuse". The club's statement also said: "The club fully understands the additional hurt and trauma to the victims and survivors of Mr Bennell which has been caused by the fact that no one at the club was aware of the offences being committed upon them at the time." They sincerely regretted and were "disgusted by the terrible crimes committed" by Bennell. On 19 March, Gradi apologised, saying: "I wish to express my deepest sympathy for the survivors and their families. I sincerely and personally regret that the harm being caused to these young people was not discovered at the time. I apologise for not recognising any signs of abuse at the time. It was "not the case" that he had not been banned from all football-related activity, he said: "I am suspended indefinitely from certain specified activities with players under the age of 18 years and whilst I do not agree with it, I understand how the decision was arrived at."

Following Bowler's resignation, on 29 March 2021 acting chairman Charles Grant said the club wanted to "engage with survivors" and learn from the "very painful lessons" of the scandal, saying "I would like to learn, from the football club's point of view, what it is we can do with survivor groups, with individuals, to try and make reparations, in some small part." A number of victims ("in 'double figures'") subsequently met with Crewe Alexandra directors and staff; Steve Walters was the first to visit and was said have felt welcomed back to the club and "not bitter any more".

Awarded an MBE in 1998, Gradi was stripped of the award in August 2023 following professional disbarment for failing to protect children from sexual abuse.

== Additional allegations ==
=== Gradi and Chelsea F.C. ===
Gradi was also the subject of allegations that, as Chelsea's assistant manager, he tried to "smooth over" a youth player's complaint of sexual assault against Chelsea chief scout Eddie Heath in 1974. On 6 December 2016, the Football Association announced Gradi would be among the first to be targeted by its inquiry over the 'smoothing over' allegation. In connection with these allegations, on 11 December 2016, the FA announced that it had suspended Gradi. Gradi subsequently said he had been notified by the FA of his interim suspension from football on 25 November, and reiterated "that I will do everything within my power to assist all investigatory authorities." In February 2017, it was reported that Gradi planned to appeal against his FA suspension from football, feeling he had been left "in limbo". In August 2019, Chelsea's board apologised "unreservedly" for allowing Heath, a "prolific and manipulative sexual abuser", to operate "unchallenged". The apology followed an inquiry led by barrister Charles Geekie QC, who was also critical of former assistant manager Gradi. He was accused of failing to tell senior club staff about a sexual conduct allegation concerning Heath made by the parent of a young player. The FA's Sheldon Review could not decide whether Gradi had informed the club's acting manager, Ron Suart, of concerns raised at a meeting with the player’s father, but, either way, said Gradi's or Suart's responses were inadequate.

=== Other cases involving Crewe ===
On 5 January 2017, the FA suspended former youth coach Paul McCann, who volunteered at Crewe in the 1980s and 1990s and was an assistant coach of the club's youth team. Almost a year later, on 2 January 2018, McCann, 57, was charged with non-recent sexual offences including indecent assaults. At Chester Crown Court on 31 January McCann denied the charges and was released on unconditional bail ahead of an October 2018 trial; on 18 October 2018 McCann was found not guilty of all charges against him.

In October 2018, the Guardian reported that a Crewe coach, Carl Everall, had been suspended because of a safeguarding issue, and was subject to an FA investigation. After pleading guilty to grooming a teenage girl, in May 2019 at Chester Crown Court, Everall was ordered to go on a sexual offenders treatment programme, given a three-year community order, a 35-day rehabilitation activity requirement and a sexual harm prevention order, and was ordered to sign the sex offenders register for five years.
