= Neil Lennon =

Northern Irish footballer and manager (born 1971)

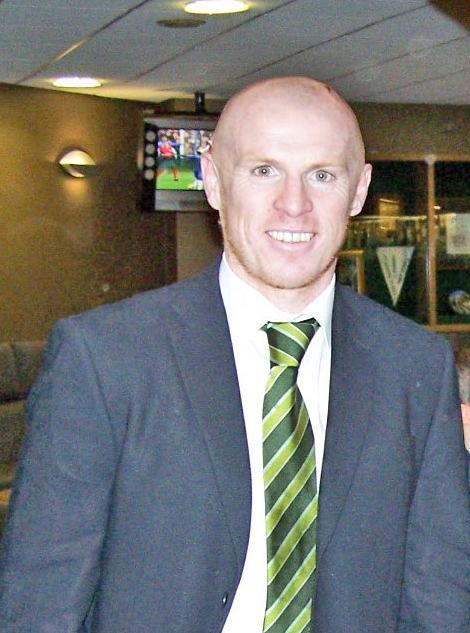
- Lennon at Celtic Park in 2006

Personal information
- Full name: Neil Francis Lennon
- Date of birth: 25 June 1971 (age 55)
- Place of birth: Lurgan, Northern Ireland
- Height: 5 ft 9 in (1.75 m)
- Position: Midfielder

Team information
- Current team: Dunfermline Athletic (manager)

Youth career
- Lurgan Celtic
- 1986–1987: Glenavon
- 1987–1989: Manchester City

Senior career*
Years	Team	Apps	(Gls)
1986–1987	Glenavon	2	(1)
1987–1990	Manchester City	1	(0)
1990–1996	Crewe Alexandra	147	(15)
1996–2000	Leicester City	170	(6)
2000–2007	Celtic	214	(3)
2007–2008	Nottingham Forest	18	(0)
2008	Wycombe Wanderers	9	(0)
Total		561	(25)

International career
1990–1994	Northern Ireland U21	2	(0)
1990	Northern Ireland U23	2	(0)
1994	Northern Ireland B	1	(0)
1994–2002	Northern Ireland	40	(2)

Managerial career
- 2009–2010: Celtic B
- 2010–2014: Celtic
- 2014–2016: Bolton Wanderers
- 2016–2019: Hibernian
- 2019–2021: Celtic
- 2022: Omonia
- 2024: Rapid București
- 2025–: Dunfermline Athletic
- * Club domestic league appearances and goals

Neil Francis Lennon (born 25 June 1971) is a Northern Irish professional football manager and former player who currently manages Scottish Championship club Dunfermline Athletic.

During his playing career he represented English clubs Manchester City, Crewe Alexandra and Leicester City. Lennon moved to Celtic in 2000, where he made over 200 appearances and was appointed captain in 2005. Before retiring as a player, he returned to England and played for Nottingham Forest and Wycombe Wanderers. Lennon also earned 40 caps for the Northern Ireland national team over nine years, scoring two goals.

Lennon was appointed manager of former club Celtic in March 2010, initially in a caretaker capacity, following the departure of Tony Mowbray. Lennon enjoyed significant success as Celtic manager, winning three Scottish league championships, two Scottish Cups, qualifying for the group stage of the Champions League twice and the knockout stages once, before leaving the club in May 2014. After an unsuccessful spell back in England with Bolton Wanderers, marred by the club's financial problems, Lennon returned to Scottish football in 2016 with Hibernian. He led them to promotion back to the Scottish Premiership in his first season as head coach, and European qualification in his second season, before leaving Hibernian in January 2019.

Lennon returned to Celtic in February 2019, initially on an interim basis for the rest of the 2018–19 season, and guided them to the league and Scottish Cup titles. His contract was renewed and he led Celtic to the Scottish league title again in 2019–20. He also led the team to a fourth consecutive domestic treble by also winning the League Cup and the Scottish Cup that season. Lennon left Celtic in February 2021, as the club had fallen far behind Rangers in the 2020–21 Scottish Premiership.

Lennon returned to football a year later, becoming the new manager of Cypriot club Omonia in March 2022. Less than three months after arriving on the island, he led the club to win the Cypriot Cup, their first since 2012. He was sacked in October 2022 due to disappointing results in the domestic league.

== Early life ==
Neil Francis Lennon was born on 25 June 1971 in Lurgan, County Armagh, and attended St Michael's Grammar School in the town. As a youngster he played Gaelic football for the school and was also selected for the Armagh minor team. He grew up supporting Celtic and played football for the local Lurgan Celtic youth team.

== Club career ==
=== Early career ===
Lennon joined Glenavon, after reaching the final of the Milk Cup with Glenavon Select and scored on his Irish League debut. He then joined Manchester City as a trainee in 1987. He made one first team appearance during his time in Manchester, a league match on 30 April 1988 away against Birmingham City, before signing for Crewe Alexandra on a free transfer in August 1990. Lennon made his debut for Crewe on 18 September 1990 against Reading. Despite missing the whole of season 1991–92 due to a back injury, he became an established member of the side and impressed with his intelligent play and consistent performances. Lennon's form saw him make his debut for Northern Ireland in 1994, and thus became the first Crewe Alexandra player in 60 years to win a full international cap. In 5 1/2 years at Crewe, Lennon made 187 appearances for the club and scored 18 goals.

=== Leicester City ===
In February 1996, Lennon signed for Leicester City for a fee of £750,000 (£1,500,000 today). In May 1996, Lennon played in the Leicester City side that defeated Crystal Palace 2–1 at Wembley in the Play-off Final to win promotion to the Premier League. On 16 April 1997, Lennon picked up his first major winner's medal when Leicester won 1–0 against Middlesbrough in a replayed League Cup Final. He played in a further two League Cup Finals during his time at Filbert Street, losing 1-0 to Tottenham Hotspur in March 1999 but winning 2–1 against Tranmere Rovers in February 2000.

An on-field incident during a league match in 1998 against Newcastle United between Lennon and Alan Shearer resulted in the England international being charged with misconduct by the FA, Television footage showed Shearer appearing to intentionally kick Lennon in the head following a challenge. The referee of the game took no action against Shearer. Shearer apologised afterwards, but denied that the contact with Lennon was deliberate, and Lennon later gave evidence in Shearer's defence at the FA hearing which subsequently cleared the Newcastle and England striker of all charges.

=== Celtic ===
After Martin O'Neill became the new manager of Celtic in June 2000, he made several attempts to sign Lennon. After months of protracted negotiations with Leicester, on 6 December Lennon joined the club he supported as a boy for a fee of £5.75 million. That season saw Lennon pick-up three winner's medals as Celtic won a domestic treble; the Scottish Premier League, Scottish Cup and Scottish League Cup. The next four seasons at Celtic saw Lennon win a further two league championships and two Scottish Cups. He was also an integral part of the Celtic side that reached the UEFA Cup Final in 2003, losing 3-2 to Porto after extra time.

When Gordon Strachan took over from O'Neill as manager in the summer of 2005, he made Lennon the new club captain. In January 2006, when Leicester sacked Craig Levein, Lennon was linked with a return to the Midlands side in a player-manager role. He went on record saying he was flattered but wanted to captain Celtic to the Scottish Premier League title.

Although he was also linked with a move to Crystal Palace in a player-manager role in the summer of 2006, on 23 June 2006, Celtic announced he had signed a new one-year contract. Sunderland manager Roy Keane made an attempt to sign Lennon prior to the closure of the August 2006 transfer window, but his approach for the player was rejected by Celtic. On 25 April 2007, Lennon announced he would be leaving Celtic, and in his last game for the club on 26 May 2007, he captained the team to victory in the Scottish Cup Final against Dunfermline Athletic. Celtic's 1–0 win clinched the League and Cup Double.

=== Later career ===
Lennon joined League One club Nottingham Forest on a one-year contract with an option for a second year on 12 June 2007. He made his debut captaining the side in a 0–0 draw at home to AFC Bournemouth. He missed a week's training with Forest in November 2007, because of family reasons in Scotland, and lost his place in the team as a consequence.

Lennon joined Wycombe Wanderers of League Two on a free transfer on 31 January 2008, managed by his former Celtic midfield partner Paul Lambert. He left on 3 April to take up a coaching role with Celtic.

== International career ==
Lennon made his international debut for Northern Ireland on 11 June 1994 when he come on as a substitute in a friendly against Mexico in Miami. He had to wait nearly a year for his next cap when he played against Chile in another friendly. Lennon made his first competitive appearance three months later on 3 September 1995 in a European Championship qualifier away against Portugal. After that, Lennon became a fixture in the international side although Northern Ireland were unsuccessful in their attempts to qualify for the finals of major tournaments.

Lennon decided to retire from international football in August 2002 upon receiving a death threat before a Northern Ireland match against Cyprus. The threats came after his alleged claim that he wanted to play for a team representing a United Ireland. The threat was allegedly made by the Loyalist Volunteer Force, although the organisation later denied this.

Lennon was capped 40 times by Northern Ireland, scoring two goals. He also captained the team on several occasions.

=== International stats ===
Appearances and goals by national team and year
National team	Year	Apps	Goals
Northern Ireland	1994	1	0
Northern Ireland	1995	4	0
Northern Ireland	1996	5	1
Northern Ireland	1997	8	0
Northern Ireland	1998	6	1
Northern Ireland	1999	7	0
Northern Ireland	2000	4	0
Northern Ireland	2001	4	0
Northern Ireland	2002	1	0
Total		40	2

=== International goals ===
Scores and results list Northern Ireland's goal tally first

Goal	Date	Venue	Opponent	Score	Result	Competition
1	5 October 1996	Windsor Park, Belfast, Northern Ireland	Armenia	1–0	1–1	1998 World Cup qualification
2	18 October 1998	Windsor Park, Belfast, Northern Ireland	Moldova	2–2	2–2	Euro 2000 qualification

== Managerial career ==
Lennon was linked with the vacant manager's job at Hibernian after the resignation of John Collins, but the job was given to Mixu Paatelainen. Lennon's first coaching appointment was as first team coach with Celtic in 2008. After the appointment of Tony Mowbray as Celtic manager, Lennon took charge of the Celtic reserve team.

Celtic won the Jock Stein Friendship Cup match on penalties in his first match. With no reserve league, the team played a series of friendlies in Ireland against the first teams of Cork City, Drogheda United, Shamrock Rovers, and Cliftonville, losing only once. They played several times in England against Blackburn Rovers, Everton, Chelsea, Huddersfield Town, Newcastle United and Sunderland.

=== Celtic ===
Following Mowbray's departure from Celtic on 25 March 2010, Lennon was appointed caretaker manager for the remainder of the 2009–10 season. He appointed former teammate Johan Mjällby as his assistant. Celtic won all of their remaining league games under Lennon, including wins over Kilmarnock, Hibernian, and Rangers, but lost 2–0 to First Division side Ross County in the semi-final of the Scottish Cup. In the aftermath of that defeat, Lennon spoke frankly about the Celtic players and their performances over the course of the season. He said that they had lacked "hunger and desire" and that whether he was installed as manager or not, he would be recommending a significant clear-out of players to the board.

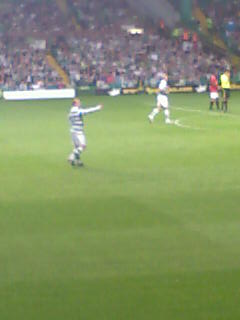
Neil Lennon returned to play for Celtic in the John Kennedy testimonial match, 9 August 2011

Lennon was appointed manager of Celtic on a full-time basis on 9 June 2010. He retained Mjällby as his assistant, as well as former Celtic teammate Alan Thompson and former Leicester City teammate Garry Parker as first-team coaches

He made considerable changes to the Celtic team for the 2010–11 season. He sold Aiden McGeady for a then Scottish record £9.5 million along with captain Stephen McManus and goalkeeper Artur Boruc. 13 other players also left the club, this gave Lennon enough funds to re-build for the new season. Lennon then went on to sign several talented, young, cheap, relatively unknown players, from smaller leagues around the world; striker Gary Hooper arrived from English side Scunthorpe, Israeli international Beram Kayal was signed, and Honduran left-back Emilio Izaguirre also signed on. Lennon also signed several experienced players on free transfers. Charlie Mulgrew, Joe Ledley, and Daniel Majstorović all went into the first team. In addition to these Lennon also signed five other players, including Fraser Forster on loan from Newcastle who became first choice 'keeper and helped set a new SPL record for most clean sheets.

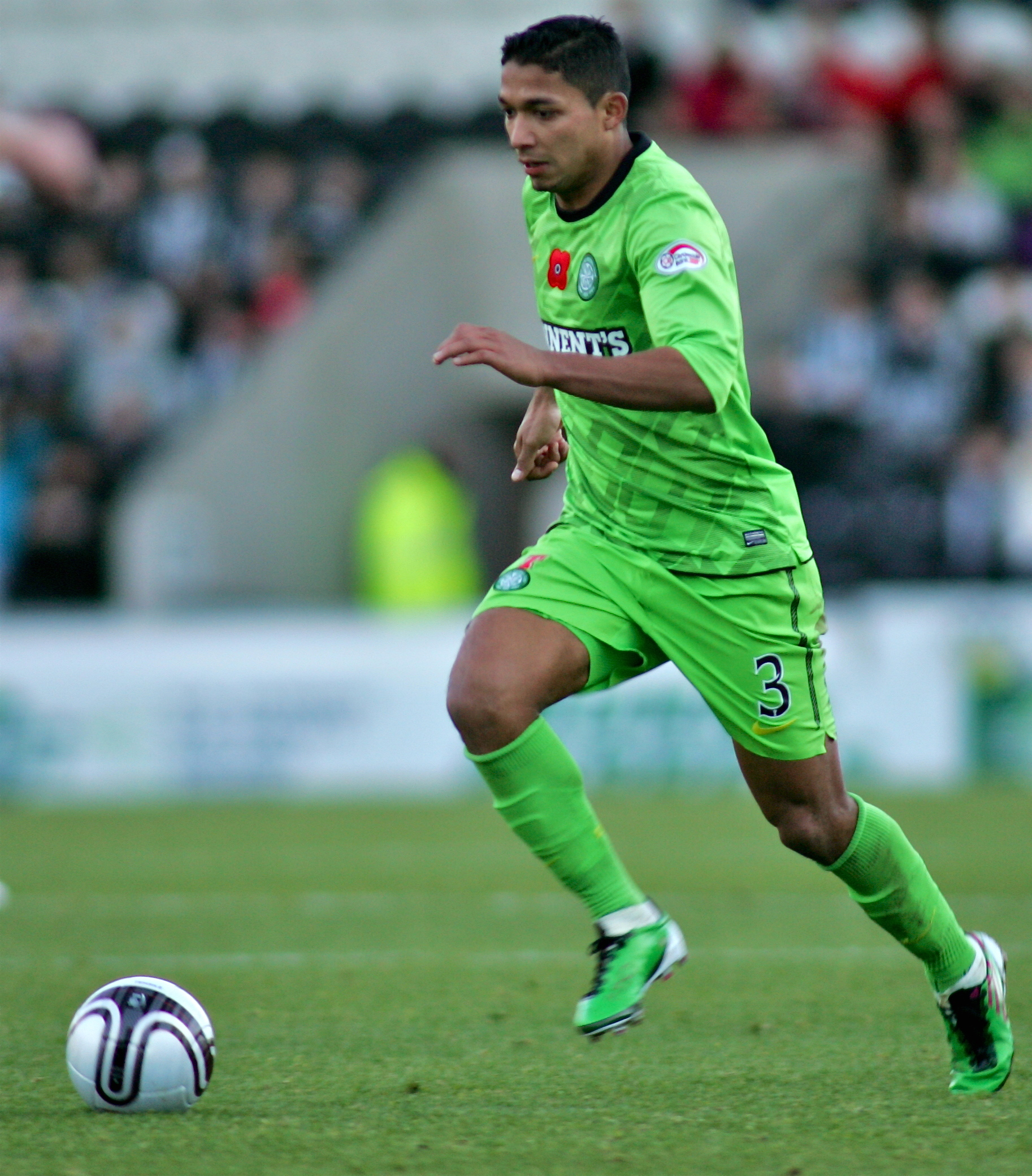
Emilio Izaguirre was voted SPFA Player of the Year in 2011

On 28 July, in his first competitive game as full-time manager, Celtic lost 3–0 away to Braga in the UEFA Champions League. Celtic won their first eight league matches under Lennon, although controversy erupted in their 2–1 win away at Dundee United on 17 October 2010. Celtic were awarded a penalty kick in the second half, but the decision was then rescinded by referee Dougie McDonald. McDonald explained after the match that he over-ruled the penalty award on the advice of the assistant referee. Lennon reluctantly accepted McDonald's explanation, commenting "I suppose you have to put it down to another honest mistake by the referee." It was, however, later revealed that McDonald had lied in his explanation over the penalty award and the referee subsequently resigned several weeks later having received a warning from the Scottish Football Association after failing to properly explain his overturning of the penalty award. Further refereeing controversy ensued the following week when Celtic lost their unbeaten run in the league, losing 3–1 at home against Rangers. The Ibrox club's third goal came as a result of penalty awarded when Rangers' Kirk Broadfoot fell to the ground under a challenge from Celtic's Daniel Majstorović. Lennon stated afterwards that he felt the referee "got a couple of decisions wrong", and added regarding the penalty, "I'm not sure that he saw it so I don't know why he's given it. He's got a lot of questions to answer". In November, Lennon led Celtic to a 9–0 win over Aberdeen, a record win in the Scottish Premier League and Aberdeen's heaviest ever defeat. Celtic lost their next game 2–0 away against Hearts, with Celtic's Joe Ledley sent off for the first time in his career for a "strong" challenge on Ian Black. Celtic were later denied a penalty award in the second half, and shortly afterwards Lennon was sent to the stand by the referee. Lennon defended Ledley after the match, describing referee Craig Thomson's decision as "ridiculous". Lennon was later given a six match touchline ban for excessive misconduct as a result of the incident in the Hearts' game, although it was later reduced to four matches after appeal. He was given another four match touchline ban by the SFA following an altercation with Rangers assistant manager Ally McCoist after a Scottish Cup match in March 2011.

Lennon led Celtic to the final of the League Cup in March 2011, but they lost 2–1 to Rangers after extra time. They remained in contention for the SPL title until the final day of the 2010–11 season, when they won 4–0 at home to Motherwell, but finished a point behind Rangers. He won his first silverware as a manager when Celtic beat Motherwell 3–0 in the Scottish Cup Final a week later.

After rallying from a poor start to season 2011–12, Lennon won the SPL Manager of the Month award for November 2011. The club went on to win the 2011–12 Scottish Premier League and Lennon was made SFWA Manager of the Year. Lennon then guided Celtic through two qualification rounds to reach the group stage of the 2012–13 UEFA Champions League, where Celtic beat Barcelona one day after the club's 125th birthday. Celtic qualified out of their group to the knock-out stages of the Champions League. Celtic were comfortably beaten on aggregate by Juventus in the last 16 round, but both Celtic and Lennon were still praised for their overall Champions League campaign. On 21 April 2013, Celtic retained the Premier League title. Lennon finished the season by leading Celtic to a League and Cup double with a 3–0 win over Hibernian in the Scottish Cup Final.

Celtic qualified for the group stages of the Champions League again the following season, but had a dismal campaign; winning only once with a 2–1 home win over Ajax, and slumping to a 6–1 rout away against Barcelona in the final group match. They fared little better in the domestic cup competitions; losing 1-0 to Morton in their first game in the Scottish League Cup, and losing 2-1 to Aberdeen in the fourth round of the Scottish Cup. The League campaign was much more impressive through; undefeated until February and losing only once in all over the course of the season in which they scored 102 goals on the way to their third successive League title. On 22 May 2014, Lennon announced that he was leaving Celtic after four years as manager. "I have parted company with Celtic," he said in a brief statement, adding "The club are in a very strong position and I wish the fans and the club all the very best for the future."

=== Bolton Wanderers ===
Lennon was announced as the new manager of Bolton Wanderers on 12 October 2014, signing a four-year contract. He won his first game in charge 1–0 against Birmingham City at St Andrew's stadium, although he was sent to the stands in the 81st minute after an altercation with referee Mark Haywood caused by Lennon leaving his technical area before Craig Davies's penalty was saved. Lennon's first three months in charge saw Bolton rise ten places from bottom of the league up to fourteenth; a spell that included an eight match unbeaten run and four consecutive clean sheets. Bolton reached the fourth round of the FA Cup and took Liverpool to a replay before conceding a last minute goal to lose 2–1 and go out. Things didn't go well for Lennon thereafter, with Bolton winning only one of their last 11 games of the season, and Barry Bannan and Neil Danns being suspended by Lennon for off-field indiscipline. Bolton did however succeed in avoiding relegation, finishing 18th in the league.

Bolton struggled at the start of the following season, and by October 2015 were lying bottom of the table with only one win in their first eleven league games. Lennon maintained confidence in his ability to improve Bolton's fortunes, stating "I didn't realise quite how tough it was going to be but I have got faith in my own ability and I believe we'll turn things around." By the end of November 2015, Bolton had gone on a run of twelve games without a win, and remained bottom of the Championship. At this time, the club announced that their squad had not been paid this month "due to a short-term funding issue" in a statement which came hours before their 1–1 draw with Brentford. In that game, Bolton striker Gary Madine was seen on television mouthing an insult towards Lennon, although the manager played down the incident afterwards, stating "I don't know what he said. He's a Geordie, I can't understand him! It was probably reciprocated!" Bolton continued to struggle and, with the club at the bottom of the table, Lennon left by "mutual consent" on 15 March 2016.

=== Hibernian ===
Lennon was appointed head coach of Scottish Championship club Hibernian in June 2016. He led the "Hibees" to the Scottish Championship title and promotion back to the Scottish Premiership (after a three-season absence) in his first season. In September 2017, Lennon and Hibs agreed to extend his contract to the end of the 2019–20 season. Hibs finished fourth in the 2017–18 Scottish Premiership and qualified for the Europa League.

On 25 January 2019, Lennon was suspended by Hibernian following an exchange with other club employees. On 30 January, it was announced that he and assistant coach Garry Parker had left the club by mutual consent. A club statement said that "neither Neil nor Garry has been guilty of any misconduct or wrongdoing and no disciplinary process has been commenced. The suspension, put in place to allow an internal review, was lifted by the club as part of this agreement."

=== Return to Celtic ===
On 26 February 2019, Lennon was appointed manager of Celtic for a second time, taking over until the end of the campaign following Brendan Rodgers' mid-season departure for Leicester City. Having helped the club achieve an unprecedented third domestic treble ("treble treble"), Lennon was appointed permanent manager for a second time at the end of the season. The 2019–20 season saw very similar success, even following the suspension of professional football as a result of the COVID-19 pandemic. The season was later curtailed and the title awarded to Celtic, who were thirteen points clear at the time of suspension, equalling the national record of nine consecutive championships set by Celtic in the 1970s and matched by Rangers in the 1990s. In addition to the league, they were once again victorious in the League and Scottish cups, giving the club their fourth consecutive domestic treble.

Following a positive start to the 2020–21 campaign, Lennon came under significant criticism after the club underwent a poor run of results that began with a 2–0 Old Firm home loss to Rangers on 17 October; this was followed by failure to qualify for the Champions League group stage, elimination from the Europa League in the group stage and elimination from the League Cup in the second round, ending the possibility of a fifth consecutive treble. As calls were made for Lennon to be sacked and fans began to protest outside Celtic Park following their elimination from the League Cup, the board of directors released a statement on 7 December in which they voiced full support of Lennon and his back room staff. After a brief turnaround in results, Celtic lost the second Old Firm game of the season on 2 January, and calls were once again made for Lennon to be removed from his position as hopes of a historic tenth title faded.

Lennon was also criticised for taking the squad on a training trip to Dubai in January, during which two players contracted COVID-19; health protocols meant that 13 players and three coaches, including Lennon, had to be quarantined for 10 days after they returned. They consequently missed league matches with Hibernian and Livingston, both of which were drawn. There were more fan protests after a home defeat by St Mirren, the first time the Paisley club had won at Celtic Park since 1990. Despite previously stating that he would not resign, Lennon left the club on 24 February 2021 following a 1–0 defeat to Ross County, which left Celtic 18 points behind Rangers in the title race.

=== Omonia ===
On 8 March 2022, Lennon was appointed head coach of Cypriot First Division side Omonia on a two-and-a-half-year deal, replacing former Rangers defender Henning Berg. On 25 May, Lennon led the club to their first trophy under his leadership, as they defeated Ethnikos Achna on penalties to win the Cypriot Cup; during extra time, Lennon received a red card and was ordered to leave the touchline by the referee.

Ahead of the 2022–23 season, Lennon recruited players who he had managed at former clubs, including Adam Matthews and Gary Hooper, whom he had managed at Celtic, and Brandon Barker, whom he had managed at Hibernian. After defeat in the Cypriot Super Cup to Apollon Limassol, Lennon's Omonia team shocked Belgian side Gent 4–0 on aggregate to qualify for the UEFA Europa League group stage. Despite respectable showings against Manchester United and Real Sociedad in the group stage, Lennon was sacked on 18 October 2022 due to disappointing results in the domestic league, including losses to newly-promoted sides Akritas Chlorakas and Nea Salamis.

=== Rapid București ===
On 20 May 2024, Lennon was officially presented as the manager of Liga I club Rapid București, joining the Romanian side on a two-year deal. On 20 August 2024, just after signing twelve players and recording no wins in six matches, Lennon was sacked after three months in charge.

=== Dunfermline Athletic ===
On 21 March 2025, Lennon was appointed manager of Scottish Championship side Dunfermline Athletic, on a short-term deal until the end of the season. After helping the club avoid relegation in the 2024–25 season, Lennon signed a two-year contract with Dunfermline in May 2025.

== Personal life ==
Lennon has spoken about having suffered from depression since 2000.

In January 2011, Lennon reached an out-of-court settlement with the Bank of Ireland after a company of which he was a director defaulted on a €3.7 million loan.

While a young player at Crewe, Lennon was a friend of Andy Woodward and Steve Walters, both of whom were victims of sexual abuse by coach Barry Bennell. After Bennell's 2018 conviction, Lennon spoke of his regret at not being aware of the abuse at the time.

He is a supporter of his home-town team Lurgan Celtic.

== Managerial statistics ==
As of match played 6 November 2026

Managerial record by team and tenure
Team	Nat	From	To	Record					Ref.
Team	Nat	From	To	P	W	D	L	Win %	Ref.
Celtic	SCO	25 March 2010	22 May 2014	227	159	29	39	70.04	
Bolton Wanderers	ENG	12 October 2014	15 March 2016	79	18	26	35	22.78	
Hibernian	SCO	8 June 2016	30 January 2019	123	59	40	24	47.97	(Note: Soccerbase include the match played on 27 January 2019, a win against St Mirren, which was taken by Eddie May and Grant Murray because Lennon was suspended prior to formally leaving the club on 30 January.)
Celtic	SCO	26 February 2019	24 February 2021	110	77	17	16	70.00	
Omonia	CYP	8 March 2022	18 October 2022	29	11	8	10	37.93	
Rapid București	ROM	20 May 2024	20 August 2024	6	0	5	1	0.00	
Dunfermline Athletic	SCO	21 March 2025	present	77	33	21	23	42.86	
Total				650	357	145	148	54.92	

== Honours ==
=== Player ===
Crewe Alexandra

- Football League Third Division promotion: 1993–94

Leicester City

- Football League Cup: 1996–97, 1999–2000; runner-up: 1998–99
- Football League First Division play-offs: 1996

Celtic

- Scottish Premier League: 2000–01, 2001–02, 2003–04, 2005–06, 2006–07
- Scottish Cup: 2000–01, 2003–04, 2004–05, 2006–07
- Scottish League Cup: 2000–01, 2005–06
- UEFA Cup runner-up: 2002–03

Nottingham Forest

- Football League One promotion: 2007–08

Individual

- PFA Team of the Year: 1993–94 Third Division, 1994–95 Second Division, 1995–96 Second Division

=== Manager ===
Celtic

- Scottish Premier League / Premiership: 2011–12, 2012–13, 2013–14, 2018–19, 2019–20
- Scottish Cup: 2010–11, 2012–13, 2018–19, 2019–20
- Scottish League Cup: 2019–20

Hibernian

- Scottish Championship: 2016–17

Omonia

- Cypriot Cup: 2021–22

== Awards and achievements ==
Player

- PFA Team of the Year (Third Division): 1993–94
- PFA Team of the Year (Second Division) (2): 1994–95, 1995–96
- Northern Ireland International Personality of the Year (1): 2001
- Celtic FC Player of the Year (2): 2003–04, 2005–06

Manager

- SPL Manager of the Year: 2011–12
- SFWA Manager of the Year (3): 2011–12, 2012–13, 2019–20
- Sunday Mail Sports Awards Editors' Choice: 2012
- SPL Player of the Month (3): March 2001, March 2004, April 2007
- SPL Manager of the Month (8): September 2010, January 2011, April 2011, November 2011, December 2011, February 2012, April 2012, December 2012
- SPFL Premiership Manager of the Month (3): December 2013, January 2014, October 2017
- SPFL Championship Manager of the Month (2): August 2016, January 2017
