= Dario Gradi =

Footballer and football manager (born 1941)

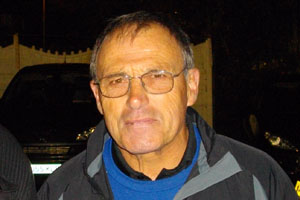
- Gradi in 2010

Personal information
- Full name: Dario Gradi
- Date of birth: 8 July 1941 (age 85)
- Place of birth: Milan, Italy
- Position: Defender

Senior career*
Years	Team	Apps	(Gls)
1969–1970	Sutton United		
1971	Tooting & Mitcham United		

Managerial career
- 1976–1977: Sutton United
- 1978–1981: Wimbledon
- 1981: Crystal Palace
- 1983–2007: Crewe Alexandra
- 2008: Crewe Alexandra (caretaker)
- 2009–2011: Crewe Alexandra
- * Club domestic league appearances and goals

Dario Gradi (born 8 July 1941) is an Italian-English former football player, coach and manager. He was associated for more than 36 years with Crewe Alexandra, where he was variously manager, director of football and director of the Academy, until October 2019.

Gradi played as an amateur for clubs in the London area (and won an England amateur cap); he then took on various coaching roles in the region. His first major managerial success was achieved with Wimbledon after which he briefly managed Crystal Palace in 1981.

Gradi had a 24-year first spell as manager of Crewe between 1983 and 2007. He stepped down from his managerial role in 2007, handing first-team responsibilities to Steve Holland, and became technical director. At that time, Gradi was the longest-serving manager of an English football league club. After two further spells as Crewe manager, he finally stepped down in November 2011 to focus on the club's youth system, after managing Crewe in 1,359 first team games.

In late 2016, as the United Kingdom football sexual abuse scandal expanded, Gradi's roles at Crewe at the time of alleged offences in the 1980s and at Chelsea in the early 1970s were the subject of media scrutiny. The Chelsea allegations led to Gradi being suspended by The Football Association in November 2016. Gradi denied any wrongdoing and in February 2017 was planning an appeal against his FA suspension. He was heavily criticised by Chelsea's inquiry report, published in August 2019, and in the FA's Sheldon Report, published in March 2021 – when the FA said Gradi (who had retired from all football roles in October 2019) was "effectively banned for life" from football "for safeguarding reasons". While accepting he had been suspended indefinitely from certain activities, Gradi said he had not been banned. Awarded an MBE for services to football in 1998, Gradi was stripped of the award in 2023 for failing to protect children from sexual abuse.

== Early life and playing career ==
Born to an Italian father (who died when Dario was still a child) and an English mother, Gradi moved to London, aged four, when his mother returned after the Second World War in 1945.

He attended Glyn Grammar School in Epsom, and trained as a teacher of physical education at what is now Loughborough University from 1960 to 1963 (where he played for the university's first XI football team, alongside Bob Wilson and Barry Hines), before returning to teach at his former school.

By this time he had already played as an amateur for Sutton United and for Tooting & Mitcham United in the early 1960s. He was later capped once for England's amateur side (playing in the team's British Amateur Championship tie against Scotland in Dundee in September 1967). He later rejoined Sutton United, playing in the FA Amateur Cup Final against North Shields in April 1969, and in the club's FA Cup 4th round tie against Leeds United in January 1970. Gradi also played for Wycombe Wanderers, long before the club became fully professional.

== Coaching career ==
After a period of teaching, Gradi became a London regional coach for the FA; this caused him to lose his amateur status and become ineligible to continue his playing career. He had a spell coaching at east London's Senrab F.C., and was appointed assistant coach at Chelsea in 1971 at the age of just 29. This was followed by coaching posts at Derby County (first team coach, 1977–78), and, later, a two-year spell at Leyton Orient (youth team coach, 1981–83).

== Managerial career ==
=== Sutton United ===
Gradi managed Sutton United from 1976 to 1977.

=== Wimbledon ===
He took over as manager of Wimbledon in January 1978, helping the Plough Lane side win promotion from the Football League Fourth Division in 1978–79, although they were relegated after only one season in the Third Division. They were well on course for an immediate return to the Third Division when in February 1981 an offer came for Gradi to manage struggling First Division side Crystal Palace. Palace chairman Ron Noades had only recently left Wimbledon himself and saw Gradi as the ideal man to save his new purchase from relegation.

=== Crystal Palace ===
Gradi's time at Selhurst Park was not a success, as he failed to save Crystal Palace from relegation, and he resigned the following November after a disappointing start to the 1981–82 season.

=== Crewe Alexandra ===
After a spell coaching at Leyton Orient, Gradi returned to management on 9 June 1983, when he accepted an offer to manage Crewe Alexandra, a team who regularly finished near the bottom of the Fourth Division and had been forced to apply for re-election on several occasions in order to avoid slipping into the Northern Premier League and, since its creation in 1979, the Football Conference. His first season signings included Mark Leonard from Tranmere Rovers, John Crabbe from Hereford United and David Pullar from Exeter City as Gradi looked to build an academy structure to develop players that could be sold to help fund the player development programme. Among his first transfer successes were Dave Waller (sold to Shrewsbury Town), Gary Blissett (sold to Brentford) and Geoff Thomas (sold to Crystal Palace); gradually the club moved forward.

In 1988–89, after six seasons of steady progress, they won promotion to end 25 years in the league's basement division. Gradi signed a then unheard-of ten-year contract with Crewe. They went back down again two years later, but in 1994 won promotion to Division Two and three years after that they reached Division One for the first time in their history.

Shortly after the 1994 promotion, Gradi became the League's longest-serving manager. By 2002 he was one of just two managers, the other being Alex Ferguson, to have held their position since before 1990. He later joined the club's Board of Directors.

Gradi's contract with Crewe was one of the most controversial in the Football League; it included a clause giving him a percentage of the profit on any player sold to another club.

==== Talent spotting ====
"Dario is honest, diligent and remarkable. He did a great job at Crewe and proved himself to be one of our best managers."

— Sir Bobby Robson

His keen eye for spotting and rearing young talent is what has gained him some recognition in football. He entered into discussions with Portugal's Benfica over the vacant managerial spot in the 1980s, and was linked with the post of FA Technical Director in 1996.

During the 1980s and 1990s Gradi helped launch the careers of many players who went on to play top division and international football. These include David Platt, Rob Jones, Geoff Thomas, Danny Murphy, Ashley Ward, Wayne Collins, Seth Johnson, Robbie Savage and Neil Lennon. Gradi's success continued into the 2000s, when he helped players including Rob Hulse, Dean Ashton, David Vaughan, Michael O'Connor, Billy Jones, Nicky Maynard and Ashley Westwood.

Crewe Alexandra won the PFA Bobby Moore Fair Play trophy 12 times in 15 years during Gradi's reign.

==== End of managerial career ====
On 20 April 2007, Gradi announced that with effect from 1 July he would relinquish first-team responsibilities, becoming technical director while gradually handing over to new first-team coach Steve Holland, with Neil Baker remaining as assistant manager. Gradi was then the longest serving manager of an English Football League club. Gradi told the club website:

I didn't want to be a 75-year-old manager working seven days a week, 52 weeks a year. That is not healthy for the future of the club. I will probably drop dead doing the job at some point but I wanted to put that day off a bit. This is a better way to do things, to introduce this gradual transition because it will take some of the workload off me.

On 18 November 2008, Gradi resumed control of Crewe's first team on a caretaker basis after a poor start to the 2008–09 season under Steve Holland had left the club bottom of League One. He was in charge for just over a month before Gudjon Thordarson was announced as his successor on Christmas Eve 2008. Gradi remained in charge of the team for two games during the Christmas period, with Thordarson taking over on 29 December. Following the sacking of Thordarson on 2 October 2009, Gradi was again reinstated as caretaker manager which the board of directors then stated would be until further notice.

After returning as manager in 2009, on 10 November 2011 it was announced that Gradi had chosen to step down as manager, returning to his position as Director of Football. Gradi's assistant manager Steve Davis, who had played for Crewe under Gradi from 1983 to 1987, was appointed as manager with immediate effect.

Gradi announced his retirement from all positions at Crewe Alexandra on 7 October 2019, at the age of 78, ending his 36-year association with the club.

== Honours and tributes ==
In January 1998, Gradi was awarded an MBE for services to football, but was stripped of the award in 2023. In 2003 he was made an Honorary Freeman of the Borough of Crewe and Nantwich and in the same year was awarded an honorary doctorate by Loughborough University.

In 2004, Gradi won the PFA Merit Award and was inducted into the English Football Hall of Fame for his services to football. In 2011 at the Football League Awards Gradi was again honoured by his peers as he won the 'Outstanding Contribution to League Football' for his work at Crewe. A street in Crewe, Dario Gradi Drive, is named in his honour. The winning school in the Surrey Schools Football Association's boys under-13s competition receive the Dario Gradi Trophy.

== Alleged involvement in UK football sexual abuse scandal ==
On 16 November 2016, former Crewe defender Andy Woodward revealed that he had been the victim of child sexual abuse at the club in the 1980s by former coach Barry Bennell, who was convicted in 1998. Subsequently, six other individuals contacted the police, and on 22 November, The Guardian reported that Crewe teammate Steve Walters had been another of Bennell's victims. As Gradi had been manager at the time of the abuse, and as one attack was reported to have taken place at Gradi's home but without his knowledge, Gradi was pressed to say more about what he knew, and when. On 24 November, Gradi released a statement saying he knew nothing of Bennell's crimes:

I would like to express sympathy to the victims of Barry Bennell not only at Crewe Alexandra, but at other clubs in the North West. The first I knew of Barry Bennell's crimes was when he was arrested in the United States in 1994. I knew nothing of his crimes before this time when he was employed by us. No-one at the Football Club knew of Bennell's crimes until his arrest in 1994 and his subsequent prosecution in the United Kingdom. The football club also co-operated fully with the authorities in 2003. The club are in the process of a review and I won't be making any further comment until this is finalised."

Also on 24 November, another ex-Crewe academy graduate Danny Murphy talked to the Evening Standard about Gradi:

He was an amazing, generous, caring guy but he would never cross boundaries. I felt comfortable in his company. I felt safe in his home and under his guardianship. The more time I spent at Crewe, I notice the caution he exercised within his role. ... For example, he wouldn't come into the bedroom to wake you up but he would always shout through the door. ... I hate the fact that he might be doubted in any way or even remotely linked to such negativity and bad things. My experience is totally the opposite. ... I believe that if he had known what Barry Bennell had been doing, he would have put a stop to it.

Similar character references were provided by former Crewe trainee, later Crewe Chronicle and Cheshire Live journalist, Peter Morse, and former defender David Wright.

On 3 December, The Independent reported an allegation from a former Chelsea youth player (later named as Eamonn Manners) that Gradi, then Chelsea's assistant manager, visited the player's family's home to "smooth over" a complaint of sexual assault against Chelsea chief scout Eddie Heath in 1974. Gradi responded with a statement:

Aside from denying any wrongdoing, it would be inappropriate and unfair on all parties to comment piecemeal through the media at this time in connection with historic allegations. Suffice to say, I will do everything within my power to assist all investigatory authorities into what is becoming a wide-ranging and important enquiry into historic sexual abuse.

On 6 December 2016, the Football Association announced the terms of reference of a review to be conducted by Clive Sheldon QC, and said Gradi would be among the first to be asked questions over the "smoothing over" allegation. In connection with these allegations, on 11 December 2016, the FA announced that it had suspended Gradi. Gradi subsequently said he had been notified by the FA of his interim suspension from football on 25 November, and reiterated "that I will do everything within my power to assist all investigatory authorities."

On 7 December, the BBC reported that the mother of a former Crewe youth team player wrote an anonymous letter to Gradi in 1989–90, asking him to investigate "inappropriate" behaviour whereby a member of staff "took lots of boys into his room overnight" during a weekend away in Blackpool.

In February 2017, it was reported that Gradi planned to appeal against his FA suspension from football, feeling he had been left "in limbo", but, a year later, he remained suspended from football. On 27 February 2018, claims were made that, in 2001, a former Crewe Alexandra employee was asked by a senior official at the club to help wipe pornography off Gradi's home computer, which had been viewed by a group of Irish under-13 players at his house.

In February 2019, The Guardian reported on a nine-page statement from Gradi about what he knew regarding Barry Bennell. Gradi admitted to encouraging a close player-coach culture and to not making detailed background checks about Bennell because Crewe was trying to poach him from Manchester City "on the quiet". Club chairman John Bowler said Crewe had not appreciated the dangers of football being used as a means for a paedophile to prey on young boys ("documented procedures that are now in place for the protection of minors were not in place at that time"), while Gradi had not made detailed inquiries into Bennell's background ("He did not have any specific coaching qualifications but none were required and at the time the FA did not publish any guidance on child protection"). However, former club secretary Gill Palin had been uncomfortable about Bennell.

In August 2019, Chelsea's board apologised "unreservedly" for allowing Eddie Heath, a "prolific and manipulative sexual abuser", to operate "unchallenged". Its inquiry, led by barrister Charles Geekie QC, was also critical of former assistant manager Gradi. He was accused of failing to tell senior club staff about a sexual conduct allegation concerning Heath made by the parent of a young player. Gradi denied trying to "smooth over" the matter in a meeting with the boy's father and said he had reported the allegations to Chelsea manager Ron Suart. Gradi was accused by Geekie of giving "somewhat unlikely and unconvincing" evidence; Geekie also rejected Gradi's claim to have reported the matter to more senior staff, saying "this was a significant personal failure by Mr Gradi. It was a lost opportunity to expose Mr Heath and prevent further abuse."

The FA's 700-page Sheldon report was published on 17 March 2021, identifying failures to act adequately on complaints or rumours of sexual abuse at eight professional clubs including Crewe. Considering whether senior club people knew about Bennell, Sheldon concluded they had not received specific reports of abuse (a conclusion also reached by Cheshire constabulary). However, Norman Rowlinson, John Bowler and Hamilton Smith had discussed concerns about inappropriate behaviour; "... during Bennell's time at the Club, there were rumours circulating about [Bennell] and his sexual interest in children which were heard by some of the Club's staff, including Dario Gradi." The club "should have done more to check on the well-being of the boys", Sheldon said. Regarding the Chelsea allegations, Sheldon could not decide whether Gradi had informed the club's acting manager, Ron Suart, of concerns raised at a meeting with the player's father, but, either way, Sheldon said Gradi's or Suart's responses were inadequate. The FA's CEO Mark Bullingham said Gradi was "effectively banned for life" from football; the FA legal director said it was "for safeguarding reasons" but that was "as far as we can go". Child abuse survivors charity The Offside Trust called for Gradi to be stripped of his MBE, and for the Professional Footballers' Association and Football Hall of Fame to revoke other honours. Gradi was stripped of his MBE in August 2023, following a professional disbarment.

On 19 March 2021, Gradi apologised, saying: "I wish to express my deepest sympathy for the survivors and their families. I sincerely and personally regret that the harm being caused to these young people was not discovered at the time. I apologise for not recognising any signs of abuse at the time." He also asserted that he had not been banned from all football-related activity – "this is not the case" he said. "I am suspended indefinitely from certain specified activities with players under the age of 18 years and whilst I do not agree with it, I understand how the decision was arrived at."

== Managerial statistics ==
Managerial record by team and tenure
Team	From	To	Record					Ref
Team	From	To	P	W	D	L	Win %	Ref
Wimbledon	5 January 1978	1 January 1981	171	63	47	61	36.8	
Crystal Palace	1 February 1981	10 November 1981	27	6	3	18	22.2	
Crewe Alexandra	1 June 1983	21 September 2003^{1}	1,053	411	251	391	39.0	
Crewe Alexandra	18 October 2003	1 July 2007	188	53	50	85	28.2	
Crewe Alexandra	18 November 2008	29 December 2008	8	3	1	4	37.5	
Crewe Alexandra	12 October 2009	13 November 2011	110	38	23	49	34.5	
Crewe Alexandra	Crewe total		1,359	505	325	529	37.2	—
Total			1,557	574	375	608	36.9	—

^{1}Gradi was absent from his post between 22 September and 17 October 2003, because of heart surgery. Assistant manager Neil Baker took charge of the team for this period (P6, W0, D1, L5).

== Honours ==
Crewe Alexandra

- Football League Second Division play-offs: 1997

Individual

- Football League Two Manager of the Month: January 2011

== See also ==
- List of longest managerial reigns in association football
- List of football managers with the most matches
