= Norman Rowlinson =

- Born: June 1923
- Died: 18 August 2006

Norman Rowlinson (June 1923 – 18 August 2006) was an English businessman and chairman of Crewe Alexandra from 1964 to 1988, (Note: Different sources give varying dates (some suggest 1987), however records at Companies House show Rowlinson was chairman in May 1988; Bowler had become chairman by the time the following years accounts were signed in May 1989.) credited with keeping the club afloat during its toughest financial times.

A director of a timber business, he joined Crewe as a director in 1962, and became chairman in 1964. Crewe achieved promotion from the Fourth Division on two occasions during the 1960s, but initially unable to establish themselves at the higher level. In 1963, Crewe secured their first promotion to the Third Division, finishing in third place, but were relegated back to Division Four the following season. Managed by Ernie Tagg, the club achieved promotion for a second time in 1967–68, but again spent just one season in the Third Division. From 1969, Crewe spent 20 years in Division Four, finishing bottom in 1971–72, 1978–79 and 1981–82.

Rowlinson appointed Tony Waddington as manager in 1978. Popular with fans, Waddington failed to achieve promotion in 1981 and was sacked by Rowlinson.

In June 1983, after Crewe finished second from bottom at the end of the 1982–83 season, Rowlinson appointed Milan-born Dario Gradi as manager. Gradi looked to build an academy structure to develop players that could be sold to help fund the player development programme. Among his early transfer successes were Geoff Thomas and John Pemberton (both signed from Rochdale and sold to Crystal Palace, in 1987 and 1988 respectively), and former Manchester United apprentice David Platt, signed in 1985 and sold to Aston Villa for £200,000 in February 1988. Gradi remained as manager for 24 years, helping improve Crewe's fortunes through the 1980s. In 1989 they achieved promotion to the Third Division by finishing third in the Fourth Division, ending 20 years of bottom division football. They remained in the Third Division for two years before being relegated again. Crewe were then promoted again in 1994 after a final day victory at Chester City. Crewe then twice lost in play-off semi-finals, to Bristol Rovers in 1995 and Notts County in 1996, before returning to Wembley in the 1997 Division Two play-off final, securing a 1–0 victory over Brentford to put the club back in the second tier for the first time since 1896.

Rowlinson retired as chairman in 1988 when he handed over the reins to John Bowler, although he remained at the club as a director and president.

Rowlinson, who lived at Worleston near Nantwich, died of cancer in August 2006 at the age of 83. He had been on the club's board for 44 years (24 of them as chairman). His son Jimmy inherited his 24.28% stake in the club.

In November 2016, Rowlinson's time as chairman was recalled during the early stages of the United Kingdom football sexual abuse scandal as newspapers reported on Crewe's initial management of allegations that Barry Bennell had sexually abused a junior footballer in the late 1980s. Bennell was allowed to stay at the club despite Rowlinson's recommendation that the club "get him out"; Rowlinson had sought police advice about Bennell and had been advised to "move him on". The Football Association's Sheldon Report, published in March 2021, identified failures to act adequately at clubs including Crewe. While Sheldon concluded senior Crewe people—Rowlinson, Bowler and other directors—had not received specific reports of abuse (a conclusion also reached by Cheshire constabulary), they had discussed concerns about inappropriate behaviour; the club "should have done more to check on the well-being of the boys", Sheldon said.

== Notes and references ==
=== Sources ===
- Crisp, Marco (1998). Crewe Alexandra Match by Match (2nd ed.). Nottingham: Tony Brown. ISBN 1-899468-81-1.
- Hornbrook, Jules (2000). The Gradi Years. Crewe. ISBN 0953887707.
