= Derek Bell (footballer, born 1963) =

English footballer

Personal information
- Full name: Derek Stewart Bell
- Date of birth: 19 December 1963 (age 62)
- Place of birth: Newcastle-upon-Tyne, England
- Position: Midfielder

Youth career
- –1981: Newcastle United

Senior career*
| Years | Team | Apps | (Gls) |
| 1981–1984 | Newcastle United | 4 | (0) |
| 1984–1985 | Newcastle Blue Star | | |
| 1985–1988 | Gateshead | | |
| 1988–1989 | North Shields | | |
| 1989–1991 | Gateshead | | |
| 1991–1992 | Bridlington Town | | |
| 1992–1994 | Bishop Auckland | | |
| 1994–1995 | Berwick Rangers | 2 | (0) |
| 1995–199? | Whitley Bay | | |

Managerial career
- 1995–199?: Whitley Bay (player-manager)
- 2002–2004: Gateshead
- * Club domestic league appearances and goals

Derek Stewart Bell (born 19 December 1963) is a former professional footballer who played for Newcastle United and, later as a semi-professional, for Gateshead, as a midfielder.

Bell joined Newcastle as an apprentice in 1979, and made four first team appearances (one as a substitute). He sustained a serious knee injury in a reserve match against Manchester United, and, after leaving Newcastle, he played semi‑professional football for Gateshead, while working in Newcastle City Council's housing department. Bell was also manager, director and chairman at Gateshead.

During his time at the Montagu and North Fenham boys football club in the late 1970s, Bell was sexually abused by Newcastle coach George Ormond. When Bell was working with finding homes for refugee children in the late 1990s and saw Ormond lurking, he decided to secretly record a confession from the coach. Bell was among seven former players at Montagu and North Fenham who gave evidence in a 2002 trial of Ormond that led to his conviction on 13 indecency charges. In November 2016, amid the United Kingdom football sexual abuse scandal, Bell waived his right to anonymity and accused Newcastle of attempting a cover-up.

Bell left his council job after he was made to find new homes for paedophiles. He suffered from alcohol abuse, had three divorces and attempted suicide three times. He was convicted in 2009 of violence against his wife. He was diagnosed with post-traumatic stress disorder and borderline personality disorder.
