= Anthony Hughes (footballer) =

English footballer

Personal information
- Date of birth: 3 October 1973 (age 53)
- Place of birth: Liverpool, England
- Position: Central defender

Senior career*
Years	Team	Apps	(Gls)
1992–1994	Crewe Alexandra	23	(1)
1994	→ Bærum		
1994–1998	Morecambe		
- Winsford United

International career
- England u-20
- * Club domestic league appearances and goals

Anthony Hughes (born 3 October 1973) is an English former professional footballer who played as a central defender.

== Career ==
Hughes began his career with Crewe Alexandra, where he made 23 appearances in the Football League. He made his debut against Torquay United on 15 August 1992, and scored his first (and only) league goal for Crewe against Carlisle United on 6 April 1993, both at Gresty Road.

In 1994 Hughes briefly went on loan to Norwegian second-tier club Bærum SK. Hughes later played non-league football for four seasons at Morecambe, and playing for Winsford United before quitting the game, aged 29.

Hughes also participated at the 1993 FIFA World Youth Championship, making six appearances for England as they finished third in the tournament, held in Australia.

On 27 November 2016, Hughes revealed that he had been abused by former Crewe Alexandra coach Barry Bennell, a core figure in the United Kingdom football sexual abuse scandal.
