= Mark Williams (footballer, born 1970) =

Footballer (born 1970)

Personal information
- Full name: Mark Stuart Williams
- Date of birth: 28 September 1970 (age 56)
- Place of birth: Stalybridge, England
- Position: Defender

Senior career*
Years	Team	Apps	(Gls)
1991–1992	Newtown		
1992–1995	Shrewsbury Town	99	(3)
1995–1999	Chesterfield	168	(12)
1999–2000	Watford	22	(1)
2000–2002	Wimbledon	70	(7)
2002–2003	Stoke City	6	(0)
2003	Columbus Crew	5	(0)
2004	Wimbledon	11	(1)
2004–2005	Milton Keynes Dons	13	(0)
2004–2005	→ Rushden & Diamonds (loan)	7	(0)
Total		401	(24)

International career
1999–2005	Northern Ireland	36	(1)
- * Club domestic league appearances and goals

Mark Stuart Williams (born 28 September 1970) is a former professional footballer who played as a defender for Shrewsbury Town, Chesterfield, Watford, Wimbledon, Stoke City, Milton Keynes Dons and Rushden & Diamonds.

Born in England, Williams played international football for Northern Ireland, being selected 36 times.

== Club career ==
Williams started his career at Newtown, then moved to Shrewsbury Town where in 1993–94 season he helped the side win the Third Division title. After three seasons with the Shrews he moved to Chesterfield. In the 1996–97 season, he was part of Chesterfield's historic run to the FA Cup semi final, playing in both the semi-final and semi final replay against Middlesbrough. Williams had earlier kick started their memorable cup run when he scored the only goal in the first round against Bury.

In 1999, he was signed by newly promoted Premier League side Watford. He scored once for Watford, his goal coming in a 2–1 defeat to Leeds United. However, at the end of the season the Hornets were relegated outright, in bottom place with just 24 points and Williams moved to another relegated side Wimbledon. Although an integral part of the team in his first season, he lost his place and joined Stoke City in March 2003. Stoke were in deep relegation trouble in 2002–03 and Williams played in six matches helping them to avoid the drop on the final day of the season. In the summer of 2003 he moved to the United States to play for Major League Soccer team Columbus Crew where he made five appearances before returning to England.

Williams re-joined old club Wimbledon in February 2004 and played 11 times for the club in 2003–04 as they suffered relegation to League One. He stayed at the club following their controversial change to Milton Keynes Dons and played 15 times for the club before ending his career with seven games on loan at Rushden & Diamonds.

== International career ==
Williams played for Northern Ireland between 1999 and 2005 and won 36 caps, scoring once.

== Personal life ==
In 2006, Williams married glamour model and pornographic actress Linsey Dawn McKenzie. The couple have one child, Luca Scott Mark Williams, born on 16 May 2005. Mark also has a daughter Chardae from a previous relationship.

In November 2016, amid the United Kingdom football sexual abuse scandal, Williams waived his right to anonymity and alleged he had been abused by youth coach Barry Bennell while a trainee at Crewe. In Manchester on 5 December 2016, Williams was one of five abuse victims at the launch of an organisation, the Offside Trust, to support player victims of abuse and their families.

== Career statistics ==
=== Club ===
Appearances and goals by club, season and competition
Club	Season	League			National cup		League cup		Other (Note: Includes Football League Trophy.)		Total	
Club	Season	Division	Apps	Goals	Apps	Goals	Apps	Goals	Apps	Goals	Apps	Goals
Shrewsbury Town	1992–93	Third Division	28	1	2	0	1	0	1	0	32	1
Shrewsbury Town	1993–94	Third Division	36	1	3	0	5	0	2	0	46	1
Shrewsbury Town	1994–95	Second Division	35	1	1	0	2	0	3	1	41	2
Shrewsbury Town	Total		99	3	6	0	8	0	6	1	119	4
Chesterfield	1995–96	Second Division	42	3	2	0	1	0	5	0	50	3
Chesterfield	1996–97	Second Division	42	3	7	1	2	0	0	0	51	4
Chesterfield	1997–98	Second Division	44	3	3	0	4	0	1	0	52	3
Chesterfield	1998–99	Second Division	40	3	1	0	3	0	1	1	45	4
Chesterfield	Total		168	12	13	1	10	0	7	1	191	14
Watford	1999–2000	Premier League	22	1	2	0	2	0	0	0	26	1
Wimbledon	2000–01	First Division	42	6	6	1	4	0	0	0	52	7
Wimbledon	2001–02	First Division	5	0	0	0	1	1	0	0	6	1
Wimbledon	2002–03	First Division	23	1	2	0	0	0	0	0	25	1
Wimbledon	Total		70	7	8	1	5	1	0	0	83	9
Stoke City	2002–03	First Division	6	0	0	0	0	0	0	0	6	0
Columbus Crew	2003	Major League Soccer	5	0	0	0	0	0	0	0	5	0
Wimbledon	2003–04	First Division	11	1	0	0	0	0	0	0	11	1
Milton Keynes Dons	2004–05	League One	13	0	0	0	1	0	1	0	15	0
Rushden & Diamonds (loan)	2004–05	League Two	7	0	0	0	0	0	0	0	7	0
Career total			401	24	29	2	26	1	14	2	470	29

=== International ===
Appearances and goals by national team and year
National team	Year	Apps	Goals
Northern Ireland	1999	8	0
Northern Ireland	2000	5	0
Northern Ireland	2001	4	1
Northern Ireland	2002	3	0
Northern Ireland	2003	5	0
Northern Ireland	2004	10	0
Northern Ireland	2005	1	0
Total		36	1

== Honours ==
Shrewsbury Town

- Football League Third Division: 1993–94
