= Clive Sheldon =

Judge and author of 2019 report into abuse in the Football Association

Sir Clive Sheldon
- Royal coat of arms of the United Kingdom

Justice of the High Court
- Incumbent
- Assumed office 1 February 2024

Personal details
- Born: 13 October 1966 (age 59)
- Education: Gonville and Caius College, Cambridge; University of Pennsylvania

Sir Clive David Sheldon (born 13 October 1966) is a judge of the High Court of England and Wales.

He was educated at The Latymer School, Gonville and Caius College, Cambridge (BA, 1989) and the University of Pennsylvania (LLM). He was called to the Bar at Inner Temple in 1991. He was a barrister at 11 King's Bench Walk Chambers from 1995 to 2024, becoming a QC in 2011, and a judge of the High Court of Justice (King's Bench Division) in 2024.

Sheldon conducted an enquiry, commissioned by The Football Association, into the United Kingdom football sexual abuse scandal, producing a report dubbed the "Sheldon report" in March 2021.
