= Steve Walters (footballer) =

English footballer

Personal information
- Date of birth: 9 January 1972 (age 54)
- Place of birth: Plymouth, England
- Position: Midfielder

Youth career
- Crewe Alexandra

Senior career*
Years	Team	Apps	(Gls)
1989–1995	Crewe Alexandra	146	(10)
1995–2000	Northwich Victoria	177	(35)
2000–2001	Morecambe	22	(1)
2001	Stevenage Borough	17	(2)
2001–2002	Kidsgrove Athletic	48	(62)
2002–2004	Rhyl	56	(8)
2005–2011	Rhos Aelwyd	??	(??)

Managerial career
- 2007–2011: Rhos Aelwyd
- * Club domestic league appearances and goals

Steve Walters (born 9 January 1972) is an English former footballer who played in the Football League for Crewe Alexandra and in the Football Conference for Northwich Victoria, Morecambe and Stevenage Borough. He was a midfielder.

== Football career ==
Born in Plymouth, Devon, Walters first came to attention in 1984 when he won a competition at Butlin's Minehead for which the prize was the opportunity to train with Manchester United, and was then spotted by the coach Barry Bennell. He was a member of The Football Association's centre of excellence at Lilleshall Hall in the same class as future England internationals Andy Cole and Ian Walker, and chose to start his career at Crewe Alexandra due to their reputation for developing young talent. He made his first team debut at 16 years and 119 days on 7 May 1988 against Peterborough United. His first Crewe goal was scored against Hartlepool United at Gresty Road on 4 March 1989. Through the early part of the 1990s he built up 173 appearances for the club over all competitions, scoring eleven goals, and appeared in the 1993 Football League Third Division play-off final, which Crewe lost on penalties to York City, though they gained automatic promotion a year later.

At the age of 17, Walters was diagnosed with reactive arthritis, which worsened until he could no longer play professionally. Walters was unsure whether this condition was sexually transmitted.

He dropped out of league football in 1995 to join Football Conference side Northwich Victoria. After five years with Victoria he signed with Morecambe, where he spent one season. In 2001, Walters moved to Stevenage Borough, and then on to Kidsgrove Athletic.

In 2002, Walters joined Rhyl of the Welsh Premier League. In 2003–04, the club won the league, the Welsh Cup, the Welsh League Cup and reached the final of the FAW Premier Cup. He was named in the league's Team of the Year.

He then managed Rhos Aelwyd, where he was appointed manager in 2007. In 2007–08, the team won the FAW Trophy, and a year later the Welsh National League Premier Division Cup; in 2009–10 the club won the Welsh National League and promotion into the Cymru Alliance. He was named manager of the season for their first campaign back in the second tier. In August 2011 he moved into the coaching staff at Buckley Town. He was appointed under-19 coach at Airbus UK Broughton in October 2012.

=== Child sexual abuse survivor ===
On 16 November 2016, former Crewe defender Andy Woodward revealed that he had been a victim of child sexual abuse by former football coach Barry Bennell (convicted as a paedophile in 1998) at the club in the 1980s. Subsequently, other victims contacted the police, and on 22 November, The Guardian reported that Walters had been another of Bennell's victims. In Manchester on 5 December 2016, Walters was one of five abuse victims at the launch of an organisation, the Offside Trust, to support player victims of abuse and their families. With Woodward (until he resigned on 27 January 2017) and Chris Unsworth, Walters was one of the Trust's directors.

In early 2017, Walters (who now runs a cleaning company) repeatedly bemoaned the lack of support expressed by current professional players to abuse victims, describing it as a "deafening silence" and "shocking and hurtful". It was also reported he had been on a course of counselling at the Priory provided by the Professional Footballers' Association.

Walters had been interviewed several times by police in 1994 after Bennell's initial conviction for child sexual abuse in the United States, but denied that he had been abused, fearing that he would lose his career as a result.

On 28 February 2019, Steve Walters accused Crewe of showing "no humanity" and "victim blaming" in a bid to avoid compensation payouts, and of claiming he had waited too long to report abuse. The club said Walters's claims included (unspecified) "fundamental inaccuracies".

== Honours ==
Crewe Alexandra

- Football League Fourth Division third-place promotion winner: 1988–89

Rhyl

- Welsh Premier League: 2003–04
- Welsh Cup: 2003–04
- Welsh League Cup: 2003–04
- FAW Premier Cup: runner-up 2003–04

Rhos Aelwyd

- FAW Trophy: 2007–08
- Welsh National League Premier Division Cup: 2008–09
- Welsh National League: 2009–10

Individual

- Welsh Premier League Team of the Year: 2003–04
- Cymru Alliance Manager of the Season: 2010–11
