= Crewe Town Council =

UK local authority for the town of Crewe, Cheshire, England

- Logo

Type
- Type: Town Council

History
- Founded: 2013; 13 years ago

Leadership
- Leader: Jill Rhodes
- Mayor: Tom Dunlop
- Town Clerk: Pete Turner

Structure
- Seats: 20 councillors
- Labour: 18 / 20
- Conservative: 1 / 20
- Independent: 1 / 20

Elections
- Last election: 4 May 2023
- Next election: 2 May 2027

Website
- www.crewetowncouncil.gov.uk//

Crewe Town Council is a parish council covering the town of Crewe in Cheshire, England. It comprises six wards, electing 20 councillors between them. The Council is based at 1 Chantry Court, Crewe where it generally holds its committee meetings. Full Council meetings are normally held at the Salvation Army.

The first elections were held on 4 April 2013, and resulted in the Labour Party winning all 20 seats on the council, this was repeated in the 2015 and 2019 local elections.

== History ==
Ward & Map (Link)	Seats
Crewe St Barnabas (Map)	2
Crewe Central (Map)	2
Crewe North (Map)	2
Crewe South (Map)	4 except for Gresty Brook (polling district 1GM2)
Crewe East (Map)	6
Crewe West (Map)	4

=== 2013 Election ===
The first election for the newly established Crewe Town Council took place on 4 April 2013. The results were:

Crewe Central Ward
Party	Candidate	Votes	%
Labour	Tony Davison	290	
Labour	Irene Faseyi	288	
Conservative	Frank Zbyszek Lepisz	43	
UKIP	James Clutton	126	
Majority			
Turnout			
Labour win (new seat)			
Labour win (new seat)			

Crewe East Ward
Party	Candidate	Votes	%
Labour	Damian Bailey	1,133	
Labour	Joy Bratherton	1,181	
Labour	Suzanne Brookfield	1,124	
Labour	Kevin Hickson	999	
Labour	Margaret Martin	1,191	
Labour	Benn Minshall	1,020	
Conservative	Peter Hargreaves	321	
Conservative	Irene Hayes	376	
Conservative	Colin Todd	283	
Liberal Democrats	Nick Taylor	254	
UKIP	Lawrence Leat	714	
Independent	Richard Ford	431	
Majority			
Turnout			
Labour win (new seat)			
Labour win (new seat)			
Labour win (new seat)			
Labour win (new seat)			
Labour win (new seat)			
Labour win (new seat)			

Crewe North Ward
Party	Candidate	Votes	%	±%
Labour	Terry Beard	345		
Labour	Christine Bratheron	293		
Conservative	Derek Bebbington	134		
Conservative	Christopher Waling	67		
UKIP	Richard Lee	246		
Independent	Darryl Clews	122		
Majority				
Turnout				
Labour win (new seat)				
Labour win (new seat)				

Crewe South Ward
Party	Candidate	Votes	%	±%
Labour	Igor Appilat	606		
Labour	Mary Carline	686		
Labour	Jill Rhodes	673		
Labour	Simon Yates	629		
Conservative	Jubeyar Ahmed	207		
Conservative	Thomas Ankers	179		
Conservative	Barbara Densem	177		
Conservative	Linda Gill	167		
Liberal Democrats	Robert Icke	187		
Liberal Democrats	Rebecca Macfadyen	146		
UKIP	James Walklate	289		
Majority				
Turnout				
Labour win (new seat)				
Labour win (new seat)				
Labour win (new seat)				
Labour win (new seat)				

St. Barnabas Ward
Party	Candidate	Votes	%	±%
Labour	Joe Lundie	251		
Labour	Christine Cull	307		
Conservative	Daniel Bull	94		
UKIP	Simon Walklate	163		
Majority				
Labour win (new seat)				
Labour win (new seat)				

Crewe West Ward
Party	Candidate	Votes	%	±%
Labour	Dawn Kay	663		
Labour	Stuart Kay	649		
Labour	Mike Russan	660		
Labour	Nanette Walton	594		
Conservative	Jonathan Sutton	205		
Conservative	Steven Edgar	192		
Conservative	Jacquie Weatherill	264		
Conservative	Max Tebbits	148		
Liberal Democrats	David Cannon	203		
UKIP	Robert Handford	378		
Turnout				
Majority				
Labour win (new seat)				
Labour win (new seat)				
Labour win (new seat)				
Labour win (new seat)				
