= List of Crewe Alexandra F.C. records and statistics =

This article details Crewe Alexandra F.C. records since the club's establishment in 1877.

== Honours and achievements ==
In 102 completed seasons, Crewe Alexandra have never won a division title, and have only been division runners-up twice.

Football League Second Division (3rd tier) (Note: Upon its formation in 1992, the Premier League became the top tier of English football; the Football League First, Second and Third Divisions then became the second, third and fourth tiers, respectively. From 2004, the First Division became the Championship, the Second Division became League One and the Third Division became League Two.)

- 2nd place promotion: 2002–03
- Play-off winners: 1997

Football League Fourth Division / League Two (4th tier)

- 2nd place promotion: 2019–20
- 3rd place promotion: 1962–63, 1993–94
- 4th place promotion: 1967–68, 1988–89
- Play-off winners: 2012

Football League Trophy

- Winners: 2013

Welsh Cup

- Winners: 1936, 1937

Cheshire Senior Cup

- Winners: (16) - 1887, 1888, 1892, 1893, 1899, 1900, 1901, 1907, 1910, 1912, 1913, 1923, 2002, 2003, 2017, 2026

Cheshire Premier Cup

- Winners: 2009, 2010

Milk Cup

- Premier Section Winners: 1987, 1999
- Junior Section Winners: 1990, 1998

== Club records ==
=== Football League record ===
Including the 2026–2027 season, Crewe Alexandra has played in 104 Football League seasons. The club has never played in the top flight, and has played only 12 seasons in the second tier (including four, from 1892 to 1896, when there were only two divisions); 48 seasons have been in the third tier (30 when there were only three tiers), and 42 in the fourth tier. In total, Crewe has played in the bottom division of the Football League in 78 out of 103 seasons.

Chart of table positions of Crewe Alexandra in the Football League.

| Years | Seasons | Tier | Division |
|---|---|---|---|
| 1892 – 1896 | 4 | 2nd | Division Two (Best finishing position: 10th of 12 teams, in 1892–93) |
| 1921 – 1958 | 31 | 3rd | Division Three (North) |
| 1958 – 1963 | 5 | 4th | Division Four |
| 1963 – 1964 | 1 | 3rd | Division Three |
| 1964 – 1968 | 4 | 4th | Division Four |
| 1968 – 1969 | 1 | 3rd | Division Three |
| 1969 – 1989 | 20 | 4th | Division Four |
| 1989 – 1991 | 2 | 3rd | Division Three |
| 1991 – 1992 | 1 | 4th | Division Four |
| 1992 – 1994 | 2 | 4th | Division Three |
| 1994 – 1997 | 3 | 3rd | Division Two |
| 1997 – 2002 | 5 | 2nd | Division One (Highest League finishing position: 11th of 24 teams, in 1997–98) |
| 2002 – 2003 | 1 | 3rd | Division Two |
| 2003 – 2006 | 3 | 2nd | Division One / Football League Championship (2004 onwards) |
| 2006 – 2009 | 3 | 3rd | Football League One |
| 2009 – 2012 | 3 | 4th | Football League Two |
| 2012 – 2016 | 4 | 3rd | Football League One |
| 2016 – 2020 | 4 | 4th | Football League Two |
| 2020 – 2022 | 2 | 3rd | Football League One |
| 2022 – present | 5 | 4th | Football League Two |

==== Aggregate league record from 1888–89 to 2025–26 ====
| Tier | League | Seasons | P | W | D | L | F | A | GD | Years | Notes |
|---|---|---|---|---|---|---|---|---|---|---|---|
| 2 | Championship/Division 2 | 12 | 478 | 126 | 106 | 246 | 572 | 926 | -354 | 1892–93 to 2021–22 | |
| 3 | League One/Division 3 | 17 | 782 | 262 | 180 | 340 | 971 | 1164 | -193 | 1920–21 to 2021–22 | |
| 3 | Division 3 North | 31 | 1285 | 456 | 271 | 558 | 1951 | 2250 | -299 | 1921–22 to 1957–58 | |
| 4 | League Two/Division 4 | 42 | 1913 | 679 | 492 | 742 | 2552 | 2701 | -149 | 1958–59 to 2025–26 | |
| All | | 102 | 4458 | 1523 | 1049 | 1886 | 6046 | 7041 | -995 | 1892–93 to 2025–26 | |

=== Cup records ===
(up to and including the 2024–25 season)

| Cup | Best performance | Seasons | P | W | D | L | F | A | GD | Notes |
|---|---|---|---|---|---|---|---|---|---|---|
| FA Cup | Semi-Final (1887–88, (Note: Crewe originally lost 2–3 to Swifts F.C. in the Fourth Round Replay, but the game was declared void, and replayed. Crewe won the replay 2–1.) lost to Preston North End 0–4) | 107 | 255 | 90 | 59 | 106 | 377 | 427 | -50 | |
| League Cup | 3rd Round Replay (1974–75, lost to Aston Villa 0–1) | 65 | 151 | 47 | 33 | 71 | 211 | 270 | -59 | |
| League Trophy | Champions (2012–13, won against Southend United 2–0) | 34 | 99 | 38 | 26 | 38 | 165 | 150 | 15 | |

=== Wins ===
- Biggest league win - 8–0 vs Rotherham United (Division 3 North, 1 October 1932) - six different Crewe scorers.
- Biggest cup win - 9–1 against Northwich Victoria (FA Cup, 16 November 1889)
  Eight goal margins also achieved (8-0 wins) against:
  - Hartlepool United (Auto Windscreens Shield 1st Rd, 17 October 1995) - seven different Crewe scorers (plus an own goal).
  - Doncaster Rovers (LDV Vans Trophy 3rd Rd, 10 November 2002)

=== Defeats ===
- Biggest league defeat - 1–11 vs Lincoln City (Division 3 North, 29 September 1951)
- Biggest cup defeat - 2–13 vs Tottenham Hotspur (FA Cup 4th Rd Replay, 3 February 1960)

=== Sequences ===
- Longest undefeated run in league - 19 (in 2011-12 season, 24 February 2012 to 17 May 2012 inclusive, including three play-off matches.)
- Longest undefeated run in league from start of season - 11 (in 1953–54 and 2026–27
- Longest league run without a win - 30 (22 September 1956 to 6 April 1957)
- Longest run without an away win - 56 (25 December 1954 to 24 April 1957)
- Longest run without scoring - 9 (6 November 1974)
- Longest run with goals conceded - 40 (10 April 1936)
- Longest run of home defeats - 8 (29 January to 2 April 2022)
- Longest run of away defeats - 24 (1894–95, Division 2)
- Longest run of defeats from start of season - 8 (1981–82, Division 4)

=== League points ===
Most league points in a season

- Three points for win - 86 (2002–2003, Division 2)
- Two points for win - 59 (1962–1963, Division 4 - under 'three points for win' system, total would have been 83)

Least league points in a season

- Two points for win - 10 (1894–1895, Division 2 - 16 teams; Crewe lost all 15 away games that season, and won just three home games)
- Two points for win - 21 (1956–1957, Division 3 North - 24 teams)
- Three points for win - 27 (1981–1982, Division 4 - 24 teams; tally would have been 21 under old points system)

=== Others ===
- Most goals in a season - 95 (in 40 games), 1931–32 Division 3 North
- Most clean sheets in a season - 24 (2002–2003, Clayton Ince 20 and Ademola Bankole 4)
- Most away wins in a single season - 17 (2002–2003 Division 2)

== Player records ==
=== Appearances ===
- Youngest first-team player - Joel Ewusi, 16 years 79 days (vs Barnsley, 25 August 2026)
- Oldest first-team player - Kenny Swain, 39 years 281 days (vs Maidstone United, 5 November 1991)
- Most consecutive League, FA Cup and League Cup appearances - Geoff Crudgington, 138 (between 17 August 1974 and 5 March 1977)

==== Most appearances ====
Competitive matches only, includes appearances as substitute. Numbers in brackets indicate goals scored.

| # | Name | Nation | League | FA Cup | League Cup | Football League Trophy | Watney Cup | Welsh Cup | Total |
|---|---|---|---|---|---|---|---|---|---|
| 1 | Tommy Lowry | (England) | 435 (2) | 21 (0) | 24 (0) | 0 (0) | 1 (1) | 0 (0) | 482 (3) |
| 2 | Peter Leigh | (England) | 430 (2) | 25 (0) | 17 (0) | 0 (0) | 1 (0) | 0 (0) | 473 (2) |
| 3 | Shaun Smith | (England) | 400 (40) | 21 (4) | 25 (4) | 23 (4) | 0 (0) | 0 (0) | 469 (52) |
| 4 | Kenny Lunt | (England) | 390 (35) | 17 (0) | 25 (1) | 4 (1) | 0 (0) | 0 (0) | 436 (37) |
| 5 | Eric Barnes | (England) | 350 (1) | 26 (1) | 14 (0) | 0 (0) | 0 (0) | 0 (0) | 390 (2) |
| 6 | Alan Bradshaw | (England) | 295 (50) | 15 (1) | 12 (0) | 0 (0) | 1 (0) | 0 (0) | 323 (51) |
| 7 | Steve Macauley | (England) | 270 (23) | 16 (1) | 20 (0) | 11 (3) | 0 (0) | 0 (0) | 317 (27) |
| 8 | John Meaney | (England) | 288 (38) | 19 (4) | 0 (0) | 0 (0) | 0 (0) | 0 (0) | 307 (42) |
| 9 | Byron Moore | (England) | 262 (30) | 10 (1) | 10 (1) | 15 (1) | 0 (0) | 0 (0) | 297 (33) |
| 10 | Mark Rivers | (England) | 252 (52) | 14 (4) | 18 (9) | 11 (4) | 0 (0) | 0 (0) | 295 (69) |
| 11 | Neil Sorvel | (England) | 250 (13) | 12 (0) | 17 (0) | 4 (0) | 0 (0) | 0 (0) | 283 (13) |
| 12 | Geoff Crudgington | (England) | 250 (0) | 14 (0) | 16 (0) | 0 (0) | 0 (0) | 0 (0) | 280 (0) |
| 13 | Callum Ainley | (England) | 242 (16) | 8 (1) | 8 (1) | 20 (2) | 0 (0) | 0 (0) | 278 (20) |
| 14 | Stan Keery | (England) | 253 (23) | 11 (1) | 7 (0) | 0 (0) | 0 (0) | 0 (0) | 277 (24) |
| 15 | Luke Murphy | (England) | 241 (22) | 9 (2) | 9 (0) | 13 (2) | 0 (0) | 0 (0) | 272 (26) |
| 15 | Barrie Wheatley | (England) | 240 (50) | 22 (8) | 10 (0) | 0 (0) | 0 (0) | 0 (0) | 272 (58) |
| 17 | Bert Swindells | (England) | 247 (128) | 13 (6) | 0 (0) | 0 (0) | 0 (0) | 9 (5) | 269 (139) |
| 18 | Bob Scott | (England) | 239 (16) | 6 (1) | 14 (0) | 2 (0) | 0 (0) | 0 (0) | 261 (17) |
| 19 | Bernard Purdie | (Wales) | 230 (44) | 10 (0) | 15 (0) | 0 (0) | 0 (0) | 0 (0) | 255 (44) |
| 20 | Dean Greygoose | (England) | 205 (0) | 18 (0) | 15 (0) | 13 (0) | 0 (0) | 0 (0) | 251 (0) |
| 21 | Ben Garratt | (England) | 223 (0) | 8 (0) | 6 (0) | 9 (0) | 0 (0) | 0 (0) | 246 (0) |
| 22 | Stephen Foster | (England) | 217 (15) | 11 (1) | 10 (2) | 0 (0) | 0 (0) | 0 (0) | 242 (18) |
| 23 | Mark Gardiner | (England) | 195 (34) | 15 (4) | 15 (3) | 16 (1) | 0 (0) | 0 (0) | 241 (42) |

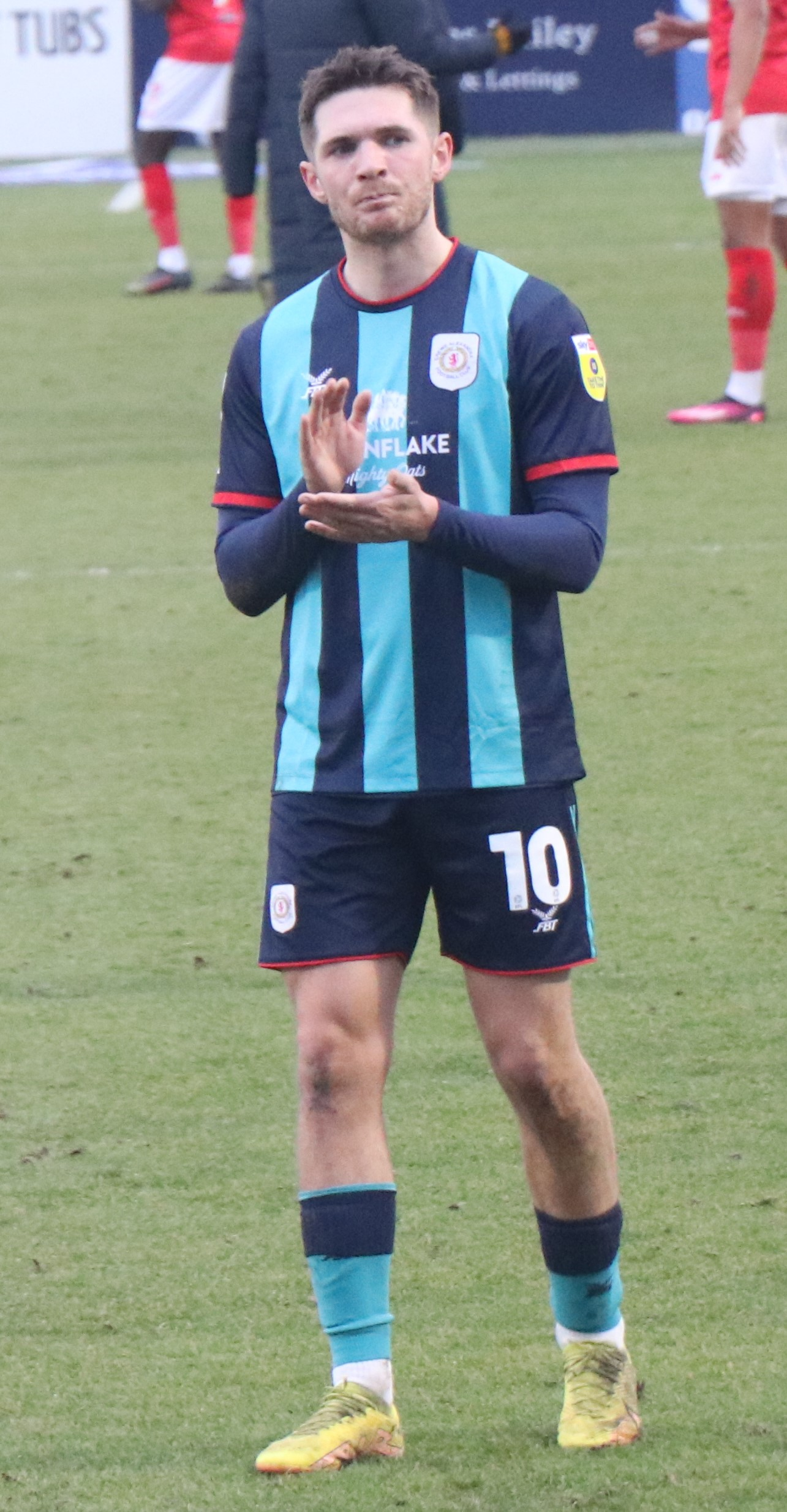
Callum Ainley, the most recent Crewe player to top 250 appearances, passed the milestone in August 2022.

Players in current squad with most appearances:

As of match played 31 October 2026

- Luke Offord - total: 188

=== Goalscorers ===
- Most goals (and most league goals) - 139 (128), Bert Swindells
- Most league goals scored in a season - 35, Terry Harkin (Div 4, 1964–65)
- Most goals in a match - 5, Tony Naylor (vs Colchester United, Div 3, 24 April 1993)
- Most hat-tricks - 8, Frank Lord
- Most hat-tricks in a season - 4, Frank Lord (1961–62)
- Most hat-tricks in a match - 3, scored by Jack Waring, Tommy Armstrong and Joe Mawson in a 9-2 defeat of Llay Welfare in the Welsh Cup on 24 February 1937.
- Youngest goalscorer - Joel Ewusi, 16 years 79 days (vs Barnsley, 25 August 2026)
- Fastest goal - 16 seconds, by Tony Naylor (vs Mansfield Town, Div 4, 13 September 1991)
- Longest goalscoring streak - 7 games: Nicky Maynard (15 March to 19 April 2008; total 11 goals, including one hat-trick)
  Five players have scored in six consecutive games:
  - Bert Llewellyn (19 September to 7 October 1959; total 11 goals, including two hat-tricks);
  - Frank Lord (12–27 April 1963; total 11 goals, including two hat-tricks);
  - Ashley Ward (12 November to 3 December 1994; total 10 goals, including two hat-tricks);
  - David Platt (31 March - 25 April 1987; total 8 goals, including one hat-trick);
  - Terry Harkin (16 January - 17 February 1965; total 7 goals).

==== Top goalscorers ====
Competitive matches only. Numbers in brackets indicate appearances made.

| # | Name | Nation | League | FA Cup | League Cup | Football League Trophy | Watney Cup | Welsh Cup | Total |
|---|---|---|---|---|---|---|---|---|---|
| 1 | Bert Swindells | (England) | 128 (247) | 6 (13) | 0 (0) | 0 (0) | 0 (0) | 5 (9) | 139 (269) |
| 2 | Dean Ashton | (England) | 61 (158) | 5 (9) | 3 (7) | 5 (3) | 0 (0) | 0 (0) | 74 (177) |
| 3 | Frank Lord | (England) | 67 (106) | 3 (8) | 3 (4) | 0 (0) | 0 (0) | 0 (0) | 73 (118) |
| 4 | Mark Rivers | (England) | 52 (152) | 4 (14) | 9 (18) | 4 (11) | 0 (0) | 0 (0) | 69 (195) |
| 5 | Jack Waring | (England) | 55 (150) | 4 (11) | 0 (0) | 0 (0) | 0 (0) | 8 (9) | 67 (170) |
| 6 | Dave Waller | (England) | 55 (170) | 0 (4) | 6 (8) | 5 (6) | 0 (0) | 0 (0) | 66 (188) |
| 7 | Jack Basford | (England) | 60 (154) | 5 (8) | 0 (0) | 0 (0) | 0 (0) | 0 (0) | 65 (154) |
| 8 | Tony Naylor | (England) | 50 (137) | 5 (11) | 5 (7) | 8 (3) | 0 (0) | 0 (0) | 63 (153) |
| 9 | David Platt | (England) | 56 (134) | 1 (3) | 4 (7) | 0 (4) | 0 (0) | 0 (0) | 61 (148) |
| 10 | Johnny King | (England) | 60 (238) | 0 (6) | 0 (6) | 0 (0) | 0 (0) | 0 (0) | 60 (238) |
| 11 | Barrie Wheatley | (England) | 50 (240) | 8 (22) | 0 (10) | 0 (0) | 0 (0) | 0 (0) | 58 (272) |
| 11 | Rob Edwards | (England) | 44 (155) | 5 (18) | 5 (8) | 4 (17) | 0 (0) | 0 (0) | 58 (198) |
| 13 | Craig Hignett | (England) | 43 (138) | 8 (12) | 4 (10) | 2 (5) | 0 (0) | 0 (0) | 57 (165) |
| 14 | Bert Llewellyn | (England) | 47 (96) | 6 (8) | 2 (2) | 4 (0) | 0 (0) | 0 (0) | 55 (106) |
| 15 | Chris Porter | (England) | 46 (168) | 4 (9) | 2 (4) | 2 (8) | 0 (0) | 0 (0) | 54 (189) |
| 16 | Shaun Miller | (England) | 48 (205) | 3 (6) | 1 (5) | 0 (9) | 0 (0) | 0 (0) | 52 (227) |
| 16 | Shaun Smith | (England) | 40 (400) | 4 (21) | 4 (25) | 4 (23) | 0 (0) | 0 (0) | 52 (469) |
| 18 | Alan Bradshaw | (England) | 50 (295) | 1 (15) | 0 (12) | 0 (0) | 0 (1) | 0 (0) | 51 (323) |
| 18 | Harry Deacon | (England) | 47 (118) | 3 (5) | 0 (0) | 0 (0) | 0 (0) | 1 (2) | 51 (125) |
| 18 | Rob Hulse | (England) | 45 (116) | 0 (6) | 2 (7) | 4 (2) | 0 (0) | 0 (0) | 51 (131) |
| 21 | Peter Coyne | (England) | 47 (135) | 1 (6) | 1 (4) | 0 (0) | 0 (0) | 0 (0) | 49 (145) |
| 21 | Clayton Donaldson | (England) | 47 (117) | 1 (5) | 0 (4) | 1 (4) | 0 (0) | 0 (0) | 49 (130) |
| 21 | Chris Riley | (Wales) | 46 (136) | 3 (14) | 0 (5) | 0 (0) | 0 (0) | 0 (0) | 49 (155) |
| 24 | Peter Gowans | (Scotland) | 43 (140) | 4 (9) | 0 (4) | 0 (0) | 0 (0) | 0 (0) | 47 (153) |
| 25 | Dele Adebola | (Nigeria) | 39 (122) | 3 (10) | 2 (7) | 2 (13) | 0 (0) | 0 (0) | 46 (152) |
| 25 | Steve Jones | (Northern Ireland) | 40 (162) | 1 (5) | 4 (6) | 1 (4) | 0 (0) | 0 (0) | 46 (177) |

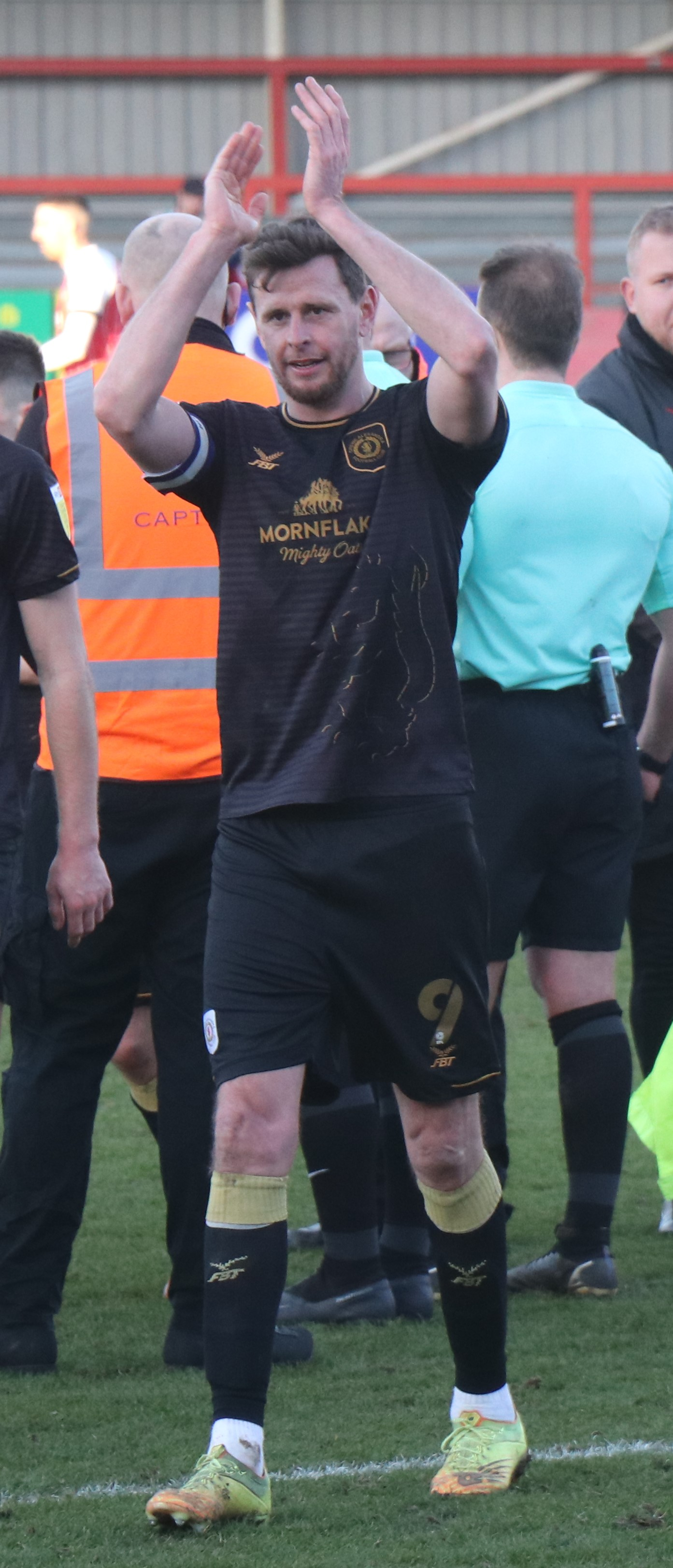
Chris Porter, the most recent player to have scored 50 or more Crewe goals (reaching milestone in November 2021)

=== International caps ===
- First capped Crewe player - William Bell, for Wales v. Ireland in Wrexham, February 1886.
- Most international caps while playing for Crewe - Clayton Ince, 31 caps for Trinidad and Tobago
- First (only) Crewe player to play in a World Cup final tournament - Efe Sodje (for Nigeria v. Argentina, 2 June 2002)

=== Transfers ===
- Highest transfer fee paid - £650,000 Rodney Jack from Torquay United in August 1998 (surpassing the £500,000 paid to Shrewsbury Town for Dave Walton in October 1997).
- Highest transfer fee received - £6 million for Nick Powell to Manchester United in 2012

=== Awards ===
PFA Awards (End-of-season Team of the Year awards, inaugurated in 1973)

- First PFA award winner - Defender Paul Edwards was the first Crewe player to feature, named in the 1990 Third Division PFA Team of the Year.
- Most PFA awards - Neil Lennon won three awards while a Crewe player (in 1994, 1995 and 1996).
- Other PFA award winners -
  - Gareth Whalley and Danny Murphy (both in 1997)
  - Rob Hulse (2004)
  - Jon Otsemobor and Luke Varney (both in 2007)
  - John Brayford (2010)
  - Luke Murphy (2013)
  - Perry Ng and Charlie Kirk (both in 2020)
  - Mickey Demetriou (2024, 2025)

EFL Player of the Month (Monthly awards, inaugurated in 2004)

- First Player of the Month award winner - Striker Dean Ashton - named EFL Championship Player of the Month for December 2004.
- Other Player of the Month award winners - both for EFL League One Player of the Month:
  - Nicky Maynard - September 2006
  - Owen Dale - December 2020

=== Other ===
- Fastest sending-off - 19 seconds, Mark Smith (v. Darlington, Third Division, 12 March 1994)

== Manager records ==
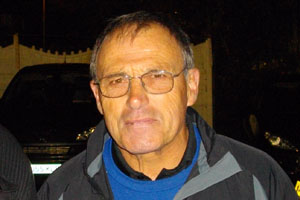
Dario Gradi managed 1,359 Crewe first team games

- Most games managed - 1,359: Dario Gradi (in four spells, 1983–2011)

=== Awards ===
- LMA League Two Manager of the Year - 1: David Artell (2019–20)
- LMA Manager of the Month - 1: Gudjon Thordarson (February 2009) and Dario Gradi (January 2011)

== Attendances ==
- Highest home attendance - 20,000 vs Tottenham Hotspur (FA Cup fourth round), 30 January 1960.
- Highest home league attendance - 17,883 vs Port Vale, 21 September 1953.
- Highest home attendance (all-seater) - 10,092 vs Manchester City, 12 March 2002.
- Highest away attendance - 64,365 at Tottenham Hotspur's White Hart Lane (FA Cup fourth round replay), 3 February 1960.
- Lowest home league attendance - 1,009 vs Peterborough United, 4 February 1986.
- Highest season average attendance - 9,065 in 1950–51
- Lowest season average attendance - 1,817 in 1986–87

== Notes and references ==
=== References ===
==== Source ====
- Crisp, Marco (1998). Crewe Alexandra Match by Match (2nd ed.). Nottingham: Tony Brown. ISBN 1-899468-81-1.
