= List of Crewe Alexandra F.C. managers =

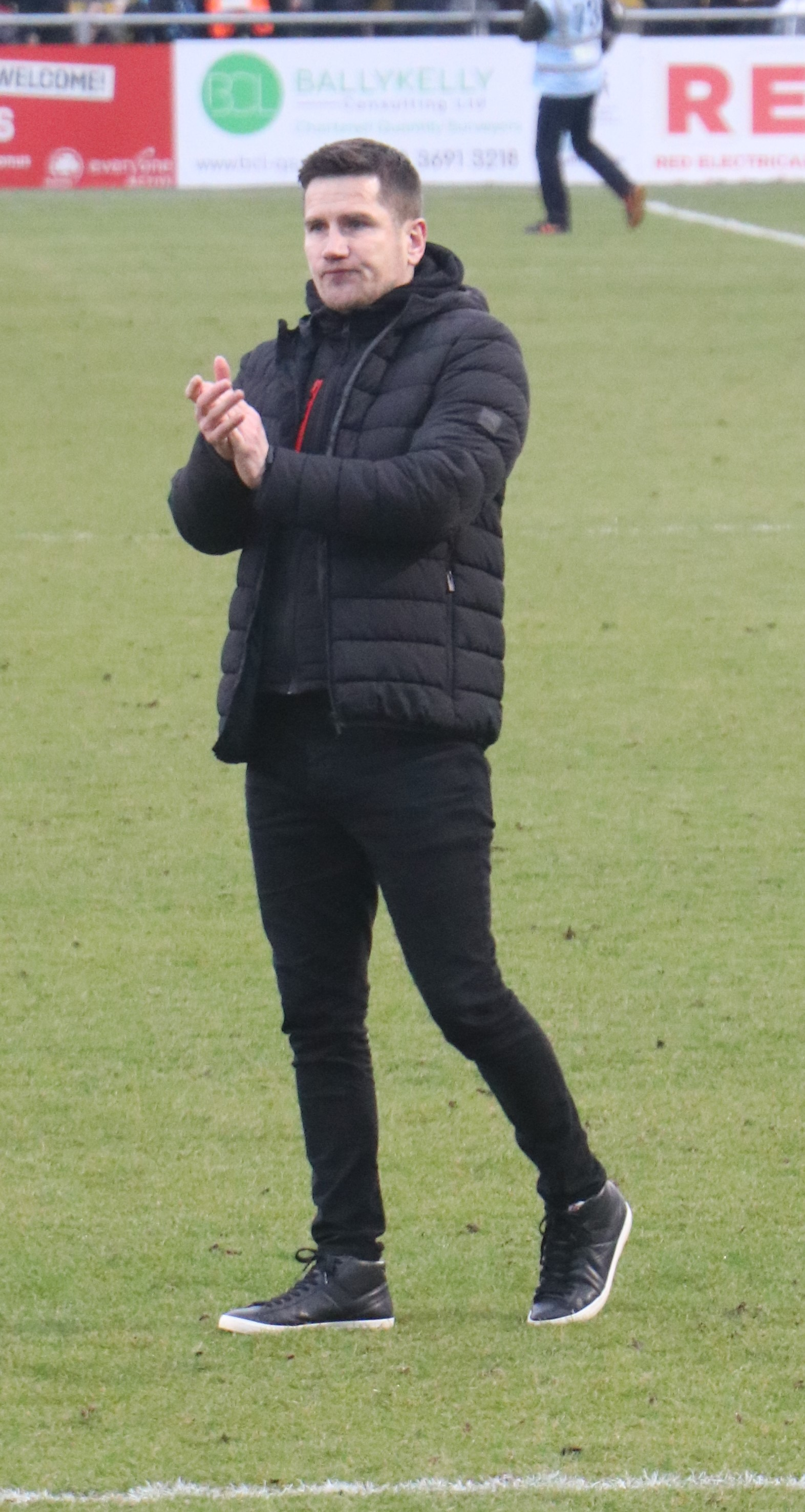
Lee Bell, current manager of Crewe Alexandra, applauding travelling supporters at Sutton United on 4 March 2023.

This is a list of former and current managers of Crewe Alexandra Football Club. Since 1892, 29 men have managed Crewe; Ernie Tagg had two spells in charge, and Dario Gradi four (including one spell co-managing with Steve Holland). Gradi holds the record for the most games: 1,359 first team games.

Two Crewe managers have been inducted into the English Football Hall of Fame: Gradi in 2004 and Harry Catterick, posthumously, in 2010.

== Managers ==
Key

- Names of caretaker managers are supplied where known, and periods of caretaker-management are highlighted in italics and marked †
- P = matches played; W = matches won; D = matches drawn; L = matches lost; Win % = win percentage
- Win percentage is rounded to two decimal places
- Statistics are complete up to and including the match played on 11 April 2026

Name	Nationality	From	To	P	W	D	L	Win%	Honours	Notes
W.C. McNeill (Note: secretary-manager)	England	August 1892	May 1894	50	12	10	28	24.00		
J.G. Hall	England	August 1895	May 1896	31	5	3	23	16.13		
Robert Roberts	Wales	January 1897	December 1897	0	0	0	0	—		
John B. Blomerley (Note: John Bradburn Blomerley (also among the club's first directors in 1899, and, in 1902, chairman of the Cheshire F.A.) was secretary-manager to 1911; honorary secretary to 1925)	England	January 1898	May 1925	169	56	44	69	33.14	4 Cheshire Senior Cups	
Tom Bailey	England	August 1925	May 1938	578	223	113	242	38.58	2 Welsh Cups	
George Lillycrop	England	August 1938	July 1944	45	20	7	18	44.44		
Frank Hill	Scotland	July 1944	October 1948	102	45	19	38	44.12		
Arthur Turner	England	October 1948	December 1951	149	56	39	54	37.58		
Harry Catterick	England	December 1951	June 1953	74	31	11	32	41.89		
Ralph Ward	England	June 1953	May 1955	96	25	28	43	26.04		
Maurice Lindley	England	August 1955	May 1958	143	23	28	92	16.08		
Harry Ware	England	August 1958	May 1960	100	36	22	42	36.00		
Jimmy McGuigan	Scotland	June 1960	November 1964	222	87	85	50	39.19		
Ernie Tagg	England	November 1964	October 1970	273	105	69	99	38.46		
Tom McAnearney	Scotland	October 1970	July 1971	39	15	9	15	38.46		
Dennis Viollet	England	August 1971	November 1971	15	4	2	9	26.67		
Jimmy Melia	England	May 1972	December 1973	70	16	23	31	22.86		
Ernie Tagg	England	January 1974	December 1974	48	13	12	23	27.08		
Harry Gregg	Northern Ireland	January 1975	May 1978	163	53	53	57	32.52		
Warwick Rimmer	England	August 1978	May 1979	46	6	14	26	13.04		
Tony Waddington	England	June 1979	July 1981	93	24	27	42	25.81		
Arfon Griffiths	Wales	August 1981	October 1982	59	9	10	40	15.25		
Peter Morris	England	November 1982	June 1983	33	8	7	18	24.24		
Dario Gradi (Note: As sole manager. Between 22 September and 17 October 2003, Gradi underwent heart surgery. Assistant manager Neil Baker took charge of the team for this period (P6, W0, D1, L5).)	England	June 1983	July 2007	1,241	464	476	301	37.39	2 Cheshire Senior Cups; 1 Second Division play-off	
Dario Gradi (Note: As technical director) Steve Holland (Note: As first team coach)	England; England	July 2007	November 2008	72	19	16	37	26.39		
Dario Gradi †	England	November 2008	December 2008	8	3	1	4	37.50		
Guðjón Þórðarson	Iceland	December 2008	October 2009	37	12	7	18	32.43		
Dario Gradi	England	October 2009	November 2011	110	38	23	49	34.55	2 Cheshire Premier Cups	
Steve Davis	England	November 2011	January 2017	272	84	71	117	30.88	1 League Trophy; 1 League Two play-off	
David Artell	Gibraltar	January 2017	April 2022	274	100	51	123	36.50		
Alex Morris	England	April 2022	November 2022	24	5	9	10	20.83		
Lee Bell	England	November 2022	Present	190	72	53	65	37.89		
