= Bert Swindells =

English footballer and manager

Personal information
- Date of birth: 13 August 1909
- Place of birth: Stockport, England
- Height: 5 ft 10 1/2 in (1.79 m)
- Position: Striker

Senior career*
Years	Team	Apps	(Gls)
1927–1937	Crewe Alexandra	247	(128)
	Chesterfield	0	(0)
- Barrow
- Chelmsford
1938	Bradford City	15	(5)
1945–1946	Mossley	2	(0)
1946–1948	Macclesfield Town	26	(11)

Managerial career
- 1949–1951: Macclesfield Town
- 1955–1958: Macclesfield Town
- * Club domestic league appearances and goals

Herbert Swindells (13 August 1909 – 2001) was an English professional footballer who first rose to prominence playing for Crewe Alexandra. He scored 128 League goals for Crewe – a club record that still stands. (Note: Crisp (1998, pp.12 and 152) twice gives a total of 128 league goals. Some other sources give a total of 126.) In 1937 he joined but never played for Chesterfield, later moving on to play for Barrow, Chelmsford, Bradford City, Mossley and Macclesfield Town, where he was joint top-scorer in the 1946–47 season. He later had two spells as manager of Macclesfield Town.

== Playing career ==
=== Crewe Alexandra ===
Swindells was born in Stockport and signed for Crewe in 1927. He made his first-team debut, aged 19, in a Third Division North game against Ashington on 6 April 1929, a game in which he also scored his first goal. He scored a further three times in the final five games of the season, and began the following season with four goals in 10 games before a prolonged layoff. He returned to the first team in December 1930, scoring ten goals in 15 appearances up to March 1931, including his first hat-trick – scoring four in a 6–2 defeat of Gateshead on 4 February 1931. He then incurred another injury and did not return until September; however, during the 1931–32 season, he scored 24 goals, including two more hat-tricks, in 31 first-team appearances, as Crewe scored a club record 95 league goals in 40 games.

Swindells missed the start of the following season, but still managed 16 goals in 34 games, often playing alongside the prolific Jimmy McConnell and Harry Deacon who scored 25 and 18 goals respectively; all three scored in Crewe's record 8–0 league win over Rotherham United on 1 October 1932. He scored 13 and 24 goals in the next two seasons, and then added 28 goals in the 1935–1936 season, including his 100th goal for the club. That season also included a benefit game against Stoke City on 20 April 1936.

In total, Swindells made 247 League appearances for Crewe, scoring 128 goals, including six hat-tricks. His last league appearance was in an away game at Halifax Town on 1 May 1937. He subsequently played in the Welsh Cup final replay four days later, scoring a goal in a 3–1 win over Rhyl to secure the club's second and last win in the competition (Crewe is not in Wales but English clubs, usually from border areas, participated by invitation).

=== Later playing career ===
In 1937, in a swap deal also involving team-mate Ernie Wright and Chesterfield's Maurice Dando and Jacob Taylor, he joined but never played for Chesterfield. He later moved on to play for Barrow, Chelmsford and Bradford City, and, after World War II, for Mossley and Macclesfield Town, where he was joint top-scorer in the 1946–47 season. During the war, Swindells also played for Stockport County.

== Managerial career ==
Swindells was also twice manager of Macclesfield Town. After a spell as reserve team manager, he took over as manager in May 1949, taking the club to the Cheshire Senior Cup final in 1950 (losing to Northwich Victoria) and the Cheshire League Cup final in 1951 (losing to Altrincham), and winning the Cheshire Senior Cup in 1951, beating Northwich Victoria 3–2. He resigned as manager in October 1951, but managed the club again from November 1955 to the end of the 1957–58 season.

== Memorial ==
A Crewe street, Herbert Swindells Close, close to Gresty Road, is named after him.
