= Ernie Tagg =

English footballer and manager

Ernie Tagg (15 November 1917 – 29 November 2006) was an English professional football player and manager, particularly associated with Crewe Alexandra.

== Playing career ==
A promising schoolboy player who represented the Cheshire county side and had trials for England schoolboys, Tagg originally joined Crewe Alexandra in October 1937 as an inside forward. His first team debut was on 15 January 1938 against Oldham Athletic, and he scored his first senior goal three weeks later, against Rochdale on 5 February 1938. In total, he made 19 appearances for Crewe, scoring seven goals. In 1939, he was transferred to Wolverhampton Wanderers for a then club record fee of £1800, but made just one appearance due to the start of the Second World War. Post-war, he played for Bournemouth and Carlisle United before returning to south Cheshire to play for non-league Nantwich Town.

== Management career ==
Tagg returned to Crewe in the early 1950s as coach under the then manager Ralph Ward, becoming manager himself in 1964. He retained the post until effectively sacking himself in 1971 because he felt a younger manager should take charge of the club. He was replaced by Tom McAnearney and then Dennis Viollet (though he also acted as club secretary until 1972; at different times, other roles included ball-boy and groundsman). He returned as manager during 1974 before Harry Gregg arrived at the club in January 1975.

Players developed during his time at Crewe included internationals Stan Bowles and John Mahoney. Tagg is often quoted in respect of Bowles's gambling problems; he used to give Stan's wages direct to his wife, saying: "If he could pass a bookies as well as he passes a football, he'd be a very rich man." Tagg was also acknowledged by soccer coach Alan Hargreaves for giving him the opportunity to enter professional football.

Being manager at Crewe was not well-paid, and Tagg supplemented his income by delivering milk and managing a beer delivery round. He later managed a Crewe pub, The Vine. Stan Bowles said:

"It was Ernie Tagg who made that crack about my ability to pass a betting shop. It was a bit rich, coming from him. Ernie had a pub [The Vine], and I remember him staying there for a darts match instead of watching a game once. At least I used to turn up!"

He was made an Honorary Life Vice President of the club in 1984, and was included in Crewe and Nantwich Borough Council's Roll of Honour.
