= Maurice Dando =

English footballer (1905–1949)

Personal information
- Date of birth: July 1905
- Place of birth: Bristol, England
- Date of death: 1949 (aged 43–44)
- Height: 5 ft 7 in (1.70 m)
- Position: Striker

Senior career*
Years	Team	Apps	(Gls)
	Kingswood	?	(?)
	Bath City	?	(?)
	Bracknell's	?	(?)
1928–1932	Bristol Rovers	18	(5)
1933–1934	York City	82	(46)
1935	Chesterfield	27	(29)
1937	Crewe Alexandra	16	(2)
- * Club domestic league appearances and goals

Maurice Dando (July 1905 in Bristol, England – 1949) was an English footballer.

== Career ==
Dando played for Bath City before joining Bristol Rovers in 1928, initially as an amateur. He joined York City in the summer of 1933, where he scored twice on his debut against Crewe Alexandra on 30 August 1933. He finished the 1933–34 season with 25 goals in 41 league appearances. The following season he scored 21 league goals. During these two seasons, he scored three hat-tricks. He scored a total of 46 goals in 86 league and cup appearances for York.

Dando joined Chesterfield in June 1935 and scored 27 goals as the club won the Division Three North in the 1935–36. He moved to Crewe Alexandra two years later, in a deal which also saw Bert Swindells join Chesterfield from Crewe. Dando died in 1949 at the age of 44 after being troubled by ill health.
