= 1896 Welsh Cup final =

1896 football match in Llandudno, Wales

1896 Football Association of Wales Challenge Cup final
- Event: 1895–96 Welsh Cup
Bangor	Wrexham
3	1
- Date: 6 April 1896
- Venue: the Council Field, Llandudno
- Referee: T Gough (Oswestry)
- Attendance: 7,000

The 1896 Welsh Cup final, the 19th in the competition, was contested by Bangor and Wrexham at the Council Field, Llandudno. Bangor won 3–1.

== Route to the final ==
=== Bangor ===
Round	Opposition	Score	Venue
First Round	Llandudno Swifts	3–1	the Council Field (a)
Second Round	bye to the next round.		
Third Round	Westminster Rovers	1–1	Maes y Dre (h)
Replay	Westminster Rovers	1–3	Stansty Park (a)
Fourth Round	Wellington St George	1–1	Maes y Dre (h)
Replay	Wellington St George	4–0	Maes y Dre (h)
Semi-final	Newtown	1–1	Racecourse Ground (n)
Replay	Newtown	3–0	Racecourse Ground (n)

Bangor's route to the final took seven games, with their first against Llandudno Swifts being forced into extra time. Bangor travelled to the venue of that year's final to face the 'Swifts', where drawing the game 2–2 after 90 minutes, Bangor won 3–2 in extra time.

In the second round, Bangor received a bye into the third, due to no teams being close enough to travel to, and there they welcomed Westminster Rovers to their Maes y Dre field. Another draw, 1–1, after 90 minutes the game was replayed at Westminster, where Bangor won 3–1.

In the Fourth Round, Bangor once again draw 1–1, this time against Wellington St George. The game was replayed, once again at Maes y Dre.

Now only one game from the Bangor's second final, they faced last years winners Newtown. Taking the game to another 1–1 draw, Bangor went on to win 3–0 in the replay. Both games were played at the home of the final opponents, the Racecourse Ground.

=== Wrexham ===
As runners-up in the previous years Welsh Cup, Wrexham joined the 1896 competition in the fourth round.

Round	Opposition	Score	Venue
Fourth Round	Chirk AAA	4–0	Racecourse Ground (h)
Semi-final	Aberystwyth Town	1–0	Welshpool (n)

== Match ==
=== Detail ===
6 April 1896
15:30

Bangor	3–1	Wrexham
T Thomas 5'; C Jones; J Roberts		Pugh

Council Field, Llandudno
Attendance: 7,000
Referee: T Gough (Oswestry)

Bangor	Wrexham

BANGOR:
GK	1	(Wales) W Arridge
DF	2	(Wales) R Roberts
DF	3	(England) D H Williams
DF	4	(Wales) W H Jones
DF	5	(Wales) T Buckland
MF	6	(Wales) S Roberts
MF	7	(England) Walter Lewis
MF	8	(England) R Owen
FW	9	(Wales) C Jones
FW	10	(England) J Roberts
DF	11	(England) T Thomas

WREXHAM:
GK	1	(England) W Ball
DF	2	(England) E Samuels
DF	3	(Republic of Ireland) A E Ellis
MF	4	(England) F Stokes
MF	5	(Wales) E Robinson
MF	6	(Wales) J P Rogers
MF	7	(England) D H Pugh
MF	8	(Wales) Trevor Owen
FW	9	(Wales) J Hughes
FW	10	(England) W C Harrison
FW	11	(England) A Williams

MATCH RULES

- 90 minutes.
- Replay if scores still level.

== Notes ==
1. ^{nb1}
