= Trevor Owen =

Welsh footballer

Personal information
- Date of birth: 1873
- Place of birth: Llangollen, Wales

Senior career*
Years	Team	Apps	(Gls)
1892–1896	Wrexham		
1896–1898	Druids		
1898–????	Crewe Alexandra		
- Wolverhampton Wandrers

International career
1899	Wales	2	(0)
- * Club domestic league appearances and goals

Trevor Owen (born 1873) was a Welsh international footballer. He was part of the Wales national football team, playing 2 matches. He played his first match on 18 March 1899 against Scotland and his last match on 20 March 1899 against England. At club level he played for Wrexham, where he played in the 1896 Welsh Cup Final against Bangor City, Crewe Alexandra and Wolverhampton Wanderers.

== See also ==
- List of Wales international footballers (alphabetical)
