= Tom Bailey (football administrator) =

English Football Club Manager

Tom Bailey (23 July 1884 - 22 September 1965) was secretary of Crewe Alexandra Football Club from 1924 to 1952, and was Crewe manager from 1925 to 1938. He managed the side through 578 matches - a total only exceeded by Dario Gradi some 60 years later.

== Career ==
Bailey's part-time administrative roles at Crewe Alexandra started during its time in the Birmingham & District League when he served as a steward for some years, while also working in the engineering department at Crewe's railway works.

In 1919 Bailey was appointed assistant secretary to John Bradburn Blomerley at Crewe Alexandra. His first year as assistant secretary was difficult. Football was still recovering from the effects of the First World War and much hard work and organising ability was required to put the club back on its feet. Blomerley died in 1924 and Bailey succeeded him as club secretary. Bailey was Crewe manager from August 1925 to 1938, during which time Crewe remained in the Third Division North, finishing 6th in 1931–32 and 1935–36, and winning the Welsh Cup twice, in 1936 and 1937. While Bailey was manager, Crewe won 223 out of 578 matches (his 13-year span as Crewe manager remained the longest until surpassed by Dario Gradi in the 1990s). After stepping down as manager in May 1938, Bailey was succeeded by George Lillycrop in August 1938.

Bailey continued as honorary secretary until 1952 when he retired owing to ill health but remained connected to the club in an advisory capacity. He represented Crewe Alexandra on the Cheshire County League for 21 years and was later appointed Vice President of the League. A First Division manager once said of Bailey: "What he does not know about soccer law and administration is not worth knowing."

In the Crewe Chronicle on 22 February 1947, Bailey described his long association with the club, including the story of Arthur Rigby - a transfer that made football headlines in the early 1920s:

"Masters from Nottingham Forest came to see me one day’ recalled Tom Bailey. ‘They offered a certain sum for Rigby who was at our outside-left position then. We asked £800 for him, but Masters thought this too high. While Masters was with me a telegram arrived, allegedly from Bradford City offering £1,000 for him. Who sent the telegram remains a mystery but Masters didn’t take the bait! Blackburn later offered a large sum for him but we asked for £800 and they refused. Bradford eventually offered £1,000 for him and we made the transfer.’ This was not the end of the story as Mr Bailey explained, ‘for Blackburn became so keen to get him that they paid Bradford £3,000 for him!"

== Personal life ==
Tom Bailey was born on 23 July 1884 in Crewe, the son of Thomas Bailey, a railway signalman and Elizabeth Bailey. He married Harriet Elizabeth Bailey (1889 - 1975) of Liverpool on 16 September 1911 at All Saints Church, Stoneycroft, Lancashire, and they had four children. He was a railway clerk at Crewe Works until his retirement in 1949. He was Chairman of the Crewe Bowling Club.

He died at the Barony Hospital, Nantwich on 22 September 1965 aged 81. Before kick-off in the Football League Cup second round tie between Crewe and Cardiff City at Gresty Road later that day, there was a silent tribute to Bailey.
