= Geoff Crudgington =

English footballer

Personal information
- Full name: Geoff Crudgington
- Date of birth: 14 February 1952 (age 74)
- Place of birth: Wolverhampton, England
- Height: 6 ft 0 in (1.83 m)
- Position: Goalkeeper

Youth career
- Wolverhampton Wanderers

Senior career*
Years	Team	Apps	(Gls)
1969–1972	Aston Villa	4	(0)
1970–1971	→ Bradford City (loan)	1	(0)
1971	→ Toronto Metros (loan)	6	(0)
1972–1978	Crewe Alexandra	236	(0)
1978–1979	Swansea City	52	(0)
1979–1988	Plymouth Argyle	326	(0)
Total		625	(0)
- * Club domestic league appearances and goals

Geoff Crudgington (born 14 February 1952) is an English former professional footballer who made 633 appearances in the Football League playing as a goalkeeper for Aston Villa, Bradford City, Toronto Metros, Crewe Alexandra, Swansea City and Plymouth Argyle. He went on to become a Community officer and goalkeeping coach at Plymouth Argyle. Crudgington served as the club's Chief Scout from May 2010 until January 2011 when, as a result of the club's financial difficulties, he left the club by mutual consent.
