= Alfred Owen Davies =

Welsh footballer

Alfred Davies
Personal information
- Date of birth: 1863
- Place of birth: Wales
- Date of death: 8 September 1932 (aged 68–69)
- Position: Defender

Senior career*
Years	Team	Apps	(Gls)
- Barmouth FC
- Corinthian
- Crewe Alexandra

International career
1885–1890	Wales	9	(0)
- * Club domestic league appearances and goals

Alfred Davies (1863 – 8 September 1932) was a Welsh international footballer. He was part of the Wales national football team between 1885 and 1890, playing 9 matches. He played his first match on 11 April 1885 against Ireland and his last match on 15 March 1890 against England. At club level, he played for Crewe Alexandra.

He also played for Barmouth, Rhyl, Druids, and Corinthian.

Alfred Owen Davies was also a Doctor and had a practice at Overton-on-Dee.

== See also ==
- List of Wales international footballers (alphabetical)
