= Harry Deacon =

English footballer

Personal information
- Full name: Henry Deacon
- Date of birth: 25 April 1900
- Place of birth: Sheffield, England
- Date of death: 15 January 1946 (aged 45)
- Place of death: Rotherham, England
- Height: 5 ft 8 in (1.73 m)
- Position: Inside forward

Senior career*
Years	Team	Apps	(Gls)
- Hallam
1919–1920	Sheffield Wednesday	0	(0)
1920–1922	Birmingham	2	(0)
1922–1931	Swansea Town	319	(86)
1931–1934	Crewe Alexandra	118	(47)
1934	Southport	9	(2)
1934–1935	Accrington Stanley	25	(11)
1935–1936	Rotherham United	6	(0)
- * Club domestic league appearances and goals

Henry Deacon (25 April 1900 – 15 January 1946) was an English professional footballer who made 479 appearances in the Football League playing for Birmingham, Swansea Town, Crewe Alexandra, Southport, Accrington Stanley and Rotherham United. He played as an inside forward.

== Playing career ==
Deacon was born in the Darnall district of Sheffield, and played football for Hallam before joining Sheffield Wednesday as an amateur. He moved on to Birmingham in 1920, and made his debut in the First Division on 4 February 1922, deputising for Johnny Crosbie in a home game against Liverpool which resulted in a 2–0 defeat. After two games in two seasons, unable to dislodge Crosbie from the inside right position, Deacon moved on to Swansea Town where he found considerably more success.

In nine seasons with the club, he scored 86 goals in 316 league games, played a major role in their promotion to the Second Division as Third Division South champions in the 1924–25 season, and helped them reach the final of the Welsh Cup and the semi-final of the FA Cup the following season. In recognition of his service to the club, Swansea awarded him a testimonial match which was attended by 9,000 spectators.

Deacon went on to spend three seasons with Crewe Alexandra where he scored 47 goals in 118 Third Division North games. He then began the 1934–35 season at Southport, finishing it with Accrington Stanley, where his 11 goals gave him runner-up spot in their scoring charts despite arriving midway through the season. He ended his professional career with Rotherham United, making his last Football League appearance just before Christmas 1935.

Deacon died in Rotherham, Yorkshire, in 1946 at the age of 45.
