= Peter Leigh =

English footballer (1939–2024)

Personal information
- Date of birth: 4 March 1939
- Place of birth: Manchester, England
- Date of death: 11 February 2024 (aged 84)
- Position: Defender

Senior career*
| Years | Team | Apps | (Gls) |
| 1959–1960 | Manchester City | 2 | (0) |
| 1960–1972 | Crewe Alexandra | 432 | (3) |
| Total | | 434 | (3) |
- * Club domestic league appearances and goals

Peter Leigh (4 March 1939 – 11 February 2024) was an English professional footballer who played as a defender for Manchester City and Crewe Alexandra.

Leigh made his Crewe debut at Barrow on 19 August 1961, and scored his first Crewe goal on the opening day of the 1967–68 season, in a 1–1 draw against Chesterfield F.C. at Gresty Road on 19 August 1967. He went on to set a record for the most first-team appearances for Crewe (473), surpassing his contemporary Eric Barnes (352), only to then himself be surpassed by his defender team-mate Tommy Lowry in 1977.

Leigh died on 11 February 2024, at the age of 84.

== Honours ==
Crewe Alexandra

- Football League Fourth Division fourth-place promotion: 1967–68
