= William Bell (Welsh footballer) =

Welsh footballer

Personal information
- Full name: William Strafford Bell
- Date of birth: 22 August 1860
- Place of birth: Newtown, Wales
- Date of death: 1930 (aged 69–70)
- Place of death: Birmingham, Warwickshire, England
- Position: Midfielder

Senior career*
Years	Team	Apps	(Gls)
- Shrewsbury Engineers
1884–1891	Crewe Alexandra		

International career
1881–1886	Wales	5	(0)
- * Club domestic league appearances and goals

William Strafford Bell (22 August 1860-1930) was a Welsh footballer who played as a defender. He was part of the Wales national team between 1881 and 1886, playing five matches. He played his first match on 26 February 1881 against England and his last match on 10 April 1886 against Scotland.

He played club football for Crewe Alexandra F.C. from 1884 to 1891, playing six games in Crewe's first season in the first incarnation of The Combination league in 1888-89, and the following two seasons in the Football Alliance, making a total of 26 appearances in all competitions. On 22 March 1890, he played in his own benefit match, against Burslem Port Vale, which Crewe won 4–2. He made his final appearance for Crewe in January 1891, also against Burslem Port Vale.

== Personal life ==
William Strafford Bell was born on 22 August 1860 in Newtown, Wales to George Bell and Mary Ann Strafford.

On 6 April 1885, Bell married Sarah Price in Gorton, Manchester. They had a son together, William Strafford Bell Jr, in 1889 in Crewe, Cheshire.

Bell died in 1930 in Birmingham, Warwickshire.

== See also ==
- List of Wales international footballers (alphabetical)
