= Richard Owen Jones =

Welsh footballer

Richard Jones
Personal information
- Full name: Richard Owen Jones
- Date of birth: 1867
- Place of birth: Wales
- Date of death: 1936 (aged 68–69)

Senior career*
| Years | Team | Apps | (Gls) |
- Bangor

International career
| 1887–1890 | Wales | 3 | (0) |
- * Club domestic league appearances and goals

Richard Owen Jones (1867 – 1936) was a Welsh international footballer. He was part of the Wales national football team between 1887 and 1890, playing 3 matches. He played his first match on 21 March 1887 against Scotland and his last match on 15 March 1890 against England. At club level, he played for Bangor.

== See also ==
- List of Wales international footballers (alphabetical)
