= Allan Hargreaves =

English footballer

Personal information
- Full name: Allan Hargreaves
- Date of birth: 29 March 1931
- Place of birth: Dewsbury, England
- Date of death: February 2013 (aged 81)
- Place of death: Kirklees, England
- Position: Forward

Senior career*
Years	Team	Apps	(Gls)
1951–1956	Bradford City	4	(1)
- * Club domestic league appearances and goals

Allan Hargreaves (29 March 1931 – February 2013) is an English former professional footballer who played as a forward.

== Career ==
Born in Dewsbury, Hargreaves played for Bradford City.

For Bradford City he made four appearances in the Football League.

== Sources ==
- Frost, Terry (1988). Bradford City A Complete Record 1903-1988. Breedon Books Sport. ISBN 0-907969-38-0.
