= Cheshire Premier Cup =

The Cheshire Premier Cup was a football knockout tournament that took place within the English county of Cheshire between the Cheshire clubs that were at the time in The Football League. It was run by the local Cheshire FA.

The tournament first began during the 2008–09 season, but a previous competition of the same name ran until 1981–82 with Tranmere Rovers having been the last winners. That competition was often played in pre-season using either a knockout or round robin format between the county's Football League clubs. That competition was also previously known as the Cheshire Bowl.

Every competition final following the competition's revival went to extra-time, most recently with Stockport County taking the cup after a 4–3 penalty shoot-out victory over two-time champions Crewe Alexandra at Edgeley Park in 2011. At the time of the competition's revival in 2008 there were five Football League clubs that fell under the Cheshire FA but by 2015 there would just be Crewe left, as Chester City, Macclesfield Town, Stockport County and Tranmere Rovers all suffered relegation to non-league football.

== Results ==
| Season | Winner | Score | Runner-up | Venue |
|---|---|---|---|---|
| 2008-09 | Crewe Alexandra | 3-1(aet) | Macclesfield Town | Moss Rose |
| 2009-10 | Crewe Alexandra | 2-1(aet) | Macclesfield Town | Alexandra Stadium |
| 2010-11 | Stockport County | 1-1*(aet) | Crewe Alexandra | Edgeley Park |

- County Won 4-3 On Penalties.

== Participating teams ==
Crewe Alexandra

Macclesfield Town

Stockport County

Tranmere Rovers

Chester City (2008-09 only)

== History of Winners ==
| Team | No. of wins |
|---|---|
| Crewe Alexandra | 2 |
| Stockport County | 1 |
