= Tommy Lowry =

English footballer (1945–2015)

Personal information
- Full name: Thomas Lowry
- Date of birth: 26 August 1945
- Place of birth: Liverpool, England
- Date of death: 22 August 2015 (aged 69)
- Height: 5 ft 9 in (1.75 m)
- Position: Defender

Senior career*
Years	Team	Apps	(Gls)
1964–1966	Liverpool	1	(0)
1966–1977	Crewe Alexandra	436	(2)
Total		437	(2)
- * Club domestic league appearances and goals

Tommy Lowry (26 August 1945 – 22 August 2015) was an English professional footballer who played as a defender, at right back, for Liverpool and Crewe Alexandra.

He joined Liverpool in 1961, and signed professional forms in 1963, before making his only first team appearance in a 3–1 win at Wolverhampton Wanderers in the final game of the season on 26 April 1965. He left Liverpool after his contract expired in 1966, and joined Crewe. He made his debut in a 1–0 win over Southend United at Gresty Road on 22 October 1966. Lowry scored twice for Crewe, both against Brentford at Gresty Road, on 23 September 1970 and on 15 March 1975.

He made a record 481 league and cup appearances for Crewe Alexandra, beating a record set by former team-mate Peter Leigh, and making his final appearance away at Scunthorpe United on 23 August 1977. After retiring from football, he worked at Rolls-Royce in Crewe for over 25 years.

== Honours ==
with Crewe Alexandra

- Football League Fourth Division fourth-place promotion: 1967–68
