= Ralph Ward =

English footballer

Personal information
- Full name: Ralph Arthur Ward
- Date of birth: 5 February 1911
- Place of birth: Oadby, England
- Date of death: 1983 (aged 71–72)
- Place of death: England
- Height: 5 ft 8 1/2 in (1.74 m)
- Position: Full back

Senior career*
Years	Team	Apps	(Gls)
	Hinckley United	?	(?)
1929–1935	Bradford Park Avenue	129	(0)
1936–1938	Tottenham Hotspur	115	(10)
1946–1948	Crewe Alexandra	91	(7)
- * Club domestic league appearances and goals

Ralph Arthur Ward (5 February 1911 – 1983) was an English professional footballer who played for Hinckley United, Tottenham Hotspur, Bradford Park Avenue, Crewe Alexandra and represented England at schoolboy level. He was born in Oadby, Leicestershire.

== Football career ==
Ward began his career at Hinckley United before joining Bradford Park Avenue in November 1929 where he played a total of 129 matches as a full back. He transferred to the Spurs in March 1936 and made his debut at White Hart Lane against West Ham United in March of that year. Ward featured in 132 games and scoring on 11 occasions in a war- interrupted career at the club. He became the club captain and penalty taker during the war years. His tough approach to the game earned him the nickname - "The Butcher". Ward moved to Crewe Alexandra in August 1946 where he went on to make a further 91 appearances and netting seven goals. He later went on to manage the side between 1953–55.

== After football ==
Ward returned to his home town, Oadby, to run his own successful haulage business. He also opened a pet shop.
