= Crewe Alexandra F.C. =

Association football club in England

Crewe Alexandra
- Full name: Crewe Alexandra Football Club
- Nicknames: The Railwaymen; The Alex
- Founded: August 1877; 149 years ago
- Ground: Gresty Road
- Capacity: 10,153
- Chairman: Charles Grant
- Manager: Lee Bell
- League: EFL League Two
- 2025–26: EFL League Two, 11th of 24
- Website: crewealex.net
Home colours	Away colours

Crewe Alexandra Football Club is a professional association football club based in the town of Crewe, Cheshire, England. Its first team competes in League Two, the fourth level of the English football league system. Nicknamed 'The Railwaymen' because of the town's links with the rail industry, and also commonly known as 'The Alex', they have played at their current Gresty Road location (adjoining the sites of two previous grounds) since 1906. The supporters' fiercest rivalry is with Staffordshire-based side Port Vale.

The club was formed in August 1877 as the football division of Crewe Alexandra Cricket Club, named after Princess Alexandra. Crewe reached the FA Cup semi-finals in 1888 and were then a founding member of the Football League Second Division in 1892. In 1921, the club was invited to join the newly created Football League Third Division North, where they stayed for the next 37 years before being placed in the new Fourth Division in 1958. The team achieved their first promotion after finishing third in 1962–63. Crewe were immediately relegated the next season but were promoted again in 1967–68, but again lasted just one season in the Third Division.

Crewe spent 20 years struggling in the fourth tier before their fortunes were revived under Dario Gradi, manager for 24 years from 1983. Under his leadership, Crewe were twice promoted to the third tier from the fourth, and, in 1997, won the Second Division play-off final to secure a place in the Football League First Division. After an absence of 101 years, they played at this second tier level―renamed the Championship before the start of the 2004–05 season―for eight of the following nine seasons. Gradi encouraged Crewe to play attractive, technical football and built a reputation for developing young players, with future England internationals David Platt, Danny Murphy, Seth Johnson and Dean Ashton all emerging at the club. After Crewe dropped down to the fourth tier again in 2009, Steve Davis led the club to promotion to the third tier via the play-offs in 2012. In 2013, the club won its first and only Football League Trophy. Under David Artell, manager from January 2017, Crewe returned to third tier League One in 2020 and finished 12th in the 2020–21 season, but were relegated in 2022.

== History ==
=== Formation and early years ===
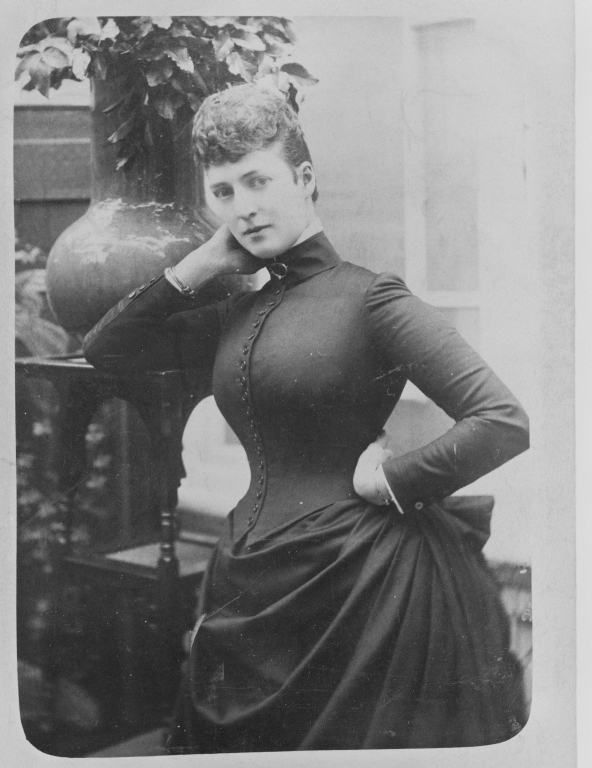
The club's namesake Alexandra, Princess of Wales, photographed in 1880

Crewe Alexandra Football Club was formed in August 1877 as an offshoot of Crewe Alexandra Cricket Club (established in September 1866 by Thomas Abraham (Note: Abraham also supported the formation of the Cheshire Football Association in 1878, being appointed secretary, and was an umpire in the first Lancashire Senior Cup final, held at Darwen in 1880. He refereed the first Liverpool Senior Cup final, also in 1880, and travelled extensively to umpire Crewe Alexandra's matches. He also made a significant contribution to amateur athletics, helping organise annual events at the cricket club's ground in Earle Street, as well as becoming a long-standing official of the Northern Counties Athletic Association and the Amateur Athletic Association.) and other workers at Crewe locomotive works), (Note: Crisp notes 1950s newspaper correspondence suggesting the formation of a football club was proposed by cricketer A.N. Hornby, who also played professional football, and who elicited the support of 'Thomas Abrams' (presumably Thomas Abraham) and John O'Brien Tandy.) and named after Alexandra, Princess of Wales (a German–Danish princess who had married Prince Albert Edward (later King Edward VII), and who would become Queen–Empress Alexandra in 1901). They were based at the Alexandra Recreation Ground in Crewe, adjacent to Crewe railway station, and played their first match against a side from Basford in North Staffordshire on 1 December 1877, drawing 1–1. In 1883, Crewe Alexandra's first match in the FA Cup was against Scottish club Queen's Park of Glasgow, losing 10–0. In February 1886, William Bell became the first Crewe player to win an international cap, playing for Wales against Ireland in Wrexham. In 1887–88, the club played 33 games (winning 20, drawing 5 and losing 8); the club also reached the FA Cup semi-finals, defeating Swifts, (Note: Crewe drew 2–2, and lost the replay 3–2, but successfully appealed against the result in respect of the size of the Swifts' goals (the crossbars were too low). Crewe won the replay played at a neutral ground, Derby County's Baseball Ground, 2–1.) Derby County and Middlesbrough en route, before going out to Preston North End. In 1891, the football club split away from the cricket club—a step that was condemned by Francis Webb, chief engineer of the town's London and North Western Railway (LNWR) Crewe works, who was virulently opposed to professionalism in sport; following the schism, Webb and the LNWR said the company would "refuse to find employment in the Crewe Works for any professional football player", a decision "commented on very unfavourably in the town". Consequently, "the football section of the Alexandra Club owed little to the LNWR..., despite the teams being closely linked to the local railway industry" (though one of Webb's successors as LNWR's chief engineer, Charles Bowen Cooke, was "less intractable" and "was President of Crewe Alexandra Football Club and the professional athletics meetings it organised").

On 5 March 1892, John Pearson became the first Crewe player to win an England cap, playing against Ireland in Belfast; he remains the only Crewe player capped for the full England side while playing for the club.

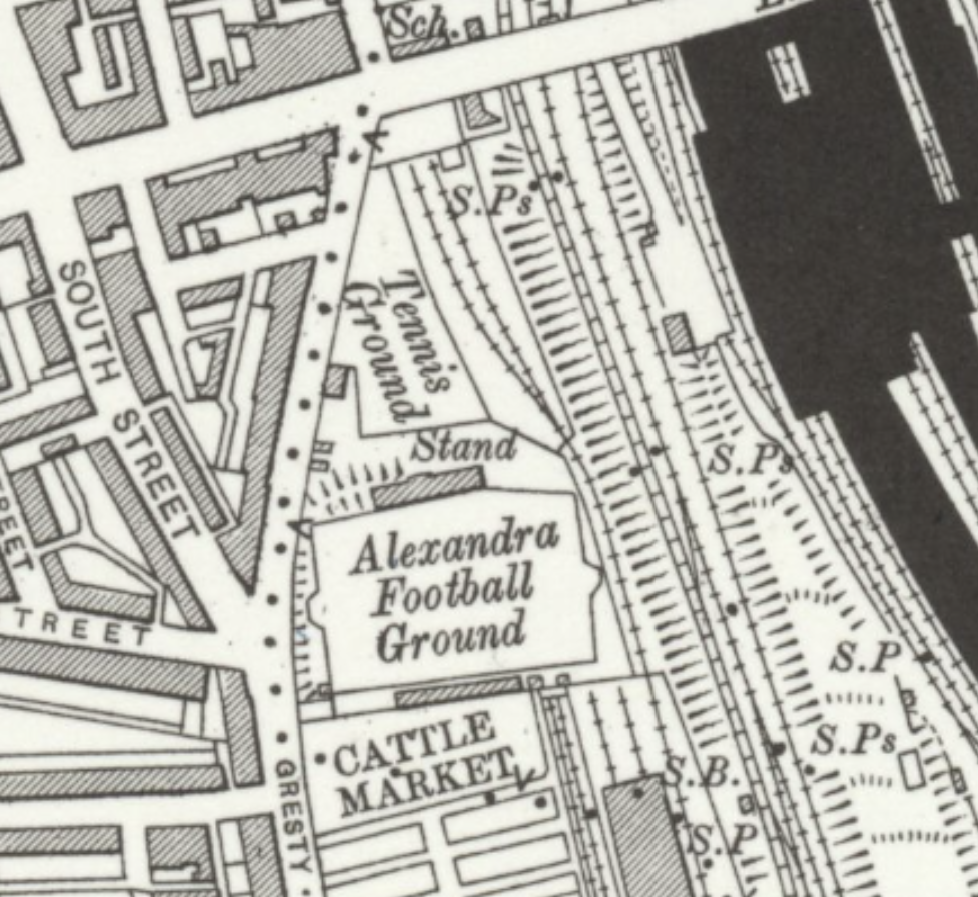
1911 Ordnance Survey map showing Alexandra Football Ground in its current location

Crewe secretary J.G. Hall helped found the unsuccessful Combination (launched at Crewe's Royal Hotel in early 1889) and then the Football Alliance (1889–1892). When the latter merged with the Football League, Crewe were a founding member of the Football League Second Division in 1892, but lost their league status in 1896 after only four seasons—finishing third from bottom, fourth from bottom, then bottom twice—possibly due to a player budget that was a quarter of that of other clubs. The club left the Alexandra Recreation Ground shortly before the end of the 1895–96 season, and after playing at a number of different venues, including in nearby Sandbach, they moved to the first Gresty Road ground in 1897 (in 1906, the club's current ground adjacent to Gresty Road was constructed to the west of its previous site). Incorporated as a limited company on 29 May 1899, (Note: The first Articles of Association lists seven directors, three of whom were railway clerks (as was the first company secretary), plus a tailor, grocer, painter and foreman.) Crewe spent two further seasons in the second incarnation of the Combination from 1896 followed by three seasons in the Lancashire League, before competing in the Birmingham & District League for ten years. They also won the Cheshire Senior Challenge Cup in 1907 and 1910. The team spent the 1910s in the Central League, finishing second in 1913–14 and 1920–21.

Chart of table positions of Crewe Alexandra in the Football League

Crewe rejoined the Football League in 1921; they finished 6th in their first two seasons in the Third Division North but did not finish as high again until 1931–32 and 1935–36. In October 1932, defender Fred Keenor's last Wales appearance marked Crewe's first international cap of the 20th century. Crewe's first major honours were Welsh Cup wins in 1936 and 1937; Crewe is not in Wales but English clubs, usually from border areas, participated by invitation. In 1936, Bert Swindells scored his 100th League goal for Crewe, going on to score 128 League goals for the club, a record that still stands, as well as goals in both Welsh Cup finals.

=== Post-World War II ===
From the 1950s to the early 1980s, Crewe enjoyed only occasional success. Looking over Gresty Road, Michael Palin, in the 1980 BBC Great Railway Journeys of the World series, described Crewe as "like those other railway towns, Swindon and Doncaster, possessed of a football team which is perpetually propping up the bottom of the Fourth Division". Between 1894 and 1982, Crewe finished last in the Football League eight times, more than any other league club. On 25 December 1954, Crewe embarked on a sequence where they did not win away from home for 56 matches; the run ended with a 1–0 win at Southport on 24 April 1957. Crewe finished bottom of Division Three North three times in a row from 1955–56 to 1957–58, tallying just 28, 21 and 23 points from 46 games in the respective seasons (the club also set a then Football League record of 30 games without a win from September 1956 to April 1957). The club was placed into the newly formed Fourth Division in 1958–59.

All-time records were set against First Division Tottenham Hotspur in the FA Cup fourth round in 1960. A new record Gresty Road attendance of 20,000 saw Crewe hold Spurs to a 2–2 draw on 30 January. On 3 February, Tottenham convincingly won the replay 13–2, Crewe's record defeat. The following year, however, Jimmy McGuigan's Crewe side defeated another First Division club, Chelsea, 2–1 in the FA Cup at Stamford Bridge on 7 January 1961. Chelsea's side included former Crewe player Frank Blunstone—who scored Chelsea's goal—as well as England internationals Peter Bonetti, Jimmy Greaves and Terry Venables. Crewe were then again drawn against the eventual double-winning Spurs side, who won 5–1 in the fourth round at White Hart Lane.

==== 1960s promotions and relegations ====
In 1963, Crewe secured their first promotion to the Third Division, winning the season's final game against Exeter City, with Frank Lord scoring the only goal in front of a crowd of 9,807 at Gresty Road. Lord holds the record for most hat-tricks for the club with eight, and he scored a then record 33 goals that season, forming a strong partnership with Johnny King (17 goals). The club finished in third place, behind champions Brentford and Oldham Athletic, but were relegated back to Division Four the following season. In the 1964–65 season, Terry Harkin set a new record of 34 league goals for Crewe. Managed by Ernie Tagg, the club achieved promotion for a second time in 1967–68, but again spent just one season in the Third Division.

==== 1970s and early 1980s ====
From 1969, Crewe spent 20 years in Division Four, finishing bottom in 1971–72, 1978–79 and 1981–82, and not achieving a top half finish until 1985. In 1974, they came within two minutes of taking Aston Villa into extra time in a League Cup third round replay at Villa Park. In 1977, Tommy Lowry played his record-setting 475th and last game for the Railwaymen; he had earlier passed Peter Leigh's total of 430 appearances between 1960 and 1972. From February to September 1979, the club went a record 16 matches (15 league, one League Cup tie) without winning at Gresty Road. In December 1979, manager Tony Waddington signed the goalkeeper Bruce Grobbelaar who kept eight clean-sheets in his 24 matches played, and, on 5 May 1980, scored a penalty—his only professional goal—to seal a 2–0 victory over York City.

=== Gradi years (1983–2011) ===
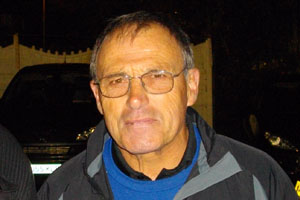
Dario Gradi managed 1,359 Crewe first team games.

In June 1983, after Crewe finished second from bottom at the end of the 1982–83 season, the club chairman Norman Rowlinson appointed Milan-born Dario Gradi as manager. Gradi looked to build an academy structure to develop players that could be sold to help fund the player development programme. Among his early transfer successes were Geoff Thomas and John Pemberton (both signed from Rochdale and sold to Crystal Palace, in 1987 and 1988 respectively), and former Manchester United apprentice David Platt, signed in 1985 and sold to Aston Villa for £200,000 in February 1988.

Under Gradi, and despite some Crewe fans' initial reservations, Crewe played attractive, technical football and gained a reputation for developing young talent. Steve Walters became Crewe's then youngest player, aged just 16 years and 119 days when he played against Peterborough United on 7 May 1988. In 1989, Crewe won their third promotion, a 1–1 draw at Tranmere Rovers enough to take both teams into the Third Division. Meanwhile, on 7 January 1989, Crewe had hosted Aston Villa—and Platt—at Gresty Road in the FA Cup third round, taking a 2–0 lead before the visitors rallied to secure a 3–2 win, with Platt netting the winner but refusing to celebrate against his former club. A year later, on 6 January 1990, Crewe were drawn away at Chelsea in the third round; Walters gave Crewe a first-half lead at Stamford Bridge before Chelsea equalised in the 82nd minute to force a replay, which they won 2–0. In March 1990, Crewe defender Paul Edwards was sold to Coventry City for £350,000; he was later named in the 1989-1990 Third Division PFA Team of the Year, Crewe's first player to feature in the awards.

Crewe were relegated in 1991. However, despite further player sales―defender Rob Jones joined Liverpool for £300,000, then Craig Hignett was sold for a club record £500,000 to Middlesbrough―the club reached the 1993 Third Division play-off final but lost against York City at Wembley. Crewe then gained promotion in 1994 after a final day victory at Chester City. In the same year, Neil Lennon became the first Crewe player to win an international cap since Fred Keenor in 1932 when he was selected to play for Northern Ireland against Mexico. Crewe twice lost in play-off semi-finals, to Bristol Rovers in 1995 and Notts County in 1996, then returned to Wembley in the 1997 Division Two play-off final, securing a 1–0 victory over Brentford to put the club back in the second tier for the first time since 1896.

==== Second tier survival ====
Crewe achieved their highest finishing position, 11th, in the 1997–98 First Division season. Gradi kept his team in the division until 2002, despite a matchday income on which many more lowly clubs could not survive. Boosting the finances, notable player sales included Lennon (to Leicester City for £750,000), Danny Murphy (to Liverpool for an initial fee of £1.5m), and Seth Johnson (to Derby County for £3m). Gradi celebrated his 1,000th game in charge of Crewe on 20 November 2001.

After one season in the Division Two the team were promoted back to Division One at the end of the 2002–03 season, having finished in second place—Crewe's first runner-up position—with Rob Hulse scoring 22 league goals, and being named in the PFA Team of the Year, ahead of a £750,000 transfer to West Bromwich Albion. Crewe retained their Division One place in the 2003–04 season, during which assistant manager Neil Baker took temporary charge between 22 September and 17 October 2003 while Gradi underwent heart surgery. At the start of the 2004–05 season, Crewe were rated one of the teams most likely to be relegated from the newly renamed 'Championship'. In the event, they put in a good showing in the first half of the season, but after selling Dean Ashton to Norwich City for £3 million in the January 2005 transfer window, Crewe failed to win until the final match of the season, when they defeated Coventry City 2–1 to avoid relegation on goal difference. However, they were relegated to League One (level three) the following season. Nonetheless, Crewe were named the "Most Admired Club" in the 2006 Football League Awards.

==== Stepping back ====
By the summer of 2007, Gradi was the longest-serving manager in English league football, having completed 24 years in sole charge of the club. Crewe announced that, from 1 July 2007, Gradi would take up a new role as the club's technical director while gradually allowing newly appointed first-team coach Steve Holland control of the team. Holland's first season was a disappointment as the club narrowly avoided relegation, finishing 20th with 50 points. Ahead of his second season, he spent half a million pounds on new signings, while striker Nicky Maynard joined Bristol City for £2.25 million. However, despite a positive pre-season, Crewe took only nine points from their first 16 games. The board sacked Holland as first team coach in November 2008, and re-appointed Gradi as caretaker manager.

On 24 December 2008, former Stoke City manager Gudjon Thordarson was appointed as Holland's successor. He made a promising start, and received the February 2009 Manager of the Month award (the first Crewe manager to win the award), but the team suffered a poor end-of-season run, not winning for 10 games, and were relegated to League Two. On 2 October 2009, after nine months in charge and another poor run of results, Thordarson was sacked, and Gradi was reinstated as caretaker manager. Despite lingering close to the playoff places for the majority of the season, another run of poor form saw the club finish 18th. Crewe improved to 10th in the 2010–11 season, during which Gradi won the January 2011 Manager of the Month. In November 2011, Gradi finally stepped down as manager and returned to his previous role as director of football focusing on youth development.

=== 2011 to present day ===
Steve Davis was appointed manager in the same month. Previously manager of nearby Nantwich Town, Davis had been appointed assistant manager in June 2009, replacing former assistant Neil Baker. Davis immediately led the team to a 16-match unbeaten run in early 2012 up to 7th position, earning the club a play-off place. Crewe defeated Southend United in the two-legged semi-final, extending the unbeaten run to a club record 18 matches and securing a play-off final against Cheltenham Town at Wembley on 27 May 2012 which they won 2–0; the goalscorers were academy graduates Nick Powell and Byron Moore.

Before the 2012–13 season, Crewe sold Powell to Manchester United, and on transfer deadline day captain Ashley Westwood joined Aston Villa. However, with new academy players coming into the first team, Crewe returned to Wembley to win the Football League Trophy, beating Southend United 2–0 in the final in April 2013. In the league, Crewe finished in mid-table; they ended the season by fielding a team whose starting line-up were all Crewe Academy graduates.

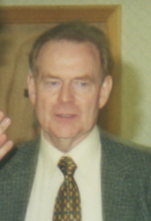
John Bowler in 2000. He served as chairman from 1988 until resigning in March 2021 following criticisms in the FA's sex abuse inquiry.

In March 2014, John Bowler, Crewe chairman since 1988, (Note: Different sources give varying dates (some suggest 1987), however records at Companies House show Rowlinson was chairman in May 1988; Bowler had become chairman by the time the following year's accounts were signed in May 1989.) was honoured with the Contribution to League Football Award at The Football League Awards. Dario Gradi had earlier won the same award, in 2011. In the 2015 New Year Honours, Bowler was awarded an MBE for services to football; Gradi was presented an MBE in January 1998.

Crewe retained their place in League One in the 2013–14 season, but started the following season poorly, gaining four points from the first 11 League games. Some sustained runs of better results pulled the club out of the relegation places. The team needed at least a home draw against Bradford City to secure safety but lost 1–0 and had to rely on results elsewhere to ensure League One football for another year, finishing two points above the bottom four in 20th.

The 2015–16 season started in a similar pattern, with the team winning just two of their first 15 league games. They also crashed out of the FA Cup in the first round against non-league Eastleigh, forcing Davis to defend his position as the 'right man' for the job. Crewe's relegation to League Two was confirmed following a 3–0 defeat at local rivals Port Vale, with five games remaining. After an initially promising start to the following season, Crewe's form slumped in late 2016, and on 8 January 2017, Davis was sacked as Crewe manager.

Former Crewe defender and Academy operations manager David Artell replaced Davis. Artell maintained the flow of academy players and, as Crewe improved to 15th at the end of the 2017–18 season, he emulated Davis in selecting another starting line-up who were all Crewe Academy graduates.

After 36 years involvement with the club, Gradi, 78, announced his retirement from all positions at Crewe Alexandra on 7 October 2019. In February 2020, further changes to the club's board were announced with local businessman Stuart Whitby and former Nantwich Town chairman Tony Davison joining the board following a £1.75m buy-out of majority shareholder Norman Hassall. The Railwaymen Supporters Society also raised £250,000, to earn the right for a Crewe fans' representative on the club's new board.

On the pitch, Artell's progress since 2017 culminated in Crewe vying for promotion for much of the 2019–20 season, with the club top of the table (ahead of Swindon Town on goal difference) when the football season was suspended in March 2020 amid the COVID-19 pandemic. On 9 June, Crewe's promotion to League One was confirmed, but Swindon were crowned League Two champions on the basis of average points per game. Artell was selected as League Two Manager of the Year in the League Managers Association Awards—becoming the first Crewe manager to win such an annual award—and two Academy graduates, Perry Ng and Charlie Kirk, were named in the PFA League Two Team of the Year. Crewe finished 12th in League One at the end of the 2020–21 season – the club's highest finish since relegation from the Championship in 2006.

However, the following season was "one of the worst" seasons in Crewe's modern history; the club was relegated with four games still to play after a 2–0 defeat at Doncaster Rovers on 9 April 2022. Two days later, Crewe parted company with Artell; assistant manager Alex Morris was appointed interim manager, becoming the permanent manager on 28 April 2022. However, just over six month later, on 4 November 2022, Morris, winless in nine games, stepped down as manager for family reasons and reverted to assistant manager. Lee Bell became interim manager and on 1 December 2022 was given the job on a permanent basis.

Bell managed the side to 13th place at the end of the 2022–23 season, improving to 6th place the following season; in the play-offs, they beat Doncaster to reach a fourth play-off final, but lost 2–0 to Crawley Town at Wembley on 19 May 2024. Crewe vied for promotion for much of the 2024–25 season and were in the automatic promotion places until late January, but won just three of their last 18 games to eventually finish 13th again. The next season followed a similar pattern with Crewe in play-off contention before again falling short, finishing 11th. Crewe started the 2026–27 season unbeaten in 11 league games (equalling a club record set in 1953). In a 3–2 League Cup defeat at Barnsley, Joel Ewusi, aged 16 years 79 days, became Crewe's youngest player and scorer.

== Stadiums ==
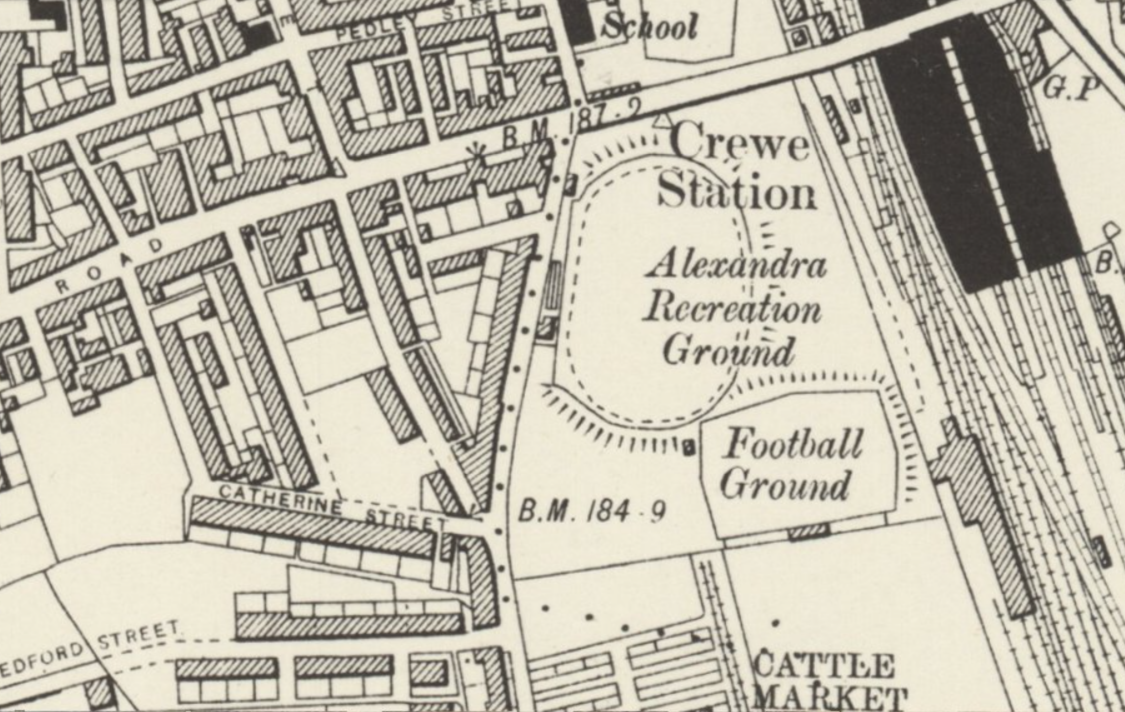
Detail of 1888 OS map showing Crewe Alexandra's first two grounds: the Alexandra Recreation Ground and its adjacent football ground

=== Alexandra Recreation Ground ===
Until 1896, Crewe played at the Alexandra Recreation Ground, located just to the north of the modern-day Gresty Road. After playing at various venues in 1896 and 1897, including in nearby Sandbach, the club returned to the same area of Crewe, adjacent to Crewe railway station, to play at the first Gresty Road ground, located to the south-east of the original stadium, and with a grandstand "capable of accommodating 1,500 persons". In 1906 the ground was demolished to make way for some new railway lines, and a new Gresty Road stadium was built on an adjacent site to the west.

=== Gresty Road ===
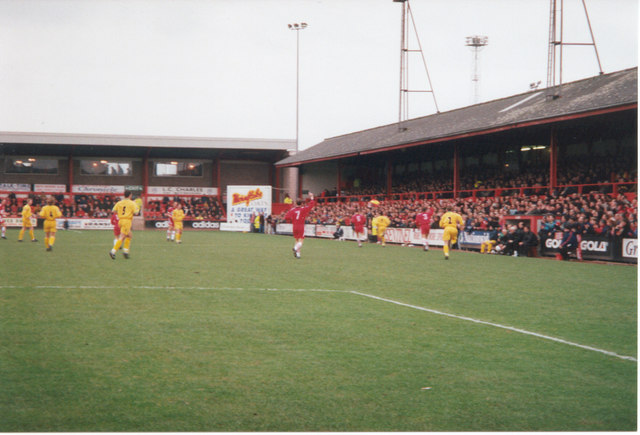
Gresty Road in 1998, looking east towards the Family Stand, with the old main stand on the right

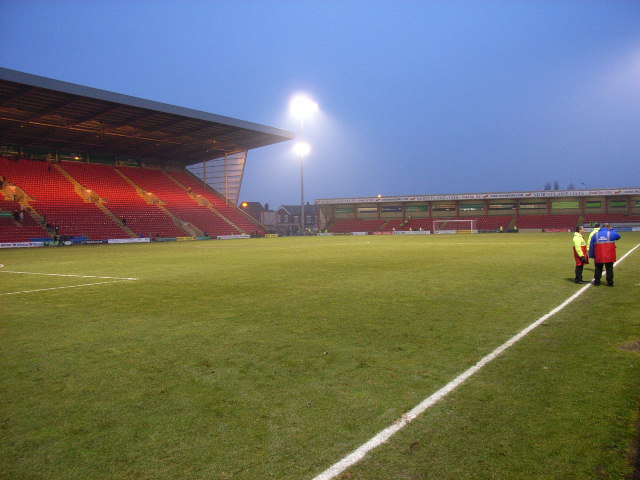
Main stand (left) and Gresty Road End

The pitch runs approximately east to west, with teams playing either west towards Gresty Road or east towards the railway station. The main stand has always been situated on the south side of the ground. Until the 1990s, the main stand was a wooden structure, built in 1932 after a fire destroyed the original stand, offering the ground's only (wooden) seating plus a standing area―'The Paddock'―while the other three sides were all standing terraces. This configuration saw the club's record attendance when 20,000 people watched the FA Cup third round tie against Spurs in 1960.

During the 1990s, phased modernisation saw open terracing at the "Railway End" (at one time a roughly formed "ash bank" terraced with sleepers) replaced by a new family stand in 1993. The "Gresty Road End" (then the main away supporters area) was also replaced by an all-seater stand in 1995; and the partially-covered northern stand (the home supporters' "Pop Side") was replaced by an all-seater stand in 1996–97. Completion of the final phase in 2000, including construction of a new £5.2 million main stand, saw some reorganisation of seating allocations. Away fans are currently accommodated in the stand along the northern touchline, with the option of additional capacity in the family stand for particularly large visiting contingents; Crewe hosted its first crowd of over 10,000 in the now all-seater stadium in 2000 with the record attendance of 10,092 when Crewe played Manchester City on 12 March 2002. The Gresty Road End and main stand are solely for home supporters.

In June 2021, the club agreed a £0.5m naming rights deal with its then long-term shirt sponsor Mornflake; the ground would be called the "Mornflake Stadium"; in December 2023, Mornflake extended their stadium and shirt sponsorship, and in April 2025 it extended its stadium naming rights deal again. Also known as the Alexandra Stadium, it has an all-seated capacity of 10,153. It features four stands:

- The "Boughey Stand", or main stand, seats 6,809 spectators and also has a directors area and media seating, and houses the club's offices, team changing rooms, hospitality facilities, ticket office and club shop.
- The "KPI Recruiting Stand", also known as the "Gresty Road End", accommodates 982 spectators and 4 disabled spectators. A bar for home supporters is situated to the north of this stand.
- "The Andrew Connolly Financial Planning Stand", also known as the "Railway End", accommodates 682 spectators.
- The "Whitby Morrison Ice Cream Van Stand", formerly the "Pop Side", accommodates 1,680 away spectators, and also houses the ground's matchday video filming facilities. In July 2021, Whitby Morrison announced a 99-year extension of its stand sponsorship at Crewe.

Should the ground require expansion, the most likely change will be redevelopment of the Ice Cream Van Stand to become a two-tiered stand. In February 2023, the club announced plans to install 3,000 solar panels above spaces in the car park south of the main (Boughey) stand, with energy to be used to power the stadium or to bring in cash.

== Club identity ==
Since the late 1890s, the main (home) Crewe playing strip has featured a red or predominantly red top, usually with white shorts (though red and black shorts have also been briefly adopted) and red socks. The team played in white shirts and blue shorts from 1886 to 1896, but have since played mainly in red and white. The red shirts earned the early nickname of the "Robins", though the club is more commonly referred to as the "Alex" or the "Railwaymen" (reflecting the club's railway works founders, the town's associations with the railway industry, and the club's proximity to Crewe railway station).

Crewe's away colours have varied. Blue, white or blue-and-white shirts have been the most commonly adopted, but during the 21st century, the club has also occasionally played in other colours; black with a gold trim was adopted for the 2021–2022 season, then light and dark blue vertical stripes the following season.

The town's crest appeared on the team's shirts in the 1958–59 season. This included a lion―associated with the Marquess of Crewe―holding a cogged wheel, a larger six-spoked railway wheel, and two wheatsheaves reflecting south Cheshire's agricultural connections. This was replaced in 1975 by a simpler badge with a lion holding a railway wheel―a motif borrowed from British Rail―on a circle containing the words 'Crewe Alexandra Football Club' arranged around a football. The current badge, adopted in 1998, features a lion perched on a football, encircled by a laurel and the club's name; it dropped the railway wheel, prompting some Crewe fans to demand the club "bring back the wheel". The club's mascot is also a lion: Gresty the Lion appears on matchdays and in other community activities.

The longest-standing shirt sponsor was cereals supplier Mornflake―also based in Gresty Road―whose logo appeared on the shirts from 2005. In December 2023, Mornflake extended their shirt sponsorship, making it the longest continual agreement in the EFL, and October 2024 saw the 1,000th game since Mornflake's shirt sponsorship began. In April 2025, Whitby Morrison was announced as the club's new shirt sponsor, while Mornflake extended their ground naming rights sponsorship.

== Supporters and rivalries ==
=== Attendances ===
Crewe is the third largest town in Cheshire: its built-up area had a total population of 76,437 in 2021. Founded by employees of the railway works, the club drew many of its supporters from the works, as well as residents from more rural areas surrounding the town. The club's location next to Crewe railway station has also helped supporters travel to and from games at Gresty Road. This enables many Alex fans to travel in from various nearby towns, especially in Cheshire and North Shropshire, and also further afield. From the 1920s through to the 1960s, attendances typically averaged around 6,000, but local derbies could more than double crowds: the visit of Stoke City on 26 October 1926 attracted 15,102, for example, while Port Vale drew 17,883 on 21 September 1953, Crewe's record league crowd. Cup matches against major clubs such as Spurs also drew large crowds (a record 20,000 in 1960). However, league attendances dwindled in the 1970s and 1980s, when seasonal averages of under 2,000 were recorded four times, with 1986-87 being lowest: 1,817; just 1,009 watched a 1–1 draw with Peterborough United on 4 February 1986. Crewe's resurgence from the mid-1980s under Gradi boosted local interest, with 5,000-plus attendances increasingly common, even as Gresty Road's transition to an all-seater stadium began to restrict numbers in the late 1990s; average attendance peaked at 7,741 in 2004 during Crewe's years in the Championship. League Two crowds before the COVID-19 pandemic shutdown in 2020 averaged 4,580, just below their all-time average, 4,583. Crewe's average home attendance in the 2025–2026 season was 5,693.

Ticket prices at Gresty Road are broadly in line with other clubs' rates for all-seated areas. In the BBC's 2017 Price of Football survey, Crewe's tickets for individual League Two games cost a maximum of £22 (15 other clubs charged higher prices); the most expensive Crewe season ticket cost £325 (only one other club, Accrington Stanley, charged less for its most expensive season tickets), and its lowest priced season ticket (£280) was in the mid-range for the division. For the 2021–2022 season in League One, matchday tickets cost a maximum of £25.

=== Rivalries ===
Crewe's main rivals are fellow English Football League team Port Vale. As of September 2026, the clubs have played 86 games since 1892 (8 games against Burslem Port Vale); overall, Crewe have won 20 games, Port Vale have won 41, with the teams drawing 25 games. The rivalry (known by some since the 1980s as the A500 Derby) intensified after the millennium, when both clubs were in Leagues One and Two, with close encounters sometimes resulting in violence and arrests. In January 2015 at Vale Park, Crewe won 1–0 to seal their first league double over Port Vale, and two arrests were made at the game, with minor disturbances between rival fans after the match. Six arrests were made at Gresty Road during the 22 September 2018 meeting between the two sides. A 2019 study ranked the Port Vale-Crewe Alexandra rivalry as the 14th biggest rivalry in English professional football.

Crewe also maintain smaller rivalries with Wrexham, Salford City, Shrewsbury Town, Stoke City and traditional local Cheshire derbies with Macclesfield, Chester City, Stockport County and Tranmere Rovers. The Railwaymen's rivalry with Stockport intensified somewhat in 2009 when Stockport all but relegated Crewe from League One, after beating them 4–3 at Edgeley Park. Crewe then returned the favour on 30 April 2011, when they beat County 2–0 at Gresty Road, confirming County's relegation to non-League football.

=== Songs and music ===
In the 1950s, Crewe's fans were the first to sing the song "Blue Moon"―also sung by fans of Manchester City―(with lyrics that do not quite match the Rodgers and Hart original) and said to be a response to the gloomy days of the 1950s and 1960s, or reflecting an old joke that the team only wins 'once in a blue moon', i.e., rarely. During the 1990s, one Crewe supporter, classically trained musician Richard Sutton, was known for taking a trumpet to games, playing occasional fanfares such as the theme from Star Wars during matches. The Crewe-based dance trio Dario G were named after Dario Gradi.

=== Railwaymen Supporters Society ===
Crewe supporters often sing a song featuring the line "We are the Railwaymen". Aggregating and formalising several former Crewe supporters groups, and supported by the national Football Supporters' Association, the independent Railwaymen Supporters Society was established in 2018, and incorporated as a community benefit society on 8 July 2019. Initiatives have included a campaign, Project250, to raise £250,000 to invest in club shares and gain representation on the club's board (achieved in February 2020), and the establishment of an Ex-Players Association (Gareth Whalley is its president).

== Reputation ==
=== Player development ===
As an early professional club in the late 19th century, several Crewe players achieved international selection, particularly for Wales. During the 20th century, however, Crewe had few stars. Welsh international Fred Keenor played his final league games for the club and his last international cap in 1932 was Crewe's first of the century. Some players started or developed their careers at Crewe before achieving fame elsewhere. For example, forward Frank Blunstone played 48 League games for Crewe in the early 1950s before a move to Chelsea and five England caps, Stan Bowles scored 18 Crewe goals in 51 games in the early 1970s and went on to play for Queens Park Rangers and England, and goalkeeper Bruce Grobbelaar played 24 Crewe matches at the start of the 1980s before moving to Liverpool.

Crewe's conscious investment in young players began in the late 1980s when then manager Dario Gradi and club chairman John Bowler got the local council to contribute towards the costs of an all-weather pitch at Gresty Road. This formed the starting point for a youth coaching facility, which by the early 1990s was coaching 120 youngsters every week. In 1995, Crewe leased a 20-acre site at Reaseheath, near Nantwich, planning a £750,000 training and player development facility largely funded by transfer sales. In 1996, Crewe received a lottery grant to develop a youth coaching facility in nearby Shavington. By 2015, player sales had generated over £20 million which had contributed to modernising Gresty Road and developing Crewe's Academy, making it the only club outside the top two divisions to have a Category Two academy club; in 2022, it was ranked in the top 10 academies in England and Wales. In 2026, it transitioned to a Category Three academy.

Players who passed through the ranks since establishment of the academy include England internationals Geoff Thomas and David Platt, Wales international Robbie Savage, and Northern Ireland's Neil Lennon and Steve Jones. These were all youngsters signed from other clubs, but the academy also nurtured Crewe's own trainees – most notably England internationals Rob Jones, Danny Murphy, Seth Johnson and Dean Ashton, plus Wales midfielder David Vaughan.

=== Sexual abuse scandal ===
On 16 November 2016, former Crewe defender Andy Woodward revealed that he had been the victim of child sexual abuse by former football coach Barry Bennell (convicted as a paedophile in the US in 1994) at the club in the 1980s. By the time club chairman John Bowler responded to the revelations, on Monday 21 November, six other individuals had contacted the police, with Woodward's Crewe teammate Steve Walters alleging he was another of Bennell's victims. Woodward criticised Crewe for failing to apologise. On 27 November 2016, a third former Crewe player, Anthony Hughes, revealed that he too had been abused by Bennell, as did Crewe trainee, later Wimbledon and Northern Ireland international Mark Williams.

Bennell was tried at Liverpool Crown Court in early 2018, and convicted of 50 offences of sexual abuse against 12 boys (and on 20 February 2018 was sentenced to 30 years in prison). After the guilty verdicts on 15 February, victims including Andy Woodward and Steve Walters read statements outside court. Crewe Alexandra expressed its "deepest sympathies" to Bennell's victims, saying it was not aware of any sexual abuse by Bennell nor had it received any complaint about sexual abuse by him before or during his employment with the club, though this has been disputed.

Walters accused Crewe of "victim blaming" in a bid to avoid compensation payouts. He and at least one other former Crewe player launched High Court damages claims of upwards of £200,000 against the club; an eight-week trial was listed to start in October 2021. On 19 March 2019, the Guardian reported Crewe Alexandra planned to contest victims' claims, but later (27 March 2019), reported an apparent U-turn in Crewe's approach; it had agreed an out-of-court financial settlement with one of Bennell's victims. Woodward had unsuccessfully sued Crewe for damages in 2004.

Crewe were additionally criticised for not holding an independent review into how they dealt with historical child sex abuse allegations. The club advised in March 2018 that it had fully co-operated with police investigations, did "not intend to commission a further independent investigation," and the police's report had also been supplied to the FA review headed by Clive Sheldon. This decision was criticised by local MP Laura Smith, by MP Damian Collins, chair of the DCMS select committee, by Crewe Town Council, and by the Professional Footballers Association's Gordon Taylor. In his final report, Sheldon said he "liaised with the Club and its lawyers with a view to suggesting other lines of enquiry that could usefully be followed up by the Club. Ultimately, the Club agreed to conduct those further enquiries, and provided me with a report setting out its conclusions."

The FA's 710-page report, published on 17 March 2021, identified failures to act adequately on complaints or rumours of sexual abuse at eight professional clubs including Crewe. Considering whether senior Crewe people knew about Bennell, Sheldon concluded they had not received specific reports of abuse. However, directors had discussed concerns about inappropriate behaviour, and the club "should have done more to check on the well-being of the boys". Following publication of the report, Crewe Alexandra apologised to all survivors of Bennell's abuse, expressing "wholehearted regret" about their ignorance of his crimes, and Gradi also apologised. With Gradi "effectively banned for life" from football for safeguarding reasons, Crewe chairman John Bowler was pressed to resign and did so on 25 March 2021. Awarded an MBE in 1998, Gradi was stripped of the award in August 2023 following a professional disbarment for failing to protect children from sexual abuse.

== Records ==
Crewe's biggest league victory came against Rotherham United on 1 October 1932 in the Third Division North when they won 8–0. In the FA Cup, their biggest win was 9–1 over Northwich Victoria on 16 November 1889. The club's heaviest defeat was in the FA Cup in 1960 when they were beaten 13–2 by Tottenham Hotspur at White Hart Lane on 30 January 1960, a game watched by 64,365: the largest crowd for a match involving Crewe. In the league, Crewe's worst performance saw them beaten 11–1 at Lincoln City on 29 September 1951 in the Third Division North.

Tommy Lowry made the most first team appearances in all competitions for Crewe: 482 between 1965 and 1977. Bert Swindells holds the record for most Crewe goals: 128, scored from 1927 to 1937, while Terry Harkin scored the most Crewe goals in a single season: 34 in 1964–65. Best match return was five goals, scored by Tony Naylor in Crewe's 7–1 league defeat of Colchester United at Gresty Road on 24 April 1993.

William Bell was the first Crewe player to win an international cap, playing for Wales against Ireland in Wrexham in February 1886. Clayton Ince, with 31 caps for Trinidad and Tobago, has won most caps while playing for Crewe. Efe Sodje is the only Crewe player to play in a World Cup Finals tournament, for Nigeria against Argentina, on 2 June 2002, and then against England on 12 June 2002, both in Japan.

Crewe's most expensive player was Rodney Jack, signed from Torquay United in August 1998 for £650,000. Crewe were reported to have received £3 million for Nick Powell when he moved to Manchester United on 2 July 2012, with options for the fee to grow to £6 million depending on appearances. Crewe also received £3 million for Seth Johnson's 1999 move to Derby County, and for Dean Ashton's move to Norwich City in 2005.

== Players ==
=== Current squad ===
As of 21 August 2026

Note: Flags indicate national team as defined under FIFA eligibility rules; some limited exceptions apply. Players may hold more than one non-FIFA nationality.

No.	Pos.	Nation	Player
1	GK	ENG	Tom Booth
2	DF	ENG	Lewis Billington
3	DF	ENG	Reece Hutchinson
4	MF	SCO	Kyle Ure (on loan from Celtic)
5	DF	ENG	Mickey Demetriou (captain)
6	DF	ENG	Luke Offord
7	MF	ENG	Jack Lankester
8	MF	ENG	Conor Thomas
9	FW	ENG	Josh March
10	MF	ENG	Joe White
11	MF	ENG	Joel Tabiner
12	DF	ENG	Josh Stephenson (on loan from Brentford)
13	GK	IRL	Ian Lawlor
14	FW	ENG	Jordan Gibson

No.	Pos.	Nation	Player
17	MF	SVK	Matúš Holíček
19	MF	ENG	Owen Lunt
20	MF	WAL	Calum Agius
22	DF	ENG	Phil Croker
23	FW	ENG	Charlie McNeill (on loan from Sheffield Wednesday)
27	FW	WAL	Patrick Mlynarski
29	FW	IRL	Adrien Thibaut
30	DF	WAL	Stan Dancey
31	GK	ENG	Luke Unsworth
32	MF	ENG	Luca Moore
33	MF	WAL	Owen Hayden-Taylor
35	FW	ENG	Noah Bell
36	MF	ENG	Joel Ewusi

==== Out on loan ====
Note: Flags indicate national team as defined under FIFA eligibility rules; some limited exceptions apply. Players may hold more than one non-FIFA nationality.

No.	Pos.	Nation	Player
15	FW	ENG	Dion Rankine (on loan at Eastleigh)
21	FW	ENG	Fin Roberts (on loan at Brackley Town)

=== Former players ===
In 2004 the BBC's Football Focus asked fans of all professional football clubs in England and Scotland to vote for their cult hero. For Crewe, Seth Johnson won with 59% of the vote; Danny Murphy came second with 33%, and Craig Hignett third with 8%.

=== Full international players ===
William Bell was the first Crewe player to win an international cap, playing for Wales against Ireland in Wrexham in February 1886. On 15 March 1890, three Crewe players – Alfred Davies (also Wales captain), Dick Jones and Billy Lewis – played in Wales's 3–1 defeat by England in Wrexham; Lewis scored Wales's goal, the first international goal scored by a Crewe player. John 'Jackie' Pearson became the first Crewe player to win an international cap for England, playing against Ireland in Belfast on 5 March 1892. He remains the only Crewe player capped for England while playing at the club. Donervon Daniels was the most recent permanent Crewe player to win a full international cap; he played for Montserrat in their FIFA World Cup 2022 qualifier against US Virgin Islands on 2 June 2021. While on loan at Crewe, Jamie Knight-Lebel made his senior international debut for Canada in a CONCACAF Nations League match against Suriname on 19 November 2024.

Player		Country	Caps	Goals	Years of caps	Notes
Clayton Ince	(Trinidad and Tobago)	Trinidad and Tobago	36	0	1999–2005	
Steve Jones	(Northern Ireland)	Northern Ireland	22	1	2003–2006	
Marcus Haber	(Canada)	Canada	13	1	2014–2016	
David Vaughan	(Wales)	Wales	13	0	2003–2007	
Efe Sodje	(Nigeria)	Nigeria	8	1	2000–2003	
Rodney Jack	(Saint Vincent and the Grenadines)	Saint Vincent and the Grenadines	6	4	2000	
Neil Lennon	(Northern Ireland)	Northern Ireland	6	0	1994–1995	
Billy Lewis	(Wales)	Wales	6	1	1890–1892	
Michael O'Connor	(Northern Ireland)	Northern Ireland	6	0	2008–2009	
William Bell	(Wales)	Wales	3	0	1886	
Colin Murdock	(Northern Ireland)	Northern Ireland	3	0	2005	
Robbie Savage	(Wales)	Wales	3	0	1995–1996	
Mathias Pogba	(Guinea)	Guinea	2	0	2013	
Trevor Owen	(Wales)	Wales	2	0	1893	
Edwin Williams	(Wales)	Wales	2	0	1893	
Madjid Bougherra	(Algeria)	Algeria	1	0	2006	
Donervon Daniels	(Montserrat)	Montserrat	1	0	2021	
Alfred Davies	(Wales)	Wales	1	0	1890	
Dick Jones	(Wales)	Wales	1	0	1890	
Fred Keenor	(Wales)	Wales	1	0	1932	
Jamie Knight-Lebel	(Canada)	Canada	1	0	2024	
Ben Lewis	(Wales)	Wales	1	1	1892	
John Pearson	(England)	England	1	0	1892	
Robert Roberts	(Wales)	Wales	1	0	1893	

== Management ==
=== Managerial history ===
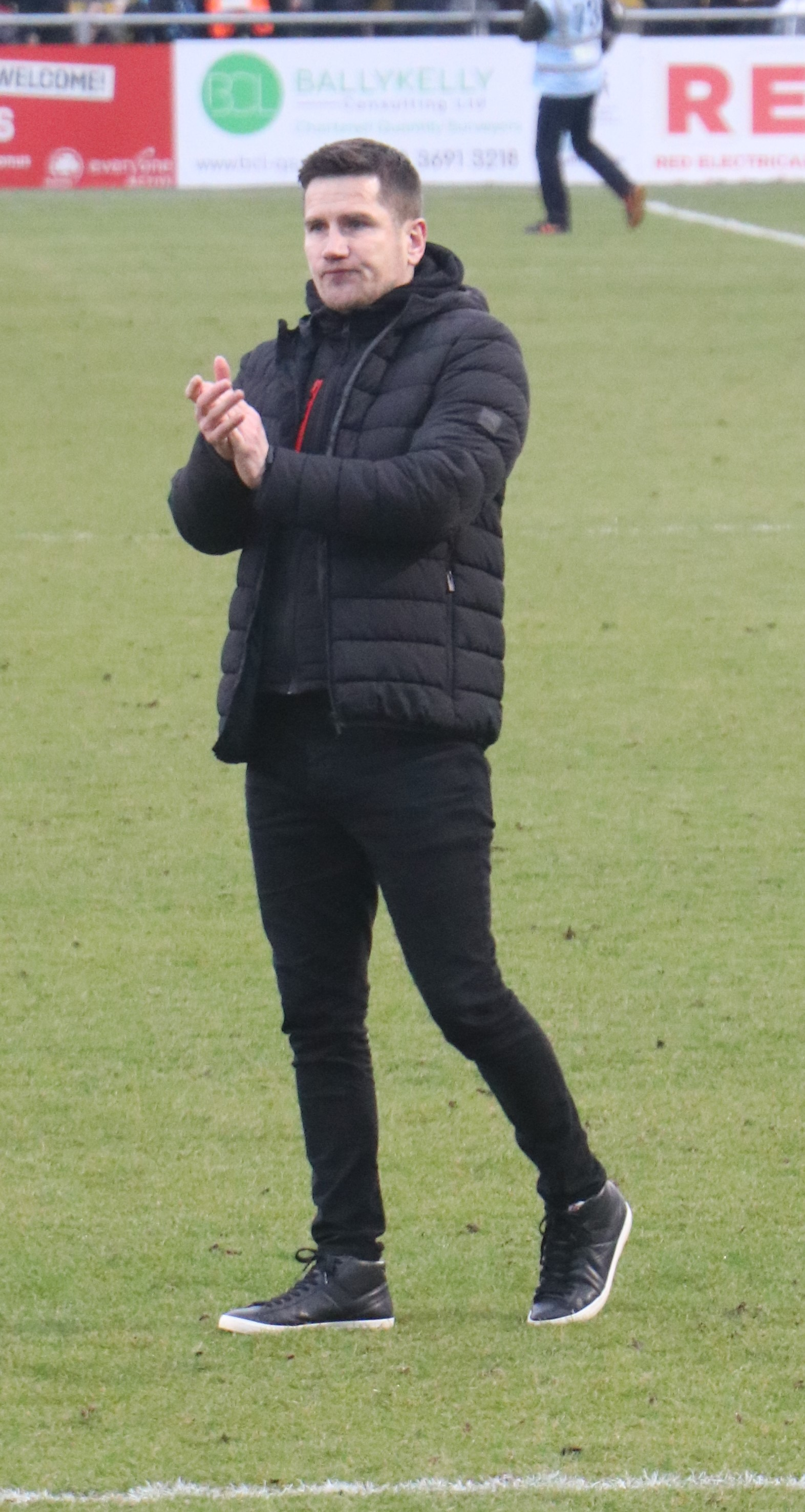
Lee Bell, current manager of Crewe Alexandra, applauding travelling supporters at Sutton United on 4 March 2023.

Since 1892, 29 men have managed Crewe. Dario Gradi holds the record for the most games: 1,359 first team games. Two Crewe managers have been inducted into the English Football Hall of Fame: Gradi in 2004 and Harry Catterick, posthumously, in 2010.

As of 22 November 2026. Only competitive matches are counted.

Name	Nat	From	To	Record				
Name	Nat	From	To	P	W	D	L	Win %
W.C. McNeill^{1}	(England)	August 1892	May 1894	50	12	10	28	24.00
J.G. Hall^{1}	(England)	August 1895	May 1896	31	5	3	23	16.13
Robert Roberts^{1}	(Wales)	January 1897	December 1897	0	0	0	0	—
John Blomerley^{2}	(England)	January 1898	May 1925	169	56	44	69	33.14
Tom Bailey^{1}	(England)	August 1925	May 1938	578	223	113	242	38.58
George Lillycrop	(England)	August 1938	July 1944	45	20	7	18	44.44
Frank Hill	(Scotland)	July 1944	October 1948	102	45	19	38	44.12
Arthur Turner	(England)	October 1948	December 1951	149	56	39	54	37.58
Harry Catterick	(England)	December 1951	June 1953	74	31	11	32	41.89
Ralph Ward	(England)	June 1953	May 1955	96	25	28	43	26.04
Maurice Lindley	(England)	August 1955	May 1958	143	23	28	92	16.08
Harry Ware	(England)	August 1958	May 1960	100	36	22	42	36.00
Jimmy McGuigan	(England)	June 1960	November 1964	222	87	85	50	39.19
Ernie Tagg	(England)	November 1964	October 1970	273	105	69	99	38.46
Tom McAnearney	(Scotland)	October 1970	July 1971	39	15	9	15	38.46
Dennis Viollet	(England)	August 1971	November 1971	15	4	2	9	26.67
Jimmy Melia	(England)	May 1972	December 1973	70	16	23	31	22.86
Ernie Tagg	(England)	January 1974	December 1974	48	13	12	23	27.08
Harry Gregg	(Northern Ireland)	January 1975	May 1978	163	53	53	57	32.52
Warwick Rimmer	(England)	August 1978	May 1979	46	6	14	26	13.04
Tony Waddington	(England)	June 1979	July 1981	93	24	27	42	25.81
Arfon Griffiths	(Wales)	August 1981	October 1982	59	9	10	40	15.25
Peter Morris	(England)	November 1982	June 1983	33	8	7	18	24.24
Dario Gradi^{3}	(England)	June 1983	July 2007	1,241	464	476	301	37.39
Dario Gradi^{4} / Steve Holland^{5}	(England) / (England)	July 2007	November 2008	72	19	16	37	26.39
Dario Gradi^{6}	(England)	November 2008	December 2008	8	3	1	4	37.50
Gudjon Thordarson	(Iceland)	December 2008	October 2009	37	12	7	18	32.43
Dario Gradi^{6}	(England)	October 2009	November 2011	110	38	23	49	34.55
Steve Davis	(England)	November 2011	January 2017	272	84	71	117	30.88
David Artell	(Gibraltar)	January 2017	April 2022	274	100	51	123	36.50
Alex Morris	(England)	April 2022	November 2022	24	5	9	10	20.83
Lee Bell	(England)	November 2022	present	215	80	64	71	37.21

^{1}As secretary-manager
^{2}A railway clerk, John Bradburn Blomerley (also among the club's first directors in 1899, and, in 1902, chairman of the Cheshire F.A.) was secretary-manager to 1911; honorary secretary to 1925
^{3}As sole manager. Between 22 September and 17 October 2003, Gradi underwent heart surgery. Assistant manager Neil Baker took charge of the team for this period (P6, W0, D1, L5).
^{4}As technical director
^{5}As first team coach
^{6}As caretaker manager

=== Coaching positions ===
As of 17 April 2026.

Name	Nationality	Role
Lee Bell	England	Manager
Ryan Dicker	British Virgin Islands	Assistant manager
Fred Barber	England	Goalkeeping coach
Kenny Lunt	England	Player development manager
David Vaughan	Wales	U18 manager
Sam Pettit	England	U18 assistant manager
Aidan Callan	England	Academy manager
Josh Kennard	England	Technical Director

== Honours ==
League

- Second Division (level 3) (Note: Upon its formation in 1992, the Premier League became the top tier of English football; the Football League First, Second and Third Divisions then became the second, third and fourth tiers, respectively. From 2004, the First Division became the Championship, the Second Division became League One and the Third Division became League Two.)
  - 2nd place promotion: 2002–03
  - Play-off winners: 1997
- Fourth Division / Third Division / League Two (level 4)
  - 2nd place promotion: 2019–20
  - 3rd place promotion: 1962–63, 1993–94
  - 4th place promotion: 1967–68, 1988–89
  - Play-off winners: 2012

Cup

- Football League Trophy
  - Winners: 2012–13
- Welsh Cup
  - Winners: 1935–36, 1936–37

Crewe Alexandra have never won a division title, and have only been division runners-up twice. In addition to play-off promotions, the club also achieved four promotions, all from the fourth tier, by third-place finishes in 1962–63 and 1993–94 and by fourth-place finishes in 1967–68 and 1988–89. Crewe's highest finishing league position was 11th in the second tier, the First Division in 1997–98.

In the major cup competitions, Crewe reached the semi-finals of the FA Cup in 1888; since then, they have twice reached the 5th round (losing against West Ham United in February 1991, and taking Everton to a replay in February 2002). Crewe have reached the third round of the League Cup ten times (1960, 1974, 1975, 1978, 1992, 1999, 2001, 2004, 2006, 2008), losing 1–0 to Aston Villa in a replay at Villa Park in 1974, and taking cup holders Manchester United into extra time at Gresty Road in 2006 before losing 2–1.

While Crewe is not in Wales, English clubs, usually from border areas, have participated by invitation in the Welsh Cup, which Crewe won twice, in 1936 and 1937. The club has won the Cheshire Senior Cup 16 times, most recently in April 2026.

== Notes and references ==
=== Sources ===
- Crisp, Marco (1998). Crewe Alexandra Match by Match (2nd ed.). Nottingham: Tony Brown. ISBN 1-899468-81-1.
- Hornbrook, Jules (2000). The Gradi Years. Crewe. ISBN 0953887707.
- Morris, Charlie (2019). Generation Game. Goldford. ISBN 978-1-9160314-0-1.
- Smith, Paul; Smith, Shirley (2005). The Ultimate Directory of English and Scottish Football League Grounds, Second edition 1888-2005. Yore Publications. ISBN 0-9547830-4-2.
