= Sturridge =

Sturridge is an English surname. Notable people with the surname include:

== Film and television ==
- Charles Sturridge (born 1951), English screenwriter, producer and director
- Matilda Sturridge (born 1988), English actress
- Tom Sturridge (born 1985), English actor

== Football ==
- Daniel Sturridge (born 1989), English footballer, plays for Perth Glory
- Dean Sturridge (born 1973), English former footballer, mostly played for Derby and Wolves
- Mike Sturridge (born 1962), English former footballer, played briefly for Wrexham
- Simon Sturridge (born 1969), English former footballer, mostly played for Birmingham and Stoke
