= 2012–13 Chelsea F.C. season =

English football club season

Chelsea
2012–13 season
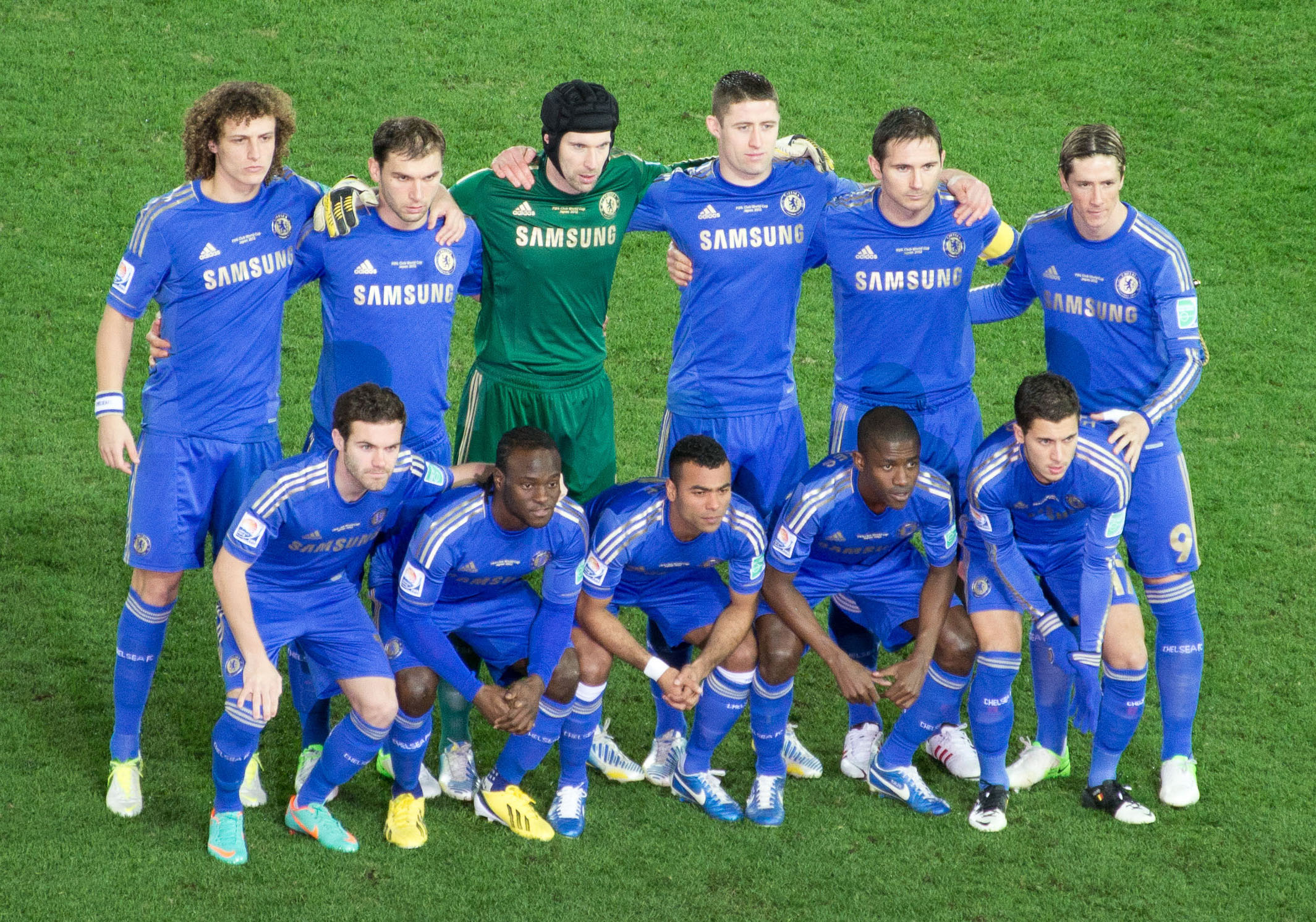
- Chelsea players before 2012 FIFA Club World Cup final against Corinthians
- Owner: Roman Abramovich
- Chairman: Bruce Buck
- Manager: Roberto Di Matteo (until 21 November 2012); Rafael Benítez (interim manager)
- Stadium: Stamford Bridge
- Premier League: 3rd
- FA Cup: Semi-finals
- League Cup: Semi-finals
- FA Community Shield: Runners-up
- UEFA Champions League: Group stage
- UEFA Europa League: Winners
- UEFA Super Cup: Runners-up
- FIFA Club World Cup: Runners-up
- Top goalscorer: League: Frank Lampard (15); All: Fernando Torres (23)
- Highest home attendance: 41,794 vs Everton (19 May 2013, Premier League)
- Lowest home attendance: 28,817 vs Steaua București (14 March 2013, Europa League)
- Average home league attendance: 41,462 (Premier League)
Home colours	Away colours	Third colours

The 2012–13 season was Chelsea Football Club's 99th competitive season, 24th consecutive season in the top flight of English football, 21st consecutive season in the Premier League, and 107th year in existence as a football club. Chelsea's victory in the 2011–12 UEFA Champions League for the first time in their history qualified them for the season's UEFA Super Cup and FIFA Club World Cup, although through finishing third in their Champions League group Chelsea competed in the UEFA Europa League for the first time since the 2002–03 season – then known as the UEFA Cup.

== Season summary ==
On 13 June 2012, Roberto Di Matteo signed a two-year contract, becoming Chelsea's permanent manager, having been appointed as interim manager after the sacking of André Villas-Boas during the 2011–12 season. However, on 21 November 2012, Di Matteo was sacked after a 3–0 loss away to Juventus in the UEFA Champions League, with Rafael Benítez replacing him as interim manager until the end of the season. On 15 May 2013, Chelsea won their first and only silverware of the season, winning the Europa League final against Portuguese side Benfica. They finished the Premier League season in third place.

The season was the first since 2003–04 without Didier Drogba and the first since 2006–07 without Nicolas Anelka, both of whom joined Shanghai Shenhua.

== Kits ==
Supplier: Adidas / Sponsor: Samsung

Home	Home alt.	Away	Away alt. 1	Away alt. 2	Third

Goalkeeper 1	Goalkeeper 2	Goalkeeper alt.	Goalkeeper 3

== Overview ==
Month	G	W	D	L	GF	GA	GD	GFA	GAA	Pts per G	Max Pts	Pts	Pts Diff	BPL Rnk
August	3	3	0	0	8	2	6	2.67	0.67	3	9	9	0	1
September	3	2	1	0	3	1	2	1	0.33	2.33	9	7	2	4
October	3	2	0	1	10	6	4	3.33	2	2	9	6	3	3
November	5	0	4	1	3	4	−1	0.6	0.8	0.8	15	4	11	16
December	5	4	0	1	15	5	10	3	1	2.4	15	12	3	3
January	5	2	2	1	10	6	4	2	1.2	1.6	15	8	7	3
February	3	1	0	2	6	6	0	2	2	1	9	3	6	13
March	3	2	0	1	4	2	2	1.33	0.67	2	9	6	3	5
April	4	3	1	0	9	3	6	2.25	0.75	2.5	12	10	2	2
May	4	3	1	0	7	4	3	1.75	1	2.5	12	10	2	1
Total	38	22	9	7	75	39	36	1.97	1.02	1.97	114	75	39	3

=== June ===
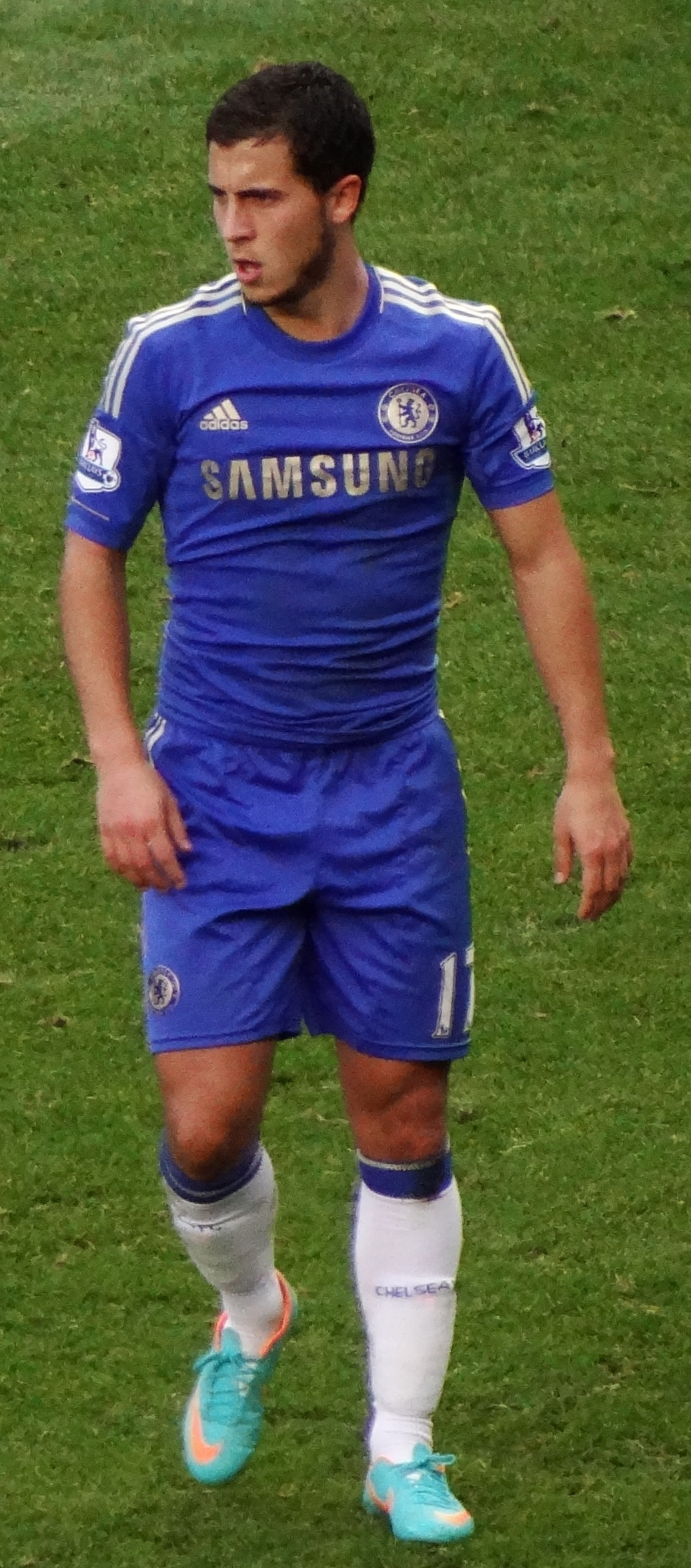
On 4 June Eden Hazard became Chelsea's first signing of the new season, joining for £32 million from Lille.

Excluding players such as Marko Marin, who was signed during the previous season, Chelsea made their first signing of the new campaign on 4 June, signing Belgian international winger Eden Hazard from Lille for an undisclosed fee rumoured to be £32 million. Three days later, the club lost a bid to purchase nearby Battersea Power Station which they considered converting to a stadium and make it their new home ground.

Roberto Di Matteo, who had won the Champions League in the previous season as interim manager, was given a two-year contract as first-team manager on 13 June. On 20 June, Didier Drogba, who scored more than 150 goals for Chelsea in his eight seasons, completed his free transfer to Chinese club Shanghai Shenhua.

=== July ===
At the Westminster Magistrates' Court, John Terry was found not guilty of racially abusing Anton Ferdinand. The district judge concluded "there being a doubt, the only verdict the court can record is one of not guilty." Chelsea announced a "global energy partnership" with Russian energy firm Gazprom in a three-year deal with a value deemed "commercially confidential", which will help reduce the club's deficits under UEFA Financial Fair Play Regulations. On 28 July, the club completed the signing of Brazilian midfielder Oscar from Internacional for a reported £25 million fee.

=== August ===
On 2 August, Kevin De Bruyne was sent on a season-long loan deal to Werder Bremen of the German Bundesliga. Chelsea played their first competitive match of the season in the Community Shield at Villa Park on 12 August, but lost 3–2 to Manchester City and had Branislav Ivanović sent off. The club officially announced the signings of Spanish right-back César Azpilicueta from Marseille and forward Victor Moses from Wigan Athletic on 24 August.

Chelsea's Premier League campaign began on 19 August with a 0–2 victory in an away match against Wigan Athletic. Both goals came in the first ten minutes, the first from Branislav Ivanović and then a Frank Lampard penalty after Eden Hazard was fouled. The Blues won their second match 4–2 against Reading, and made it three wins out of three with a 2–0 win over Newcastle United. Chelsea lost 4–1 to Atlético Madrid in the 2012 UEFA Super Cup, for whom Radamel Falcao scored a hat-trick.

On transfer deadline day, Michael Essien left on a season-long loan deal with Real Madrid, signed by José Mourinho, who had previously signed him for Chelsea. Two more players left Chelsea on season-long loans the same day, as Yossi Benayoun went to West Ham United and Gaël Kakuta joined Dutch club Vitesse Arnhem.

=== September ===
On 3 September Chelsea sold Portuguese midfielder Raul Meireles to Turkish club Fenerbahçe for £8 million, due to Turkey's transfer window closing later than England's. Ryan Bertrand signed a five-year contract to extend his career at Chelsea until the summer of 2017. Chelsea's run of three consecutive league wins from the start of the season ended on 15 September as they drew 0–0 away to Queens Park Rangers. Before the game, Anton Ferdinand refused to shake John Terry's and Ashley Cole's hand in the pre-match handshake.

Chelsea began their defence of the UEFA Champions League on 19 September, at home to Juventus, and went 2–0 up with Oscar's first goals for the club before Juventus equalised. Brazilian defender David Luiz signed a new five-year contract at the club. On 22 September, Ashley Cole was the unlikely hero as Chelsea scored a dramatic late winner to defeat Stoke City at home. Chelsea beat Wolverhampton Wanderers 6–0 in the League Cup, with goals coming from Gary Cahill, Juan Mata, Fernando Torres and first goals for Victor Moses, Oriol Romeu and Ryan Bertrand.

Chelsea captain John Terry was banned for four games and fined £220,000 by the FA for racially abusing QPR defender Anton Ferdinand. On 29 September, Chelsea became the first team of the season to defeat Arsenal at the Emirates Stadium, with a 1–2 victory which put the Blues three points clear at the top after six matches.

=== October ===
Chelsea won for the first time in their 2012–13 Champions League campaign by defeating Danish champions Nordsjælland 0–4 away with goals from Ramires, David Luiz and two from playmaker Juan Mata. On 6 October, Fernando Torres, Frank Lampard, Eden Hazard and Branislav Ivanović scored in Chelsea's 4–1 home victory over Norwich City, before travelling to London rivals Tottenham Hotspur on 20 October for a 2–4 victory, with goals from Gary Cahill, Daniel Sturridge and two from Juan Mata. This was Chelsea's first victory at Tottenham's White Hart Lane since the FA Cup Quarter-Final Replay in 2007.

On 23 October, Chelsea lost their first Champions League match for the season as they lost 2–1 to Shakhtar Donetsk in Ukraine. Both Branislav Ivanović and Fernando Torres were sent off in Chelsea's home Premier League match against Manchester United on 28 October, a game which saw Chelsea go 0–2 down and equalise before a controversially late winner from United's Javier Hernández. Later, Chelsea Lodged an official complaint based on Mikel John Obi claiming the referee Mark Clattenburg had used "inappropriate language." Clattenburg was cleared of the accusations on 22 November. On 31 October, Chelsea defeated Manchester United 5–4 in the fourth round of the League Cup, coming from behind three times to force extra time before goals from Daniel Sturridge and Ramires secured the win for the Blues.

=== November ===
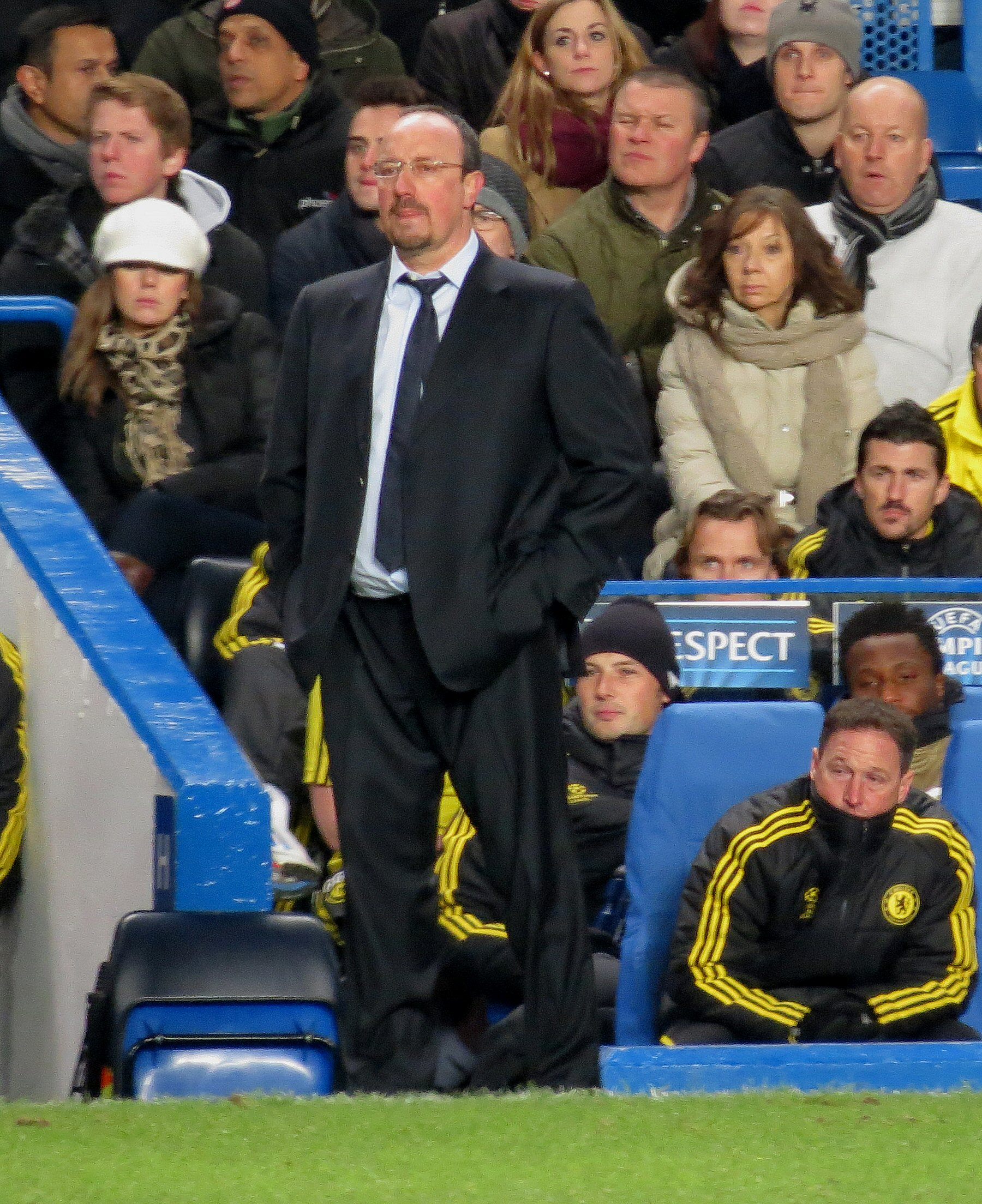
Rafael Benítez was appointed in November as Chelsea's interim coach until the end of the season.

Chelsea playmaker Juan Mata was voted Premier League Player of the Month for October after scoring three goals and contributing three assists. On 3 November, Chelsea fell from first place in the Premier League (held since 25 August) after a 1–1 draw at Swansea City's Liberty Stadium. Chelsea kept up hope of qualifying from their Champions League group by defeating Shakhtar Donetsk 3–2 at home with an injury-time winner from Victor Moses on 7 November. The victory put Chelsea on top of Group E with two games to play. Chelsea then failed to win for their fourth Premier League match in a row after West Bromwich Albion beat them 2–1 away at The Hawthorns on 17 November. The defeat widened the gap between Chelsea and first-place by four points.

Roberto Di Matteo was dismissed from his position on 21 November, the morning after a 3–0 away defeat to Juventus, which put Chelsea at risk of being eliminated from the Champions League, ending a 262-day tenure which saw him win the 2011–12 UEFA Champions League and the 2011–12 FA Cup for Chelsea. On the same day, former Liverpool manager Rafael Benítez was appointed as the club's interim manager until the end of the season. His first act of his tenure was to name Dutchman Boudewijn Zenden, a former Chelsea midfielder who had played under him at Liverpool, as his assistant.

Chelsea midfielder Mikel John Obi was charged with misconduct by the FA after his allegations of racial abuse against referee Mark Clattenburg in the October fixture against Manchester United were found to be baseless. Mikel later received a three-match ban and a £60,000 fine as punishment for his behaviour after the match against Manchester United in October. Benítez's first game in charge was a goalless draw with 2011–12 Premier League winners Manchester City on 25 November. Despite not scoring, Chelsea kept their first clean sheet since the 1–0 win over Stoke City on 22 September. The club's next game, a West London Derby against Fulham, again ended 0–0, leaving Chelsea seven points off the top and six off second place.

=== December ===
On 1 December, Benítez lost for the first time in his Chelsea tenure after Chelsea were beaten 3–1 away to London rivals West Ham United. Three days later, Chelsea confirmed the signing of Brazil under-20 right back Wallace from Rio de Janeiro-based club Fluminense for an undisclosed fee. The option to sign a player from Fluminense was part of the deal that saw former Chelsea midfielder Deco join the team in 2010. On 5 December, it was announced that Mikel John Obi had agreed to extended his Chelsea contract until summer 2017.

On 5 December, Chelsea beat Nordsjælland 6–1 to record their biggest-ever Champions League win and Rafael Benítez's first win as manager, but due to other results, they were eliminated after finishing in third place, becoming the first reigning champions to exit the tournament at the group stage. On 8 December, Chelsea beat Sunderland 1–3 away with Fernando Torres scoring a brace. The victory was Chelsea's first league win in eight matches.

Chelsea entered the 2012 FIFA Club World Cup at the semi-final stage, where they beat CONCACAF champions Monterrey of Mexico 3–1 on 13 December, before losing 1–0 in the final to Corinthians of Brazil in the Yokohama Stadium three days later. Gary Cahill was sent off in injury time for violent conduct towards Corinthians' Emerson.

The club returned to England with a 5–1 home victory in the League Cup against Leeds United on 19 December, coming from a goal down at half-time to reach the semi-finals of the tournament. The club's first Premier League match since the Club World Cup was an 8–0 victory over Aston Villa on 23 December, followed by a 0–1 win at Norwich City's Carrow Road three days later. A third consecutive Premier League victory was confirmed in the last match of 2012, which saw Frank Lampard score twice as Chelsea came from behind to win 1–2 away to Everton on 30 December, ending the Liverpool-based club's unbeaten home season.

=== January ===
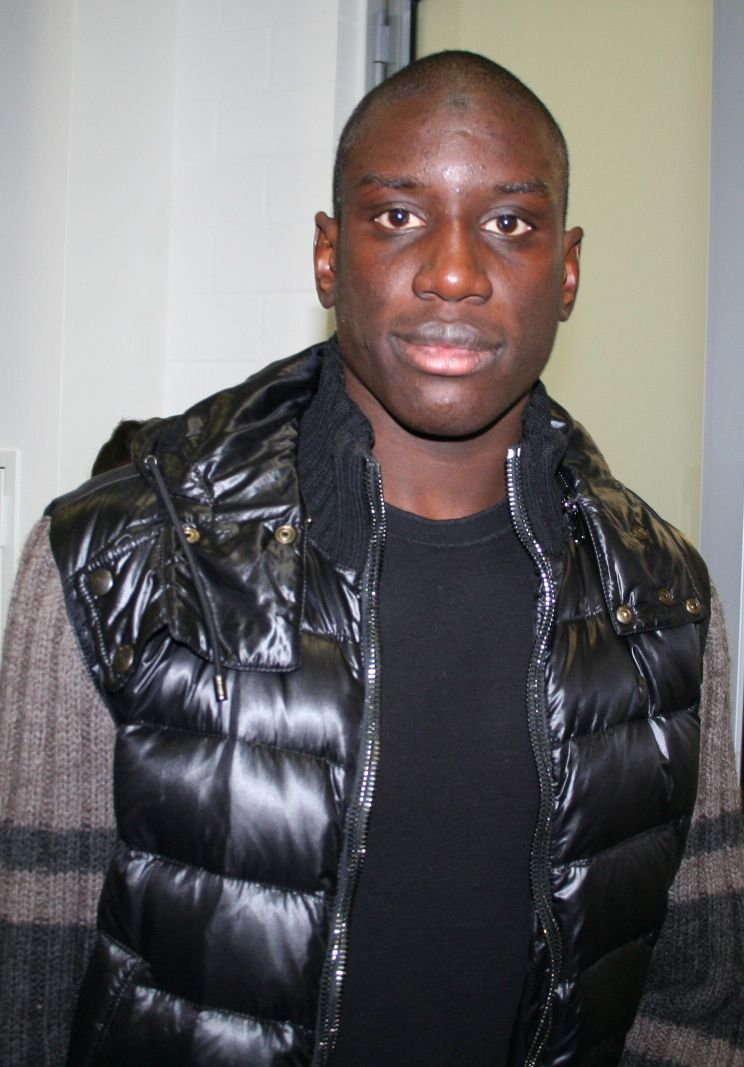
Senegalese forward Demba Ba was signed by Chelsea for £7 million from Newcastle United on 2 January.

Chelsea made their first purchase of the January transfer window on 2 January by triggering the release clause in the contract of Newcastle United's Senegalese forward Demba Ba. Ba, who had scored 13 times in the season for his former club, was signed for £7 million. On the same day, Chelsea sold striker Daniel Sturridge to Liverpool for an undisclosed fee reported to be £12 million. Sturridge played 96 games for Chelsea in three-and-a-half seasons, scoring 24 goals.

The year opened with a 0–1 home defeat to bottom-of-the-table West London rivals QPR, with the goal coming from former Chelsea winger Shaun Wright-Phillips. However, Chelsea made progress in the third round of the FA Cup, where they beat Southampton 1–5 away at St Mary's on 5 January. Ba scored twice on his debut, while Frank Lampard scored his 193rd goal, moving him equal to Kerry Dixon as Chelsea's second-highest goalscorer of all time.

On 9 January, two defensive mistakes from defender Branislav Ivanović caused a 0–2 home loss in the League Cup first semi-final leg tie against Swansea City. In their next Premier League match, on 12 January, Chelsea ended Stoke City's 17-game unbeaten home run by winning 0–4 away. Lampard's converted penalty, his 194th goal, moved him above Dixon's total. However, the following home match against Southampton on 16 January saw Chelsea give away a 2–0 half-time lead, opened by Ba's first Premier League goal, to draw 2–2. The Blues then defeated London rivals Arsenal 2–1 on 20 January, with early goals from Juan Mata and Frank Lampard cutting Chelsea's deficit behind second-place Manchester City to six points.

On 23 January, Chelsea drew the second leg of their League Cup semi-final against Swansea City, which sent Swansea through to the final. Chelsea's Eden Hazard was given a straight red card for an alleged violent attack on a Swansea ballboy.

In the Fourth Round of the FA Cup, on 27 January, Chelsea went behind twice before a late Fernando Torres equaliser forced a replay against fellow West London club Brentford of League One. Chelsea's final Premier League game of the month, played on 30 January, saw them draw 2–2 for a second time in a week, conceding a 0–2 lead in the final three minutes away to Reading. Despite drawing, Frank Lampard's goal in the game made him the first midfielder in Premier League history to score ten or more goals in ten consecutive seasons.

=== February ===
On 2 February, Chelsea lost their first away game since 1 December, losing 3–2 to Newcastle United, for whom Moussa Sissoko scored a late winner. On 6 February, Ashley Cole became the first Chelsea player to earn 100 England caps when he played in a friendly against Brazil at Wembley. On 9 February, Chelsea defeated Wigan Athletic 4–1 to go within four points of second-placed Manchester City, with Marko Marin scoring for the first time. His goal was the club's 100th of the season in all competitions

Chelsea won their first Europa League match since the 2002–03 season on 14 February, beating Sparta Prague 0–1 at the Generali Arena through a late Oscar goal. Three days later, Chelsea triumphed in their FA Cup replay match against Brentford, reaching the fifth round of the FA Cup. In the second leg against Sparta Prague on 21 February, an injury time equaliser from Eden Hazard prevented the game from going to extra time by putting the club through 2–1 on aggregate.

On 24 February, Chelsea lost away to Manchester City, with Frank Lampard missing a second half penalty as the club lost 2–0. In their last game of the month, on 27 February, Chelsea won away in their FA Cup 5th round tie against Middlesbrough with second-half goals from Ramires and Victor Moses.

=== March ===
Chelsea began the month with a 1–0 home win over West Bromwich Albion on 2 March, with Demba Ba scoring the only goal of the match. On 7 March 2013, Chelsea lost the first leg of their last 16 Europa League tie away against Steaua București, with Ryan Bertrand conceding a penalty which was converted as the only goal of the match. In the 6th round of the FA Cup against Manchester United at Old Trafford, Chelsea conceded two early goals before a second half comeback with goals by Ramires and Eden Hazard earned a home replay. Chelsea managed to overturn their Europa League deficit with a 3–1 victory to advance 3–2 on aggregate, in a match in which Fernando Torres scored the winning goal.

=== April ===
April began with the FA Cup replay to Manchester United, winning it 1–0 thanks to a spectacular second half Demba Ba goal. Three days later, the club won their first leg Europa League tie against Russian side Rubin Kazan 3–1 with two goals from Fernando Torres and one from Victor Moses. With their third game in only seven days, Chelsea played Sunderland in the Premier League and came back down from 0–1 to win 2–1, the winner scored by Branislav Ivanović. Chelsea then played the second leg against Rubin Kazan on 11 April, losing 3–2 on the night but winning 5–4 on aggregate, sending them into the semi-finals of the competition. On 14 April, Chelsea met Manchester City in the FA cup semi-finals, where they lost 1–2 and were thus eliminated.

=== May ===
On 11 May, Frank Lampard broke Chelsea's all-time goal-scoring record by scoring two against Aston Villa, earning him his 203rd goal for Chelsea. On 15 May, Chelsea won the Europa League final 1–2 against Benfica. The day after Chelsea won the Europa League, Lampard signed a one-year contract extension with Chelsea. On 19 May, Chelsea ended the season with a 2–1 home-win against Everton, finishing in third place and qualifying for the 2013–14 Champions League.

Chelsea then went to an post-season trip to the United States, where they would meet Manchester City in two friendly matches. Chelsea's first match ended in disappointment as they let slip a three-goal lead at Busch Stadium in St. Louis, Missouri. Rafael Benítez's last game in charge for the Blues ended in a 3–5 defeat to Manchester City at Yankee Stadium in New York City on 25 May. It was also the last game for Paulo Ferreira, who retired after the match, as well as Yossi Benayoun's final match in a Chelsea shirt.

On 26 May, Chelsea announced that they had agreed to play in the inaugural Guinness International Champions Cup in the U.S. – Chelsea will join Milan, Internazionale, Juventus, Real Madrid, Valencia, Everton and the LA Galaxy in the competition. On 28 May, Rafael Benítez was released from his contract with Chelsea to become the new manager of Italian side Napoli.

== Club ==
=== Coaching staff ===
Position	Staff
Manager	(Italy) Roberto Di Matteo (until 21 November 2012)
Interim Manager	(Spain) Rafael Benítez (from 21 November 2012)
Assistant Manager	(England) Steve Holland
Assistant Manager	(England) Eddie Newton (until 21 November 2012)
Assistant Manager	(Netherlands) Boudewijn Zenden (from 22 November 2012)
Technical Director	(Nigeria) Michael Emenalo
Goalkeeper Coach	(France) Christophe Lollichon
First Team Fitness Coaches	(England) Chris Jones
First Team Fitness Coaches	(Spain) Paco de Miguel (from 22 November 2012)
Senior Opposition Scout	(England) Mick McGiven
Medical Director	(Spain) Paco Biosca
First Team Doctor	(Gibraltar) Eva Carneiro
Under 21 Team Manager	(England) Dermot Drummy
Youth Team Manager	(England) Adi Viveash
Academy Manager	(England) Neil Bath
Opposition Analyst	(Spain) Xavi Valero (from 22 November 2012)
Match Analyst	(England) James Melbourne

=== Other information ===
Owner	(Russia) Roman Abramovich
Chairman	(United States) Bruce Buck
Chief Executive	(England) Ron Gourlay
Director	(Ukraine) (Canada) Eugene Tenenbaum
Ground (capacity and dimensions)	Stamford Bridge (41,798 / 103x67 metres)
Training Ground	Cobham Training Centre

== Squads ==
=== First team squad ===
No.	Name	Nationality	Position(s)	Since	Date of birth (age)	Signed from	Games	Goals
Goalkeepers
1	Petr Čech	(Czech Republic)	GK	2004	20 May 1982 (aged 31)	(France) Rennes	432	0
22	Ross Turnbull	(England)	GK	2009	4 January 1985 (aged 28)	(England) Middlesbrough	19	0
40	Henrique Hilário	(Portugal)	GK	2006	21 October 1975 (aged 37)	(Portugal) Nacional	39	0
Defenders
2	Branislav Ivanović	(Serbia)	CB / RB	2008	22 February 1984 (aged 29)	(Russia) Lokomotiv Moscow	219	22
3	Ashley Cole	(England)	LB	2006	20 December 1980 (aged 32)	(England) Arsenal	312	7
4	David Luiz	(Brazil)	CB / DM	2011	22 April 1987 (aged 26)	(Portugal) Benfica	109	12
19	Paulo Ferreira	(Portugal)	RB / LB	2004	18 January 1979 (aged 34)	(Portugal) Porto	217	2
24	Gary Cahill	(England)	CB	2012	19 December 1985 (aged 27)	(England) Bolton Wanderers	64	8
26	John Terry (C)	(England)	CB	1998	7 December 1980 (aged 32)	(England) Chelsea Academy	574	55
28	César Azpilicueta	(Spain)	RB	2012	28 August 1989 (aged 23)	(France) Marseille	48	0
34	Ryan Bertrand	(England)	LB	2006	5 August 1989 (aged 23)	(England) Chelsea Academy	54	2
57	Nathan Aké	(Netherlands)	CB / DM	2012	18 February 1995 (aged 18)	(England) Chelsea Academy	6	0
Midfielders
6	Oriol Romeu	(Spain)	DM / CM	2011	24 September 1991 (aged 21)	(Spain) Barcelona	33	1
7	Ramires	(Brazil)	CM / RM	2010	24 March 1987 (aged 26)	(Portugal) Benfica	150	23
8	Frank Lampard (VC)	(England)	CM	2001	20 June 1978 (aged 34)	(England) West Ham United	608	203
10	Juan Mata	(Spain)	AM / LW / RW	2011	28 April 1988 (aged 25)	(Spain) Valencia	118	32
11	Oscar	(Brazil)	AM / CM	2012	9 September 1991 (aged 21)	(Brazil) Internacional	64	12
12	Mikel John Obi	(Nigeria)	DM / CM	2006	22 April 1987 (aged 26)	(Norway) Lyn	277	2
13	Victor Moses	(Nigeria)	RW / LW / CF	2012	12 December 1990 (aged 22)	(England) Wigan Athletic	43	10
15	Florent Malouda	(France)	LW / CM	2007	13 June 1980 (aged 32)	(France) Lyon	229	45
17	Eden Hazard	(Belgium)	AM / LW / RW	2012	7 January 1991 (aged 22)	(France) Lille	62	13
21	Marko Marin	(Germany)	LW / AM	2012	13 March 1989 (aged 24)	(Germany) Werder Bremen	16	1
30	Yossi Benayoun	(Israel)	LW / AM / RW	2010	5 May 1980 (aged 33)	(England) Liverpool	24	1
Forwards
9	Fernando Torres	(Spain)	ST	2011	20 March 1984 (aged 29)	(England) Liverpool	131	34
29	Demba Ba	(Senegal)	ST	2013	25 May 1985 (aged 27)	(England) Newcastle United	22	6

Stats as of end of season

=== Premier League squad ===
Note: Flags indicate national team as defined under FIFA eligibility rules; some limited exceptions apply. Players may hold more than one non-FIFA nationality.

No.	Pos.	Nation	Player
1	GK	CZE	Petr Čech
2	DF	SRB	Branislav Ivanović
3	DF	ENG	Ashley Cole
4	DF	BRA	David Luiz
6	MF	ESP	Oriol Romeu ^{U21}
7	MF	BRA	Ramires
8	MF	ENG	Frank Lampard ^{HG} (Vice-Captain)
9	FW	ESP	Fernando Torres
10	MF	ESP	Juan Mata
11	MF	BRA	Oscar ^{U21}
12	MF	NGR	Mikel John Obi
13	MF	NGR	Victor Moses
15	MF	FRA	Florent Malouda

No.	Pos.	Nation	Player
17	MF	BEL	Eden Hazard ^{U21}
19	DF	POR	Paulo Ferreira
21	MF	GER	Marko Marin
22	GK	ENG	Ross Turnbull ^{HG}
24	DF	ENG	Gary Cahill
26	DF	ENG	John Terry ^{HG} (Captain)
28	DF	ESP	César Azpilicueta
29	FW	SEN	Demba Ba
30	MF	ISR	Yossi Benayoun
34	DF	ENG	Ryan Bertrand ^{HG}
35	MF	BRA	Lucas Piazon ^{U21}
40	GK	POR	Henrique Hilário
57	DF	NED	Nathan Aké ^{U21}

- HG = Home Grown Player
- U21 = Under 21 Player

Source: 2012–13 Premier League squad

=== Under 21 squad ===
Note: Flags indicate national team as defined under FIFA eligibility rules; some limited exceptions apply. Players may hold more than one non-FIFA nationality.

No.	Pos.	Nation	Player
46	GK	ENG	Jamal Blackman
32	DF	DEN	Andreas Christensen
47	DF	ENG	Billy Clifford
49	DF	ENG	Aziz Deen-Conteh
57	DF	NED	Nathan Aké
58	DF	GHA	Daniel Pappoe
23	DF	SCO	Alex Davey
—	DF	ENG	Archange Nkumu
—	DF	TAN	Adam Nditi

No.	Pos.	Nation	Player
71	MF	ENG	Lewis Baker
36	MF	BEL	Lamisha Musonda
—	MF	BEL	Tika Musonda
33	MF	ENG	Ruben Loftus-Cheek
—	MF	ENG	John Swift
—	MF	ENG	Alex Kiwomya
64	FW	SVK	Milan Lalkovič
44	FW	ENG	Patrick Bamford
—	FW	SCO	Islam Feruz

Source: 2012–13 Under 21 squad

=== UEFA Champions League squad ===
Note: Flags indicate national team as defined under FIFA eligibility rules; some limited exceptions apply. Players may hold more than one non-FIFA nationality.

No.	Pos.	Nation	Player
1	GK	CZE	Petr Čech
2	DF	SRB	Branislav Ivanović
3	DF	ENG	Ashley Cole ^{HG^{1}}
4	DF	BRA	David Luiz
6	MF	ESP	Oriol Romeu
7	MF	BRA	Ramires
8	MF	ENG	Frank Lampard ^{HG^{1}} (Vice-Captain)
9	FW	ESP	Fernando Torres
10	MF	ESP	Juan Mata
11	MF	BRA	Oscar
12	MF	NGR	Mikel John Obi
13	MF	NGR	Victor Moses ^{HG^{1}}
17	MF	BEL	Eden Hazard
19	DF	POR	Paulo Ferreira
21	MF	GER	Marko Marin

No.	Pos.	Nation	Player
22	GK	ENG	Ross Turnbull ^{HG^{1}}
23	FW	ENG	Daniel Sturridge ^{HG^{1}}
24	DF	ENG	Gary Cahill ^{HG^{1}}
26	DF	ENG	John Terry ^{HG^{2}} (Captain)
28	DF	ESP	César Azpilicueta
34	DF	ENG	Ryan Bertrand ^{HG^{2}}
35	MF	BRA	Lucas Piazon
46	GK	ENG	Jamal Blackman ^{B}
47	DF	ENG	Billy Clifford ^{B}
49	DF	ENG	Aziz Deen-Conteh ^{B}
54	DF	ENG	Todd Kane ^{B}
56	MF	ENG	George Saville ^{B}
58	DF	GHA	Daniel Pappoe ^{B}
60	FW	ENG	Adam Phillip ^{B}

- B = List B Player
- HG^{1} = Association-trained player
- HG^{2} = Club-trained player

Source: 2012–13 UEFA Champions League squad

=== UEFA Europa League squad ===
Note: Flags indicate national team as defined under FIFA eligibility rules; some limited exceptions apply. Players may hold more than one non-FIFA nationality.

No.	Pos.	Nation	Player
1	GK	CZE	Petr Čech
2	DF	SRB	Branislav Ivanović
3	DF	ENG	Ashley Cole ^{HG^{1}}
4	DF	BRA	David Luiz
7	MF	BRA	Ramires
8	MF	ENG	Frank Lampard ^{HG^{1}} (vice-captain)
9	FW	ESP	Fernando Torres
10	MF	ESP	Juan Mata
11	MF	BRA	Oscar
12	MF	NGR	Mikel John Obi
13	MF	NGR	Victor Moses ^{HG^{1}}
17	MF	BEL	Eden Hazard
19	DF	POR	Paulo Ferreira

No.	Pos.	Nation	Player
21	MF	GER	Marko Marin
22	GK	ENG	Ross Turnbull ^{HG^{1}}
24	DF	ENG	Gary Cahill ^{HG^{1}}
26	DF	ENG	John Terry ^{HG^{2}} (captain)
28	DF	ESP	César Azpilicueta
30	MF	ISR	Yossi Benayoun
34	DF	ENG	Ryan Bertrand ^{HG^{2}}
40	GK	POR	Henrique Hilário
46	GK	ENG	Jamal Blackman ^{B}
49	DF	ENG	Aziz Deen-Conteh ^{B}
56	MF	ENG	George Saville ^{B}
57	DF	NED	Nathan Aké
58	DF	GHA	Daniel Pappoe ^{B}

- B = List B Player
- HG^{1} = Association-trained player
- HG^{2} = Club-trained player

Source: 2012–13 UEFA Europa League squad

=== FIFA Club World Cup squad ===
Note: Flags indicate national team as defined under FIFA eligibility rules; some limited exceptions apply. Players may hold more than one non-FIFA nationality.

No.	Pos.	Nation	Player
1	GK	CZE	Petr Čech
2	DF	SRB	Branislav Ivanović
3	DF	ENG	Ashley Cole ^{HG^{1}}
4	DF	BRA	David Luiz
6	MF	ESP	~~Oriol Romeu~~
7	MF	BRA	Ramires
8	MF	ENG	Frank Lampard ^{HG^{1}}
9	FW	ESP	Fernando Torres
10	MF	ESP	Juan Mata
11	MF	BRA	Oscar
12	MF	NGR	Mikel John Obi
13	MF	NGR	Victor Moses ^{HG^{1}}

No.	Pos.	Nation	Player
17	MF	BEL	Eden Hazard
19	DF	POR	Paulo Ferreira
21	MF	GER	Marko Marin
22	GK	ENG	Ross Turnbull ^{HG^{1}}
23	FW	ENG	Daniel Sturridge ^{HG^{1}}
24	DF	ENG	Gary Cahill ^{HG^{1}}
26	DF	ENG	~~John Terry~~ ^{HG^{2}}
28	DF	ESP	César Azpilicueta
34	DF	ENG	Ryan Bertrand ^{HG^{2}}
35	MF	BRA	Lucas Piazon
40	GK	POR	Henrique Hilário
56	MF	ENG	George Saville ^{HG^{2}}

- HG^{1} = Association-trained player
- HG^{2} = Club-trained player

Source: 2012 FIFA Club World Cup squad

== Transfers ==
=== In ===
==== Summer ====
No.	Pos	Player	Transferred from	Fee	Date	Source
—	MF	(Belgium) Lamisha Musonda	(Belgium) Anderlecht	Undisclosed	1 July 2012	
—	MF	(Belgium) Charly Musonda	(Belgium) Anderlecht	£1.75 million	1 July 2012	
—	MF	(Belgium) Tika Musonda	(Belgium) Anderlecht	Undisclosed	1 July 2012	
32	DF	(Denmark) Andreas Christensen	(Denmark) Brøndby	Undisclosed	1 July 2012	
21	MF	(Germany) Marko Marin	(Germany) Werder Bremen	£6 million	1 July 2012	
17	MF	(Belgium) Eden Hazard	(France) Lille	£32 million	1 July 2012	
—	MF	(Belgium) Thorgan Hazard	(France) Lens	£0.8 million	24 July 2012	
11	MF	(Brazil) Oscar	(Brazil) Internacional	£19.5 million	25 July 2012	
28	DF	(Spain) César Azpilicueta	(France) Marseille	£7 million	24 August 2012	
13	FW	(Nigeria) Victor Moses	(England) Wigan Athletic	£7 million	24 August 2012	

==== Winter ====
No.	Pos	Player	Transferred from	Fee	Date	Source
—	DF	(Brazil) Wallace	(Brazil) Fluminense	£5.1 million	1 January 2013	
29	FW	(Senegal) Demba Ba	(England) Newcastle United	£7 million	4 January 2013	
—	DF	(Sweden) Ali Suljic	(Sweden) Motala AIF	Undisclosed	29 January 2013	

=== Out ===
==== Summer ====
No.	Pos	Player	Transferred To	Fee	Date	Source
11	FW	(Ivory Coast) Didier Drogba	(China) Shanghai Shenhua	Free transfer	1 July 2012	
17	DF	(Portugal) José Bosingwa	(England) Queens Park Rangers	Free transfer	1 July 2012	
21	FW	(Ivory Coast) Salomon Kalou	(France) Lille	Free transfer	1 July 2012	
53	FW	(Sweden) Marko Mitrović	(Italy) Brescia	Free transfer	1 July 2012	
60	GK	(Wales) Rhys Taylor	(England) Preston North End	Free transfer	1 July 2012	
16	MF	(Portugal) Raul Meireles	(Turkey) Fenerbahçe	£8 million	3 September 2012	

==== Winter ====
No.	Pos	Player	Transferred To	Fee	Date	Source
23	FW	(England) Daniel Sturridge	(England) Liverpool	£12 million	2 January 2013	
—	DF	(England) Alistair Gordon	(England) Crystal Palace	Free transfer	27 January 2013	
55	MF	(England) James Ashton	(England) Carshalton Athletic	Free transfer	31 January 2013	
48	MF	(Republic of Ireland) Conor Clifford	(England) Leicester City	Free transfer	31 January 2013	
—	DF	(England) Ben Gordon	(England) Yeovil Town	Free transfer	31 January 2013	
51	DF	(England) Rohan Ince	(England) Brighton & Hove Albion	Free transfer	31 January 2013	
60	FW	(England) Adam Coombes	(England) Notts County	Free transfer	31 January 2013	

=== Loan out ===
No.	Pos	Player	Loaned To	Start	End	Loan Fee	Source
—	DF	(Nigeria) Kenneth Omeruo	(Netherlands) ADO Den Haag	7 January 2012	30 June 2013	Free	
43	DF	(Netherlands) Jeffrey Bruma	(Germany) Hamburg	1 July 2012	30 June 2013	Unknown	
—	GK	(Belgium) Thibaut Courtois	(Spain) Atlético Madrid	1 July 2012	30 June 2013	Unknown	
—	FW	(Uruguay) Jhon Pírez	(Spain) Sabadell	9 July 2012	23 July 2012	Free	
—	DF	(Czech Republic) Tomáš Kalas	(Netherlands) Vitesse Arnhem	11 July 2012	30 June 2013	Free	
38	DF	(Netherlands) Patrick van Aanholt	(Netherlands) Vitesse Arnhem	11 July 2012	30 June 2013	Free	
—	MF	(Mexico) Ulises Dávila	(Spain) Sabadell	13 July 2012	30 June 2013	Free	
51	DF	(England) Rohan Ince	(England) Yeovil Town	13 July 2012	26 September 2012	Free	
—	GK	(Croatia) Matej Delač	(Portugal) Vitória Guimarães	17 July 2012	4 January 2013	Free	
64	FW	(Slovakia) Milan Lalkovič	(Portugal) Vitória Guimarães	17 July 2012	4 January 2013	Free	
14	MF	(Belgium) Kevin De Bruyne	(Germany) Werder Bremen	2 August 2012	30 June 2013	€450,000	
48	MF	(Republic of Ireland) Conor Clifford	(England) Portsmouth	8 August 2012	17 September 2012	Free	
—	DF	(England) Ben Gordon	(England) Birmingham City	10 August 2012	7 January 2013	Free	
18	FW	(Belgium) Romelu Lukaku	(England) West Bromwich Albion	10 August 2012	31 May 2013	Free	
—	GK	(England) Sam Walker	(England) Bristol Rovers	14 August 2012	2 January 2013	Free	
27	DF	(England) Sam Hutchinson	(England) Nottingham Forest	16 August 2012	31 May 2013	Free	
20	MF	(England) Josh McEachran	(England) Middlesbrough	20 August 2012	31 May 2013	Free	
57	DF	(England) Archange Nkumu	(England) Yeovil Town	23 August 2012	23 September 2012	Free	
—	MF	(Sweden) Amin Affane	(Netherlands) Roda JC	31 August 2012	18 March 2013	Free	
30	MF	(Israel) Yossi Benayoun	(England) West Ham United	31 August 2012	3 January 2013	Free	
45	DF	(England) Nathaniel Chalobah	(England) Watford	31 August 2012	31 May 2013	Free	
5	MF	(Ghana) Michael Essien	(Spain) Real Madrid	31 August 2012	30 June 2013	Unknown	
—	MF	(Belgium) Thorgan Hazard	(Belgium) Zulte Waregem	31 August 2012	30 June 2013	Free	
31	MF	(France) Gaël Kakuta	(Netherlands) Vitesse Arnhem	31 August 2012	30 June 2013	Free	
—	FW	(Uruguay) Jhon Pírez	(Spain) Leganés	4 September 2012	30 June 2013	Free	
55	MF	(England) James Ashton	(England) Charlton Athletic	1 October 2012	November 2012	Free	
—	DF	(England) Archange Nkumu	(England) Colchester United	23 October 2012	13 December 2012	Free	
—	FW	(England) Patrick Bamford	(England) Milton Keynes Dons	22 November 2012	7 January 2013	Free	
48	MF	(Republic of Ireland) Conor Clifford	(England) Crawley Town	22 November 2012	5 January 2013	Free	
54	DF	(England) Todd Kane	(England) Preston North End	22 November 2012	5 January 2013	Free	
—	MF	(Sweden) Anjur Osmanović	(Sweden) Lärje-Angereds IF	22 November 2012	30 June 2013	Free	
—	DF	(Brazil) Wallace	(Brazil) Fluminense	1 January 2013	30 June 2013	Free	
54	DF	(England) Todd Kane	(England) Blackburn Rovers	9 January 2013	9 February 2013	Free	
—	GK	(Croatia) Matej Delač	(Croatia) Inter Zaprešić	10 January 2013	30 June 2013	Free	
47	MF	(England) Billy Clifford	(England) Colchester United	11 January 2013	27 April 2013	Free	
—	GK	(England) Sam Walker	(England) Colchester United	14 January 2013	27 April 2013	Free	
35	MF	(Brazil) Lucas Piazon	(Spain) Málaga	15 January 2013	30 June 2013	Unknown	
—	FW	(England) Patrick Bamford	(England) Milton Keynes Dons	31 January 2013	20 May 2013	Free	
56	MF	(England) George Saville	(England) Millwall	28 February 2013	4 May 2013	Free	
54	DF	(England) Todd Kane	(England) Blackburn Rovers	15 March 2013	31 May 2013	Free	

=== Overall transfer activity ===
==== Spending ====
Summer: ▼£74,050,000

Winter: ▼£12,100,000

Total: ▼£86,150,000

==== Income ====
Summer: ▲£8,000,000

Winter: ▲£12,000,000

Total: ▲£20,000,000

==== Totals ====
Summer: ▼£66,050,000

Winter: ▼£100,000

Total: ▼£66,150,000

== Friendlies ==
=== Pre-season ===
18 July 2012 World Football Challenge	Seattle Sounders FC (United States)	2–4	(England) Chelsea	Seattle
21:30 PDT	Montero 13', 31'	Report	Lukaku 2', 43'; Hazard 10'; Marin 39'	Stadium: CenturyLink Field; Attendance: 53,309; Referee: Ricardo Salazar (United States)

22 July 2012 World Football Challenge	Chelsea (England)	1–1	(France) Paris Saint-Germain	Bronx, New York
19:00 EDT	Mikel (yellow card) 58'; Piazon 82'	Report	Lavezzi (yellow card) 7'; Nenê 29'; Sakho (yellow card) 40'; Verratti (yellow card) 59'	Stadium: Yankee Stadium; Attendance: 38,202; Referee: Edvin Jurisevic (United States)

25 July 2012 MLS All-Star Game	MLS All-Stars (United States)	3–2	(England) Chelsea	Chester, Pennsylvania
20:55 EDT	Wondolowski 21'; Pontius 73'; Johnson 90+1'	Report	Terry 32'; Lampard 58'	Stadium: PPL Park; Attendance: 19,236; Referee: Baldomero Toledo (United States)

28 July 2012 World Football Challenge	Chelsea (England)	0–1	(Italy) Milan	Miami Gardens, Florida
18:00 EDT		Report	Emanuelson 68'	Stadium: Sun Life Stadium; Attendance: 57,748; Referee: Ricardo Salazar (United States)

4 August 2012 Friendly	Brighton & Hove Albion (England)	3–1	(England) Chelsea	Brighton and Hove
15:00 BST	Vicente 37'; Barnes 44'; Crofts 86'	Report	Lampard 35'	Stadium: Falmer Stadium; Attendance: 17,149; Referee: Dave Phillips (England)

=== Post-season ===
23 May 2013 Friendly	Chelsea (England)	3–4	(England) Manchester City	St. Louis, Missouri
	Ba 15'; Azpilicueta 44' (pen.); Oscar 54'	Report	García 61'; Džeko 64', 85'; Richards 90'	Stadium: Busch Stadium; Attendance: 48,263

25 May 2013 Friendly	Chelsea (England)	3–5	(England) Manchester City	New York City
	Ramires 45', 68'; Mata 82'	Report	Barry 3'; Nasri 29', 73'; Milner 54'; Džeko 85'	Stadium: Yankee Stadium; Attendance: 39,462

== Competitions ==
=== Overall ===
Competition	Started round	Final position / round	First match	Last match
Premier League	—	3rd	19 August 2012	19 May 2013
FA Cup	3rd round	Semi Final	5 January 2013	14 April 2013
League Cup	3rd round	Semi Final	25 September 2012	23 January 2013
FA Community Shield	Final	Runners-up	12 August 2012	
UEFA Champions League	Group stage	Group stage	19 September 2012	5 December 2012
UEFA Europa League	Round of 32	Winners	14 February 2013	15 May 2013
UEFA Super Cup	Final	Runners-up	31 August 2012	
FIFA Club World Cup	Semi Final	Runners-up	13 December 2012	16 December 2012

=== Competition record ===
Competition	Record							
Competition	G	W	D	L	GF	GA	GD	Win %
Premier League	38	22	9	7	75	39	+36	57.89
FA Cup	7	4	2	1	17	7	+10	57.14
League Cup	5	3	1	1	16	7	+9	60.00
Community Shield	1	0	0	1	2	3	−1	0.00
UEFA Super Cup	1	0	0	1	1	4	−3	0.00
Champions League	6	3	1	2	16	10	+6	50.00
Europa League	9	6	1	2	17	10	+7	66.67
FIFA Club World Cup	2	1	0	1	3	2	+1	50.00
Total	69	39	14	16	147	82	+65	56.52

=== FA Community Shield ===
12 August 2012 Final	Chelsea	2–3	Manchester City	Birmingham
13:30 BST	Torres 40'; Bertrand 79', (yellow card) 79'; Ramires (yellow card) 31'; Ivanović (red card) 41'; Mikel (yellow card) 43'; Lampard (yellow card) 45'; Cole (yellow card) 61'	Report	Y. Touré 53'; Tevez 59'; Nasri 65'; Savić (yellow card) 10'; Kompany (yellow card) 48'; Pantilimon (yellow card) 79'	Stadium: Villa Park; Attendance: 36,394; Referee: Kevin Friend

=== UEFA Super Cup ===
31 August 2012 Final	Chelsea (England)	1–4	(Spain) Atlético Madrid	Monaco
20:45 CEST	Ivanović (yellow card) 29'; Cahill 75'	Report	Falcao 6', 19', 45'; Miranda 60'	Stadium: Stade Louis II; Attendance: 14,312; Referee: Damir Skomina (Slovenia)

=== FIFA Club World Cup ===
13 December 2012 Semi-finals	Monterrey (Mexico)	1–3	(England) Chelsea	Yokohama, Japan
10:30 GMT	De Nigris 90+1'	Report	Mata 17'; Torres 46'; Chávez 48' (o.g.)	Stadium: International Stadium Yokohama; Attendance: 36,648; Referee: Carlos Vera (Ecuador)

16 December 2012 Final	Corinthians (Brazil)	1–0	(England) Chelsea	Yokohama, Japan
10:30 GMT	Guerrero 69'; Jorge Henrique (yellow card) 55'	Report	David Luiz (yellow card) 70'; Cahill (red card) 90'	Stadium: International Stadium Yokohama; Attendance: 68,275; Referee: Cüneyt Çakır (Turkey)

=== Premier League ===
==== League table ====
Pos	Team	Pld	W	D	L	GF	GA	GD	Pts	Qualification or relegation
1	Manchester United (C)	38	28	5	5	86	43	+43	89	Qualification for the Champions League group stage
2	Manchester City	38	23	9	6	66	34	+32	78	Qualification for the Champions League group stage
3	Chelsea	38	22	9	7	75	39	+36	75	Qualification for the Champions League group stage
4	Arsenal	38	21	10	7	72	37	+35	73	Qualification for the Champions League play-off round
5	Tottenham Hotspur	38	21	9	8	66	46	+20	72	Qualification for the Europa League play-off round

Source: Barclays Premier League
Rules for classification: 1) Points; 2) Goal difference; 3) Goals scored; 4) Play-offs (only if needed to decide champion, teams for relegation or teams for UEFA competitions).
(C) Champions

==== Results summary ====
Overall								Home						Away					
Pld	W	D	L	GF	GA	GD	Pts	W	D	L	GF	GA	GD	W	D	L	GF	GA	GD
38	22	9	7	75	39	+36	75	12	5	2	41	16	+25	10	4	5	34	23	+11

==== Results by round ====
Round	1	2	3	4	5	6	7	8	9	10	11	12	13	14	15	16	17	18	19	20	21	22	23	24	25	26	27	28	29	30	31	32	33	34	35	36	37	38
Ground	A	H	H	A	H	A	H	A	H	A	H	A	H	H	A	A	H	A	A	H	A	H	H	A	A	H	A	H	H	A	H	A	A	H	A	H	A	H
Result	W	W	W	D	W	W	W	W	L	D	D	L	D	D	L	W	W	W	W	L	W	D	W	D	L	W	L	W	W	L	W	W	D	W	W	D	W	W
Position	4	2	1	1	1	1	1	1	1	2	3	3	4	3	3	3	3	3	3	4	3	3	3	3	3	3	4	4	3	3	4	3	4	3	3	3	3	3
Points	3	6	9	10	13	16	19	22	22	23	24	24	25	26	26	29	32	35	38	38	41	42	45	46	46	49	49	52	55	55	58	61	62	65	68	69	72	75

A = Away; H = Home; W = Win; D = Draw; L = Loss

==== Matches ====
19 August 2012 1	Wigan Athletic	0–2	Chelsea	Wigan
13:30 BST	Caldwell (yellow card) 10'; McArthur (yellow card) 56'	Report	Ivanović 2'; Lampard 7' (pen.), (yellow card) 79'; David Luiz (yellow card) 34'	Stadium: DW Stadium; Attendance: 19,738; Referee: Mike Jones

22 August 2012 2	Chelsea	4–2	Reading	London
19:45 BST	Lampard 18' (pen.); Cahill 68'; Torres 80'; Ivanović 90+5'	Report	Pogrebnyak 24', (yellow card) 65'; Guthrie 28'; Karacan (yellow card) 58'	Stadium: Stamford Bridge; Attendance: 41,733; Referee: Lee Mason

25 August 2012 3	Chelsea	2–0	Newcastle United	London
17:30 GMT	Hazard 22' (pen.); Torres (yellow card) 40', (goal) 45+3'	Report		Stadium: Stamford Bridge; Attendance: 41,718; Referee: Phil Dowd

15 September 2012 4	Queens Park Rangers	0–0	Chelsea	London
15:00 GMT		Report	Ramires (yellow card) 14'; Bertrand (yellow card) 27'	Stadium: Loftus Road; Attendance: 18,271; Referee: Andre Marriner

22 September 2012 5	Chelsea	1–0	Stoke City	London
15:00 GMT	Cole 85'; Oscar (yellow card) 50'; David Luiz (yellow card) 90+2'	Report	Adam (yellow card) 23'	Stadium: Stamford Bridge; Attendance: 41,112; Referee: Michael Oliver

29 September 2012 6	Arsenal	1–2	Chelsea	London
12:45 GMT	Ramsey (yellow card) 34'; Gervinho 42'; Vermaelen (yellow card) 52'	Report	Torres 19'; Oscar (yellow card) 38'; David Luiz (yellow card) 48'; Mata 54'; Ramires (yellow card) 90+3'	Stadium: Emirates Stadium; Attendance: 60,101; Referee: Martin Atkinson

6 October 2012 7	Chelsea	4–1	Norwich City	London
15:00 BST	Torres 14'; Lampard 22'; Hazard 30'; Ivanović 76'	Report	Holt 11'	Stadium: Stamford Bridge; Attendance: 41,784; Referee: Anthony Taylor

20 October 2012 8	Tottenham Hotspur	2–4	Chelsea	London
12:45 BST	Huddlestone (yellow card) 37'; Gallas (yellow card) 39', (goal) 46'; Walker (yellow card) 45+1'; Defoe 53'	Report	Cahill 17'; Ivanović (yellow card) 24'; Ramires (yellow card) 45+3'; Mata 65', 68'; Sturridge 90+1'	Stadium: White Hart Lane; Attendance: 36,060; Referee: Mike Dean

28 October 2012 9	Chelsea	2–3	Manchester United	London
16:00 GMT	Mata 44'; Torres (yellow card) 45' (yellow-red card) 69'; Ramires 54'; Ivanović (red card) 63'; Mikel (yellow card) 76'	Report	David Luiz 3' (o.g.); Van Persie 12'; Hernández 75'; Rooney (yellow card) 43'; Valencia (yellow card) 90+1'	Stadium: Stamford Bridge; Attendance: 41,644; Referee: Mark Clattenburg

3 November 2012 10	Swansea City	1–1	Chelsea	Swansea
15:00 GMT	Britton (yellow card) 36'; De Guzmán (yellow card) 81'; Hernández 87'; Ki (yellow card) 88'; Shechter (yellow card) 90+4'	Report	Azpilicueta (yellow card) 38'; Moses 60'	Stadium: Liberty Stadium; Attendance: 20,527; Referee: Kevin Friend

11 November 2012 11	Chelsea	1–1	Liverpool	London
16:00 GMT	Terry 20'; Mikel (yellow card) 78'	Report	Johnson (yellow card) 55'; Gerrard (yellow card) 66'; Suárez 73'	Stadium: Stamford Bridge; Attendance: 41,627; Referee: Howard Webb

17 November 2012 12	West Bromwich Albion	2–1	Chelsea	West Bromwich
15:00 GMT	Long 10'; Odemwingie 49'	Report	Hazard 39'	Stadium: The Hawthorns; Attendance: 25,933; Referee: Michael Oliver
Note: Roberto Di Matteo's last Premier League game as Chelsea manager

25 November 2012 13	Chelsea	0–0	Manchester City	London
16:00 GMT				Stadium: Stamford Bridge; Attendance: 41,792; Referee: Chris Foy
Note: Rafael Benítez's first game as Chelsea manager.

28 November 2012 14	Chelsea	0–0	Fulham	London
19:45 GMT	Ivanović (yellow card) 67'; Romeu (yellow card) 70'; David Luiz (yellow card) 72'	Report		Stadium: Stamford Bridge; Attendance: 41,707; Referee: Anthony Taylor

1 December 2012 15	West Ham United	3–1	Chelsea	London
12:45 GMT	Cole 62'; Noble (yellow card) 64'; Diamé 85'; Maïga 90+1'	Report	Mata 13'; Čech (yellow card) 43'; Mikel (yellow card) 63'	Stadium: Boleyn Ground; Attendance: 35,005; Referee: Martin Atkinson

8 December 2012 16	Sunderland	1–3	Chelsea	Sunderland
15:00 GMT	Johnson 66'; Gardner (yellow card) 42'	Report	Torres 11', 45+2' (pen.); Mata 49', (yellow card) 86'; Ivanović (yellow card) 71'; Ramires (yellow card) 84'	Stadium: Stadium of Light; Attendance: 39,273; Referee: Mark Halsey

23 December 2012 17	Chelsea	8–0	Aston Villa	London
16:00 GMT	Torres 3'; David Luiz 29'; Ivanović 34'; Lampard 59'; Ramires 76', 90+1'; Oscar 79' (pen.); Hazard 83'; Piazon (penalty missed) 89'	Report		Stadium: Stamford Bridge; Attendance: 41,363; Referee: Phil Dowd

26 December 2012 18	Norwich City	0–1	Chelsea	Norwich
15:00 GMT	Johnson (yellow card) 81'	Report	Mata 38'; Hazard (yellow card) 90+1'	Stadium: Carrow Road; Attendance: 26,831; Referee: Jonathan Moss

30 December 2012 19	Everton	1–2	Chelsea	Liverpool
13:30 GMT	Pienaar 2', (yellow card) 64'; Distin (yellow card) 73'	Report	Lampard 42', 72'; Cahill (yellow card) 48'; David Luiz (yellow card) 70'; Cole (yellow card) 86'	Stadium: Goodison Park; Attendance: 39,485; Referee: Howard Webb

2 January 2013 20	Chelsea	0–1	Queens Park Rangers	London
19:45 GMT	Marin (yellow card) 3'	Report	Wright-Phillips 78'; Hill (yellow card) 85'	Stadium: Stamford Bridge; Attendance: 41,634; Referee: Lee Mason

12 January 2013 21	Stoke City	0–4	Chelsea	Stoke-on-Trent
15:00 GMT	Wilkinson (yellow card) 38'; Walters (penalty missed) 89'	Report	Walters 48', 61' (o.g.); Lampard 64' (pen.); Hazard 72'	Stadium: Britannia Stadium; Attendance: 27,348; Referee: Andre Marriner

16 January 2013 22	Chelsea	2–2	Southampton	London
19:45 GMT	Ba 25'; Hazard 45'; David Luiz (yellow card) 83'	Report	Lambert 58'; Puncheon 75'	Stadium: Stamford Bridge; Attendance: 38,484; Referee: Michael Oliver

20 January 2013 23	Chelsea	2–1	Arsenal	London
13:30 GMT	Mata 6', (yellow card) 65'; Lampard 16' (pen.); Cole (yellow card) 86'	Report	Szczęsny (yellow card) 15'; Walcott 58'	Stadium: Stamford Bridge; Attendance: 41,784; Referee: Martin Atkinson

30 January 2013 24	Reading	2–2	Chelsea	Reading
20:00 GMT	McAnuff (yellow card) 28'; Le Fondre 87', 90+4'	Report	Ramires (yellow card) 39'; Mata 45+1'; Lampard 65'; Azpilicueta (yellow card) 90+5'	Stadium: Madejski Stadium; Attendance: 24,097; Referee: Mark Halsey

2 February 2013 25	Newcastle United	3–2	Chelsea	Newcastle upon Tyne
15:00 GMT	Gutiérrez 40'; Perch (yellow card) 45+3'; Cissé (yellow card) 61'; Sissoko 67', 89'	Report	Ramires (yellow card) 29'; Lampard 54'; Mata 60' (yellow card) 90+2'; Cole (yellow card) 61'	Stadium: St James' Park; Attendance: 52,314; Referee: Howard Webb

9 February 2013 26	Chelsea	4–1	Wigan Athletic	London
15:00 GMT	Ramires 23'; Hazard 56'; Lampard 86'; Marin 90+1', (yellow card) 90+3'	Report	Maloney 58'; Scharner (yellow card) 64'; Figueroa (yellow card) 79'	Stadium: Stamford Bridge; Attendance: 41,562; Referee: Mike Dean

24 February 2013 27	Manchester City	2–0	Chelsea	Manchester
13:30 GMT	Touré 63'; Tevez 85'	Report		Stadium: City of Manchester Stadium; Attendance: 47,256; Referee: Andre Marriner

2 March 2013 28	Chelsea	1–0	West Bromwich Albion	London
15:00 GMT	Ba 28'; Hazard (yellow card) 55'	Report	McAuley (yellow card) 64'; Odemwingie (yellow card) 84'	Stadium: Stamford Bridge; Attendance: 41,548; Referee: Kevin Friend

17 March 2013 29	Chelsea	2–0	West Ham	London
16:00 GMT	Lampard 19'; Hazard 50'	Report	Reid (yellow card) 70'; Demel (yellow card) 72'	Stadium: Stamford Bridge; Attendance: 41,639; Referee: Michael Oliver

30 March 2013 30	Southampton	2–1	Chelsea	Southampton
16:00 GMT	Rodriguez 23'; Lambert 35', (yellow card) 83'; Schneiderlin (yellow card) 87'	Report	Terry 33'; Torres (yellow card) 76'	Stadium: St Mary's Stadium; Attendance: 31,779; Referee: Jonathan Moss

7 April 2013 31	Chelsea	2–1	Sunderland	London
15:00 GMT	Kilgallon 47' (o.g.); Ivanović 55'	Report	Gardner (yellow card) 25'; Azpilicueta 45+1' (o.g.); Rose (yellow card) 62'	Stadium: Stamford Bridge; Attendance: 41,500; Referee: Neil Swarbrick

17 April 2013 32	Fulham	0–3	Chelsea	London
20:00 GMT	Ruiz (yellow card) 44'; Senderos (yellow card) 47'	Report	Ivanović (yellow card) 18'; David Luiz 30'; Terry 43', 71'	Stadium: Craven Cottage; Attendance: 25,002; Referee: Mike Dean

21 April 2013 33	Liverpool	2–2	Chelsea	Liverpool
16:00 GMT	Henderson (yellow card) 29'; Sturridge 52'; Lucas (yellow card) 54'; Suárez (yellow card) 56', (goal) 90+7'; Carragher (yellow card) 64'; Shelvey (yellow card) 82'	Report	Oscar 26'; Torres (yellow card) 38'; Azpilicueta (yellow card) 53'; Hazard 57' (pen.); Čech (yellow card) 90+7'	Stadium: Anfield; Attendance: 45,009; Referee: Kevin Friend

28 April 2013 34	Chelsea	2–0	Swansea City	London
15:00 GMT	Oscar 43'; Lampard 45+2' (pen.); Azpilicueta (yellow card) 55'	Report	Williams (yellow card) 37'; Britton (yellow card) 45+1'; Davies (yellow card) 69'	Stadium: Stamford Bridge; Attendance: 41,780; Referee: Mark Clattenburg

5 May 2013 35	Manchester United	0–1	Chelsea	Manchester
16:00 GMT	Vidić (yellow card) 52'; Jones (yellow card) 80'; Rafael (red card) 89'	Report	David Luiz (yellow card) 85'; Mata 87'	Stadium: Old Trafford; Attendance: 75,500; Referee: Howard Webb

8 May 2013 36	Chelsea	2–2	Tottenham Hotspur	London
19:45 GMT	Oscar 10'; Ramires 39', (yellow card) 90+1'	Report	Adebayor 26'; Vertonghen (yellow card) 78'; Sigurðsson 80'; Bale (yellow card) 86'	Stadium: Stamford Bridge; Attendance: 41,581; Referee: Mike Dean

11 May 2013 37	Aston Villa	1–2	Chelsea	Birmingham
12:45 GMT	Baker (yellow card) 4'; Benteke 14', (red card) 58'	Report	Ramires (yellow card) 16' (yellow-red card) 44'; Terry (yellow card) 42'; Lampard 60', 88', (yellow card) 84'	Stadium: Villa Park; Attendance: 42,084; Referee: Lee Mason

19 May 2013 38	Chelsea	2–1	Everton	London
16:00 GMT	Mata 7'; Torres (yellow card) 34', (goal) 76'; David Luiz (yellow card) 82'	Report	Naismith 14'; Fellaini (yellow card) 57'; Heitinga (yellow card) 70'	Stadium: Stamford Bridge; Attendance: 41,794; Referee: Anthony Taylor

=== FA Cup ===
5 January 2013 Third round	Southampton	1–5	Chelsea	Southampton
15:00 GMT	Rodriguez 22'; De Ridder (yellow card) 77'; Ward-Prowse (yellow card) 88'	Report	Ba 35', 61'; Moses 45'; Ivanović 51'; Lampard 82' (pen.)	Stadium: St Mary's Stadium; Attendance: 27,813; Referee: Mike Dean

27 January 2013 Fourth round	Brentford	2–2	Chelsea	Brentford
12:00 GMT	Trotta 42'; Forrester 73' (pen.)	Report	Oscar 55'; Cahill (yellow card) 43'; Turnbull (yellow card) 72'; Torres 83'	Stadium: Griffin Park; Attendance: 12,146; Referee: Jonathan Moss

17 February 2013 Replay	Chelsea	4–0	Brentford	London
12:00 GMT	Mata 53'; Oscar 67'; Ivanović (yellow card) 69'; Lampard 71'; Terry 81'; David Luiz (yellow card) 84'	Report		Stadium: Stamford Bridge; Attendance: 40,961; Referee: Neil Swarbrick

27 February 2013 Fifth round	Middlesbrough	0–2	Chelsea	Middlesbrough
19:45 GMT	McManus (yellow card) 69'; Bailey (yellow card) 87'	Report	Ramires 51'; Moses 72'	Stadium: Riverside Stadium; Attendance: 27,856; Referee: Martin Atkinson

10 March 2013 Quarter-finals	Manchester United	2–2	Chelsea	Manchester
16:30 GMT	Hernández 5'; Rooney 11'	Report	Azpilicueta (yellow card) 41'; David Luiz (yellow card) 54'; Hazard 59', (yellow card) 75'; Ramires 68'	Stadium: Old Trafford; Attendance: 75,196; Referee: Howard Webb

1 April 2013 Replay	Chelsea	1–0	Manchester United	London
12:30 GMT	Ba 49'; Bertrand (yellow card) 60'; Azpilicueta (yellow card) 77'; Mata (yellow card) 89'; Oscar (yellow card) 90'	Report	Cleverley (yellow card) 54'	Stadium: Stamford Bridge; Attendance: 40,704; Referee: Phil Dowd

14 April 2013 Semi-finals	Chelsea	1–2	Manchester City	London
16:00 GMT	Ramires (yellow card) 46'; Ba 66'; Torres (yellow card) 85'		Barry (yellow card) 26'; Nasri 35'; Y. Touré (yellow card) 45'; Agüero 47'; Kompany (yellow card) 78'	Stadium: Wembley Stadium; Attendance: 85,621; Referee: Chris Foy

=== League Cup ===
25 September 2012 Third round	Chelsea	6–0	Wolverhampton Wanderers	London
19:45 BST	Cahill 4'; Bertrand 8'; Mata 17'; Romeu 53' (pen.); Torres 58'; Moses 71'	Report		Stadium: Stamford Bridge; Attendance: 32,569; Referee: Neil Swarbrick

31 October 2012 Fourth round	Chelsea	5–4 (a.e.t.)	Manchester United	London
19:45 GMT	Romeu (yellow card) 11'; Mikel (yellow card) 24'; David Luiz 30' (pen.), (yellow card) 90+2'; Cahill 52'; Hazard 90+3' (pen.); Sturridge 97'; Oscar (yellow card) 100'; Ramires (yellow card) 114', (goal) 115'	Report	Giggs 22', 120' (pen.), (yellow card) 118'; Hernández 42'; Nani 58', (yellow card) 100'; Wootton (yellow card) 63'; Keane (yellow card) 104'	Stadium: Stamford Bridge; Attendance: 41,126; Referee: Lee Mason

19 December 2012 Quarter-finals	Leeds United	1–5	Chelsea	Leeds
19:45 GMT	Becchio 37'	Report	Lampard (yellow card) 14'; Mata 46'; Ivanović 64'; Moses 66'; Bertrand (yellow card) 69'; Hazard 80'; Torres 84'	Stadium: Elland Road; Attendance: 33,816; Referee: Andre Marriner

9 January 2013 Semi-finals; First leg	Chelsea	0–2	Swansea City	London
19:45 GMT	Ba (yellow card) 89'	Report	Michu 38'; Graham 90+1'; Hernández (yellow card) 41'; Chico (yellow card) 47'	Stadium: Stamford Bridge; Attendance: 40,172; Referee: Anthony Taylor

23 January 2013 Semi-finals; Second leg	Swansea City	0–0 (2–0 agg.)	Chelsea	Swansea
19:45 GMT		Report	Hazard (red card) 80'	Stadium: Liberty Stadium; Attendance: 19,506; Referee: Chris Foy

=== UEFA Champions League ===
==== Group stage ====
Pos	Team	Pld	W	D	L	GF	GA	GD	Pts	Qualification	JUV	SHK	CHE	NOR
1	(Italy) Juventus	6	3	3	0	12	4	+8	12	Advance to knockout phase	—	1–1	3–0	4–0
2	(Ukraine) Shakhtar Donetsk	6	3	1	2	12	8	+4	10 (Note: Tied on head-to-head points (3) and head-to-head goal difference (0). Head-to-head away goals: Shakhtar Donetsk 2, Chelsea 1.)	Advance to knockout phase	0–1	—	2–1	2–0
3	(England) Chelsea	6	3	1	2	16	10	+6	10	Transfer to Europa League	2–2	3–2	—	6–1
4	(Denmark) Nordsjælland	6	0	1	5	4	22	−18	1		1–1	2–5	0–4	—

Source: Soccerway
Notes:

19 September 2012 1	Chelsea (England)	2–2	(Italy) Juventus	London, England
19:45 BST	Oscar 31', 33'; Ramires (yellow card) 60'	Report	Vidal 38', (yellow card) 66'; Quagliarella 80'	Stadium: Stamford Bridge; Attendance: 40,918; Referee: Pedro Proença (Portugal)

2 October 2012 2	Nordsjælland (Denmark)	0–4	(England) Chelsea	Copenhagen, Denmark
19:45 BST	Runje (yellow card) 76'	Report	Mata 33', 82'; David Luiz 79'; Ramires 89'	Stadium: Parken Stadium; Attendance: 25,120; Referee: Marijo Strahonja (Croatia)

23 October 2012 3	Shakhtar Donetsk (Ukraine)	2–1	(England) Chelsea	Donetsk, Ukraine
19:45 BST	Teixeira 3'; Fernandinho 52'; Kucher (yellow card) 66'; Hübschman (yellow card) 85'	Report	Oscar 88'; Cole (yellow card) 21'; David Luiz (yellow card) 80'	Stadium: Donbas Arena; Attendance: 51,435; Referee: Damir Skomina (Slovenia)

7 November 2012 4	Chelsea (England)	3–2	(Ukraine) Shakhtar Donetsk	London, England
19:45 GMT	Torres 2'; Oscar 40'; David Luiz (yellow card) 88'; Moses 90+4'	Report	Willian 9', 47'; Teixeira (yellow card) 57'	Stadium: Stamford Bridge; Attendance: 41,067; Referee: Carlos Velasco Carballo (Spain)

20 November 2012 5	Juventus (Italy)	3–0	(England) Chelsea	Turin, Italy
19:45 GMT	Quagliarella 38'; Bonucci (yellow card) 40'; Vidal 61'; Marchisio (yellow card) 84'; Giovinco 90', (yellow card) 90'	Report	Ramires (yellow card) 75'	Stadium: Juventus Stadium; Attendance: 40,000; Referee: Cüneyt Çakır (Turkey)
Note: Roberto Di Matteo's last game as Chelsea manager.

5 December 2012 6	Chelsea (England)	6–1	(Denmark) Nordsjælland	London, England
19:45 GMT	Hazard (penalty missed) 35'; David Luiz 38' (pen.), (yellow card) 90'; Torres 45+2', 55'; Cahill 50'; Mata 63'; Oscar 71'	Report	Stokholm (penalty missed) 31'; John 47'; Christiansen (yellow card) 37'; Mtiliga (yellow card) 50'	Stadium: Stamford Bridge; Attendance: 40,084; Referee: Bas Nijhuis (Netherlands)

=== UEFA Europa League ===
==== Knockout phase ====
===== Round of 32 =====
14 February 2013 First leg	Sparta Prague (Czech Republic)	0–1	(England) Chelsea	Prague, Czech Republic
18:00 GMT	Hušbauer (yellow card) 66'	Report	Oscar 82'; Cahill (yellow card) 40'	Stadium: Generali Arena; Attendance: 18,952; Referee: Daniele Orsato (Italy)

21 February 2013 Second leg	Chelsea (England)	1–1 (2–1 agg.)	(Czech Republic) Sparta Prague	London, England
20:05 GMT	Hazard 90+2'; Bertrand (yellow card) 85'	Report	Lafata 17', (yellow card) 43'; Hybš (yellow card) 55'; Přikryl (yellow card) 84'; Matějovský (yellow card) 86'; Kweuke (yellow card) 90+1'	Stadium: Stamford Bridge; Attendance: 38,642; Referee: Aleksandar Stavrev (Macedonia)

===== Round of 16 =====
7 March 2013 First leg	Steaua București (Romania)	1–0	(England) Chelsea	Bucharest, Romania
18:00 GMT	Rusescu 35' (pen.); Pintilii (yellow card) 50'	Report	Bertrand (yellow card) 30'; Mikel (yellow card) 66'	Stadium: Arena Națională; Attendance: 45,000; Referee: Sergei Karasev (Russia)

14 March 2013 Second leg	Chelsea (England)	3–1 (3–2 agg.)	(Romania) Steaua București	London, England
20:05 GMT	Mata 32'; Terry 58'; Mikel (yellow card) 70'; Torres 71'; Cole (yellow card) 80'	Report	Chiricheș 45+1'; Bourceanu (yellow card) 49'; Râpă (yellow card) 58'	Stadium: Stamford Bridge; Attendance: 28,817; Referee: Stéphane Lannoy (France)

===== Quarter-finals =====
4 April 2013 First leg	Chelsea (England)	3–1	(Russia) Rubin Kazan	London, England
20:05 GMT	Torres 16', 70'; Moses 32'; Terry (yellow card) 41'; Benayoun (yellow card) 77'; Marin (yellow card) 90'	Report	Natcho 41' (pen.); Orbaiz (yellow card) 87'	Stadium: Stamford Bridge; Attendance: 32,994; Referee: Gianluca Rocchi (Italy)

11 April 2013 Second leg	Rubin Kazan (Russia)	3–2 (4–5 agg.)	(England) Chelsea	Moscow, Russia
17:00 GMT	Marcano 50', (yellow card) 87'; Gökdeniz 62'; Natcho 75' (pen.)	Report	Torres 5'; Moses 54'; Oscar (yellow card) 90+1'	Stadium: Luzhniki Stadium; Attendance: 25,000; Referee: Fırat Aydınus (Turkey)

===== Semi-finals =====
25 April 2013 First leg	Basel (Switzerland)	1–2	(England) Chelsea	Basel, Switzerland
20:05 GMT	Dragović (yellow card) 70'; D. Degen (yellow card) 80'; Schär 87' (pen.), (yellow card) 89'	Report	Lampard 12'; Cole (yellow card) 68'; David Luiz (yellow card) 83', (goal) 90+4'; Azpilicueta (yellow card) 86'	Stadium: St. Jakob-Park; Attendance: 36,000; Referee: Pavel Královec (Czech Republic)

2 May 2013 Second leg	Chelsea (England)	3–1 (5–2 agg.)	(Switzerland) Basel	London, England
20:05 GMT	Torres 50'; Moses 52'; Azpilicueta (yellow card) 55'; David Luiz 59'	Report	Salah 45+1'; Schär (yellow card) 66'; Steinhöfer (yellow card) 68'; Die (yellow card) 88'	Stadium: Stamford Bridge; Attendance: 39,403; Referee: Jonas Eriksson (Sweden)

===== Final =====
15 May 2013 Final	Benfica (Portugal)	1–2	(England) Chelsea	Amsterdam, Netherlands
20:45 CEST	Garay (yellow card) 45+1'; Luisão (yellow card) 62'; Cardozo 68' (pen.)	Report	Oscar (yellow card) 14'; Torres 60'; Ivanović 90+3'	Stadium: Amsterdam Arena; Attendance: 46,163; Referee: Björn Kuipers (Netherlands)

== Statistics ==
=== Appearances ===
As of end of season

Rnk	Pos	No.	Player	Premier League	FA Cup	League Cup	Champions League	Europa League	Super Cup	Club World Cup	Community Shield	Total
1	FW	9	(Spain) Fernando Torres	28+8	2+3	3+1	5+1	9	1	2	1	64
1	MF	10	(Spain) Juan Mata	31+4	5+1	5	5+1	5+3	1	2	1	64
1	MF	11	(Brazil) Oscar	24+10	6+1	3+2	5+1	4+5	0+1	1+1	0	64
4	GK	1	(Czech Republic) Petr Čech	36	5	3	6	9	1	2	1	63
5	MF	7	(Brazil) Ramires	28+7	6	3+1	6	8	1	1	1	62
5	MF	17	(Belgium) Eden Hazard	31+3	3+3	2+3	4+2	5+2	1	2	1	62
7	DF	2	(Serbia) Branislav Ivanović	33+1	6	3	6	5+1	1	2	1	59
8	DF	4	(Brazil) David Luiz	29+1	5+1	3+1	6	7	1	2	1	57
9	DF	3	(England) Ashley Cole	31	5	2+1	5	3	1	2	1	51
10	MF	8	(England) Frank Lampard	21+8	3+1	2+1	3	7	1	1+1	1	50
11	DF	28	(Spain) César Azpilicueta	24+3	4+1	5	1	8	0	1+1	—	48
12	DF	24	(England) Gary Cahill	24+2	4	4	4	4	1	2	0	45
13	FW	13	(Nigeria) Victor Moses	12+11	4+1	3	2+2	5+1	0	1+1	—	43
14	MF	12	(Nigeria) Mikel John Obi	19+3	2+1	1	4+1	3+1	1	1	1	38
14	DF	34	(England) Ryan Bertrand	14+5	3+2	3+1	1+2	5	0+1	0	0+1	38
16	DF	26	(England) John Terry	11+3	3	1	2	6	0	0	1	27
17	FW	29	(Senegal) Demba Ba	11+3	5+1	1+1	—					22
18	MF	21	(Germany) Marko Marin	2+4	1+2	1+2	0	1+2	0	0+1	0	16
19	MF	30	(Israel) Yossi Benayoun	0+6	1+1	0	—	3+2	0	—	0	13
20	FW	23	(England) Daniel Sturridge	1+6	—	1	0+2	—	0+1	0	0+1	12
21	MF	6	(Spain) Oriol Romeu	4+2	0	2	1	0	0	0	0	9
22	DF	19	(Portugal) Paulo Ferreira	0+2	1	0+1	0+1	1	0	0+1	0	7
22	GK	22	(England) Ross Turnbull	2+1	2	2	0	0	0	0	0	7
24	MF	57	(Netherlands) Nathan Aké	1+2	1	0	0	1+1	0	0	0	6
25	MF	16	(Portugal) Raul Meireles	1+2	—				0	—	0	3
25	MF	35	(Brazil) Lucas Piazon	0+1	0	2	0	—	0	0	0	3

=== Goalscorers ===
As of end of season.

Rnk	Pos	No.	Player	Premier League	FA Cup	League Cup	Champions League	Europa League	Super Cup	Club World Cup	Community Shield	Total
1	FW	9	(Spain) Fernando Torres	8	1	2	3	6	0	1	1	22
2	MF	10	(Spain) Juan Mata	12	1	2	3	1	0	1	0	20
3	MF	8	(England) Frank Lampard	15	2	0	0	0	0	0	0	17
4	MF	17	(Belgium) Eden Hazard	9	1	2	0	1	0	0	0	13
5	MF	11	(Brazil) Oscar	4	2	0	5	1	0	0	0	12
6	MF	13	(Nigeria) Victor Moses	1	2	2	1	4	0	0	—	10
7	MF	7	(Brazil) Ramires	5	2	1	1	0	0	0	0	9
8	DF	2	(Serbia) Branislav Ivanović	5	1	1	0	1	0	0	0	8
9	DF	4	(Brazil) David Luiz	2	0	1	2	2	0	0	0	7
10	DF	24	(England) Gary Cahill	2	0	2	1	0	1	0	0	6
10	DF	26	(England) John Terry	4	1	0	0	1	0	0	0	6
10	FW	29	(Senegal) Demba Ba	2	4	0	—					6
13	FW	23	(England) Daniel Sturridge	1	—	1	0	—	0	0	0	2
13	DF	34	(England) Ryan Bertrand	0	0	1	0	0	0	0	1	2
15	DF	3	(England) Ashley Cole	1	0	0	0	0	0	0	0	1
15	MF	6	(Spain) Oriol Romeu	0	0	1	0	0	0	0	0	1
15	MF	21	(Germany) Marko Marin	1	0	0	0	0	0	0	0	1
—	Own Goals			3	0	0	0	0	0	1	0	4
TOTALS				75	17	16	16	17	1	3	2	147

=== Clean sheets ===
As of end of season.

Rnk	Pos	No.	Player	Premier League	FA Cup	League Cup	Champions League	Europa League	Super Cup	Club World Cup	Community Shield	Total
1	GK	1	(Czech Republic) Petr Čech	14	3	1	1	1	0	0	0	20
2	GK	22	(England) Ross Turnbull	0	0	1	0	0	0	0	0	1
TOTALS				14	3	2	1	1	0	0	0	21

=== Disciplinary record ===
As of end of season.

Rnk	Pos.	No.	Player	PL			League Cup			FA Cup			CS			Europe			Club World Cup			Total		
Rnk	Pos.	No.	Player	Yellow card	(yellow card) (yellow-red card)	Red card	Yellow card	(yellow card) (yellow-red card)	Red card	Yellow card	(yellow card) (yellow-red card)	Red card	Yellow card	(yellow card) (yellow-red card)	Red card	Yellow card	(yellow card) (yellow-red card)	Red card	Yellow card	(yellow card) (yellow-red card)	Red card	Yellow card	(yellow card) (yellow-red card)	Red card
1	MF	7	(Brazil) Ramires	8	1	0	1	0	0	1	0	0	1	0	0	2	0	0	0	0	0	13	1	0
2	DF	4	(Brazil) David Luiz	8	0	0	1	0	0	2	0	0	0	0	0	4	0	0	1	0	0	16	0	0
3	DF	2	(Serbia) Branislav Ivanović	4	0	1	0	0	0	1	0	0	0	0	1	1	0	0	0	0	0	6	0	2
4	FW	9	(Spain) Fernando Torres	4	1	0	0	0	0	1	0	0	0	0	0	0	0	0	0	0	0	5	1	0
5	DF	28	(Spain) César Azpilicueta	4	0	0	0	0	0	2	0	0	—			2	0	0	0	0	0	8	0	0
6	DF	3	(England) Ashley Cole	3	0	0	0	0	0	0	0	0	1	0	0	3	0	0	0	0	0	7	0	0
6	MF	12	(Nigeria) Mikel John Obi	3	0	0	1	0	0	0	0	0	1	0	0	2	0	0	0	0	0	7	0	0
8	MF	11	(Brazil) Oscar	2	0	0	1	0	0	1	0	0	0	0	0	2	0	0	0	0	0	6	0	0
8	DF	34	(England) Ryan Bertrand	1	0	0	1	0	0	1	0	0	1	0	0	2	0	0	0	0	0	6	0	0
10	MF	17	(Belgium) Eden Hazard	2	0	0	0	0	1	1	0	0	0	0	0	0	0	0	0	0	0	3	0	1
10	DF	24	(England) Gary Cahill	1	0	0	0	0	0	1	0	0	0	0	0	1	0	0	0	0	1	3	0	1
12	MF	8	(England) Frank Lampard	2	0	0	1	0	0	0	0	0	1	0	0	0	0	0	0	0	0	4	0	0
12	MF	10	(Spain) Juan Mata	3	0	0	0	0	0	1	0	0	0	0	0	0	0	0	0	0	0	4	0	0
14	MF	21	(Germany) Marko Marin	2	0	0	0	0	0	0	0	0	0	0	0	1	0	0	0	0	0	3	0	0
15	GK	1	(Czech Republic) Petr Čech	2	0	0	0	0	0	0	0	0	0	0	0	0	0	0	0	0	0	2	0	0
15	MF	6	(Spain) Oriol Romeu	1	0	0	1	0	0	0	0	0	0	0	0	0	0	0	0	0	0	2	0	0
15	DF	26	(England) John Terry	1	0	0	0	0	0	0	0	0	0	0	0	1	0	0	0	0	0	2	0	0
18	GK	22	(England) Ross Turnbull	0	0	0	0	0	0	1	0	0	0	0	0	0	0	0	0	0	0	1	0	0
18	FW	29	(Senegal) Demba Ba	0	0	0	1	0	0	0	0	0	—									1	0	0
18	MF	30	(Israel) Yossi Benayoun	0	0	0	0	0	0	0	0	0	0	0	0	1	0	0	—			1	0	0
TOTALS				51	2	1	8	0	1	13	0	0	5	0	1	22	0	0	1	0	1	100	2	4

=== Overview ===
As of end of season.

Games played	69 (38 Premier League, 7 FA Cup, 5 League Cup, 6 UEFA Champions League, 1 UEFA Super Cup, 2 FIFA Club World Cup, 9 UEFA Europa League, 1 Community Shield)
Games won	39 (22 Premier League, 4 FA Cup, 3 League Cup, 3 UEFA Champions League, 1 FIFA Club World Cup, 6 UEFA Europa League)
Games drawn	14 (9 Premier League, 2 FA Cup, 1 League Cup, 1 UEFA Champions League, 1 UEFA Europa League)
Games lost	16 (7 Premier League, 1 FA Cup, 1 League Cup, 2 UEFA Champions League, 1 UEFA Super Cup, 1 FIFA Club World Cup, 2 UEFA Europa League, 1 Community Shield)
Goals scored	147 (75 Premier League, 17 FA Cup, 16 League Cup, 16 UEFA Champions League, 1 UEFA Super Cup, 3 FIFA Club World Cup, 17 UEFA Europa League, 2 Community Shield)
Goals conceded	82 (39 Premier League, 7 FA Cup, 7 League Cup, 10 UEFA Champions League, 4 UEFA Super Cup, 2 FIFA Club World Cup, 10 UEFA Europa League, 3 Community Shield)
Goal difference	+65 (+36 Premier League, +10 FA Cup, +9 League Cup, +6 UEFA Champions League, −3 UEFA Super Cup, +1 FIFA Club World Cup, +7 UEFA Europa League, −1 Community Shield)
Clean sheets	21 (14 Premier League, 2 League Cup, 3 FA Cup, 1 UEFA Champions League, 1 UEFA Europa League)
Yellow cards	100 (53 Premier League, 11 FA Cup, 8 League Cup, 6 UEFA Champions League, 1 UEFA Super Cup, 1 FIFA Club World Cup, 15 UEFA Europa League, 5 Community Shield)
Red cards	6 (3 Premier League, 1 League Cup, 1 FIFA Club World Cup, 1 Community Shield)
Worst discipline	Ramires (Brazil) (13 (yellow card) , 1 (yellow card) (yellow-red card) )
Best result(s)	W 8 – 0 (H) v Aston Villa – Premier League – 23 December 2012
Worst result(s)	L 1 – 4 (N) v Atlético Madrid – UEFA Super Cup – 31 August 2012
Most Appearances	Juan Mata (Spain) , Oscar (Brazil) & Fernando Torres (Spain) (64 appearances)
Top scorer(s)	Fernando Torres (Spain) (22 goals)
Top assister(s)	Juan Mata (Spain) (35 assists)
Points	Overall: 39/69 (56.52%)

== Awards ==
No.	Player	Award	Month	Source
10	(Spain) Juan Mata	Premier League Player of the Month	October 2012	
4	(Brazil) David Luiz	Silver Ball at the 2012 FIFA Club World Cup	December 2012	
2	(Serbia) Branislav Ivanović	Serbian Footballer of the Year	December 2012	
45	(England) Nathaniel Chalobah	England Men's Youth Player of the Year	February 2013	
3	(England) Ashley Cole	Senior Men's Player of the Year 3rd place	February 2013	
1	(Czech Republic) Petr Čech	Czech Footballer of the Year	February 2013	
–	(Czech Republic) Tomáš Kalas	Czech Talent of the Year	February 2013	
13	(Nigeria) Victor Moses	Samsung Fair Player of the Tournament	February 2013	
–	(Spain) Rafael Benítez	Premier League Manager of the Month	April 2013	
