= Lamisha Musonda =

Belgian footballer (born 1992)

Personal information
- Date of birth: 27 March 1992 (age 34)
- Place of birth: Brussels, Belgium
- Height: 1.67 m (5 ft 6 in)
- Position: Midfielder

Youth career
- 2006–2012: Anderlecht
- 2012–2014: Chelsea

Senior career*
Years	Team	Apps	(Gls)
2014	Mechelen	2	(0)
2017–2018	Llagostera B	5	(0)
2018	Palamós	1	(0)
2018–2019	Mazembe	0	(0)
Total		8	(0)

International career
2011–2013	Belgium U21	9	(0)
- * Club domestic league appearances and goals

Lamisha Musonda (born 27 March 1992) is a Belgian former footballer.

== Club career ==
Musonda joined Chelsea along with his brothers Tika and Charly Jr. in 2012 from Anderlecht.

In January 2014, Chelsea decided to sell Musonda to KV Mechelen. Musonda made his Belgian Pro League debut at 8 March 2014 against Standard Liège. He replaced Boubacar Diabang Dialiba as an 88th-minute substitute. On 1 July 2014, Mechelen announced that they would not be renewing Musonda contract, therefore leading to the expiry of his contract.

On 22 August 2017, Musonda joined Spanish side Llagostera along with his brother, Tika after three years without a club.

After a spell in Spain, Musonda joined Mazembe in November 2018.

== Personal life ==
Lamisha Musonda is the son of former footballer Charly Musonda. He has two brothers: Tika, born 1994, and Charly Jr., born 1996. Both are now retired. Tika has moved into scouting roles for Premier League clubs.

On 9 January 2026, Musonda revealed that he is terminally ill.
