= Daniel Sturridge =

English footballer (born 1989)

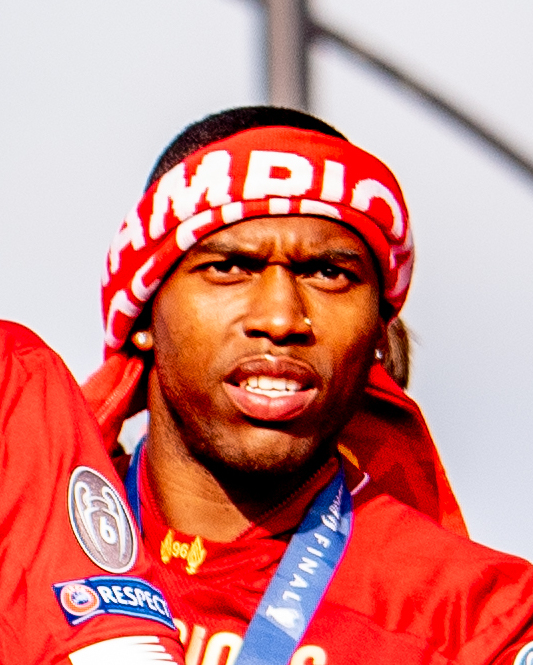
- Sturridge with the parade that followed Liverpool's victory in the 2019 UEFA Champions League final

Personal information
- Full name: Daniel Andre Sturridge
- Date of birth: 1 September 1989 (age 37)
- Place of birth: Birmingham, England
- Height: 6 ft 0 in (1.83 m)
- Position: Striker

Youth career
- 1995–1996: Cadbury Athletic
- 1996–2002: Aston Villa
- 2002–2003: Coventry City
- 2003–2006: Manchester City

Senior career*
Years	Team	Apps	(Gls)
2006–2009	Manchester City	21	(5)
2009–2013	Chelsea	63	(13)
2011	→ Bolton Wanderers (loan)	12	(8)
2013–2019	Liverpool	116	(50)
2018	→ West Bromwich Albion (loan)	6	(0)
2019–2020	Trabzonspor	11	(4)
2021–2022	Perth Glory	6	(0)
Total		235	(80)

International career
2004–2005	England U16	6	(5)
2005–2006	England U17	8	(5)
2007	England U18	1	(2)
2008	England U19	3	(1)
2009	England U20	1	(1)
2009–2011	England U21	15	(4)
2011–2017	England	26	(8)
2012	Great Britain Olympic	5	(2)
- * Club domestic league appearances and goals

Daniel Andre Sturridge (born 1 September 1989) is an English former professional footballer who played as a striker. Since 2023, he has worked as a television pundit for Sky Sports.

Sturridge was scouted by Aston Villa and played for a number of years in their younger academy sides before moving to Coventry City in 2002. He then signed for Manchester City in 2003. He continued his development at City and played in two FA Youth Cup finals. He made his first-team debut in the 2007–08 season, becoming the only player to score in the FA Youth Cup, FA Cup and Premier League in the same season. He left City in 2009 to sign for Chelsea, where he was loaned to Bolton Wanderers for the second half of the 2010–11 season. After a successful spell at Bolton, scoring eight goals in 12 appearances, he returned to Chelsea for the 2011–12 season, winning the FA Cup and UEFA Champions League.

He left Chelsea to join Liverpool in January 2013, where he formed an attacking partnership with Luis Suárez. Liverpool scored more than 100 goals in the 2013–14 Premier League season with Sturridge scoring 21 goals, behind only Suárez on 31. The following two seasons were curtailed by injuries, limiting Sturridge to very few appearances. He scored the opening goal in the 2016 UEFA Europa League final, although Liverpool eventually lost the game to Sevilla. He featured most often as a substitute in the next seasons under manager Jürgen Klopp, but was part of the UEFA Champions League-winning squad in 2019. He subsequently had spells with Turkish Süper Lig club Trabzonspor and Australian A-League club Perth Glory.

Sturridge has represented England at all levels. He made his debut for the senior team against Denmark in November 2011 and was selected for the 2014 FIFA World Cup and UEFA Euro 2016, earning 26 England caps in total. He also represented Great Britain at the 2012 Summer Olympics.

== Early life ==
Daniel Andre Sturridge was born on 1 September 1989 in Birmingham, West Midlands. He is the son of former footballer Mike Sturridge, and the nephew of former footballers Dean and Simon Sturridge. Sturridge is of Jamaican descent, with all of his grandparents being born in Jamaica. He is a relative of former Jamaican footballer Calvin Stewart.

Sturridge was a supporter of Derby County when he was younger because his uncle Dean played for them, but once he left, Sturridge started supporting Arsenal instead.

== Club career ==
=== Youth career ===
Daniel Sturridge began his football career at the age of seven at local club Cadbury Athletic, before being scouted, and subsequently signed by the youth academy of Aston Villa. According to Villa academy director Bryan Jones, Sturridge's father Michael was given a part-time scouting role by Villa but made demands that his role was made full-time or he would leave for Coventry City and take his son with him. Sturridge did leave Villa in 2002 to move to Coventry City, resulting in Aston Villa putting a case to the Premier League 'poaching committee' but it was refused.

From Coventry, Sturridge subsequently joined Manchester City's Academy in 2003. A Football League committee later ordered Manchester City to pay Coventry £30,000 compensation, with further payments up to a maximum of £170,000 based upon appearances and international honours. The following year, he was the leading scorer and voted player of the tournament (the only other person to achieve this was Argentine footballer Carlos Tevez) as City won the Nike Cup, the world's largest under-15 tournament. At 16, he played for Manchester City Youth during their 2006 FA Youth Cup run. The youngest player in the team, he scored four goals en route to the final, and another two in the final, though they were insufficient to prevent a 3–2 aggregate defeat to Liverpool. That summer, he signed his first professional contract, which came into effect when he turned 17.

=== Manchester City ===
From the start of the 2006–07 season, Sturridge began to train with the City first team. A hat-trick in a reserve match was rewarded by a place on the substitutes' bench for the senior team's match with Reading in February 2007. He duly made his debut from the bench, replacing Georgios Samaras for the final quarter-hour. He made a second substitute appearance a month later, but then suffered a hip injury which sidelined him for the remainder of 2007.

Sturridge scored his first goal for City on 27 January 2008 in an FA Cup match against Sheffield United, followed three days later by his first league goal on his full debut, against Derby County. However, first-team opportunities were quite sporadic, so Sturridge continued to play for the youth team in the FA Youth Cup. City again reached the final, with Sturridge the leading scorer in the competition. This time City won the final, with Sturridge scoring in the first leg. In the 2007–08 season, Sturridge became the only player ever to score in the Youth FA Cup, the FA Cup and the Premier League in the same season.

Sturridge contributed in the 2008–09 season with 26 appearances and scoring 4 goals. On 28 December 2008, in a league match against Blackburn Rovers, City were trailing 2–0. Coming on as a 71st-minute substitute, Sturridge scored in the 88th minute of the match taking advantage of a header by André Ooijer. He also went on to assist Robinho's injury time goal. Manager Mark Hughes said that Sturridge was a player with great potential and had an impact in the game. He also praised his assist, saying "he picked out Robinho for the equaliser in an area where we had been struggling to find him". At the end of the season, he was voted as the club's Young Player of the Year.

=== Chelsea ===
==== 2009–10 season ====
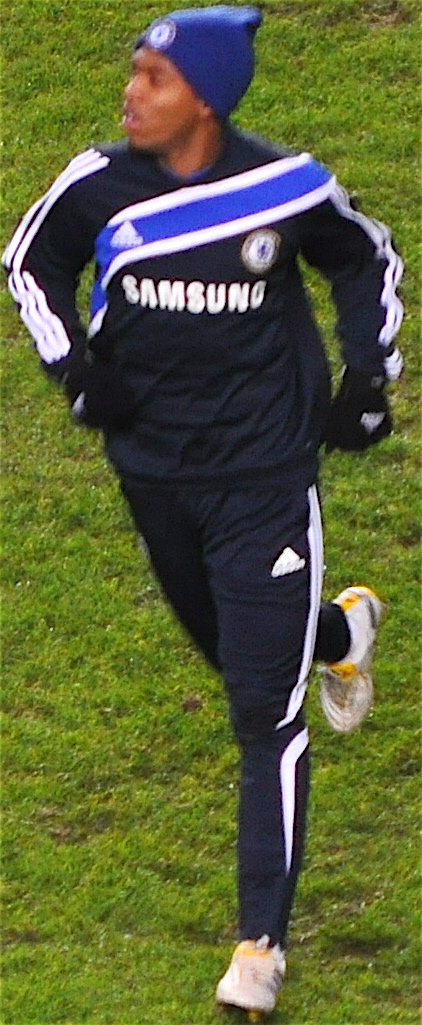
Sturridge training with Chelsea in 2010

With Sturridge's contract at Manchester City expired, he signed for Chelsea on 3 July 2009 on a four-year contract. As Sturridge was under the age of 24, and the two clubs were unable to agree a deal, the fee for Sturridge was decided by a tribunal. The Professional Football Compensation Committee decided on 14 January 2010 that Chelsea would pay an initial fee of £3.5 million, with additional payments of £500,000 after each of 10, 20, 30 and 40 appearances. There would also be a further payment of £1 million if Sturridge made a full international appearance, and Manchester City in addition would receive 15 per cent of any sell-on fee if Sturridge was transferred, after these add ons the fee for the player reached an eventual fee of £8.3m. Sturridge made his Premier League debut for Chelsea on 18 August 2009 against Sunderland, coming on for Didier Drogba. On 28 October, he made his first start for the club in a League Cup win against Bolton Wanderers at Stamford Bridge.

Sturridge made his first start in the Premier League for Chelsea away against Birmingham City on 26 December 2009 and scored his first two goals for Chelsea against Watford in the FA Cup third round on 3 January 2010. Sturridge continued to show his ability with a real poacher's effort in a 2–0 victory in the FA Cup against Preston North End, scoring his third goal for Chelsea in January. On 13 February, he netted again against Cardiff City, as Chelsea won 4–1. Sturridge scored his first League goal for Chelsea on 25 April 2010, in a 7–0 victory over Stoke City at Stamford Bridge, by latching onto a through ball, before rounding goalkeeper Asmir Begović and slotting the ball home. During the 2010 FA Cup final, he came on as a 90th-minute substitute for Chelsea as they won 1–0 against Portsmouth. Sturridge finished the 2009–10 FA Cup campaign as the leading scorer for Chelsea with four goals.

==== 2010–11 season ====
On 15 September 2010, Sturridge made his full UEFA Champions League debut against Slovak team MŠK Žilina. He scored on his debut, his first Champions League tally, in a 4–1 away victory. In the Premier League, in a 1–0 loss to his former club Manchester City, Sturridge came on as a substitute for striker Didier Drogba. He scored his second goal in the Champions League against Žilina, which Chelsea went on to win 2–1 at home. Later that season, he scored two right-footed goals against Ipswich Town.

On 31 January 2011, Sturridge joined Bolton Wanderers on a loan deal until the end of the season. He made his debut two days later, coming on as a substitute at home to Wolverhampton Wanderers, scoring his first goal in the process, an injury time winner. He followed this with another goal in the defeat to Tottenham Hotspur the following weekend, in which he made his first start, before scoring his third goal in three matches in the 2–0 victory over Everton. After Sturridge scored the equaliser against Newcastle United in his fourth match, he became only the sixth player to score in his first four matches for a club in the Premier League. Sturridge continued to make an impact at Bolton and finished his loan spell with eight goals in 12 appearances at the club. Having never been booked in his career, Sturridge received his first ever red card in the final match of the season against former club Manchester City.

==== 2011–12 season ====
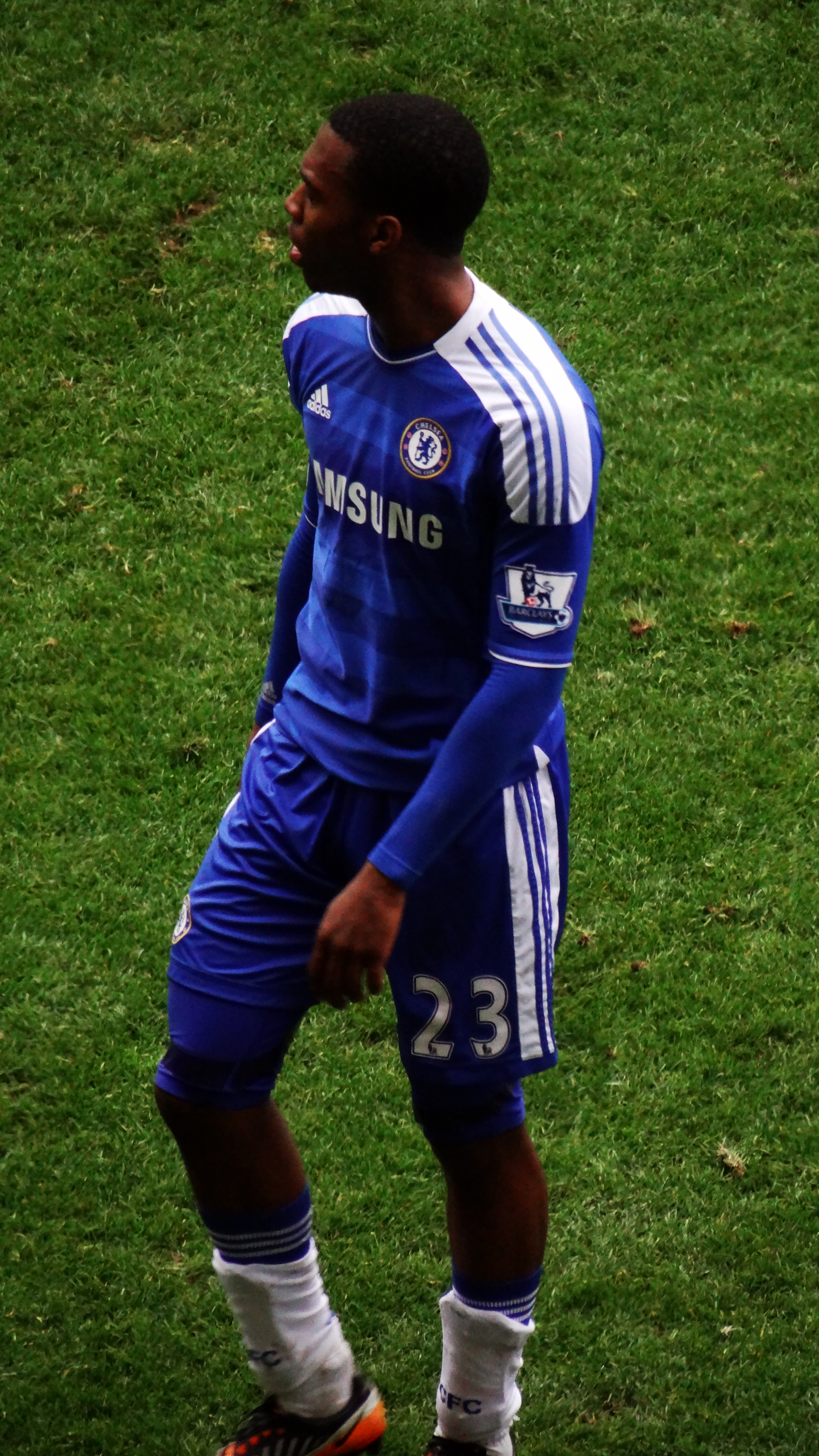
Sturridge playing for Chelsea in 2012

Having received a red card in his final match for Bolton, Sturridge was suspended for the first three competitive matches in the 2011–12 season for Chelsea. Despite rumours linking him with a move away on deadline day, Sturridge remained in West London amidst strong support from his manager André Villas-Boas, who said, "He would have been playing if he was not suspended from last season." In his first match back from suspension, at Sunderland, Sturridge started and scored with a back-heel in the 50th minute to put Chelsea up 2–0 in an eventual 2–1 victory. Sturridge returned to the Reebok Stadium on 2 October 2011, scoring twice within the first 30 minutes, the first a header after 90 seconds from a corner and the second a long-shot from outside the box that goalkeeper Ádám Bogdán erred in saving. Sturridge also provided an assist to Frank Lampard's goal in the 15th minute of the match, which eventually ended 5–1. On 15 October 2011, Sturrdge scored against Everton in a 3–1 win, giving him four league goals in four matches. He then came on as a substitute in the League Cup match against Everton in the 90th-minute, in which he scored a 116th-minute winner, which saw Chelsea win 2–1 in extra time to put them in the last eight.

Sturridge scored his seventh goal in the Premier League season in a 3–0 victory for Chelsea against Newcastle. On 13 December, during the fixture against Sturridge former club Manchester City at Stamford Bridge, Sturridge provided an assist for a Raul Meireles goal in the 34th minute. The match ended a 2–1 victory, when Frank Lampard scored a late penalty after Joleon Lescott handled Sturridge's shot in the penalty area. Sturridge scored in the away 1–1 draw against Wigan Athletic; he controlled Ashley Cole's diagonal long ball with his left foot, then scored with his right from a tight angle to give Chelsea the lead in the 59th minute. On 22 December, during Chelsea's away clash with Tottenham, he scored his ninth goal in the 2011–12 domestic season, the equaliser in a 1–1 draw away at White Hart Lane. Sturridge scored his team's first goal in a 4–2 win against Aston Villa. He scored the opener in fantastic style after 45 seconds with his 11th Premier League goal of the season against local rivals Queens Park Rangers on 29 April, which Chelsea ran out 6–1 winners to keep Champions League qualification alive. He was an unused substitute as Chelsea won the 2012 UEFA Champions League final.

==== 2012–13 season ====
Sturridge missed all of Chelsea's pre-season matches to begin the 2012–13 campaign, as he was on duty with Great Britain in the 2012 Summer Olympics. He did, however, play against Manchester City in the 2012 FA Community Shield, assisting Ryan Bertrand's goal, by shooting and Costel Pantilimon spilling it. Sturridge missed the first 2012–13 UEFA Champions League group stage matches against Juventus and Nordsjælland and the first League Cup match against Wolverhampton. He also missed the Premier League match against Stoke City with a hamstring injury. He scored the last Premier League goal for the club in the 4–2 win against Tottenham at White Hart Lane after coming on as a late substitute and scoring from Juan Mata's cross in stoppage time to seal victory. His last goal for Chelsea was against Manchester United in the League Cup, scoring in extra time in the 5–4 win. After Blues manager Roberto Di Matteo was sacked as manager and replaced by Rafael Benítez, Sturridge was never to play for the club again due to injury.

=== Liverpool ===
==== 2012–13 season ====
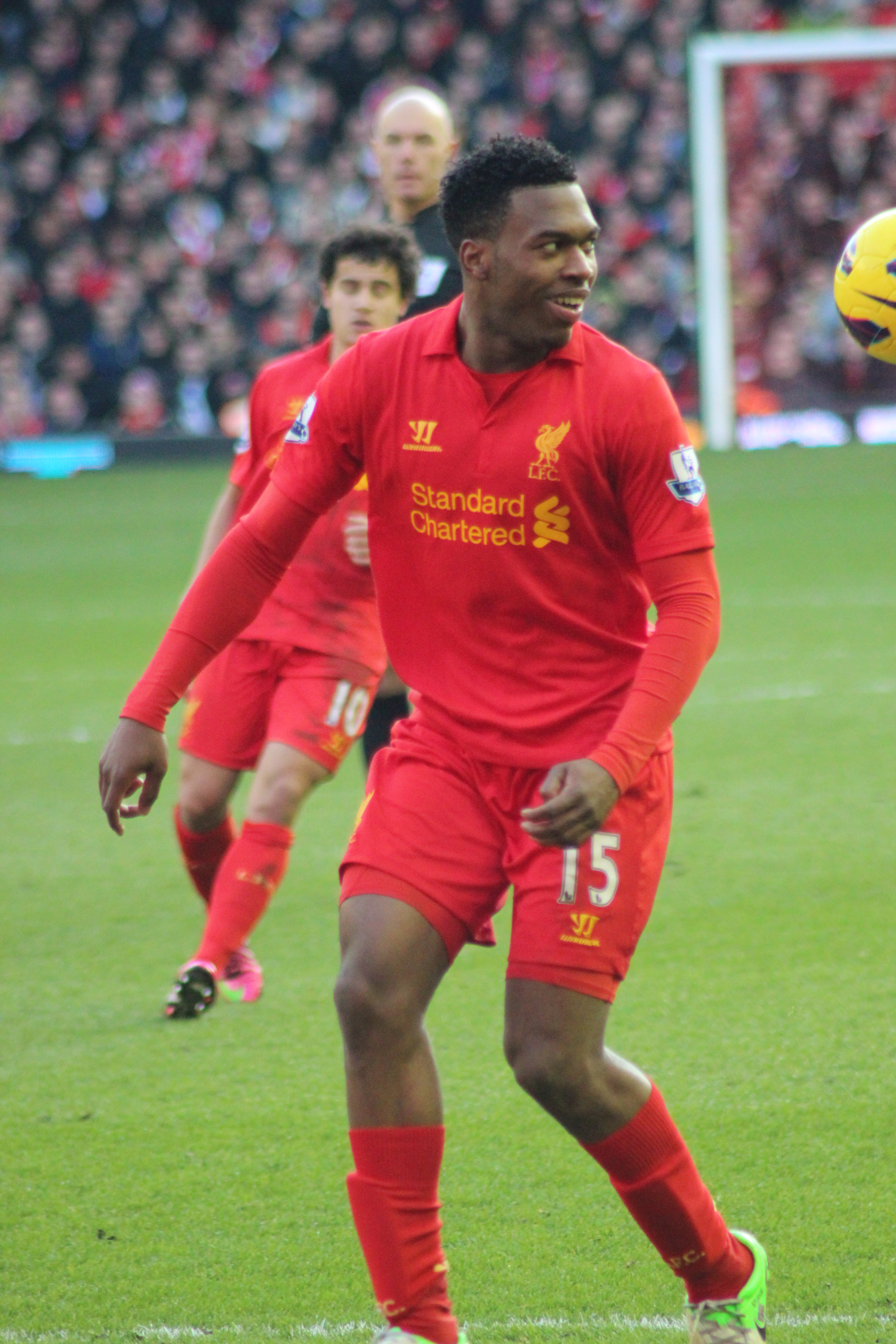
Sturridge playing for Liverpool in 2013

On 2 January 2013, Sturridge completed a move from Chelsea to Liverpool, signing a long-term contract for an undisclosed fee thought to be in the region of £12 million. He made his debut on 6 January against Mansfield Town in the FA Cup third round, scoring his first Liverpool goal after just seven minutes in a match which Liverpool won 2–1. He scored on his league debut after coming on as a half-time substitute the following weekend, scoring in a 2–1 defeat against rivals and league leaders Manchester United at Old Trafford on 13 January. Sturridge scored his third goal for Liverpool in his first league start and home debut for the club, a 5–0 win against Norwich City at Anfield on 19 January. With the goal, he had scored three goals in his first three appearances for the club, becoming the first Liverpool player since Ray Kennedy in 1974 to accomplish the feat, despite not yet playing a full 90 minutes for the club.

On 3 February, Sturridge scored a goal from 25 yards-out against former club Manchester City in a 2–2 draw at the City of Manchester Stadium. Sturridge continued this run of form on 17 February, with an assist for teammate José Enrique, as well as scoring a penalty against Swansea City in a 5–0 win, having missed the prior two matches due to a combination of ineligibility and injury. He also scored against former club Chelsea in a 2–2 draw at Anfield, the match of teammate Luis Suárez's biting incident with Blues defender Branislav Ivanović, which led to a ten-match ban for Suárez. Sturridge scored two goals and notched an assist in a 6–0 win over Newcastle United on 27 April at St James' Park. On 12 May, he scored his first career hat-trick, in a 3–1 win against Fulham at Craven Cottage.

==== 2013–14 season ====
Sturridge began the 2013–14 season by scoring the first goal of the season – which also turned out to be the only goal in Liverpool's 1–0 win over Stoke City – with a shot from outside the box. He then followed this up with a goal against Aston Villa in another 1–0 win and a brace against Notts County in the League Cup, taking his season's tally to four goals in three matches. He continued his fine form by scoring the only goal in a 1–0 win against fierce rivals and defending champions Manchester United on his 24th birthday at Anfield, and giving a man of the match performance in a 3–1 win away at Sunderland by scoring and providing two assists for Luis Suárez. These performances earned Sturridge the season's first Premier League Player of the Month award for the month of August. On 23 November, he came off the bench to score a last-minute equaliser against Everton in a thrilling Merseyside derby that finished 3–3.

Sturridge's impressive goal-scoring form continued into the new year, with Sturridge becoming the first Liverpool player in the Premier League era to score in seven consecutive league matches when he found the net at Craven Cottage against Fulham. He went on to become only the second player in Premier League history to score eight matches in a row after a brace against Swansea City in a 4–3 home win. He was then named Player of the Month for the second time in the season for February, scoring five goals and earned two assists during the month.

On 18 April, Sturridge was named as one of the six players on the shortlist for the PFA Players' Player of the Year award and was also nominated for the PFA Young Player of the Year award. On 27 April, he was named alongside teammates Steven Gerrard and Luis Suárez in the PFA Team of the Year. Sturridge's haul of 21 league goals made him the runner-up in the season's Premier League Golden Boot, behind strike partner Suárez.

==== 2014–15 season ====
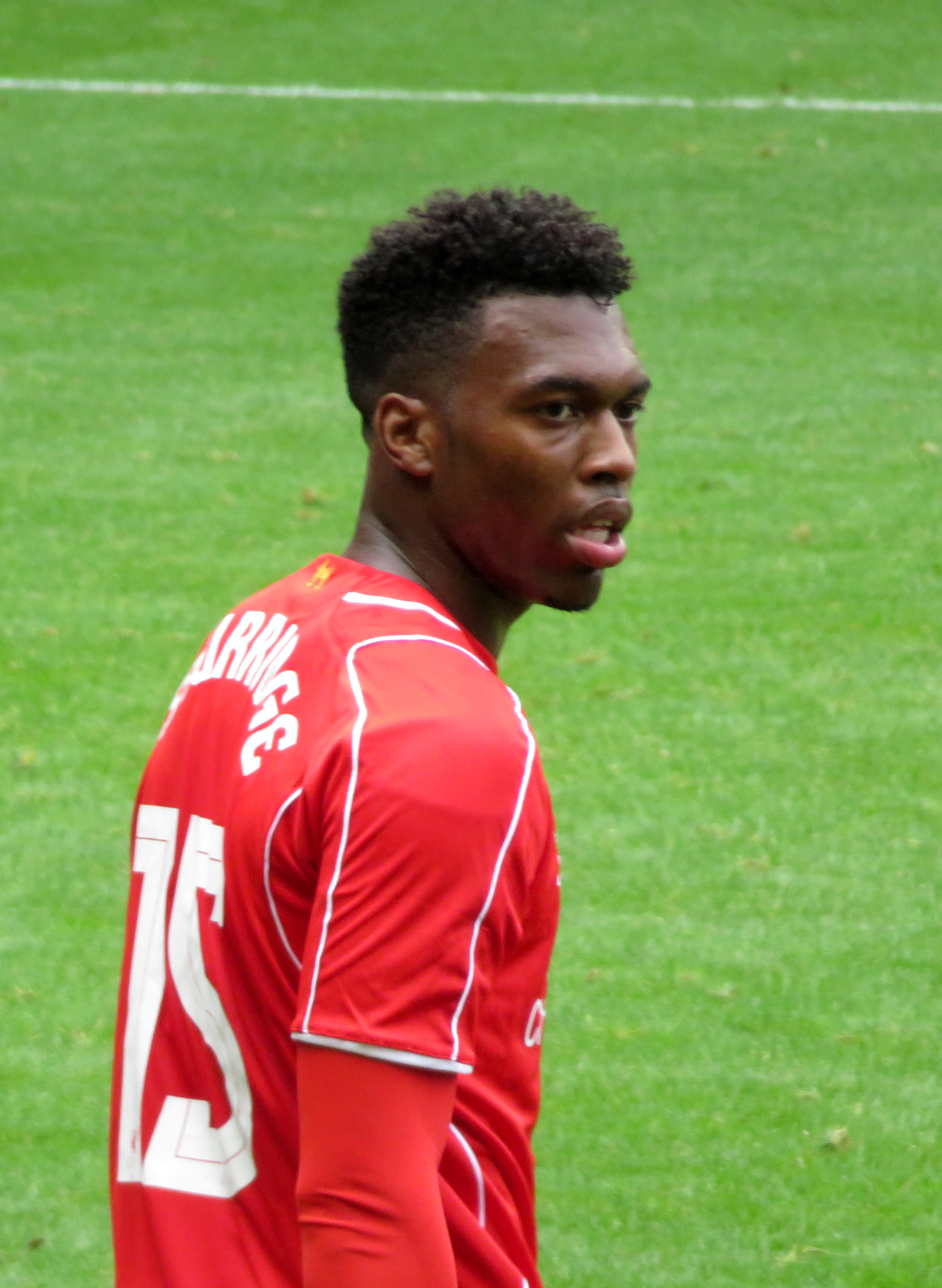
Sturridge playing for Liverpool in 2014

Sturridge started the 2014–15 season scoring a late winner in Liverpool's opening match, a 2–1 win over Southampton. While on international duty in September 2014, Sturridge incurred a thigh injury and forced out of action for up to three weeks. On 11 September, manager Brendan Rodgers publicly criticised England's handling of Sturridge, stating his injury "could have been preventable." Despite rumours, England manager Roy Hodgson rejected talk of a rift between him and Rodgers over Sturridge's injury. Sturridge was ruled out for another three more weeks after suffering a calf strain injury during training on 17 October. On 18 November, he broke down in training with a new thigh injury which saw him miss the next six weeks.

After missing close to five months, Sturridge made his return to the team on 31 January in a 2–0 win over West Ham as a 68th-minute substitute for Lazar Marković, scoring in the 87th minute after a through ball from Philippe Coutinho. On 4 March, Sturridge scored the second goal in a 2–0 win over Burnley. Sturridge's injury-plagued season continued when he picked up a hip injury on 22 March in a 2–1 loss to rivals Manchester United, despite scoring Liverpool's lone goal. On 5 May, he underwent a successful hip operation in the United States that ruled him out until September, meaning he would miss the start of the new season.

==== 2015–16 season ====
After missing the first five matches of Liverpool's Premier League campaign due to injury, Sturridge made his first appearance of the season against Norwich City on 20 September 2015. He scored his first two goals of the season in a 3–2 victory against Aston Villa on 26 September. On 15 October, Sturridge suffered a knee injury in training that would rule him out another four weeks. On 2 December, he scored two goals in a 6–1 away win over Southampton in the quarter-final of the League Cup. Four days later he suffered another hamstring injury in a 2–0 defeat to Newcastle United, that ruled him out for two months. He returned to the team on 14 February 2016, scoring in a 6–0 win over Aston Villa at Villa Park. 14 days later, he started in the 2016 League Cup final loss to Manchester City, playing the full 120 minutes as Liverpool were defeated in a penalty shoot-out.

On 10 March 2016, he scored his first Europa League goal for Liverpool in a 2–0 win over rivals Manchester United at Anfield. He scored his 50th goal for Liverpool in all competitions on 20 April, in a 4–0 win at home in the Merseyside derby; he is the fourth fastest Liverpool player to reach that landmark, doing so in 87 appearances. On 5 May 2016, Sturridge scored his 12th goal of the season in Liverpool's 3–0 win over Villarreal in the Europa League semi-final second leg to qualify the team for the 2016 UEFA Europa League final. On 19 May, Sturridge scored the opening goal of the Europa League final, an eventual 3–1 loss to Sevilla in Basel. Sturridge ended the season as Liverpool's top scorer with 13 goals.

==== 2016–2018 ====
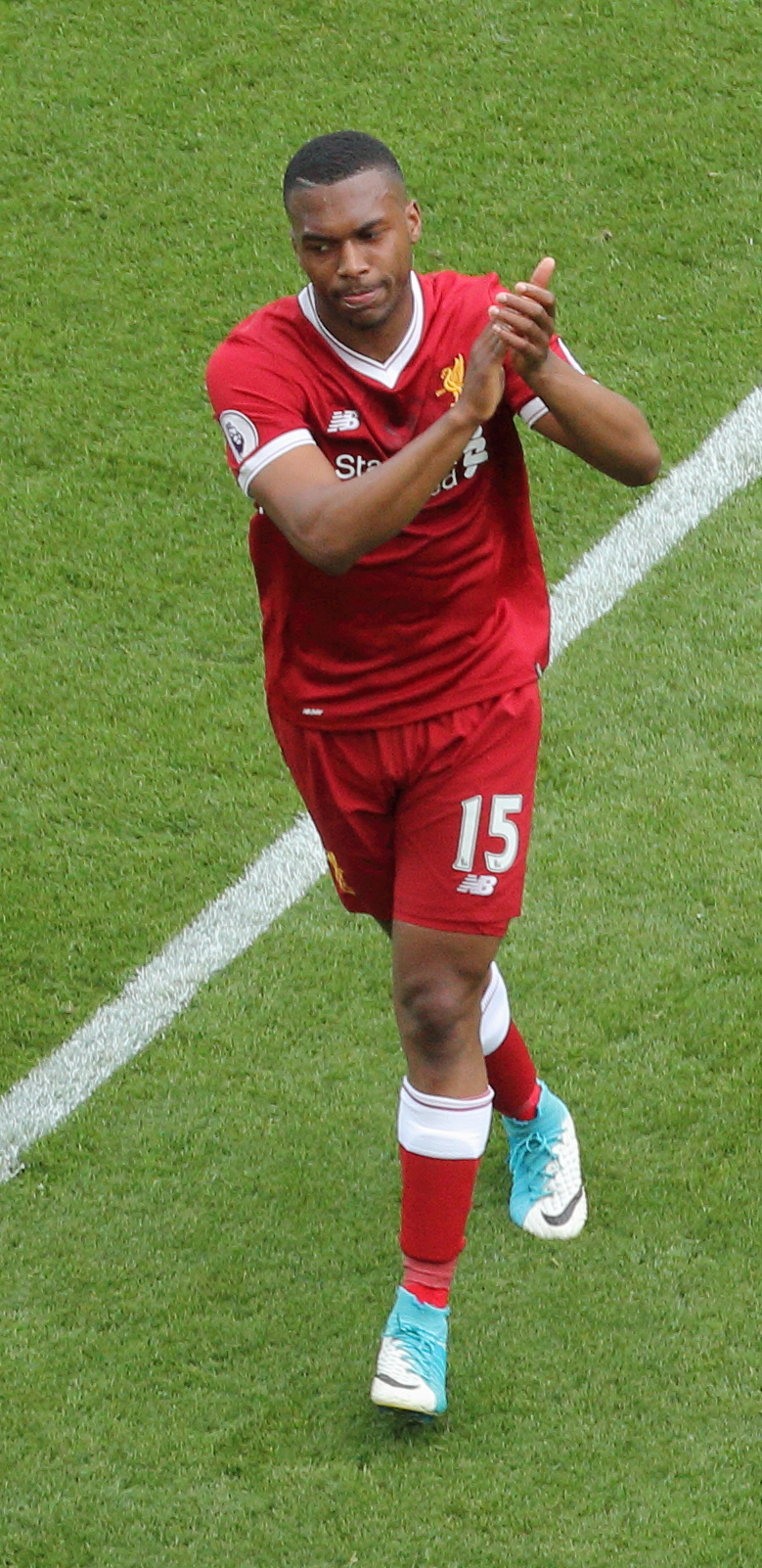
Sturridge playing for Liverpool in 2017

Sturridge began the season as an understudy to Roberto Firmino and generally came off the bench during the second half in league matches. On 23 August, Sturridge started the match against Burton Albion in the EFL Cup and scored a brace in the 5–0 win for Liverpool. Sturridge started in the fourth round of the EFL Cup against Tottenham on 25 October and scored a brace in a 2–1 win for Liverpool at Anfield. He scored his first league goal of the season on 27 December, scoring within one minute of coming on as a second-half substitute against Stoke. Sturridge's goal, Liverpool's fourth on the night and 86th for the year, saw the club break its record for goals scored in a calendar year.

On 27 August 2017, Sturridge scored in a 4–0 win over Arsenal, just three minutes after coming on as a substitute. On 28 October, he scored the opening goal in a 3–0 win over Huddersfield Town. On 1 November, he scored in a 3–0 win over Maribor in the UEFA Champions League.

On 29 January 2018, Sturridge joined West Bromwich Albion on loan for the remainder of the 2017–18 season. On 12 February, in just his third appearance for West Brom since joining on loan, Sturridge suffered a hamstring injury after three minutes of playing in a 3–0 away defeat to Chelsea.

==== 2018–19 season ====
Back in Liverpool colours, on 12 August 2018, Sturridge scored with his first touch after 24 seconds coming on as a substitute in a 4–0 win over West Ham United. On 18 September, he scored the opening goal of a 3–2 win over Paris Saint-Germain in the opening match of the UEFA Champions League. On 26 September, he scored the opening goal against his former club Chelsea in the EFL Cup third round, though Liverpool eventually lost the match 1–2. Three days later Sturridge scored the equalising goal – and 50th league goal of his Liverpool career – with a 25-yard curler in the 89th minute to earn a 1–1 draw with Chelsea at Stamford Bridge, which was later voted as Premier League Goal of the Month for September.

Despite not playing in the 2019 UEFA Champions League final against Tottenham Hotspur on 1 June 2019, Sturridge picked up his second Champions League winner's medal and became the first Englishman to win the competition with two different English clubs. Three days later, he and Alberto Moreno were both released by Liverpool.

On 18 July 2019, Sturridge was banned from football for six weeks, four of which were suspended, for breaching betting rules after instructing his brother to bet on a possible transfer to Sevilla.

=== Later career ===
Sturridge signed for Turkish Süper Lig club Trabzonspor on 21 August 2019 on a three-year contract. On 2 March 2020, Sturridge was released from the club after having his contract mutually terminated; he had scored seven goals in sixteen games. The same day he received a four-month worldwide ban for breaching betting rules (see previous section); an appeal board also fined him £150,000.

On 1 October 2021, A-League Men club Perth Glory announced the signing of Sturridge for the 2021–22 season. Perth chairman and owner Tony Sage described the signing as one of the biggest in A-League history, while Sturridge said he had not joined the club for "a holiday". He only began training with his new team in mid-November due to fitness struggles, and said he could not put a timeframe on how long it would take to return to full fitness.

Sturridge made his debut for Perth Glory on 20 November 2021, coming on as an 84th-minute substitute against Adelaide United, in front of a near-capacity crowd of 17,198 at Perth Oval. On 23 February 2022, Sturridge suffered a groin injury having come on as a substitute during a 1–0 defeat to Macarthur, and was himself substituted after 18 minutes of game time. Perth's chief executive Tony Pignata admitted the move had not worked, describing it as "disappointing". On 3 June, it was announced that he had been released by new manager Ruben Zadkovich, having started just one game and scored no goals in six appearances.

== International career ==
=== Youth ===
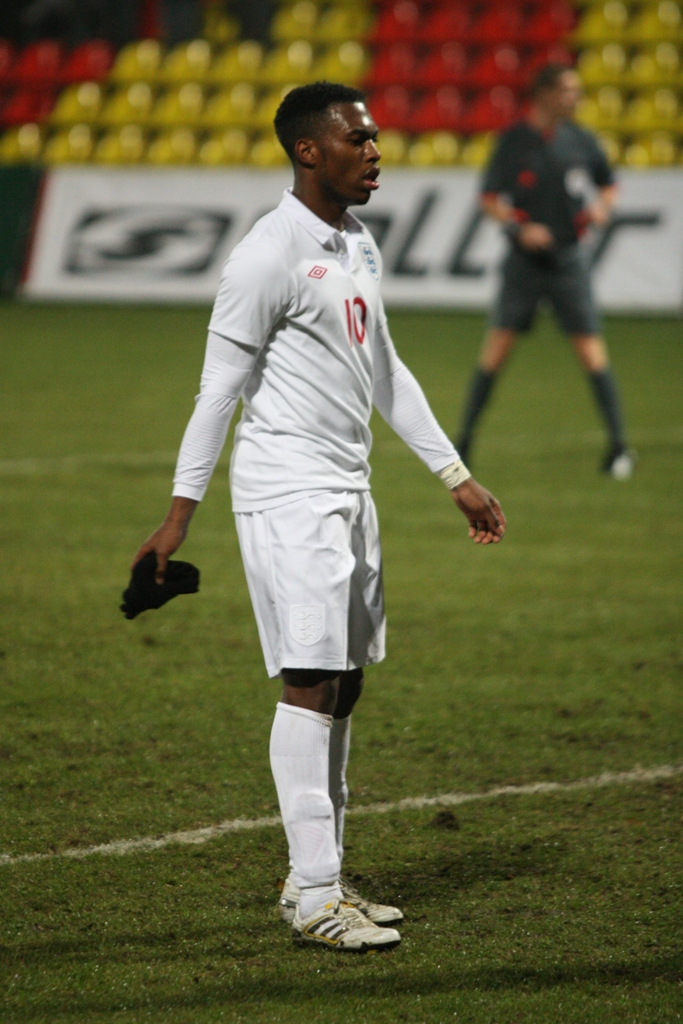
Sturridge playing for England U21s in 2009

Sturridge has represented England at U16, U17, U18, U19, U20 and U21 levels. He scored twice against the Netherlands for the under-18 team in 2007, netting again in the Under-19 European Championships against the Netherlands. He scored the only goal for England U21 in a 1–1 draw against Greece U-21 in Greece and scored his second U-21 goal in the 1–0 win over Portugal.

He was named in the England under-21 squad for the 2011 UEFA European Under-21 Championship. England was eliminated in the group stages. Sturridge was selected to the team of the tournament.

=== Senior ===
On 6 November 2011, Sturridge was handed his maiden England call-up by being named in the England squad for the friendlies against Spain and Sweden, after excelling for Chelsea. He was an unused substitute in a 1–0 victory against Spain, but Fabio Capello insisted that Sturridge would play against Sweden the following Tuesday and did, as he made his debut coming on as a second-half substitute for Theo Walcott. He made his second appearance against the Netherlands coming on in the first half for the injured Steven Gerrard and caused the Dutch defence problems throughout the match and earned the man of the match award for his efforts during the match.

He scored his first senior goal for England in his fifth match on 22 March 2013, after coming on for Wayne Rooney in an 8–0 away win against San Marino in World Cup qualification. The goal meant he had made an appearance and scored for all levels of international football for England, from U16 to the seniors, as well as scoring for the Great Britain Olympic football team. On 11 October, he scored another goal in England's qualification campaign, an injury-time penalty in a 4–1 win over Montenegro after he had been fouled by Ivan Kecojević. He scored again in the opening match of 2014, England's March friendly with Denmark. The score was 0–0 until the eighty-second minute, when Sturridge rose to head an Adam Lallana cross into the net for a late winner.

On 2 July 2012, Sturridge was named in Stuart Pearce's 18-man squad for the Great Britain Olympic football team to compete at the 2012 Summer Olympics. It was however, announced on 3 July 2012 that Sturridge was undergoing tests for suspected meningitis, and was possibly going to be unable to compete in the GB 2012 team. However, he made a full recovery meaning he could take part and he scored his first goal for Great Britain in the second group match, a 3–1 victory over the United Arab Emirates. In the final group match, Sturridge scored the only goal as Great Britain beat Uruguay to finish top of their group and progress to the quarter-final. In the quarter-final match against South Korea, Sturridge missed the fifth penalty for Great Britain. South Korea then scored theirs, knocking out Team GB.

In May 2014, Sturridge was named in England's squad for the 2014 FIFA World Cup and assigned the number 9 shirt. He scored the team's opening goal in a 3–0 friendly victory over Peru at Wembley Stadium on 30 May. On 14 June, Sturridge started England's opening match of the tournament and scored the team's goal in a 2–1 defeat by Italy in Manaus.

Despite injury keeping him out of most of UEFA Euro 2016 qualifying, Sturridge was named in England's squad for the UEFA Euro 2016 finals. In the team's second group match, after appearing as a half time substitute against Wales, Sturridge assisted Jamie Vardy's equaliser and scored the winning goal as the team recovered from a 1–0 deficit.

== Style of play ==
Former Chelsea manager André Villas-Boas said, "Daniel offers a few of the characteristics I had with Hulk when I was with him in Porto... He is an extremely quick player, and he has technique at pace."

Sturridge said he preferred to play as a centre-forward rather than as a winger: "I do still see myself as a striker but I am doing a job for the team and I'm enjoying doing it." As Sturridge transitioned from a wider role into a striker when he joined Liverpool, Sturridge also said that he likens himself on striker Thierry Henry, who "played wide for Juventus and then went to Arsenal and played as a centre-forward."

Although he rarely played for Chelsea as a striker, Liverpool manager Brendan Rodgers played Sturridge as a striker in most matches. His ability to still drop between lines and pull wide and attack defences, similar to former strike partner Luis Suárez's playing-style, has led to Rodgers describing him as "what I call a 'nine-and-a-half".

== Personal life ==
Sturridge was raised in Birmingham but when signed by Manchester City the family moved to Congleton where he attended Congleton High School.

Sturridge is a Christian. After winning the Premier League Player of the Month award, Sturridge said, "I do all [through] Christ who strengthens me." He is actively involved in charity work, often helping young players get involved in football. In November 2012, while playing for Chelsea, he presented a cheque for €50,000 on behalf of Hyundai to Street League, a charity dedicated to helping disadvantaged players across Europe get into football. In June 2013, he presented a further cheque of £50,000 to Street League, whilst visiting their new centre in Liverpool. Later that same month, Sturridge opened his charity foundation named after him in Portmore, Jamaica, with its aim to help youngsters there get into sport and entertainment. He also owns the Sturr Class Entertainment record company.

In 2019, Sturridge's home in Los Angeles was broken into, and his Pomeranian dog, Lucci, was lost, and he offered a reward for the dog's return. Shortly after, Foster Washington of Los Angeles claimed to have found the dog and returned him to Sturridge. In March 2021, Washington filed a suit against Sturridge and was awarded $30,000 in damages on 22 December 2021. In response, Sturridge claimed that another person found and returned the dog and was rewarded for doing so.

== Career statistics ==
=== Club ===
Appearances and goals by club, season and competition
Club	Season	League			National cup (Note: Includes FA Cup, Turkish cup)		League Cup (Note: Includes Football League/EFL Cup)		Europe		Other		Total	
Club	Season	Division	Apps	Goals	Apps	Goals	Apps	Goals	Apps	Goals	Apps	Goals	Apps	Goals
Manchester City	2006–07	Premier League	2	0	0	0	0	0	—		—		2	0
Manchester City	2007–08	Premier League	3	1	1	1	0	0	—		—		4	2
Manchester City	2008–09	Premier League	16	4	1	0	1	0	8 (Note: Appearances in UEFA Cup)	0	—		26	4
Manchester City	Total		21	5	2	1	1	0	8	0	—		32	6
Chelsea	2009–10	Premier League	13	1	4	4	1	0	2 (Note: Appearances in UEFA Champions League)	0	0	0	20	5
Chelsea	2010–11	Premier League	13	0	1	2	1	0	5	2	1 (Note: Appearance in FA Community Shield)	0	21	4
Chelsea	2011–12	Premier League	30	11	4	1	2	1	7	0	—		43	13
Chelsea	2012–13	Premier League	7	1	—		1	1	2	0	2 (Note: One appearance in FA Community Shield, one appearance in UEFA Super Cup)	0	12	2
Chelsea	Total		63	13	9	7	5	2	16	2	3	0	96	24
Bolton Wanderers (loan)	2010–11	Premier League	12	8	—		—		—		—		12	8
Liverpool	2012–13	Premier League	14	10	2	1	—		—		—		16	11
Liverpool	2013–14	Premier League	29	21	2	1	2	2	—		—		33	24
Liverpool	2014–15	Premier League	12	4	4	1	0	0	2 (Note: Appearances in UEFA Europa League)	0	—		18	5
Liverpool	2015–16	Premier League	14	8	1	0	2	2	8	3	—		25	13
Liverpool	2016–17	Premier League	20	3	3	0	4	4	—		—		27	7
Liverpool	2017–18	Premier League	9	2	0	0	0	0	5	1	—		14	3
Liverpool	2018–19	Premier League	18	2	1	0	1	1	7	1	—		27	4
Liverpool	Total		116	50	13	3	9	9	22	5	—		160	67
West Bromwich Albion (loan)	2017–18	Premier League	6	0	0	0	—		—		—		6	0
Trabzonspor	2019–20	Süper Lig	11	4	3	3	—		2	0	—		16	7
Perth Glory	2021–22	A-League Men	6	0	0	0	—		—		—		6	0
Career total			235	80	27	14	15	11	48	7	3	0	328	112

=== International ===
Appearances and goals by national team and year
National team	Year	Apps	Goals
England	2011	1	0
England	2012	3	0
England	2013	5	2
England	2014	7	3
England	2016	9	3
England	2017	1	0
Total		26	8

England score listed first, score column indicates score after each Sturridge goal

List of international goals scored by Daniel Sturridge
No.	Date	Venue	Cap	Opponent	Score	Result	Competition	Ref.
1	22 March 2013	Stadio Olimpico di Serravalle, Serravalle, San Marino	5	San Marino	7–0	8–0	2014 FIFA World Cup qualification	
2	11 October 2013	Wembley Stadium, London, England	7	Montenegro	4–1	4–1	2014 FIFA World Cup qualification	
3	5 March 2014	Wembley Stadium, London, England	10	Denmark	1–0	1–0	Friendly	
4	30 May 2014	Wembley Stadium, London, England	11	Peru	1–0	3–0	Friendly	
5	14 June 2014	Arena da Amazônia, Manaus, Brazil	13	Italy	1–1	1–2	2014 FIFA World Cup	
6	16 June 2016	Stade Bollaert-Delelis, Lens, France	19	Wales	2–1	2–1	UEFA Euro 2016	
7	8 October 2016	Wembley Stadium, London, England	23	Malta	1–0	2–0	2018 FIFA World Cup qualification	
8	11 November 2016	Wembley Stadium, London, England	25	Scotland	1–0	3–0	2018 FIFA World Cup qualification	

== Honours ==
Chelsea

- Premier League: 2009–10
- FA Cup: 2009–10, 2011–12
- UEFA Champions League: 2011–12

Liverpool

- UEFA Champions League: 2018–19
- Football League Cup runner-up: 2015–16
- UEFA Europa League runner-up: 2015–16

Individual

- PFA Team of the Year: 2013–14 Premier League
- UEFA European Under-21 Championship Team of the Tournament: 2011
- Premier League Player of the Month: August 2013, February 2014
- Premier League Goal of the Month: September 2018
