= Mike Sturridge =

English footballer

Personal information
- Full name: Michael Alexander Sturridge
- Date of birth: 18 September 1962 (age 64)
- Place of birth: Birmingham, England
- Position: Forward

Youth career
- Birmingham City

Senior career*
Years	Team	Apps	(Gls)
	Birmingham City	0	(0)
1983–1984	→ Wrexham (loan)	4	(0)
1986–1987	Nuneaton Borough		
- * Club domestic league appearances and goals

Michael Alexander Sturridge (born 18 September 1962) is an English former footballer who played as a forward. Originally on the books of Birmingham City, he did not make a professional appearance for the club and only played a handful of games for Wrexham and Nuneaton Borough before retiring. He later became a youth football scout.

== Playing career ==
Sturridge made four appearances in the English Football League whilst on loan from Birmingham City at Welsh club Wrexham. He later played for Nuneaton Borough in the 1986–87 season but was released after a few months by manager Jimmy Holmes.

== Personal life ==
He is the father of former Liverpool and England international forward Daniel Sturridge and the brother of former footballers Dean and Simon Sturridge.
