= Archange Nkumu =

English footballer

Personal information
- Date of birth: 5 November 1993 (age 33)
- Place of birth: Tottenham, England
- Height: 1.88 m (6 ft 2 in)
- Positions: Defender; midfielder

Youth career
- 2003–2012: Chelsea

Senior career*
Years	Team	Apps	(Gls)
2012–2013	Chelsea	0	(0)
2012	→ Yeovil Town (loan)	1	(0)
2012–2013	→ Colchester United (loan)	0	(0)
2013	Concord Rangers	0	(0)
2015–2019	KA	69	(4)
2019	Haringey Borough	0	(0)
2019	Þróttur Reykjavík	14	(0)
Total		87	(4)
- * Club domestic league appearances and goals as of 08:16, 26 April 2023 (UTC)

Archange Nkumu (born 5 November 1993) is an English professional footballer who plays as a defender or midfielder.

== Career ==
=== Chelsea ===
Archange joined the Chelsea Academy at the age of 10 and has been used in both midfield and defensive positions while progressing through the ranks at the club. He has travelled and been a part of various overseas tournaments with the academy, including the 2010 Dallas Cup.

In the 2010-11 Archange started being picked for reserve team matches, and scored his first goal away at Manchester United in April 2011. Another high point for Nkumu was that he started in the second leg of the 2011-12 FA Youth Cup final, which Chelsea went on and won. He was released by Chelsea in May 2013.

==== Loan spells ====
On 23 August 2012, Nkumu joined League One side Yeovil Town on a one-month loan spell. Nkumu made his professional debut on 18 September 2012 in a 4–1 loss against Leyton Orient as a late substitute.

On 23 October 2012, Nkumu signed on loan for Colchester United until 14 January 2013, but returned a month early, on 1 December 2012.

At the end of April 2019, Nkumu joined Þróttur Reykjavík after a short period at the English club Haringey Borough.

=== Iceland ===
In 2015, Nkumu joined 1. deild karla side KA, making 69 league appearances in four seasons with the club, helping them to promotion in his second season. On 19 April 2019, Nkumu left KA to join second-tier side Þróttur Reykjavík.

== International career ==
Born in England, Nkumu is of DR Congolese descent. He was called up to a training camp for the DR Congo U18s in February 2011.
