= 2009–10 FA Youth Cup =

Tournament details
- Teams: 466

Final positions
- Champions: Chelsea (3rd Title)
- Runners-up: Aston Villa (3rd Runner Up Finish)

The FA Youth Cup sponsored by E.ON 2009–10 was the 58th edition of the FA Youth Cup.

467 clubs were initially accepted, although there was one withdrawal, Worcester City 53 of the remaining 466 teams were new entries.

Holders Arsenal were knocked out in the fourth Round at home to Ipswich Town 0–2.

Chelsea won the competition by beating Aston Villa 3–2 on aggregate to win the competition for only their third time in their history and for the first time since 1961.

== First round ==
Tie no	Home team	Score	Away team	Attendance
1	Oldham Athletic	4 – 1	Stalybridge Celtic	279
2	Accrington Stanley	1 – 1(P8–9)	Carlisle United	103
3	Darlington	1 – 2	Huddersfield Town	120
4	Maidstone United	3 – 5	Wycombe Wanderers	246
5	AFC Wimbledon	2 – 1	Sutton United	209
6	Malvern Town	0 – 1	Notts County	140
7	Bury Town	3 – 2	Walsall	141
8	Woking	3 – 1	Dagenham & Redbridge	187
9	Bishop's Stortford	7 – 1	Marlow	121
10	Ebbsfleet United	2 – 1	Brentford	180
11	Dulwich Hamlet	1 – 1(P2–4)	Norwich City	112
12	Congleton Town	0 – 3	Rochdale	201
13	Carlton Town	2 – 1	Burton Albion	108
14	Atherstone Town	2 – 0	Highgate United	90
15	VT	2 – 3	Torquay United	138
16	Bradford City	3 – 1	Southport	184
17	Milton Keynes Dons	2 – 1	Dunstable Town	609
18	Barnet	0 – 4	Brighton & Hove Albion	352
19	Aldershot Town	0 – 4	Southampton	179
20	Histon	0 – 4	Cambridge United	313

Tie no	Home team	Score	Away team	Attendance
21	Tranmere Rovers	3 – 0	Farsley Celtic	271
22	St Albans City	1 – 0	Colchester United	133
23	Oxford United	5 – 2	Gloucester City	135
24	Macclesfield Town	2 – 0	Bury	160
25	Hartlepool United	3 – 1	Lincoln City	95
26	Grimsby Town	1 – 2	York City	125
27	Leeds United	0 – 1	Crewe Alexandra	241
28	Chester City	0 – 4	Morecambe	87
29	Rotherham United	3 – 3(P3–4)	Stockport County	144
30	Charlton Athletic	3 – 0	Gillingham	846
31	Leyton Orient	2 – 1	Bromley	196
32	Millwall	3 – 1	Southend United	352
33	Bristol Rovers	1 – 3	AFC Bournemouth	238
34	Basingstoke Town	3 – 4	Hereford United	138
35	Swindon Town	6 – 0	Yeovil Town	223
36	Forest Green Rovers	1 – 2	Farnborough	96
37	Rushden & Diamonds	1 – 2	Northampton Town	432
38	Shrewsbury Town	2 – 1	Port Vale	197
39	Exeter City	0 – 4	Cheltenham Town	461
40	Chesterfield	4 – 1	Mansfield Town	341

== Second round ==
Tie no	Home team	Score	Away team	Attendance
1	Stockport County	2 – 0	Carlton Town	116
2	Huddersfield Town	5 – 0	Atherstone Town	189
3	Bradford City	1 – 2	Crewe Alexandra	293
4	Oldham Athletic	3 – 5	Rochdale	312
5	Brighton & Hove Albion	2 – 0	Ebbsfleet United	94
6	Northampton Town	2 – 1	Chesterfield	203
7	AFC Wimbledon	0 – 5	AFC Bournemouth	210
8	Torquay United	1 – 0	Norwich City	546
9	York City	1 – 2	Carlisle United	264
10	Tranmere Rovers	3 – 1	Cambridge United	242

Tie no	Home team	Score	Away team	Attendance
11	Southampton	6 – 0	Hereford United	345
12	Swindon Town	1 – 2	Leyton Orient	337
13	Charlton Athletic	3 – 1	Woking	553
14	Bury Town	1 – 1(P4–3)	Macclesfield Town	258
15	St Albans City	2 – 2(P2–4)	Wycombe Wanderers	217
16	Notts County	0 – 2	Hartlepool United	341
17	Millwall	1 – 0	Oxford United	233
18	Milton Keynes Dons	2 – 1	Bishop's Stortford	317
19	Shrewsbury Town	5 – 2	Morecambe	187
20	Cheltenham Town	3 – 2	Farnborough	213

== Third round ==
The 20 Premier League and 24 Championship teams enter at this stage, along with the winners of the second round.

Tie no	Home team	Score	Away team	Attendance
1	Bolton Wanderers	3 – 1	AFC Bournemouth	530
2	Torquay United	1 – 3	Millwall	564
3	Stockport County	0 – 3	Fulham	101
4	Arsenal	3 – 3(P5–4)	Crewe Alexandra	335
5	Northampton Town	1 – 3	Brighton & Hove Albion	174
6	Charlton Athletic	1 – 2	Chelsea	1,033
7	Manchester United	2 – 0	Birmingham City	635
8	Derby County	6 – 1	Peterborough United	303
9	Wigan Athletic	0 – 1	Tottenham Hotspur	721
10	Cheltenham Town	1 – 2	Reading	310
11	Nottingham Forest	5 – 2	Bury Town	384
12	Crystal Palace	3 – 2	Bristol City	567
13	Plymouth Argyle	0 – 1	West Ham United	1,500
14	Portsmouth	1 – 0	Huddersfield Town	350
15	Aston Villa	4 – 0	Rochdale	723
16	Blackburn Rovers	3 – 0	Blackpool	452

Tie no	Home team	Score	Away team	Attendance
17	Middlesbrough	0 – 1	Everton	100
18	Scunthorpe United	1 – 4	Burnley	273
19	Sheffield Wednesday	2 – 7	Sunderland	190
20	Carlisle United	0 – 1	Stoke City	204
21	Queens Park Rangers	3 – 1	Southampton	414
22	Shrewsbury Town	1 – 2	Hull City	245
23	Milton Keynes Dons	1 – 3	Leyton Orient	240
24	Hartlepool United	2 – 1	Sheffield United	143
25	Doncaster Rovers	0 – 3	Newcastle United	525
26	Cardiff City	1 – 2	Barnsley	475
27	Swansea City	0 – 3	West Bromwich Albion	139
28	Preston North End	2 – 1	Manchester City	590
29	Coventry City	2 – 3	Leicester City	356
30	Liverpool	2 – 0	Wolverhampton Wanderers	1,141
31	Watford	3 – 0	Wycombe Wanderers	686
32	Tranmere Rovers	0 – 2	Ipswich Town	247

== Fourth round ==
Tie no	Home team	Score	Away team
1	Stoke City	1 – 2	Hull City
2	Crystal Palace	2 – 0	Derby County
3	Brighton & Hove Albion	0 – 2	Everton
4	Millwall	5 – 4(AET)	Barnsley
5	Sunderland	2 – 2(P0–3)	Preston North End
6	West Ham United	3 – 0	Queens Park Rangers
7	Hartlepool United	0 – 2	Watford
8	Bolton Wanderers	2 – 2(P3–5)	Fulham

Tie no	Home team	Score	Away team
9	Arsenal	0 – 2	Ipswich Town
10	Blackburn Rovers	1 – 0	Leyton Orient
11	West Bromwich Albion	0 – 2	Aston Villa
12	Reading	1 – 3	Newcastle United
13	Burnley	1 – 5	Manchester United
14	Leicester City	1 – 5	Liverpool
15	Nottingham Forest	0 – 4	Chelsea
16	Tottenham Hoptsur	0 – 1	Portsmouth

11 January 2010	Tottenham	0 – 1	Portsmouth	White Hart Lane, London
			Çiftçi 60'

12 January 2010	Nottingham Forest	0 – 4	Chelsea	City Ground, Nottingham
			Mills Pappoe 8'; Mitrović 74', 88'; Clifford 83'	Attendance: 786

12 January 2010	Leicester City	1 – 5	Liverpool	Walkers Stadium, Leicester
	Yussuf 68'		Dalla Valle 5', 7', 33'; Ince 30'; Ngoo 85'

13 January 2010	Burnley	1 – 5	Manchester United	Turf Moor, Burnley
	Anderson (red card) 70'; McKee 84'		Petrucci 22'; King 28', 51'; Keane 34', 88'	Attendance: 1,036

13 January 2010	Reading	1 – 3	Newcastle United	Madejski Stadium, Reading
	Walcott 47' (pen.)		Inman 10'; Airey 44' (pen.)

15 January 2010	West Bromwich Albion	0 – 2	Aston Villa	The Hawthorns, Birmingham
			Gardner 58'; Halfhuid 70'	Attendance: 515

15 January 2010	Bolton Wanderers	2 – 2 (a.e.t.) (3 – 5 p)	Fulham	Reebok Stadium, Bolton
	McGeechan 30'; Irwin 97'		Trotta 10'; Harris 92'
	Penalties
	(penalty scored) (penalty scored) (penalty scored); Campbell (penalty missed)		(penalty scored) (penalty scored) (penalty scored) (penalty scored); (penalty scored) Harris

18 January 2010	Blackburn Rovers	1 – 0	Leyton Orient	Ewood Park, Blackburn
	Banton 71' (pen.)

19 January 2010	West Ham United	3 – 0	Queens Park Rangers	Upton Park, London
	Montano 20', 76'; Hall 43'			Attendance: 972

19 January 2010	Arsenal	0 – 2	Ipswich Town	Underhill, Barnet
			Murray 10'; Wickham 11'

20 January 2010	Millwall	5 – 4 (a.e.t.)	Barnsley	The New Den, London
	Ludford 49'; Marquis 66'; Hughes-Mason 101', 120'; Fitzsimons 111'		O'Neill 23'; Dean (red card) 33'; Teiman 45+2'; Fearnehough 92'; Crapper 105'

20 January 2010	Sunderland	2 – 2 (a.e.t.) (0 – 3 p)	Preston North End	Stadium of Light, Sunderland
	Noble 5'; Lynch 93'		Proctor 89'; Dougan 119'
	Penalties
	Armstrong (penalty missed); Adams (penalty missed); Lynch (penalty missed)		(penalty scored) Owens; (penalty scored) Proctor; (penalty scored) Hart

21 January 2010	Brighton & Hove Albion	0 – 2	Everton	Withdean Stadium, Brighton
			Duffy 13'; Forshaw 88'	Attendance: 915

22 January 2010	Hartlepool United	0 – 2	Watford	Victoria Park, Hartlepool
			Murray 13', 45'

25 January 2010	Crystal Palace	2 – 0	Derby County	Selhurst Park, London
	Zaha 30'; Goldsmith 39'			Attendance: 637

26 January 2010	Stoke City	1 – 2	Hull City	Britannia Stadium, Stoke-on-Trent
	Moult 41'		Cullen 45'; Bradley 90'

== Fifth round ==
Tie no	Home team	Score	Away team
1	Liverpool	0 – 1	Watford
2	Preston North End	0 – 3	Everton
3	West Ham United	0 – 3	Newcastle United
4	Ipswich Town	1 – 3	Fulham
5	Blackburn Rovers	3 – 0	Manchester United
6	Chelsea	1 – 0	Portsmouth
7	Hull City	1 – 4	Crystal Palace
8	Aston Villa	4 – 1	Millwall

28 January 2010	Blackburn Rovers	3 – 0	Manchester United	Ewood Park, Blackburn
	Lowe 38' 88'; Hanley 69'			Attendance: 874

28 January 2010	Chelsea	1 – 0	Portsmouth	Stamford Bridge, London
	Clifford 10'			Attendance: 1,605

2 February 2010	Ipswich Town	1 – 3	Fulham	Portman Road, Ipswich
	Murray 58' (pen.)		Smith 68'; Pierre; Trotta 90' (pen.)	Attendance: 1,495

3 February 2010	West Ham United	0 – 3	Newcastle United	Upton Park, London
			Henderson 14'; Airey 49'; Inman 52'	Attendance: 1,157

4 February 2010	Preston North End	0 – 3	Everton	Deepdale, Preston
			Mustafi 30'; Duffy 70'; Barkley 76'	Attendance: 1,531

8 February 2010	Liverpool	0 – 1	Watford	Anfield, Liverpool
			Mingoia 17'	Attendance: 2,199

11 February 2010	Hull City	1 – 4	Crystal Palace	Grange Lane, North Ferriby
	Cullen 56'		Goldsmith 1' 57'; Kenlock 45'; Randall 89'	Attendance: 320

12 February 2010	Aston Villa	4 – 1	Millwall	Villa Park, Birmingham
	Simmonds 41'; Halfhuid 44', 45', 80'		Ofoche 70'	Attendance: 717

== Quarter-finals ==
Tie no	Home team	Score	Away team	Report
1	Watford	0 – 4	Chelsea	Report
2	Newcastle United	4 – 2	Crystal Palace	Report
3	Blackburn Rovers	2 – 1 (AET)	Everton	Report
4	Fulham	2 – 2 (P1–3)	Aston Villa	Report

16 February 2010	Watford	0 – 4	Chelsea	Vicarage Road, Watford
19:00 GMT		Report	Djaló 29'; Mitrović 45' (pen.); Bruma 60'; McEachran 85'	Attendance: 2,270

25 February 2010	Newcastle United	4 – 2	Crystal Palace	St. James' Park, Newcastle
19:00 GMT	Newton 24'; Adjei 27'; Airey 53'; Ameobi 78'	Report	Goldsmith 40' (pen.); Sekajja 80'	Attendance: 1,291

1 March 2010	Blackburn Rovers	2 – 1 (a.e.t.)	Everton	Ewood Park, Blackburn
19:00 GMT	Hanley 80'; Osawe 102'	Report	Duffy 42'	Attendance: 1,148

9 March 2010	Fulham	2 – 2 (a.e.t.) (1 – 3 p)	Aston Villa	Craven Cottage, London
19:00 GMT	Trotta 39' 113'	Report	Poyser 55'; Devine 120+2'	Attendance: 772
	Penalties
	Pritchard (penalty missed); Peniket (penalty missed); Frei (penalty scored); Marsh-Brown (penalty missed)		(penalty scored) Simmonds; (penalty scored) Poyser; (penalty missed) Carruthers; (penalty scored) Deeney

== Semi-finals ==
=== First leg ===
17 March 2010	Blackburn Rovers	0 – 1	Chelsea	Ewood Park, Blackburn
19:00 GMT	Michael Potts (red card) 55'	Report	Hitchcock 23' (o.g.); Djaló (red card) 55'; Sala (yellow card) 56'; Billy Clifford (yellow card)	Attendance: 1,332; Referee: Russell Booth

8 April 2010	Aston Villa	1 – 1	Newcastle United	Villa Park, Birmingham
19:00 BST	Kofi Poyser (yellow card) 30' (goal) 60'	Report	Airey 9'; Newton (yellow card) 36'	Attendance: 2,457; Referee: Mr R Shoebridge

=== Second leg ===
22 March 2010	Chelsea	4 – 0	Blackburn Rovers	Stamford Bridge, London
19:00 GMT	Mitrović 30'; Sala 34', 78'; Mills Pappoe (yellow card) 63'; Töre 70'	Report	Jackson Ramm (yellow card) 64'; Lowe (yellow card) 74'; Hitchcock (yellow card)	Attendance: 1,750; Referee: Linnington, (Newport, Isle of Wight)

Chelsea won 5–0 on aggregate.

16 April 2010	Newcastle United	0 – 1	Aston Villa	St. James' Park, Newcastle
19:00 BST	Dummett (yellow card) 43'; Airey (yellow card) 45' (yellow-red card) 76'	Report	Taylor 34'	Attendance: 4,959; Referee: G Sutton

Aston Villa won 2–1 on aggregate.

== Final ==
=== Route to the final ===
Chelsea		Round	Aston Villa	
Charlton Athletic; A 2–1	Jeffrey Bruma 27'; Marko Mitrović 80'	Third round	Rochdale; H 4–0	Gary Gardner 18', 31', 69'; Ryan Simmonds 59'
Nottingham Forest; A 4–0	Danny Mills Pappoe 8'; Marko Mitrović 74', 88'; Conor Clifford 83'	Fourth round	West Bromwich Albion; A 2–0	Gary Gardner 58'; Arsenio Halfhuid 70'
Portsmouth; H 1–0	Conor Clifford 10'	5th round	Millwall; H 4–1	Ryan Simmonds 41'; Arsenio Halfhuid 44', 45', 80'
Watford; A 4–0	Aliu Djaló 29'; Marko Mitrović 45' (pen.); Jeffrey Bruma 60'; Josh McEachran 85'	Sixth round	Fulham; A 2– 2 (a.e.t.); 3–1(pen.)	Kofi Poyser 55'; Daniel Devine 120+2' Ryan Simmonds Kofi Poyser Ellis Deeney
Blackburn Rovers; A 1–0	Tom Hitchcock 23' (o.g.)	Semi-finals; First leg	Newcastle United; H 1–1	Kofi Poyser 60'
Blackburn Rovers; H 4–0 (Agg 5–0)	Marko Mitrović 30'; Jacopo Sala 34', 78'; Gökhan Töre 70'	Second leg	Newcastle United; A 1–0 (Agg 2–1)	Connor Taylor 34'

=== First leg ===
29 April 2010
19:30 BST

Aston Villa	1 – 1	Chelsea
Devine 19'	Report	Bruma 64'

Villa Park, Birmingham
Attendance: 3,359
Referee: Kevin Friend

Aston Villa	Chelsea

Line-up:
GK	1	(Switzerland) Benjamin Siegrist
RB	2	(England) Durrell Berry
CB	3	(Republic of Ireland) Daniel Devine
CB	4	(Republic of Ireland) Derrick Williams
LB	5	(England) Ellis Deeney (c)
RM	6	(England) Ebby Nelson-Addy
CM	7	(Wales) Richard Blythe
LM	8	(Republic of Ireland) Samir Carruthers
FW	9	(England) Ryan Simmonds	(substituted off) 82'
FW	10	(Wales) Tomos Roberts
CF	11	(England) Kofi Poyser	(substituted off) 79'
Substitutes:
CB	12	(Netherlands) Arsenio Halfhuid	(substituted on) 82'
GK	13	(Scotland) Callum Barratt
CB	14	(England) James Clifton
CM	15	(Jamaica) Daniel Johnson
AM	16	(England) Darious Darkin	(substituted on) 79'
Manager:
(Scotland) Tony McAndrew

Line-up:
GK	1	(England) Sam Walker
RB	2	(England) Billy Clifford
CB	3	(Montserrat) Rohan Ince
CB	4	(Netherlands) Jeffrey Bruma
LB	5	(Sierra Leone) Aziz Deen-Conteh	(substituted off) 90'
CM	6	(Republic of Ireland) Conor Clifford (c)	(substituted off) 71'
RM	7	(Italy) Jacopo Sala
CM	8	(Guinea-Bissau) Aliu Djaló
LM	9	(Turkey) Gökhan Töre
AM	10	(England) Josh McEachran
CF	11	(Sweden) Marko Mitrović
Substitutes:
RM	12	(Slovakia) Milan Lalkovič	(substituted on) 71'
GK	13	(Albania) Aldi Haxhia
CM	14	(Northern Ireland) George Saville
LB	15	(England) Ben Sampayo
LB	16	(Republic of Ireland) Anton Rodgers	(substituted on) 90'
Manager:
(England) Dermot Drummy

=== Second leg ===
4 May 2010
19:45 BST

Chelsea	2 – 1	Aston Villa
Mitrović 64'; Clifford 83'	Report	Poyser 33'

Stamford Bridge, London
Attendance: 10,446
Referee: Kevin Friend

Chelsea	Aston Villa

Line-up:
GK	1	(England) Sam Walker
RB	2	(England) Billy Clifford
CB	3	(Montserrat) Rohan Ince
CB	4	(Netherlands) Jeffrey Bruma
LB	5	(Sierra Leone) Aziz Deen-Conteh
CM	6	(Republic of Ireland) Conor Clifford (c)
RM	7	(Italy) Jacopo Sala
CM	8	(Guinea-Bissau) Aliu Djaló	(substituted off) 90'
LM	9	(Turkey) Gökhan Töre	(substituted off) 88'
AM	10	(England) Josh McEachran
CF	11	(Sweden) Marko Mitrović
Substitutes:
RM	12	(Slovakia) Milan Lalkovič	(substituted on) 88'
GK	13	(Albania) Aldi Haxhia
CM	14	(Northern Ireland) George Saville	(substituted on) 90'
LB	15	(England) Ben Sampayo
LB	16	(Republic of Ireland) Anton Rodgers
Manager:
(England) Dermot Drummy

Line-up:
GK	1	(Switzerland) Benjamin Siegrist
RB	2	(England) Durrell Berry
CB	3	(Republic of Ireland) Daniel Devine
CB	4	(Republic of Ireland) Derrick Williams	(substituted off) 72'
LB	5	(England) Ellis Deeney (c)
RM	6	(England) Ebby Nelson-Addy
CM	7	(Wales) Richard Blythe	(substituted off) 89'
LM	8	(Republic of Ireland) Samir Carruthers
FW	9	(England) Ryan Simmonds
FW	10	(Wales) Tomos Roberts
CF	11	(England) Kofi Poyser
Substitutes:
CB	12	(Netherlands) Arsenio Halfhuid	(substituted on) 89'
GK	13	(Scotland) Callum Barratt
CM	14	(England) Jack Dyer
CM	15	(Jamaica) Daniel Johnson
AM	16	(England) Darious Darkin	(substituted on) 72'
Manager:
(Scotland) Tony McAndrew

Chelsea won 3 – 2 on aggregate

FA Youth Cup
2009–10 winners
Chelsea
3rd title

== See also ==
- 2009–10 Premier Academy League
- 2009–10 Premier Reserve League
- 2009–10 FA Cup
- 2009–10 in English football
