= 2010–11 Chelsea F.C. season =

English football club season

Chelsea F.C.
2010–11 season
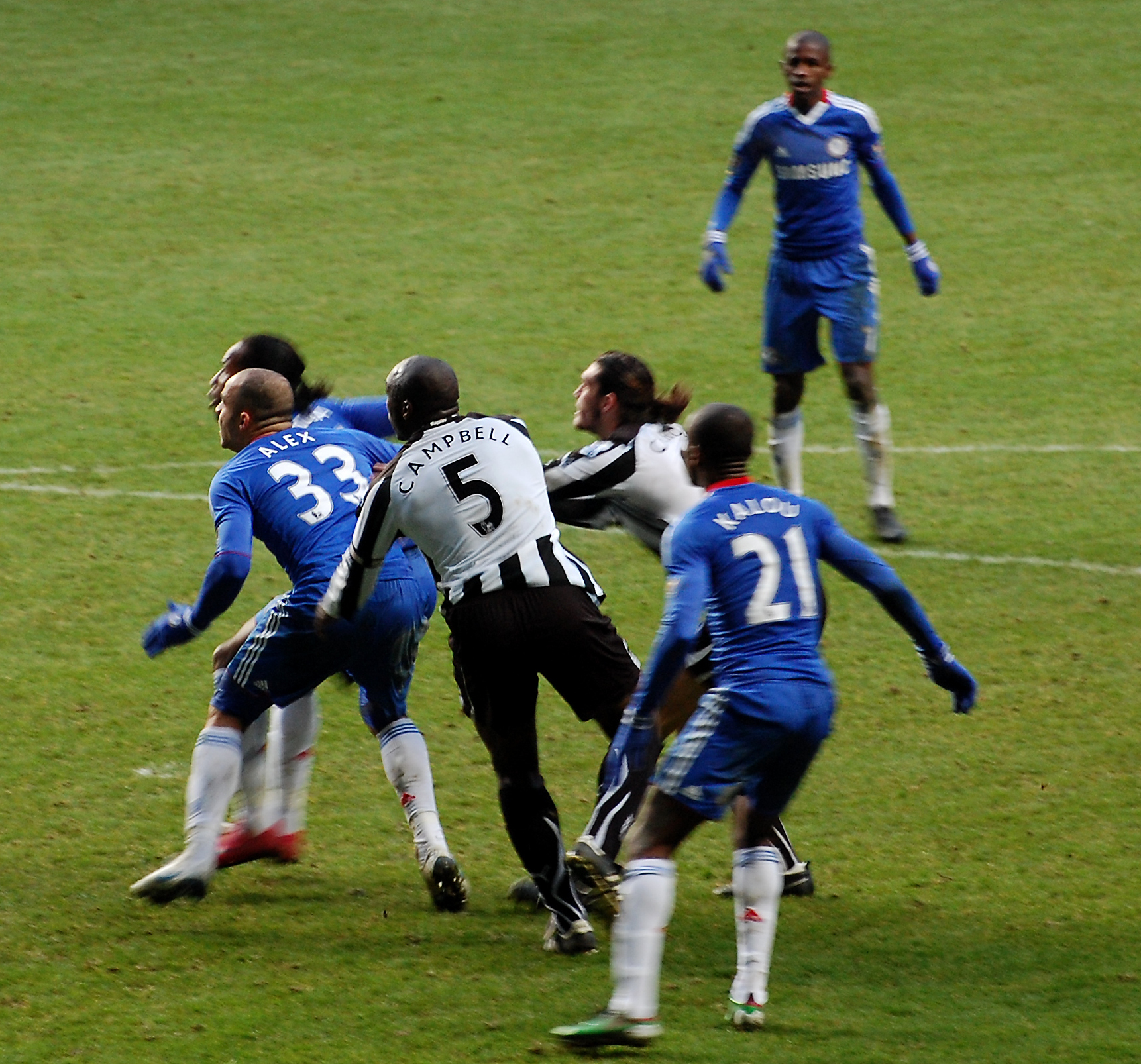
- Chelsea players away against Newcastle United at St James' Park
- Owner: Roman Abramovich
- Chairman: Bruce Buck
- Manager: Carlo Ancelotti
- Stadium: Stamford Bridge
- Premier League: 2nd
- FA Cup: Fourth round
- League Cup: Third round
- FA Community Shield: Runners-up
- UEFA Champions League: Quarter-finals
- Top goalscorer: League: Florent Malouda (13); All: Nicolas Anelka (16)
- Highest home attendance: 41,829 vs Liverpool (6 February 2011)
- Lowest home attendance: 40,266 vs Žilina (23 November 2010)
Home colours	Away colours	Third colours

The 2010–11 season was Chelsea Football Club's 97th competitive season, 19th consecutive season in the Premier League, and 105th year in existence as a football club. They went into the Premier League as the defending champions, but failed to retain it.

The club was managed by their Double-winning manager Carlo Ancelotti, but his association with the club would be broken off, being sacked at the end of the season. Chelsea started off the season with a strong five-consecutive-win run in the Premier League, which was eventually halted by Manchester City when City skipper Carlos Tevez scored to lead his side into a 1–0 triumph over the defending champions. Chelsea were leading the Premier League table for almost half a season, before Manchester United overtook them when Chelsea went through a bad period during the winter. Altogether in the Premier League, Chelsea won 21 games, drew 8 and lost 9. They conceded the fewest goals compared to all the other clubs in the league, sharing this with Manchester City.

In January 2011, on the last day of the transfer window, Chelsea bought Fernando Torres for a club-record-breaking and British-record-breaking fee of £50 million from Liverpool. They also bought defender David Luiz from Benfica, for €25 million plus Nemanja Matić, on the same day.

== Kits ==
Supplier: Adidas / Sponsor: Samsung

Home	Home alt.	2011–12	Away	Third	Third alt.

Goalkeeper 1	Goalkeeper 2	Goalkeeper 2 alt.	Goalkeeper 3

== Key dates ==
- 9 June 2010: Chelsea announce that they are to release Joe Cole, Michael Ballack and Juliano Belletti, whose contracts run out at the end of the month.
- 17 June 2010: Premier League fixtures for the 2010–11 season are announced. Chelsea are to open their defence of the Premier League crown at home to West Bromwich Albion, managed by former Blues midfielder Roberto Di Matteo.
- 2 July 2010: Chelsea make their first signing of the summer as Israel national team captain Yossi Benayoun joins from Liverpool for £5.5 million on a three-year deal.
- 7 July 2010: Chelsea sign 17-year-old Czech defender Tomáš Kalas from Sigma Olomouc in a deal worth £5.2 million, though he is immediately loaned back to Sigma Olomouc.
- 7 August 2010: Deco is allowed to leave Chelsea on compassionate grounds. He joins Brazilian club Fluminense for an undisclosed fee, linking up with former Chelsea teammate Juliano Belletti, who was released earlier in the summer.
- 8 August 2010: Chelsea are defeated 3–1 at Wembley by Manchester United in the 2010 FA Community Shield. United's Antonio Valencia opens the scoring in the first half, before Javier Hernández doubles their lead in the second. Salomon Kalou nets with seven minutes remaining, but Dimitar Berbatov's lob seals the game for United in added time.
- 9 August 2010: Scott Sinclair joins Championship side Swansea City for an initial fee of £500,000, which could rise to £1 million.
- 10 August 2010: After six years at Chelsea, Ricardo Carvalho joins Real Madrid for a fee of €8 million, where he is reunited with former Chelsea manager José Mourinho.
- 13 August 2010: Chelsea announce the signing of Ramires from Benfica for a fee of €22 million. The Brazilian signs a four-year deal.
- 14 August 2010: Chelsea begin the Premier League season with a resounding 6–0 win over newly promoted West Bromwich Albion. Didier Drogba scores a hat-trick, his second in consecutive matches at Stamford Bridge following his treble in the final weekend of the 2009–10 season. Florent Malouda bags a brace, while Frank Lampard scores one goal.
- 20 August 2010: 21-year-old defender Sam Hutchinson announces his retirement from professional football having suffered a recurrence of the knee injury which blighted his past three seasons. In total, he started one game for the first team and made three substitute appearances.
- 21 August 2010: Chelsea continue their goalscoring extravaganza as they defeat Wigan Athletic 0–6 at the DW Stadium. Florent Malouda opens the scoring a little after half an hour, while Nicolas Anelka and Salomon Kalou grab braces in the second half. Substitute Yossi Benayoun scores his first Chelsea goal in added time to complete the rout. Following Manchester United's draw with Fulham, Chelsea are the only team left with a 100% record in the Premier League.
- 26 August 2010: Chelsea draw Marseille, Spartak Moscow and Žilina in the group stages of the 2010–11 UEFA Champions League.
- 15 September 2010: Chelsea begin their Champions League campaign with a 1–4 away win against Žilina. Michael Essien opens the scoring after 13 minutes, and Nicolas Anelka's quick double puts them 3–0 up after half an hour. Daniel Sturridge scores his first Champions League goal for Chelsea in the second half, before Tomáš Oravec nabs a consolation.
- 22 September 2010: Chelsea suffer their first loss of the season as they crash out in the third round of the League Cup to Newcastle United, who defeat them 3–4 at Stamford Bridge. After Nicolas Anelka scores twice to bring the score from 1–3 to 3–3, Shola Ameobi scores an injury-time winner for the away side.
- 25 September 2010: Chelsea suffer a consecutive loss, their second in four days, as their 100% record in the League comes to an end with a 1–0 loss to Manchester City at Eastlands. Carlos Tevez scores the only goal of the game, on the hour.
- 3 October 2010: Chelsea defeat London rivals Arsenal 2–0 at Stamford Bridge in the first of the traditional "Big Four" clashes of the season. Didier Drogba's flick and Alex's crashing free kick send Chelsea four points clear at the top.
- 16 October 2010: Chelsea go without scoring for the second away league game in succession as they play out a 0–0 stalemate against Aston Villa. However, following Manchester United's earlier draw with West Brom, they maintain their five-point lead at the top of the league.
- 3 November 2010: A 4–1 win against Spartak Moscow ensures Chelsea's place in the knockout stages of the Champions League. With the score locked at 0–0 at the break, Nicolas Anelka opens the scoring in the second half from a tight angle, before Didier Drogba scores a penalty. Branislav Ivanović also scores his first Chelsea goals at Stamford Bridge either side of Nikita Bazhenov's consolation – the first goal conceded at Stamford Bridge for 956 minutes in all competitions.
- 7 November 2010: In the second of the former "Big Four" clashes of the season, Chelsea are defeated 2–0 by Liverpool at Anfield. Fernando Torres scores both goals.
- 11 November 2010: Chelsea part company with assistant manager Ray Wilkins. The former Blues player, who had enjoyed a previous stint at the club as assistant to Gianluca Vialli from 1999 to 2000, leaves again having rejoined for a second time in September 2008.
- 14 November 2010: Chelsea suffer a shock 0–3 defeat to Sunderland at Stamford Bridge, their second league loss in the space of a week. It is their heaviest home league defeat since Manchester United triumphed by a similar scoreline in 2002.
- 18 November 2010: Michael Emenalo is appointed as successor to Ray Wilkins in the role of assistant manager. Emenalo, who joined Chelsea in October 2007, is promoted from his position as head opposition scout.
- 20 November 2010: Chelsea fall to their third league defeat in four games as they lose 0–1 to Birmingham City at St Andrew's. Lee Bowyer scores the only goal of the game, while Ben Foster makes a string of excellent saves. Following Manchester United's win against Wigan, Chelsea now only lead the table on goal difference.
- 23 November 2010: A 2–1 win over Žilina ensures that Chelsea will be a top seed in the Champions League draw for the knock-out stages. Daniel Sturridge and Florent Malouda score the goals.
- 29 December 2010: Chelsea's last match of 2010 sees them end a horrid run of results without a win as they beat Bolton Wanderers 1–0 at Stamford Bridge, their first win in six league games.
- 2 January 2011: Chelsea begin 2011 with a thrilling 3–3 draw at home to Aston Villa. John Terry's 89th-minute goal looks to have sealed the game, only for Ciaran Clark to equalise in injury time.
- 5 January 2011: A 0–1 defeat to bottom club Wolverhampton Wanderers leaves Chelsea fifth in the league table.
- 9 January 2011: Chelsea begin their defence of the FA Cup with a resounding 7–0 win over Ipswich Town at Stamford Bridge.
- 24 January 2011: Chelsea triumph 0–4 against Bolton Wanderers at Reebok Stadium, their third consecutive win on the bounce as they look to put their poor run of form behind them.
- 31 January 2011: In a dramatic January transfer deadline day, Chelsea smash the British transfer record as they sign Fernando Torres from Liverpool for £50 million. Meanwhile, Chelsea also secure the signature of Benfica's David Luiz in a deal worth €25 million, with Nemanja Matić to move the other way in the summer.
- 6 February 2011: Chelsea lose 0–1 to Liverpool at Stamford Bridge, with Raul Meireles scoring the only goal in the 69th minute.
- 19 February 2011: Chelsea draw 1–1 after extra time to Everton in the FA Cup. Frank Lampard scored early in extra to give Chelsea the lead, but a free kick by Leighton Baines leveled the sides late. The sides went to penalties in which Chelsea were defeated 4–3, ending their two-year run as FA Cup holders.
- 1 March 2011: Chelsea triumph 2–1 against Manchester United to reignite their chances of defending the Premier League title. A strike from David Luiz cancels out Wayne Rooney's goal to level the match at 1–1, before a late Frank Lampard penalty seals the 2–1 win.
- 16 March 2011: Chelsea are held 0–0 by Copenhagen at Stamford Bridge, but progress to the Champions League quarter-finals with an aggregate score of 2–0.
- 20 March 2011: Chelsea defeat Manchester City 2–0 at Stamford Bridge. David Luiz first heads from Didier Drogba's free kick in the 78th minute. Ramires scores the second in the 90th minute, his second Premier League goal for Chelsea. Chelsea advance to third place in the league table, nine points behind Manchester United with a game in hand.
- 12 April 2011: Chelsea are knocked out of the UEFA Champions League quarter finals by rivals Manchester United. Chelsea lost the first leg at Stamford Bridge; Wayne Rooney scoring the only goal on 29 minutes. The second leg at Old Trafford ends 2–1 in Manchester United's favour. Javier Hernández scoring before half-time. Didier Drogba equalises with 15 minutes to go after coming off the bench but is almost instantly cancelled out by Park Ji-sung.
- 21 April 2011: Chelsea move into second in the Premier League table, on goal difference, with a 3–1 win over Birmingham City combined with Arsenal's 3–3 draw at Tottenham Hotspur.
- 24 April 2011: Fernando Torres scores his first goal for Chelsea against West Ham United in between a Frank Lampard strike and a Florent Malouda screamer, the latter provides the assist.
- 30 April 2011: Chelsea come from behind to beat Tottenham 2–1 at Stamford Bridge in controversial fashion. After Sandro gives Tottenham the lead with a shot from 30 yards, Chelsea equalise before half time when Heurelho Gomes lets Frank Lampard's long range effort through his body and over the line. Replays later appear to indicate that all of the ball had not crossed the line, but the goal is given. Then substitute Salomon Kalou, with minutes to go, stabs in Didier Drogba's fluffed shot from close range. Replays later show that Kalou was offside when the shot was taken, but again the goal is given. The result brought Chelsea only three points behind league leaders Manchester United, following their 0–1 defeat to Arsenal – with Man United the next side for Chelsea to play. A victory would take Chelsea top of the league with only two games left to play.
- 8 May 2011: Manchester United beat Chelsea 2–1 to inch closer to the record 19th title. Javier Hernández and Nemanja Vidić put United 2–0 up in the first half. Frank Lampard pulled one back in the second half, but it wasn't enough, as Manchester United kept their defense tight and held on to win the match.
- 22 May 2011: Carlo Ancelotti is sacked after the last match of the season.

== Club ==
=== Coaching staff ===
Position	Staff
Manager	(Italy) Carlo Ancelotti
Assistant managers	(England) Ray Wilkins (until 11 November 2011)
Assistant managers	(Italy) Bruno Demichelis
Assistant managers	(England) Paul Clement
Assistant managers	(Nigeria) Michael Emenalo (from 18 November 2010)
First team fitness coach	(England) Glen Driscoll
Assistant first team fitness coach	(England) Chris Jones
Individual team fitness coach	(Italy) Giovanni Mauri
Goalkeeping coach	(France) Christophe Lollichon
Head opposition scout	(Nigeria) Michael Emenalo (until 18 November 2010)
Senior opposition scout	(England) Mick McGiven
Medical director	(England) Dr. Bryan English
Sporting director	(Denmark) Frank Arnesen
Reserve team manager	(England) Steve Holland
Youth team manager	(England) Dermot Drummy
Academy manager	(England) Neil Bath
Match analyst	(England) James Melbourne

=== Other information ===
Owner	(Russia) Roman Abramovich
Chairman	(United States) Bruce Buck
Chief Executive	(England) Ron Gourlay
Director	(Ukraine) Eugene Tenenbaum
Ground (capacity and dimensions)	Stamford Bridge (41,841 / 103x67 metres)
Training ground	Cobham Training Centre

== Squads ==
=== First team squad ===
No.	Name	Nationality	Position (s)	Date of Birth (Age)	Signed from
Goalkeepers
1	Petr Čech	(Czech Republic)	GK	20 May 1982 (aged 29)	(France) Rennes
22	Ross Turnbull	(England)	GK	4 January 1985 (aged 26)	(England) Middlesbrough
40	Henrique Hilário	(Portugal)	GK	21 October 1975 (aged 35)	(Portugal) Nacional
Defenders
2	Branislav Ivanović	(Serbia)	RB / CB	22 February 1984 (aged 27)	(Russia) Lokomotiv Moscow
3	Ashley Cole	(England)	LB	20 December 1980 (aged 30)	(England) Arsenal
4	David Luiz	(Brazil)	CB	22 April 1987 (aged 24)	(Portugal) Benfica
17	José Bosingwa	(Portugal)	RB / LB	24 August 1982 (aged 28)	(Portugal) Porto
18	Yuri Zhirkov	(Russia)	LB / LM	20 August 1983 (aged 27)	(Russia) CSKA Moscow
19	Paulo Ferreira	(Portugal)	RB / LB	18 January 1979 (aged 32)	(Portugal) Porto
26	John Terry (C)	(England)	CB	7 December 1980 (aged 30)	(England) Chelsea Academy
33	Alex	(Brazil)	CB	17 June 1982 (aged 28)	(Brazil) Santos
Midfielders
5	Michael Essien	(Ghana)	CM / DM	3 December 1982 (aged 28)	(France) Lyon
7	Ramires	(Brazil)	CM / RM	24 March 1987 (aged 24)	(Portugal) Benfica
8	Frank Lampard (VC)	(England)	CM	20 June 1978 (aged 32)	(England) West Ham United
10	Yossi Benayoun	(Israel)	AM / LW / RW	5 May 1980 (aged 31)	(England) Liverpool
12	Mikel John Obi	(Nigeria)	DM	22 April 1987 (aged 24)	(Norway) Lyn Oslo
15	Florent Malouda	(France)	LW / CM	13 June 1980 (aged 30)	(France) Lyon
46	Josh McEachran	(England)	CM	1 March 1993 (aged 18)	(England) Chelsea Academy
Forwards
9	Fernando Torres	(Spain)	ST	20 March 1984 (aged 27)	(England) Liverpool
11	Didier Drogba	(Ivory Coast)	CF / ST	11 March 1978 (aged 33)	(France) Marseille
21	Salomon Kalou	(Ivory Coast)	RW / LW / ST	5 August 1985 (aged 25)	(Netherlands) Feyenoord
39	Nicolas Anelka	(France)	ST / RW	14 March 1979 (aged 32)	(England) Bolton Wanderers

=== Premier League squad ===
Note: Flags indicate national team as defined under FIFA eligibility rules; some limited exceptions apply. Players may hold more than one non-FIFA nationality.

No.	Pos.	Nation	Player
1	GK	CZE	Petr Čech
2	DF	SRB	Branislav Ivanović
3	DF	ENG	Ashley Cole ^{HG}
4	DF	BRA	David Luiz
5	MF	GHA	Michael Essien
7	MF	BRA	Ramires
8	MF	ENG	Frank Lampard ^{HG} (Vice-captain)
9	FW	ESP	Fernando Torres
10	MF	ISR	Yossi Benayoun
11	FW	CIV	Didier Drogba
12	MF	NGR	Mikel John Obi
15	MF	FRA	Florent Malouda
17	DF	POR	José Bosingwa
18	DF	RUS	Yuri Zhirkov

No.	Pos.	Nation	Player
19	DF	POR	Paulo Ferreira
21	FW	CIV	Salomon Kalou
22	GK	ENG	Ross Turnbull ^{HG}
23	FW	ENG	Daniel Sturridge ^{U21}
26	DF	ENG	John Terry ^{HG} (Captain)
33	DF	BRA	Alex
38	DF	NED	Patrick van Aanholt ^{U21}
39	FW	FRA	Nicolas Anelka
40	GK	POR	Henrique Hilário
43	DF	NED	Jeffrey Bruma ^{U21}
44	MF	FRA	Gaël Kakuta ^{U21}
45	FW	ITA	Fabio Borini ^{U21}
46	MF	ENG	Josh McEachran ^{U21}

- HG = Home-grown Player
- U21 = Under 21 Player

Source: 2010–11 Premier League squad

=== UEFA Champions League squad ===
Note: Flags indicate national team as defined under FIFA eligibility rules; some limited exceptions apply. Players may hold more than one non-FIFA nationality.

No.	Pos.	Nation	Player
1	GK	CZE	Petr Čech
2	DF	SRB	Branislav Ivanović
3	DF	ENG	Ashley Cole ^{HG^{1}}
5	MF	GHA	Michael Essien
7	MF	BRA	Ramires
8	MF	ENG	Frank Lampard ^{HG^{1}} (Vice-captain)
9	FW	ESP	Fernando Torres
10	MF	ISR	Yossi Benayoun
11	FW	CIV	Didier Drogba
12	MF	NGR	Mikel John Obi
15	MF	FRA	Florent Malouda
17	DF	POR	José Bosingwa
18	DF	RUS	Yuri Zhirkov

No.	Pos.	Nation	Player
19	DF	POR	Paulo Ferreira
21	FW	CIV	Salomon Kalou
22	GK	ENG	Ross Turnbull ^{HG^{1}}
26	DF	ENG	John Terry ^{HG^{2}} (Captain)
33	DF	BRA	Alex
38	DF	NED	Patrick van Aanholt ^{B}
39	FW	FRA	Nicolas Anelka
40	GK	POR	Henrique Hilário
43	DF	NED	Jeffrey Bruma ^{B}
44	MF	FRA	Gaël Kakuta ^{B}
46	MF	ENG	Josh McEachran ^{B}
52	MF	ENG	Jacob Mellis ^{B}

- B = List B Player
- HG^{1} = Association-trained player
- HG^{2} = Club-trained player

Source: 2010–11 UEFA Champions League squad

=== Reserve squad ===
Note: Flags indicate national team as defined under FIFA eligibility rules; some limited exceptions apply. Players may hold more than one non-FIFA nationality.

No.	Pos.	Nation	Player
54	GK	ENG	Sam Walker
61	GK	CZE	Jan Šebek
34	DF	ENG	Ryan Bertrand
49	DF	SLE	Aziz Deen-Conteh
51	DF	ENG	Rohan Ince
62	DF	SLE	Nathaniel Chalobah
—	DF	NIR	Carl Magnay
—	DF	GHA	Daniel Pappoe
47	MF	ENG	Billy Clifford

No.	Pos.	Nation	Player
50	MF	POR	Aliu Djaló
52	MF	ENG	Jacob Mellis
55	MF	ITA	Jacopo Sala
59	MF	ENG	Michael Woods
60	MF	ENG	Daniel Philliskirk
63	MF	TUR	Gökhan Töre
53	FW	SWE	Marko Mitrović
58	FW	ENG	Adam Phillip
64	FW	SVK	Milan Lalkovič

=== Academy squad ===
Note: Flags indicate national team as defined under FIFA eligibility rules; some limited exceptions apply. Players may hold more than one non-FIFA nationality.

No.	Pos.	Nation	Player
—	GK	ENG	Jamal Blackman
—	DF	ENG	Reece Loudon
—	DF	ENG	Todd Kane
—	DF	ENG	Archange Nkumu
—	DF	ENG	Ben Sampayo
50	MF	POR	Aliu Djaló
56	MF	ENG	George Saville

No.	Pos.	Nation	Player
—	MF	ENG	James Ashton
—	MF	SWE	Amin Affane
—	MF	POR	Buomesca Tué Na Bangna
—	MF	ENG	Danny Stenning
—	MF	IRL	Anton Rodgers
—	FW	ENG	Bobby Devyne
—	FW	AUT	Philipp Prosenik

== Transfers ==
=== In ===
==== Summer ====
No.	Pos	Player	Transferred From	Fee	Date	Source
10	MF	(Israel) Yossi Benayoun	(England) Liverpool	£5.5 million	2 July 2010	
—	DF	(Czech Republic) Tomáš Kalas	(Czech Republic) Sigma Olomouc	£5.2 million	7 July 2010	
7	MF	(Brazil) Ramires	(Portugal) Benfica	£18 million	13 August 2010	
—	GK	(Croatia) Matej Delač	(Croatia) Inter Zaprešić	£0.8 million	20 August 2010	

==== Winter ====
No.	Pos	Player	Transferred From	Fee	Date	Source
9	FW	(Spain) Fernando Torres	(England) Liverpool	£50 million	31 January 2011	
4	DF	(Brazil) David Luiz	(Portugal) Benfica	£21.3 million	31 January 2011	

=== Out ===
==== Summer ====
No.	Pos	Player	Transferred To	Fee	Date	Source
10	MF	(England) Joe Cole	(England) Liverpool	Free transfer	1 July 2010	
13	MF	(Germany) Michael Ballack	(Germany) Bayer Leverkusen	Free transfer	1 July 2010	
35	DF	(Brazil) Juliano Belletti	(Brazil) Fluminense	Free transfer	1 July 2010	
—	MF	(Slovakia) Miroslav Stoch	(Turkey) Fenerbahçe	€5.5 million	1 July 2010	
—	MF	(England) Billy Knott	(England) Sunderland	Free transfer	1 July 2010	
—	DF	(England) Nana Ofori-Twumasi	(England) Peterborough United	Free transfer	1 July 2010	
—	DF	(England) Kenny Strickland	(England) Marine	Free transfer	1 July 2010	
—	MF	(England) Liam Bridcutt	(England) Brighton & Hove Albion	Free transfer	1 July 2010	
47	DF	(Sri Lanka) Nikki Ahamed	(England) Wealdstone	Free transfer	1 July 2010	
—	GK	(Germany) Niclas Heimann	(Austria) Red Bull Salzburg	Free transfer	1 July 2010	
—	GK	(Albania) Aldi Haxhia	(England) Hayes & Yeading United	Free transfer	1 July 2010	
20	MF	(Portugal) Deco	(Brazil) Fluminense	Undisclosed	7 August 2010	
16	FW	(England) Scott Sinclair	(Wales) Swansea City	£0.5 million	9 August 2010	
6	DF	(Portugal) Ricardo Carvalho	(Spain) Real Madrid	€8 million	10 August 2010	
41	DF	(England) Sam Hutchinson	Retired due to injury	Released	20 August 2010	
9	FW	(Argentina) Franco Di Santo	(England) Wigan Athletic	£2 million	31 August 2010	

=== Loan out ===
No.	Pos	Player	Loaned To	Start	End	Source
30	GK	(Wales) Rhys Taylor	(England) Crewe Alexandra	6 July 2010	31 May 2011	
—	DF	(Czech Republic) Tomáš Kalas	(Czech Republic) Sigma Olomouc	7 July 2010	31 December 2010	
60	MF	(England) Daniel Philliskirk	(England) Oxford United	2 August 2010	29 August 2010	
34	DF	(England) Ryan Bertrand	(England) Nottingham Forest	5 August 2010	3 January 2011	
—	DF	(England) Ben Gordon	(Scotland) Kilmarnock	5 August 2010	3 January 2011	
—	MF	(England) Jack Cork	(England) Burnley	12 August 2010	31 May 2011	
24	MF	(Serbia) Nemanja Matić	(Netherlands) Vitesse Arnhem	24 August 2010	30 June 2011	
—	DF	(Serbia) Slobodan Rajković	(Netherlands) Vitesse Arnhem	24 August 2010	30 June 2011	
42	DF	(England) Michael Mancienne	(England) Wolverhampton Wanderers	26 August 2010	31 May 2011	
—	GK	(Croatia) Matej Delač	(Netherlands) Vitesse Arnhem	31 August 2010	30 June 2011	
—	MF	(Republic of Ireland) Conor Clifford	(England) Plymouth Argyle	22 October 2010	22 December 2010	
58	FW	(England) Adam Phillip	(England) Yeovil Town	15 November 2010	15 December 2010	
59	MF	(England) Michael Woods	(England) Notts County	25 November 2010	9 January 2011	
—	DF	(England) Ben Gordon	(England) Scunthorpe United	6 January 2011	31 May 2011	
60	MF	(England) Daniel Philliskirk	(England) Sheffield United	10 January 2011	31 May 2011	
38	DF	(Netherlands) Patrick van Aanholt	(England) Leicester City	26 January 2011	31 May 2011	
44	MF	(France) Gaël Kakuta	(England) Fulham	26 January 2011	31 May 2011	
52	MF	(England) Jacob Mellis	(England) Barnsley	31 January 2011	8 May 2011	
23	FW	(England) Daniel Sturridge	(England) Bolton Wanderers	31 January 2011	31 May 2011	
43	DF	(Netherlands) Jeffrey Bruma	(England) Leicester City	11 February 2011	31 May 2011	
—	MF	(Republic of Ireland) Conor Clifford	(England) Notts County	11 February 2011	7 April 2011	
45	FW	(Italy) Fabio Borini	(Wales) Swansea City	17 March 2011	30 May 2011	
54	GK	(England) Sam Walker	(England) Barnet	24 March 2011	7 May 2011	

=== Overall transfer activity ===
==== Spending ====
Summer: ▼£29.8 million

Winter: ▼£71.5 million

Total: ▼£101.3 million

==== Income ====
Summer: ▲£13.7 million

Winter: £0

Total: ▲£13.7 million

==== Expenditure ====
Summer: ▼£16.1 million

Winter: ▼£71.5 million

Total: ▼£87.6 million

== Competitions ==
Competition	Started round	Final position / round	First match	Last match
FA Community Shield	Final	Runners-up	8 Aug 2010	
Premier League	—	2nd	14 Aug 2010	22 May 2011
UEFA Champions League	Group stage	Quarter-finals	15 Sept 2010	12 April 2011
Football League Cup	3rd round	3rd round	22 Sept 2010	
FA Cup	3rd round	4th round	9 Jan 2011	19 Feb 2011

=== Pre-season ===
17 July 2010	Crystal Palace (England)	0–1	(England) Chelsea	Selhurst Park, London
15:00 BST		(Report)	Essien 58'	Attendance: 21,345; Referee: Iain Williamson

23 July 2010	Ajax (Netherlands)	3–1	(England) Chelsea	Amsterdam Arena, Amsterdam
17:00 BST	Bruma 6' (o.g.); De Jong 26'; Suk 90'	(Report)	Sturridge 25'	Attendance: 21,000; Referee: Bas Nijhuis

1 August 2010	Eintracht Frankfurt (Germany)	2–1	(England) Chelsea	Commerzbank-Arena, Frankfurt am Main
15:00 BST	Ochs 24'; Altıntop 82' (pen.)	(Report)	Malouda (yellow card) 36'; Lampard 63'	Attendance: 45,000; Referee: Felix Brych

4 August 2010	Hamburger SV (Germany)	2–1	(England) Chelsea	Imtech Arena, Hamburg
20:00 BST	Petrić 71'; Son 86'	(Report)	Lampard 23'; Terry (yellow card) 41'	Attendance: 47,440; Referee: Florian Meyer

=== FA Community Shield ===
8 August 2010	Chelsea	1–3	Manchester United	Wembley Stadium, London
15:00 BST	Kalou 83'	(Report)	Valencia 41'; Hernández 76'; Berbatov 90+2'	Attendance: 84,623; Referee: Andre Marriner

=== Premier League ===
==== League table ====
Pos	Team	Pld	W	D	L	GF	GA	GD	Pts	Qualification or relegation
1	Manchester United (C)	38	23	11	4	78	37	+41	80	Qualification for the Champions League group stage
2	Chelsea	38	21	8	9	69	33	+36	71	Qualification for the Champions League group stage
3	Manchester City	38	21	8	9	60	33	+27	71	Qualification for the Champions League group stage
4	Arsenal	38	19	11	8	72	43	+29	68	Qualification for the Champions League play-off round
5	Tottenham Hotspur	38	16	14	8	55	46	+9	62	Qualification for the Europa League play-off round

Source: Barclays Premier League
Rules for classification: 1) points; 2) goal difference; 3) number of goals scored.
(C) Champions

==== Results summary ====
Overall								Home						Away					
Pld	W	D	L	GF	GA	GD	Pts	W	D	L	GF	GA	GD	W	D	L	GF	GA	GD
38	21	8	9	69	33	+36	71	14	3	2	39	13	+26	7	5	7	30	20	+10

==== Results by round ====
Round	1	2	3	4	5	6	7	8	9	10	11	12	13	14	15	16	17	18	19	20	21	22	23	24	25	26	27	28	29	30	31	32	33	34	35	36	37	38
Ground	H	A	H	A	H	A	H	A	H	A	A	H	H	A	A	H	A	A	H	H	A	H	A	A	H	A	H	A	H	A	H	A	H	H	H	A	H	A
Result	W	W	W	W	W	L	W	D	W	W	L	W	L	L	D	D	D	L	W	D	L	W	W	W	L	D	W	W	W	D	W	W	W	W	W	L	D	L
Position	1	1	1	1	1	1	1	1	1	1	1	1	1	1	2	3	4	4	4	5	5	4	4	4	4	5	4	4	3	3	3	3	2	2	2	2	2	2
Points	3	6	9	12	15	15	18	19	22	25	25	28	28	28	29	30	31	31	34	35	35	38	41	44	44	45	48	51	54	55	58	61	64	67	70	70	71	71

A = Away; H = Home; W = Win; D = Draw; L = Loss

==== Matches ====
14 August 2010 1	Chelsea	6–0	West Bromwich Albion	Stamford Bridge, London
15:00 BST	Malouda 6', 90'; Drogba 45+1', 55', 68'; Ferreira (yellow card) 56'; Lampard 63'	(Report)		Attendance: 41,589; Referee: Mark Clattenburg

21 August 2010 2	Wigan Athletic	0–6	Chelsea	DW Stadium, Wigan
17:15 BST	Diamé (yellow card) 60'	(Report)	Malouda 34'; Ivanović (yellow card) 37'; Anelka 48', 52'; Terry (yellow card) 61'; Kalou 78', 90'; Benayoun 90+4'	Attendance: 14,476; Referee: Mike Dean

28 August 2010 3	Chelsea	2–0	Stoke City	Stamford Bridge, London
15:00 BST	Malouda 31'; Drogba 77' (pen.)	(Report)	Whitehead (yellow card) 37'; Etherington (yellow card) 45+2'	Attendance: 40,931; Referee: Martin Atkinson

11 September 2010 4	West Ham United	1–3	Chelsea	Upton Park, London
15:00 BST	Parker (yellow card) 43', (goal) 85'; Noble (yellow card) 90'	(Report)	Essien 2', 83'; Kalou 18'; Cole (yellow card) 40'; Ivanović (yellow card) 64'	Attendance: 33,014; Referee: Chris Foy

19 September 2010 5	Chelsea	4–0	Blackpool	Stamford Bridge, London
16:00 BST	Kalou 2'; Malouda 12', 41'; Evatt 30' (o.g.); Drogba (yellow card) 37'	(Report)	Eardley (yellow card) 38'; Vaughan (yellow card) 54'	Attendance: 41,761; Referee: Mark Clattenburg

25 September 2010 6	Manchester City	1–0	Chelsea	City of Manchester Stadium, Manchester
12:45 BST	Zabaleta (yellow card) 35'; Tevez 59'; Boyata (yellow card) 77'	(Report)	Mikel (yellow card) 65'; Ramires (yellow card) 80'; Alex (yellow card) 90+2'	Attendance: 47,203; Referee: Andre Marriner

3 October 2010 7	Chelsea	2–0	Arsenal	Stamford Bridge, London
16:00 BST	Drogba 39'; Ferreira (yellow card) 80'; Alex 85'	(Report)	Koscielny (yellow card) 84'	Attendance: 41,828; Referee: Mike Dean

16 October 2010 8	Aston Villa	0–0	Chelsea	Villa Park, Birmingham
17:30 BST	Warnock (yellow card) 65'; Ireland (yellow card) 69'; Clark (yellow card) 75'; Young (yellow card) 80'	(Report)	Essien (yellow card) 13'; Terry (yellow card) 60'; McEachran (yellow card) 84'	Attendance: 40,122; Referee: Lee Mason

23 October 2010 9	Chelsea	2–0	Wolverhampton Wanderers	Stamford Bridge, London
15:00 BST	Malouda 23'; Mikel (yellow card) 73'; Kalou 81'	(Report)	Stearman (yellow card) 33'; Berra (yellow card) 89'	Attendance: 41,752; Referee: Lee Probert

30 October 2010 10	Blackburn Rovers	1–2	Chelsea	Ewood Park, Blackburn
15:00 GMT	Benjani 21'; Salgado (yellow card) 33'; Nelsen (yellow card) 81'	(Report)	Anelka 39'; Drogba (yellow card) 66'; Ivanović (yellow card) 80', (goal) 84'	Attendance: 25,836; Referee: Peter Walton

7 November 2010 11	Liverpool	2–0	Chelsea	Anfield, Liverpool
16:00 GMT	Torres 11', 44'	(Report)	Zhirkov (yellow card) 20'; Alex (yellow card) 90'	Attendance: 44,238; Referee: Howard Webb

10 November 2010 12	Chelsea	1–0	Fulham	Stamford Bridge, London
19:45 GMT	Essien 30', (yellow card) 50' (red card) 90+4'; Cole (yellow card) 76'	(Report)		Attendance: 41,593; Referee: Martin Atkinson

14 November 2010 13	Chelsea	0–3	Sunderland	Stamford Bridge, London
16:10 GMT	Ivanović (yellow card) 40'	(Report)	Turner (yellow card) 29'; Onuoha 45'; Gyan 52'; Welbeck 87'	Attendance: 41,072; Referee: Chris Foy

20 November 2010 14	Birmingham City	1–0	Chelsea	St Andrew's, Birmingham
15:00 GMT	Bowyer 17'; Ridgewell (yellow card) 78'; Fahey (yellow card) 85'	(Report)		Attendance: 24,357; Referee: Mark Halsey

28 November 2010 15	Newcastle United	1–1	Chelsea	St. James' Park, Newcastle upon Tyne
13:30 GMT	Carroll 5'; Tioté (yellow card) 85'; Guthrie (yellow card) 90'	(Report)	Ramires (yellow card) 21'; Kalou 45'	Attendance: 46,469; Referee: Andre Marriner

4 December 2010 16	Chelsea	1–1	Everton	Stamford Bridge, London
15:00 GMT	Drogba 42' (pen.); Terry (yellow card) 76'	(Report)	Neville (yellow card) 29'; Howard (yellow card) 41'; Coleman (yellow card) 77'; Beckford 86'; Jagielka (yellow card) 90+2'	Attendance: 41,642; Referee: Lee Probert

12 December 2010 17	Tottenham Hotspur	1–1	Chelsea	White Hart Lane, London
16:00 GMT	Pavlyuchenko 15'; Assou-Ekotto (yellow card) 35'; Gomes (yellow card) 90+1'	(Report)	Drogba 70', (yellow card) 90+4'; Essien (yellow card) 73'	Attendance: 35,787; Referee: Mike Dean

27 December 2010 18	Arsenal	3–1	Chelsea	Emirates Stadium, London
20:00 GMT	Van Persie (yellow card) 33'; Song 44'; Fàbregas 51', (yellow card) 68'; Walcott 53'	(Report)	Cole (yellow card) 29'; Kalou (yellow card) 39'; Ivanović 57'; Lampard (yellow card) 59'	Attendance: 60,112; Referee: Mark Clattenburg

29 December 2010 19	Chelsea	1–0	Bolton Wanderers	Stamford Bridge, London
20:00 GMT	Ivanović (yellow card) 26'; Malouda 61'	(Report)	Taylor (yellow card) 43'	Attendance: 40,982; Referee: Mike Jones

2 January 2011 20	Chelsea	3–3	Aston Villa	Stamford Bridge, London
14:00 GMT	Lampard 23' (pen.); Ramires (yellow card) 39'; Drogba 84'; Terry (yellow card) 75' (goal) 89'	(Report)	Petrov (yellow card) 20'; Collins (yellow card) 22'; Friedel (yellow card) 22'; Reo-Coker (yellow card) 28'; A. Young 41' (pen.); Agbonlahor (yellow card) 42'; Heskey 47', (yellow card) 49'; Clark (yellow card) 45', (goal) 90+1'	Attendance: 41,222; Referee: Lee Mason

5 January 2011 21	Wolverhampton Wanderers	1–0	Chelsea	Molineux Stadium, Wolverhampton
19:45 GMT	Bosingwa 5' (o.g.)	(Report)	Ivanović (yellow card) 45+1'	Attendance: 26,432; Referee: Mark Halsey

15 January 2011 22	Chelsea	2–0	Blackburn Rovers	Stamford Bridge, London
15:00 GMT	Malouda (yellow card) 50'; Ivanović 57'; Anelka 76'	(Report)		Attendance: 40,846; Referee: Martin Atkinson

24 January 2011 23	Bolton Wanderers	0–4	Chelsea	Reebok Stadium, Bolton
20:00 GMT		(Report)	Drogba 11'; Malouda 41'; Anelka 56'; Ramires 74'	Attendance: 22,837; Referee: Chris Foy

1 February 2011 24	Sunderland	2–4	Chelsea	Stadium of Light, Sunderland
19:45 GMT	Bardsley 4'; Richardson 26', (yellow card) 83'	(Report)	Lampard 15' (pen.); Kalou 23'; Drogba (yellow card) 54'; Terry 60'; Ivanović (yellow card) 83'; Anelka 90+3'	Attendance: 37,855; Referee: Mark Halsey

6 February 2011 25	Chelsea	0–1	Liverpool	Stamford Bridge, London
16:00 GMT	Mikel (yellow card) 1'	(Report)	Meireles 69'; Lucas (yellow card) 74'	Attendance: 41,829; Referee: Andre Marriner

14 February 2011 26	Fulham	0–0	Chelsea	Craven Cottage, London
20:00 GMT	Sidwell (yellow card) 43'; Gera (yellow card) 90+1'	(Report)	Ivanović (yellow card) 38'	Attendance: 25,685; Referee: Mike Dean

1 March 2011 27	Chelsea	2–1	Manchester United	Stamford Bridge, London
19:45 GMT	David Luiz 54'; Lampard 80' (pen.)	(Report)	Rooney 29'	Attendance: 41,825; Referee: Martin Atkinson

7 March 2011 28	Blackpool	1–3	Chelsea	Bloomfield Road, Blackpool
20:00 GMT	Puncheon 86'	(Report)	Terry 20'; Lampard 63' (pen.), 66'	Attendance: 15,584; Referee: Mike Dean

20 March 2011 29	Chelsea	2–0	Manchester City	Stamford Bridge, London
16:00 GMT	Ramires (yellow card) 68', (goal) 90+2'; David Luiz 79', (yellow card) 90+3'	(Report)	Milner (yellow card) 25'; De Jong (yellow card) 58'; Džeko (yellow card) 70'; Barry (yellow card) 82'; Kolarov (yellow card) 90'	Attendance: 41,741; Referee: Chris Foy

2 April 2011 30	Stoke City	1–1	Chelsea	Britannia Stadium, Stoke-on-Trent
15:00 GMT	Walters 8', (yellow card) 55'	(Report)	Drogba 33'; Bosingwa (yellow card) 58'; Cole (yellow card) 64'	Attendance: 27,508; Referee: Peter Walton

9 April 2011 31	Chelsea	1–0	Wigan Athletic	Stamford Bridge, London
15:00 GMT	David Luiz (yellow card) 55'; Malouda 67'	(Report)	Boyce (yellow card) 42'; Figueroa (yellow card) 90+2'	Attendance: 40,734; Referee: Howard Webb

16 April 2011 32	West Bromwich Albion	1–3	Chelsea	The Hawthorns, West Bromwich
15:00 GMT	Odemwingie 17'; Méïté (yellow card) 34'	(Report)	Drogba 22'; Kalou 26'; Lampard 45'	Attendance: 25,163; Referee: Lee Probert

20 April 2011 33	Chelsea	3–1	Birmingham City	Stamford Bridge, London
19:45 GMT	Malouda 3', 62'; Kalou 26'	(Report)	Parnaby (yellow card) 50'; Larsson 77' (pen.)	Attendance: 40,848; Referee: Mike Jones

23 April 2011 34	Chelsea	3–0	West Ham United	Stamford Bridge, London
17:30 GMT	Ivanović (yellow card) 29'; Lampard 44'; Torres 84'; Malouda 90+3'	(Report)	Hitzlsperger (yellow card) 7'; Ba (yellow card) 81'	Attendance: 41,656; Referee: Phil Dowd

30 April 2011 35	Chelsea	2–1	Tottenham Hotspur	Stamford Bridge, London
17:30 GMT	Ivanović (yellow card) 38'; Lampard 45+1'; Drogba (yellow card) 49'; Kalou 89'	(Report)	Sandro 19'; Pavlyuchenko (yellow card) 57'	Attendance: 41,681; Referee: Andre Marriner

8 May 2011 36	Manchester United	2–1	Chelsea	Old Trafford, Manchester
16:10 GMT	Hernández 1'; Vidić 23'; Rooney (yellow card) 39'; Giggs (yellow card) 83'	(Report)	Ivanović (yellow card) 12'; Essien (yellow card) 43'; Lampard 69'; Ramires (yellow card) 86'; Drogba (yellow card) 90'	Attendance: 75,445; Referee: Howard Webb

15 May 2011 37	Chelsea	2–2	Newcastle United	Stamford Bridge, London
13:30 GMT	Ivanović 2', (yellow card) 60'; Terry (yellow card) 9'; Ramires (yellow card) 45+1'; Lampard (yellow card) 57'; Alex 83'	(Report)	Gutiérrez 10'; Simpson (yellow card) 73'; José Enrique (yellow card) 82'; S. Taylor 90+2', (yellow card) 90+2'	Attendance: 41,739; Referee: Lee Mason

22 May 2011 38	Everton	1–0	Chelsea	Goodison Park, Liverpool
16:00 GMT	Heitinga (yellow card) 26'; Coleman (yellow card) 46' (yellow-red card) 53'; Baines (yellow card) 50'; Beckford 74'	(Report)	Alex (yellow card) 51'; Torres (yellow card) 90+3'	Attendance: 38,712; Referee: Peter Walton

=== UEFA Champions League ===
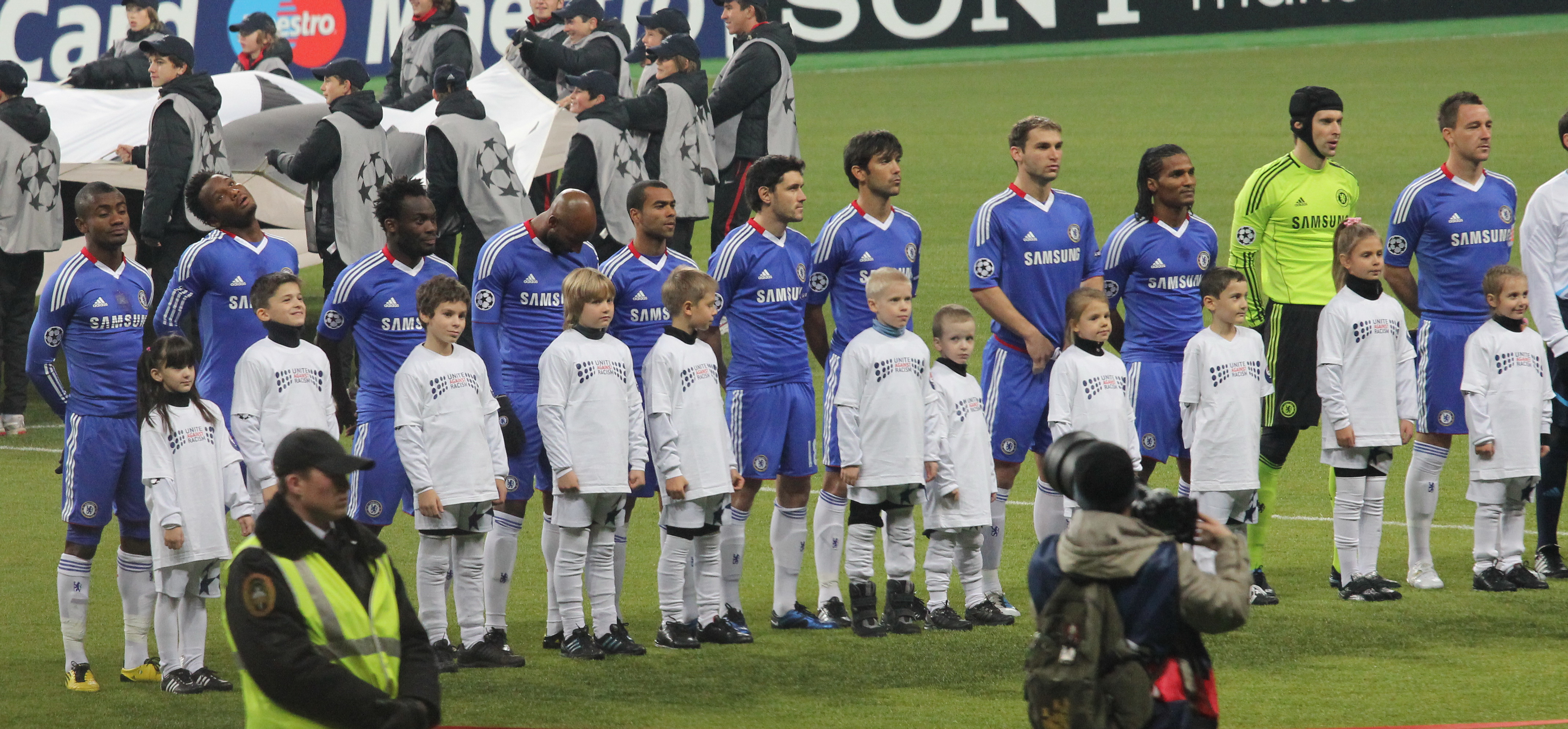
Chelsea's starting XI v Spartak Moscow at Luzhniki Stadium in Moscow on 19 October 2010

==== Group stage ====
The draw for the group stage was held on 26 August 2010 in Monaco. Chelsea was paired with 2009–10 French Ligue 1 champions Marseille, as well as Russian Premier League's, Spartak Moscow and Žilina of the Slovakian Corgoň Liga.

Pos	Team	Pld	W	D	L	GF	GA	GD	Pts	Qualification
1	(England) Chelsea	6	5	0	1	14	4	+10	15	Advance to knockout phase
2	(France) Marseille	6	4	0	2	12	3	+9	12	Advance to knockout phase
3	(Russia) Spartak Moscow	6	3	0	3	7	10	−3	9	Transfer to Europa League
4	(Slovakia) Žilina	6	0	0	6	3	19	−16	0	

Source: Soccerway

15 September 2010 1	Žilina (Slovakia)	1–4	(England) Chelsea	Žilina, Slovakia
19:45 BST	Oravec 55'	(Report)	Essien 13'; Anelka 24', 28'; Sturridge 48'	Stadium: Stadium Pod Dubňom; Attendance: 11,181; Referee: Björn Kuipers (Netherlands)

28 September 2010 2	Chelsea (England)	2–0	(France) Marseille	London, England
19:45 BST	Terry 7'; Anelka 28' (pen.); Mikel (yellow card) 82'	(Report)	Mbia (yellow card) 27'; Heinze (yellow card) 28'	Stadium: Stamford Bridge; Attendance: 40,675; Referee: Frank De Bleeckere (Belgium)

19 October 2010 3	Spartak Moscow (Russia)	0–2	(England) Chelsea	Moscow, Russia
17:30 BST	Suchý (yellow card) 56'	(Report)	Zhirkov 24', (yellow card) 88'; Anelka 43'	Stadium: Luzhniki Stadium; Attendance: 75,000; Referee: Carlos Velasco Carballo (Spain)

3 November 2010 4	Chelsea (England)	4–1	(Russia) Spartak Moscow	London, England
19:45 BST	Mikel (yellow card) 38'; Anelka 49'; Drogba 62' (pen.); Ivanović 66', 90+2'	(Report)	Kombarov (yellow card) 43'; Ivanov (yellow card) 66'; Bazhenov 86'	Stadium: Stamford Bridge; Attendance: 40,477; Referee: Cüneyt Çakır (Turkey)

23 November 2010 5	Chelsea (England)	2–1	(Slovakia) Žilina	London, England
19:45 GMT	Sturridge 51'; Ramires (yellow card) 80'; Malouda 86'	(Report)	Bello 19'	Stadium: Stamford Bridge; Attendance: 40,266; Referee: Robert Schörgenhofer (Austria)

8 December 2010 6	Marseille (France)	1–0	(England) Chelsea	Marseille, France
19:45 GMT	Brandão 81'; A. Ayew (yellow card) 82'	(Report)		Stadium: Stade Vélodrome; Attendance: 50,604; Referee: Vladislav Bezborodov (Russia)

==== Knockout phase ====
===== Round of 16 =====
22 February 2011 First leg	Copenhagen (Denmark)	0–2	(England) Chelsea	Copenhagen, Denmark
19:45 GMT	Zanka (yellow card) 7'; Pospěch (yellow card) 70'	(Report)	Anelka 17', 54'; Torres (yellow card) 35'; Malouda (yellow card) 84'; Terry (yellow card) 86'	Stadium: Parken Stadium; Attendance: 28,000; Referee: Björn Kuipers (Netherlands)

16 March 2011 Second leg	Chelsea (England)	0–0 (2–0 agg.)	(Denmark) Copenhagen	London, England
19:45 GMT	Drogba (yellow card) 54'	(Report)	Claudemir (yellow card) 69'; Bolaños (yellow card) 83'	Stadium: Stamford Bridge; Attendance: 36,454; Referee: Svein Oddvar Moen (Norway)

===== Quarter-finals =====
6 April 2011 First leg	Chelsea (England)	0–1	(England) Manchester United	London, England
19:45 GMT	Zhirkov (yellow card) 36'; Ramires (yellow card) 60'; Essien (yellow card) 66'; Torres (yellow card) 90+3'	(Report)	Rooney 24'; Vidić (yellow card) 74'; Van der Sar (yellow card) 80'	Stadium: Stamford Bridge; Attendance: 37,915; Referee: Alberto Undiano Mallenco (Spain)

12 April 2011 Second leg	Manchester United (England)	2–1 (3–1 agg.)	(England) Chelsea	Manchester, England
19:45 GMT	O'Shea (yellow card) 19'; Hernández 43'; Evra (yellow card) 59'; Park 77'	(Report)	Malouda (yellow card) 37'; Terry (yellow card) 41'; Ramires (yellow card) 33' (yellow-red card) 70'; Drogba 76'	Stadium: Old Trafford; Attendance: 74,672; Referee: Olegário Benquerença (Portugal)

=== League Cup ===
22 September 2010 Third round	Chelsea	3–4	Newcastle United	London
19:45 BST	Van Aanholt 6'; Bruma (yellow card) 32'; Anelka 70', 87' (pen.)	(Report)	Ranger 27'; R. Taylor (yellow card) 11' (goal) 32'; Ameobi (yellow card) 43', (goal) 49', 90'; Tioté (yellow card) 86'	Stadium: Stamford Bridge; Attendance: 41,511; Referee: Phil Dowd

=== FA Cup ===
9 January 2011 Third round	Chelsea	7–0	Ipswich Town	London
15:00 GMT	Kalou 33'; Sturridge 33', 52'; Edwards 41' (o.g.); Anelka 49'; Lampard 78', 79'	(Report)	Norris (yellow card) 41'	Stadium: Stamford Bridge; Attendance: 41,654; Referee: Andy D'Urso

29 January 2011 Fourth round	Everton	1–1	Chelsea	Liverpool
12:30 GMT	Saha 62'	(Report)	Kalou 75'	Stadium: Goodison Park; Attendance: 28,376; Referee: Howard Webb

19 February 2011 Replay	Chelsea	1–1 (a.e.t.) (3–4 p)	Everton	London
12:30 GMT	Malouda (yellow card) 43'; Ramires (yellow card) 45+1'; Lampard 104'	(Report)	Baines (yellow card) 51', (goal) 119'; Coleman (yellow card) 53'; Distin (yellow card) 60'	Stadium: Stamford Bridge; Attendance: 41,113; Referee: Phil Dowd
	Penalties
	Lampard (penalty scored); Drogba (penalty scored); Anelka (penalty missed); Essien (penalty scored); Cole (penalty missed)		(penalty missed) Baines; (penalty scored) Jagielka; (penalty scored) Arteta; (penalty scored) Heitinga; (penalty scored) Neville

== Statistics ==
=== Appearances ===
As of end of season

Rnk	Pos	No.	Player	Premier League	FA Cup	League Cup	Community Shield	Champions League	Total
1	GK	1	(Czech Republic) Petr Čech	38	3	0	0	9	50
1	MF	15	(France) Florent Malouda	33+5	2	0	1	7+2	50
3	DF	3	(England) Ashley Cole	38	2	0	1	7	48
3	DF	2	(Serbia) Branislav Ivanović	32+2	3	0	1	10	48
5	FW	11	(Ivory Coast) Didier Drogba	30+6	2	0	0+1	5+2	46
5	DF	26	(England) John Terry	33	3	1	1	8	46
5	FW	39	(France) Nicolas Anelka	27+5	2+1	1	1	7+2	46
8	MF	5	(Ghana) Michael Essien	32+1	1+1	0	1	7+1	44
9	FW	21	(Ivory Coast) Salomon Kalou	16+15	2+1	0+1	1	3+3	42
10	MF	7	(Brazil) Ramires	22+7	3	1	—	7+1	41
11	MF	12	(Nigeria) Mikel John Obi	28	1+1	0	1	5+1	37
12	MF	8	(England) Frank Lampard	23+1	3	0	1	4	32
13	DF	19	(Portugal) Paulo Ferreira	12+9	1	1	0+1	4+1	29
14	DF	17	(Portugal) José Bosingwa	13+7	2	0	0	4	26
15	DF	18	(Russia) Yuri Zhirkov	6+6	0+1	1	0+1	6+1	22
16	FW	23	(England) Daniel Sturridge	0+13	1	1	0+1	2+3	21
17	DF	33	(Brazil) Alex	12+3	0	0+1	0	4	20
18	FW	9	(Spain) Fernando Torres	8+6	—			3+1	18
19	MF	46	(England) Josh McEachran	1+8	1	0+1	0	2+4	17
20	DF	4	(Brazil) David Luiz	11+1	—				12
20	MF	44	(France) Gaël Kakuta	1+4	0+1	1	0	2+3	12
22	MF	10	(Israel) Yossi Benayoun	1+6	0	1	0+1	1	10
23	DF	43	(Netherlands) Jeffrey Bruma	1+1	0+1	1	0+1	1+1	7
24	DF	38	(Netherlands) Patrick van Aanholt	0	1	1	0	1+3	6
25	GK	22	(England) Ross Turnbull	0	0	1	0	1	2
26	DF	34	(England) Ryan Bertrand	0+1	0	0	0	0	1
26	GK	40	(Portugal) Henrique Hilário	0	0	0	1	0	1
26	MF	52	(England) Jacob Mellis	0	0	0	0	0+1	1

=== Goalscorers ===
As of end of season

Rnk	Pos	No.	Player	Premier League	FA Cup	League Cup	Community Shield	Champions League	Total
1	FW	39	(France) Nicolas Anelka	6	1	2	0	7	16
2	MF	15	(France) Florent Malouda	13	0	0	0	1	14
3	MF	8	(England) Frank Lampard	10	3	0	0	0	13
3	FW	11	(Ivory Coast) Didier Drogba	11	0	0	0	2	13
3	FW	21	(Ivory Coast) Salomon Kalou	10	2	0	1	0	13
6	DF	2	(Serbia) Branislav Ivanović	4	0	0	0	2	6
7	MF	5	(Ghana) Michael Essien	3	0	0	0	1	4
7	FW	23	(England) Daniel Sturridge	0	2	0	0	2	4
7	DF	26	(England) John Terry	3	0	0	0	1	4
10	DF	4	(Brazil) David Luiz	2	—				2
10	MF	7	(Brazil) Ramires	1	0	0	—	0	1
10	DF	33	(Brazil) Alex	1	0	0	0	0	1
13	FW	9	(Spain) Fernando Torres	1	—			0	1
13	MF	10	(Israel) Yossi Benayoun	1	0	0	0	0	1
13	DF	18	(Russia) Yuri Zhirkov	0	0	0	0	1	1
13	DF	38	(Netherlands) Patrick van Aanholt	0	0	1	0	0	1
—	Own Goals			1	1	0	0	0	2
TOTALS				69	9	3	1	17	99

=== Clean sheets ===
As of end of season

No.	Player	Premier League	FA Cup	League Cup	Community Shield	Champions League	Total
1	(Czech Republic) Petr Čech	15	1	0	0	4	20
TOTALS		15	1	0	0	4	20

=== Disciplinary record ===
As of end of season

Rnk	Pos.	No.	Player	PL		CL		League Cup		FA Cup		Total (FA Total)		
Rnk	Pos.	No.	Player	Yellow card	Red card	Yellow card	(yellow card) (yellow-red card)	Yellow card	Red card	Yellow card	Red card	Yellow card	(yellow card) (yellow-red card)	Red card
1	MF	7	(Brazil) Ramires	7	0	2	1	0	0	1	0	10 (8)	1 (0)	0
2	DF	2	(Serbia) Branislav Ivanović	12	0	0	0	0	0	0	0	12 (12)	0	0
3	MF	5	(Ghana) Michael Essien	5	1	1	0	0	0	0	0	6 (5)	0	1 (1)
4	FW	11	(Ivory Coast) Didier Drogba	6	0	1	0	0	0	0	0	7 (6)	0	0
4	DF	26	(England) John Terry	5	0	2	0	0	0	0	0	7 (5)	0	0
6	MF	12	(Nigeria) Mikel John Obi	3	0	2	0	0	0	0	0	5 (3)	0	0
7	DF	3	(England) Ashley Cole	4	0	0	0	0	0	0	0	4 (4)	0	0
7	MF	15	(France) Florent Malouda	1	0	2	0	0	0	1	0	4 (2)	0	0
9	DF	4	(Brazil) David Luiz	3	0	—						3 (3)	0	0
9	FW	9	(Spain) Fernando Torres	1	0	2	0	—				3 (1)	0	0
9	DF	18	(Russia) Yuri Zhirkov	1	0	2	0	0	0	0	0	3 (1)	0	0
9	DF	33	(Brazil) Alex	3	0	0	0	0	0	0	0	3 (3)	0	0
13	MF	8	(England) Frank Lampard	2	0	0	0	0	0	0	0	2 (2)	0	0
13	DF	19	(Portugal) Paulo Ferreira	2	0	0	0	0	0	0	0	2 (2)	0	0
15	DF	17	(Portugal) José Bosingwa	1	0	0	0	0	0	0	0	1 (1)	0	0
15	FW	21	(Ivory Coast) Salomon Kalou	1	0	0	0	0	0	0	0	1 (1)	0	0
15	DF	43	(Netherlands) Jeffrey Bruma	0	0	0	0	1	0	0	0	1 (1)	0	0
15	MF	46	(England) Josh McEachran	1	0	0	0	0	0	0	0	1 (1)	0	0
TOTALS				59	1	14	1	1	0	2	0	76 (62)	1 (0)	1 (1)

=== Overall ===
As of end of season

Games played	53 (38 Premier League, 10 UEFA Champions League, 3 FA Cup, 1 League Cup, 1 Community Shield)
Games won	28 (21 Premier League, 6 UEFA Champions League, 1 FA Cup)
Games drawn	11 (8 Premier League, 1 UEFA Champions League, 2 FA Cup)
Games lost	14 (9 Premier League, 3 UEFA Champions League, 1 League Cup, 1 Community Shield)
Goals scored	99 (69 Premier League, 17 UEFA Champions League, 9 FA Cup, 3 League Cup, 1 Community Shield)
Goals conceded	49 (33 Premier League, 7 UEFA Champions League, 2 FA Cup, 4 League Cup, 3 Community Shield)
Goal difference	+50 (+36 Premier League, +10 UEFA Champions League, +7 FA Cup, -1 League Cup, -2 Community Shield)
Clean sheets	20 (15 Premier League, 4 UEFA Champions League, 1 FA Cup)
Yellow cards	76 (59 Premier League, 14 UEFA Champions League, 2 FA Cup, 1 League Cup)
Red cards	2 (1 Premier League, 1 UEFA Champions League)
Worst discipline	(Brazil) Ramires 10 (yellow card) 1 (yellow card) (yellow-red card)
Best result(s)	W 7 – 0 (H) v Ipswich Town – FA Cup – 9 January 2011
Worst result(s)	L 0 – 3 (H) v Sunderland – Premier League – 14 November 2010
Most appearances	Petr Čech & Florent Malouda (50 appearances)
Top scorer	(France) Nicolas Anelka (16 goals)
Top assister	(Ivory Coast) Didier Drogba (20 assists)
Points	Overall: 94/159 (59.12%)

== Awards ==
No.	Name	Country	Award
44	Gaël Kakuta	France	2010 UEFA European Under-19 Football Championship Golden Player
—	Carlo Ancelotti	Italy	Manager of the Month (August 2010, March 2011 & April 2011)
1	Petr Čech	Czech Republic	2010 & 2011 Golden Ball (Czech Republic)
4	David Luiz	Brazil	Player of the Month (March 2011)
3	Ashley Cole	England	In the 2010–11 Premier League Team of the Year
(England) Chelsea F.C.			Barclays Premier League Fair Play Award
