= 2009–10 Premier Reserve League =

Premier Reserve League
- Season: 2009–10
- Champions: Manchester United Reserves
- Goals: 479
- Average goals/game: 2.94
- Top goalscorer: (England) Ryan Noble (10)
- Biggest home win: West Ham United Reserves 6–0 Birmingham City Reserves (8 September 2009)
- Biggest away win: Chelsea Reserves 0–4 Aston Villa Reserves (25 August 2009); Birmingham City Reserves 0-4 Arsenal Reserves (1 September 2009); Sunderland Reserves 1–5 Hull City Reserves (1 September 2009); Sunderland Reserves 0–4 Manchester United Reserves (21 January 2010)
- Highest scoring: Portsmouth Reserves 2–5 Chelsea Reserves (1 September 2009); Wigan Athletic Reserves 3-4 Manchester City Reserves (15 September 2009); Sunderland Reserves 6–1 Bolton Wanderers Reserves (3 November 2009); Wigan 2–5 Everton Reserves (10 November 2009); West Ham United Reserves 5–2 Stoke City Reserves (24 November 2009); Manchester United Reserves 6–1 Hull City Reserves (8 April 2010)
- Longest winning run: 7 games - Liverpool Reserves (2 September 2009 – 10 November 2009)
- Longest unbeaten run: 15 games - Aston Villa Reserves (25 August 2009 – 15 April 2010)
- Longest losing run: 7 games - Bolton Wanderers Reserves (19 October 2009 – 15 February 2010)
- Highest attendance: 2,803 – Blackburn Rovers Reserves v Manchester United Reserves (24 February 2010)
- Lowest attendance: 87 – Portsmouth Reserves v Stoke City Reserves (16 March 2010)

The 2009–10 Premier Reserve League (officially known as the 2009–10 Barclays Premier Reserve League for sponsorship reasons) was the eleventh season since the establishment of the Premier Reserve League. The season began on 24 August 2009 and ended with the play-off final being hosted by the Northern League champions on 3 May 2010 (The venue for the final alternates between the Northern & Southern champions).

The events in the senior leagues during the 2008–09 season saw Middlesbrough, Newcastle United and West Bromwich Albion all relegated and replaced by the promoted teams Burnley, Wolverhampton Wanderers, and Birmingham City. Tottenham Hotspur will not be entering a team for this season.

On 12 April 2010, in a behind closed doors fixture at their Bodymoor Heath training ground, Aston Villa beat Fulham 2–1 with goals from Barry Bannan and Ciaran Clark to book their place in the playoff final with 2 league games to spare.

On 20 April, Liverpool lost 1–0 at home to Everton. This was their 4th defeat in a row, and it handed the Premier Reserve League North title to Manchester United.

The playoff final went to a penalty shoot out where Manchester United beat Aston Villa 3–2. Goalkeeper Ben Foster scored the decisive penalty kick. The match had finished 3–3 in normal time.

== Tables ==
=== Premier Reserve League North ===
Final table as of 4 May 2010

Pos	Club	Pld	W	D	L	F	A	GD	Pts
1	Manchester United Reserves (C)	18	13	2	3	35	10	+25	41
2	Manchester City Reserves	18	10	5	3	34	20	+14	35
3	Liverpool Reserves	18	10	2	6	28	20	+8	32
4	Blackburn Rovers Reserves	18	8	5	5	35	24	+11	29
5	Sunderland Reserves	18	7	1	10	25	32	−7	22
6	Wigan Athletic Reserves	18	6	3	9	28	35	−7	21
7	Burnley Reserves	18	6	3	9	22	36	–14	21
8	Hull City Reserves	18	6	2	10	22	26	–4	20
9	Everton Reserves	18	5	3	10	17	30	–13	18
10	Bolton Wanderers Reserves	18	5	2	11	24	37	–13	17

=== Premier Reserve League South ===
Final table as of 27 April 2010

Pos	Club	Pld	W	D	L	F	A	GD	Pts
1	Aston Villa Reserves (C)	16	11	4	1	34	12	+22	37
2	Arsenal Reserves	16	10	2	4	28	14	+14	32
3	Fulham Reserves	16	8	4	4	25	19	+6	28
4	Chelsea Reserves	16	7	1	8	27	26	+1	22
5	Portsmouth Reserves	16	6	3	7	21	27	–6	21
6	West Ham United Reserves	16	5	4	7	26	27	–1	19
7	Birmingham City Reserves	16	4	3	9	14	34	−20	15
8	Wolverhampton Wanderers Reserves	16	3	5	8	16	21	−5	14
9	Stoke City Reserves	16	3	4	9	13	24	–11	13

Rules for classification: 1st points; 2nd goal difference; 3rd goals scored
Pos = Position; Pld = Matches played; W = Matches won; D = Matches drawn; L = Matches lost; F = Goals for; A = Goals against; GD = Goal difference; Pts = Points; C = Champions

== Play-off Final ==
3 May 2010
15:00 BST

Manchester United Reserves	3–3	Aston Villa Reserves
Mame Biram Diouf 43', 88'; Federico Macheda 60' (pen.)	Report	Nathan Delfouneso 22', 55'; Ciaran Clark 82'
Penalties
Federico Macheda (penalty scored); Rodrigo Possebon (penalty scored); Will Keane (penalty missed); Ben Foster (penalty scored); Corry Evans (penalty missed)	3–2	(penalty scored) Barry Bannan; (penalty missed) Marc Albrighton; (penalty scored) Andreas Weimann; (penalty missed) Nathan Delfouneso; (penalty missed) James Collins

Old Trafford, Manchester
Attendance: 2,165
Referee: Lee Mason (Lancashire)

== Results ==
=== Premier Reserve League North ===
	Bla	Bol	Bur	Eve	Hul	Liv	MCi	MUn	Sun	Wig
Bla		1–2	4–0	4-0	1–0	3–2	1–1	1–1	4–2	2–2
Bol	3–3		1–2	0–1	1–2	1–2	1–3	1–3	2–1	3–0
Bur	3–2	3–3		2–3	2–1	3–1	1–4	0-1	0–1	2–2
Eve	0–3	1–2	3–0		0–0	0–1	0–0	0–1	1–1	1–4
Hul	1–0	1–2	1–1	2–0		0–1	0–1	1–2	2–0	3–0
Liv	1-2	3–1	1–0	0–1	4–1		3–3	1–0	2–0	1–1
MCi	0–0	2–0	1–2	4–1	2–0	0–2		1–0	1–2	2–0
MUn	3–0	1–0	2–0	2–0	6–1	1–0	2–2		4–0	2–1
Sun	3–1	6–1	0–1	2–0	1–5	0–1	2–3	0–4		3–0
Wig	0–3	2–0	5–0	2–5	2–1	3–2	3–4	1–0	0–1	

=== Premier Reserve League South ===
	Ars	Ast	Bir	Che	Ful	Por	Sto	Wes	Wol
Ars		1–2	3–1	2–0	3–0	0–2	1–0	0–2	1–0
Ast	1–1		4–0	3–1	2–1	2–0	2–0	2–1	1–1
Bir	0–4	3–3		0–1	1–1	2–3	1–0	2–1	1–0
Che	1–2	0–4	1–2		3–3	1–0	3–0	4–1	2–0
Ful	1–0	0–3	3–0	2–1		1–0	2–0	1–1	1–1
Por	0–3	3–1	2–1	2–5	0–2		1–1	3–0	2–2
Sto	0–1	0–0	0–0	3–2	1–3	4–0		0–0	1–0
Wes	2–4	0–1	6–0	2–1	3-2	1–1	5–2		0–0
Wol	2–2	0–3	2–0	0–1	0–2	1–2	3–1	4–1	

== Top scorers ==
=== Premier Reserve League North ===
Rank	Player	Team	Goals
1	(England) Ryan Noble	Sunderland Reserves	10
2	(England) David Ball	Manchester City Reserves	7
2	(Poland) Tomasz Kupisz	Wigan Athletic Reserves	7
4	(Senegal) Mame Diouf	Manchester United Reserves	6
4	(Liberia) Alex Nimely	Manchester City Reserves	6
6	(England) Wes Fletcher	Burnley Reserves	5
6	(Slovakia) Róbert Mak	Manchester City Reserves	5
6	(Central African Republic) Frédéric Nimani	Burnley Reserves	5
6	(England) James Poole	Manchester City Reserves	5
6	(England) Danny Ward	Bolton Wanderers Reserves	5
11	(Poland) Tomasz Cywka	Wigan Athletic Reserves	4
11	(Republic of Ireland) Aaron Doran	Blackburn Rovers Reserves	4
11	(England) David Dowson	Sunderland Reserves	4
11	(England) Nathan Eccleston	Liverpool Reserves	4
11	(Norway) Magnus Eikrem	Manchester United Reserves	4
11	(Republic of Ireland) Roy O'Donovan	Sunderland Reserves	4
11	(Netherlands) Maceo Rigters	Blackburn Rovers Reserves	4
11	(Serbia) Zoran Tošić	Manchester United Reserves	4
11	(Portugal) Ricardo Vaz Tê	Bolton Wanderers Reserves	4

=== Premier Reserve League South ===
Rank	Player	Team	Goals
1	(Austria) Andreas Weimann	Aston Villa Reserves	9
2	(England) Louis Moult	Stoke City Reserves	7
3	(England) Nathan Delfouneso	Aston Villa Reserves	6
4	(Italy) Fabio Borini	Chelsea Reserves	5
4	(England) Daniel Sturridge	Chelsea Reserves	5
4	(England) Sanchez Watt	Arsenal Reserves	5
7	(Netherlands) Nacer Barazite	Arsenal Reserves	4
7	(Republic of Ireland) Ciaran Clark	Aston Villa Reserves	4
7	(Netherlands) Danny Hoesen	Fulham Reserves	4
7	(France) Frédéric Piquionne	Portsmouth Reserves	4
7	(Togo) Gilles Sunu	Arsenal Reserves	4

== Promotion and relegation ==
- Teams relegated from the Premier Reserve League at the end of this season:
- Hull City
- Burnley
- Portsmouth
- Teams promoted to the Premier Reserve League next season:
- Newcastle United
- West Bromwich Albion
- Blackpool

== See also ==
- 2009–10 Premier Academy League
- 2009–10 FA Youth Cup
- 2009–10 Premier League
- 2009–10 in English football

Premier Reserve League North	Premier Reserve League South
Blackburn Rovers; Bolton Wanderers; Burnley; Everton; Hull City; Liverpool; Manchester City; Manchester United; Sunderland; Wigan Athletic	Arsenal; Aston Villa; Birmingham City; Chelsea; Fulham; Portsmouth; Stoke City; West Ham United; Wolverhampton Wanderers
