= Sam Walker (footballer) =

English footballer (born 1991)

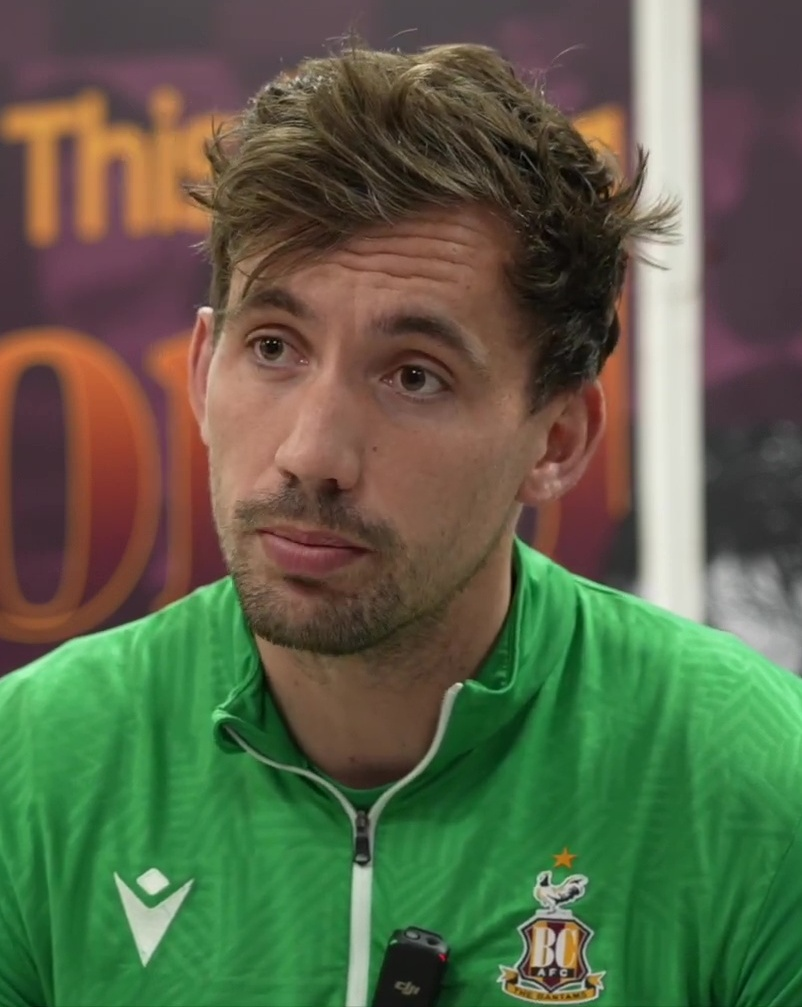
- Walker in 2024

Personal information
- Full name: Samuel Colin Walker
- Date of birth: 2 October 1991 (age 35)
- Place of birth: Gravesend, England
- Height: 6 ft 6 in (1.98 m)
- Position: Goalkeeper

Team information
- Current team: Watford
- Number: 24

Youth career
- –2007: Millwall
- 2007–2010: Chelsea

Senior career*
Years	Team	Apps	(Gls)
2010–2014	Chelsea	0	(0)
2011	→ Barnet (loan)	7	(0)
2011	→ Northampton Town (loan)	21	(0)
2012	→ Yeovil Town (loan)	20	(0)
2012–2013	→ Bristol Rovers (loan)	11	(0)
2013	→ Colchester United (loan)	19	(0)
2013–2014	→ Colchester United (loan)	26	(0)
2014–2018	Colchester United	155	(0)
2018–2021	Reading	7	(0)
2020–2021	→ Blackpool (loan)	2	(0)
2021	→ AFC Wimbledon (loan)	12	(0)
2021–2023	Kilmarnock	29	(0)
2023–2024	Charlton Athletic	0	(0)
2024–2026	Bradford City	112	(0)
2026–	Watford	0	(0)
- * Club domestic league appearances and goals as of 22:10, 9 May 2026 (UTC)

Samuel Colin Walker (born 2 October 1991) is an English professional footballer who plays as a goalkeeper for EFL Championship side Watford.

Walker progressed through the youth ranks at Millwall and Chelsea, although he failed to make an appearance for either club. He was loaned from Chelsea to Barnet, Northampton Town, Yeovil Town, Bristol Rovers and Colchester United on two occasions. He made his move to Colchester permanent in January 2014. He made over 200 appearances in total for Colchester.

== Career ==
=== Chelsea ===
Born in Gravesend, Kent, Walker spent his childhood career playing for local club Gravesend & Northfleet but was later signed by Millwall. Chelsea were given permission to speak to a 15-year-old Walker after a £500,000 bid was accepted by the Lions in September 2007. He joined Norwich City on a youth loan in March 2009, playing for the under-19s to cover an international call-up for Jed Steer and an injury to Declan Rudd.

Walker was a member of the successful 2009–10 FA Youth Cup-winning squad with Chelsea. He and the team conceded just three goals throughout the entire competition. Having been a regular in the Chelsea youth sides, he subsequently became a regular at reserve team level

==== Barnet loan ====
Walker joined struggling League Two side Barnet on loan on 24 March 2011 until the end of the season. He made his Football League and professional debut two days later as the Bees came back from two goals down to draw with Chesterfield at Underhill. He was shown a red card for a second bookable offence in added time of a 2–1 home victory over Crewe Alexandra on 9 April, but a 3–1 away defeat to Accrington Stanley on 30 April left Barnet on the brink of relegation. However, on the final day of the season, with other results working in their favour, Barnet remained a Football League side as Walker kept his first clean sheet in a 1–0 victory over Port Vale. He ended his time with the Bees with seven league appearances.

==== Northampton Town loan ====
Northampton Town boss Gary Johnson signed Walker on a season-long loan from Chelsea on 11 July 2011 following his successful stint at Barnet. He made his debut for the Cobblers in an opening day 0–0 draw with Accrington on 5 August. Northampton suffered a string of heavy defeats, including a 7–2 home defeat by Shrewsbury Town on 19 November with the club having parted company with Gary Johnson earlier the same week. New manager Aidy Boothroyd offered the players a chance to impress him following significant defeats to Plymouth Argyle and Gillingham However, on 23 December, having made 24 appearances for the club, Boothroyd decided to send Walker back to Chelsea after announcing that Shane Higgs would be his first-choice goalkeeper.

==== Yeovil Town loan ====
Walker made the step up to League One football in 2012, signing on loan with Yeovil Town on 19 January until the end of the season, once again teaming up with Gary Johnson. He made his Yeovil debut on 21 January as they fell to a 3–2 away defeat at Bury. With the club struggling near the relegation zone, Walker put in some impressive performances, including a penalty save against Milton Keynes Dons as the Glovers went on to record a 1–0 victory and in turn boost their hopes of survival. Manager Johnson described a "horrendous mistake" by Walker in a 3–0 defeat to Charlton Athletic as a "lapse in concentration", with Walker describing his own recent performances as a "lapse in form". Walker retained his place in the first-team, and despite a 6–0 defeat by Stevenage, Yeovil survived their relegation battle and Walker completed his loan spell with 20 league appearances.

==== Bristol Rovers loan ====
Bristol Rovers signed Walker on loan on 14 August 2012 until 2 January 2013. He made his debut in a League Cup clash with Ipswich Town the same day, a match which the Pirates lost 3–1. Walker made 14 appearances at the Memorial Stadium, but failed to establish himself as a regular, with fellow loanee and former Chelsea trainee Neil Etheridge becoming first choice goalkeeper for the League Two side.

==== Colchester United loans ====
Walker first joined Colchester United on 14 January 2013, stepping up to League One for the second half of the 2012–13 season. Walker joined until the end of the season alongside fellow Chelsea player Billy Clifford with the U's having dropped into the bottom four in the table. He made his debut on 26 January and immediately kept a clean sheet as Colchester defeated Walsall 2–0 to end a run of nine league games without a point, the club's worst ever run. Walker produced clean sheets at former club Yeovil and Stevenage, as well as some important saves to secure points in wins against Bury and a penalty save against Leyton Orient. Walker kept another clean sheet on the final day of the season with a 2–0 away victory at Carlisle United, ensuring Colchester remained in League One for another season as they finished 20th in the table. He ended his first loan stint at the club with 19 league appearances.

Having been influential in goal in the second half of the 2012–13 season, on 19 July 2013, Walker rejoined Colchester on a six-month loan deal, keeping him at the club until 19 January. He kept a clean sheet in the opening day victory at Gillingham on 3 August. He conceded an own goal against Sheffield United in a home FA Cup tie on 9 November as Colchester slipped to a 3–2 defeat. In December 2013, with his contract expiring at the end of the season, Walker announced he needed to discuss his future with Chelsea before deciding whether to extend his loan spell at Colchester or pay attention to interest from elsewhere. Walker then played the final game of his loan spell away at Carlisle on 18 December, spilling a late free kick to concede a goal, although the U's went on to win 4–2. He amassed a further 29 appearances for Colchester in all competitions in his second loan period.

=== Colchester United ===
Following his two loan spells with the club in the 2012–13 and 2013–14 seasons, Walker signed for the League One club on a permanent basis on 20 January 2014 on an 18-month contract. Owing to a string of postponed games due to waterlogged pitches, Walker's first appearance as a full-time U's player didn't arrive until 11 February, when Colchester lost 2–0 at Port Vale. Walker signed a contract extension with the club in December 2014 to remain with Colchester until the summer of 2016.

Despite being ruled out of the first half of the 2015–16 season, Walker signed a new contract extension on 22 December 2015 to remain at the Colchester Community Stadium until the summer of 2018. Being ruled out for the entire season, Walker made just one solitary appearance during the 2015–16 season.

Walker made his first start in almost one year on 6 August 2016 in Colchester's 1–1 draw with Hartlepool United at Victoria Park on the opening day of the 2016–17 season. He played every league game in the 2016–17 season, making a total of 48 appearances throughout the campaign.

On 29 June 2018, Colchester manager John McGreal announced that Walker had left the club after failing to agree a new contract. He had made 47 appearances across the 2017–18 season and made 213 total appearances for the club including his loan spells.

=== Reading ===
On 25 July 2018, Walker signed a three-year contract with Reading.

==== Blackpool loan ====
On 23 December 2020, Walker joined League One side Blackpool on an emergency one-week loan after their first-team goalkeeper Chris Maxwell tested positive for Coronavirus. On 30 December, the loan was extended for a further seven days.

==== AFC Wimbledon loan ====
On 11 January 2021, Walker joined League One side AFC Wimbledon on loan for the remainder of the 2020-21 season.

=== Kilmarnock ===
In July 2021, Walker signed a two-year deal with Scottish Championship side Kilmarnock.

=== Charlton Athletic ===
On 16 October 2023, Walker joined Charlton Athletic on a short-term deal until January 2024.

=== Bradford City ===
On 11 January 2024, Walker joined Bradford City following the expiration of his short-term contract at Charlton Athletic. At the end of the 2024–25 season, Bradford City entered into discussions with him regarding a new contract.

=== Watford ===
On 12 August 2026, Walker joined EFL Championship side Watford on a one-year deal.

== Career statistics ==
As of match played 14 May 2026

Appearances and goals by club, season and competition
Club	Season	League			FA Cup		League Cup		Other		Total	
Club	Season	Division	Apps	Goals	Apps	Goals	Apps	Goals	Apps	Goals	Apps	Goals
Chelsea	2010–11	Premier League	0	0	0	0	0	0	—		0	0
Chelsea	2011–12	Premier League	0	0	0	0	0	0	—		0	0
Chelsea	2012–13	Premier League	0	0	0	0	0	0	—		0	0
Chelsea	2013–14	Premier League	0	0	0	0	0	0	—		0	0
Chelsea	Total		0	0	0	0	0	0	—		0	0
Barnet (loan)	2010–11	League Two	7	0	0	0	0	0	0	0	7	0
Northampton Town (loan)	2011–12	League Two	21	0	1	0	2	0	1 (Note: Appearance(s) in Football League Trophy)	0	25	0
Yeovil Town (loan)	2011–12	League One	20	0	0	0	0	0	0	0	20	0
Bristol Rovers (loan)	2012–13	League Two	11	0	1	0	1	0	1	0	14	0
Colchester United (loan)	2012–13	League One	19	0	0	0	0	0	0	0	19	0
Colchester United (loan)	2013–14	League One	26	0	1	0	1	0	1	0	29	0
Colchester United (loan)	Total		45	0	1	0	1	0	1	0	48	0
Colchester United	2013–14	League One	20	0	0	0	0	0	0	0	20	0
Colchester United	2014–15	League One	45	0	3	0	0	0	1	0	49	0
Colchester United	2015–16	League One	0	0	0	0	1	0	0	0	1	0
Colchester United	2016–17	League Two	46	0	1	0	0	0	1 (Note: Appearance(s) in EFL Trophy)	0	48	0
Colchester United	2017–18	League Two	44	0	1	0	1	0	1	0	47	0
Colchester United	Total		155	0	5	0	2	0	3	0	165	0
Reading	2018–19	Championship	7	0	0	0	2	0	—		9	0
Reading	2019–20	Championship	0	0	4	0	1	0	—		5	0
Reading	2020–21	Championship	0	0	0	0	0	0	—		0	0
Reading	Total		7	0	4	0	3	0	—		14	0
Blackpool (loan)	2020–21	League One	2	0	0	0	0	0	0	0	2	0
AFC Wimbledon (loan)	2020–21	League One	12	0	0	0	0	0	2	0	14	0
Kilmarnock	2021–22	Scottish Championship	1	0	1	0	3	0	4	0	9	0
Kilmarnock	2022–23	Scottish Premiership	28	0	2	0	4	0	0	0	34	0
Kilmarnock	Total		29	0	3	0	7	0	4	0	43	0
Charlton Athletic	2023–24	League One	0	0	2	0	0	0	1	0	3	0
Bradford City	2023–24	League Two	20	0	—		—		—		20	0
Bradford City	2024–25	League Two	46	0	2	0	1	0	3	0	52	0
Bradford City	2025–26	League One	46	0	1	0	3	0	3 (Note: One appearance in the EFL Trophy and two appearances in the EFL League One play-offs)	0	53	0
Bradford City	Total		112	0	3	0	4	0	6	0	125	0
Career total			421	0	20	0	20	0	19	0	480	0

== Honours ==
Chelsea Youth

- FA Youth Cup: 2009–10

Bradford City

- League Two promotion: 2024–25
