= Conor Clifford =

Irish professional footballer

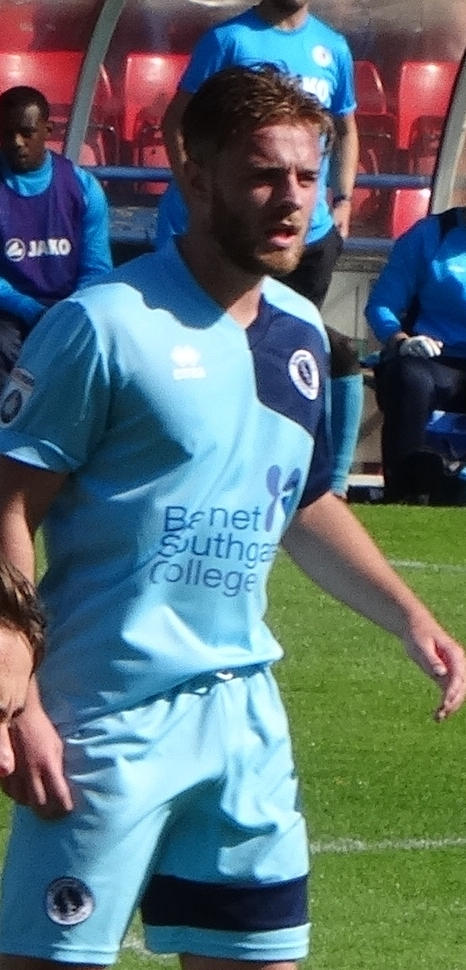
- Clifford playing for Boreham Wood in 2016

Personal information
- Full name: Conor Paul Clifford
- Date of birth: 1 October 1991 (age 35)
- Place of birth: Dublin, Ireland
- Height: 1.73 m (5 ft 8 in)
- Position: Midfielder

Team information
- Current team: Lucan United

Youth career
- –2007: Crumlin United
- 2007–2009: Chelsea

Senior career*
Years	Team	Apps	(Gls)
2009–2013	Chelsea	0	(0)
2010	→ Plymouth Argyle (loan)	7	(0)
2011	→ Notts County (loan)	9	(0)
2011–2012	→ Yeovil Town (loan)	7	(0)
2012	→ Portsmouth (loan)	2	(1)
2012–2013	→ Crawley Town (loan)	1	(0)
2013	Leicester City	0	(0)
2013–2015	Southend United	36	(3)
2015	→ Barnet (loan)	13	(1)
2015–2017	Boreham Wood	64	(2)
2017	Dundalk	17	(0)
2018	Limerick	11	(0)
2018–2019	St Patrick's Athletic	34	(4)
2020	Derry City	11	(2)
2021–2022	Bray Wanderers	37	(4)
2023–	Lucan United	39	(3)

International career
2007–2008	Republic of Ireland U17	12	(0)
2008–2010	Republic of Ireland U19	20	(5)
2009–2012	Republic of Ireland U21	13	(0)
- * Club domestic league appearances and goals as of 14:06 14 August 2023

Conor Paul Clifford (born 1 October 1991) is an Irish professional footballer who plays as a midfielder for Lucan United. He is a former Republic of Ireland youth international and has represented them at under-17, under-19, and under-21 level. He has been called into the senior Ireland squad but is uncapped.

== Club career ==
=== Early career ===
Clifford began his career with Cherry Orchard and Crumlin United, and played in the Dublin District Schoolboys League in Ireland.

=== Chelsea ===
Clifford moved to England in 2007 to sign for Chelsea as a member of their Academy. He signed a full-time scholarship in June 2008. He made 25 appearances for the youth team during the 2009–10 season, scoring three goals. After progressing into the reserve team, where he scored twice in ten appearances, Clifford captained the youth team as they won the FA Youth Cup in 2010. He scored the decisive goal in the final as they were crowned champions for the first time since 1961. Clifford joined Plymouth Argyle on an initial one-month loan in October 2010. He made his senior debut the next day in a 2–1 win against Huddersfield Town. "I'm still learning the game, and it's all good experience for me playing in front of big crowds and with these lads," he said. "I just want to keep myself in the team and keep playing well for Plymouth."

His loan was extended in November, and he continued to play regularly before returning to Chelsea in December. Both clubs had agreed to another extension, but the Football League declined his registration due to Argyle's financial difficulties. "What will be will be, but it's a blow," said Peter Reid. "I've got to say that. He's been a breath of fresh air. He's enthusiastic, presses the ball, and has been our leader for such a young man while Fletcher has been out injured; a tremendous character." On 11 February 2011 Clifford signed on a one-month loan for League One club Notts County. He returned to Chelsea on 7 April 2011, having made nine appearances for County.

He joined League One Yeovil Town on another loan deal and extend his loan spell in December. During his second spell at Yeovil, Clifford scored in the second round of the FA Cup against Fleetwood Town. In January, Clifford would make his return to Chelsea after two months spell. One month after his spell at Yeovil, Clifford signed a new deal, keeping him until 2013.

At the start of 2012–13 season, Clifford went on a trial with League One struggler Portsmouth and join them on loan on a one-month loan deal. Clifford made his debut for the club in a 1–1 draw against Bournemouth on 18 August 2012 and scored his first goal in a 90th minutes in a 4–2 loss against Carlisle United. However, his loan spell at Portsmouth was short-lived after the club decided against extending his loan deal.

On 22 November 2012, Clifford joined League One side Crawley Town on a loan until 5 January 2013.

On 4 January 2013, Clifford was released by Chelsea in advance, with the hope of quickly finding new clubs before hundreds of others find themselves in a similar situation around the country. Head of youth development Neil Bath discussed the thinking behind the move, "Conor came over from Ireland at Under-15. We've always given him support and help that comes with bringing someone from abroad without their immediate friends and family with them. I hope to keep in contact with him. He had a fantastic time in the Youth Cup for us, and his challenge is to adjust from youth to men's football. He's gaining some fantastic experience with the Irish national team and he's a gusty, determined, hard-tackling player, who has scored a lot of goals. I hope a club goes with him."

=== Leicester City ===
On 18 February 2013, Clifford played in a reserve game for Leicester City against Birmingham City featuring in midfield and scoring the winning goal with a right-footed drive from inside the box. Clifford had been on trial at the club following his release from Chelsea in January 2013. After featuring in a couple more reserve games for Leicester City, Clifford signed a short-term contract until the end of the 2012–13 season on 9 March. However, Clifford made no appearances for the club and was released at the end of the 2012–13 season.

=== Southend United ===
Clifford signed a two-year contract with Southend United on 1 August 2013. Clifford had previously gone on trial with the club for the pre-season friendly in Spain. Clifford made his debut, in the opening game of the season, coming on as a substitute in the 86th minute, in a 1–0 win over Plymouth Argyle. Clifford scored his first Southend goal on 5 October 2013 in a 2–0 win over Oxford United. He was released by Southend following their promotion to League One in 2015.

=== Barnet (loan) ===
Clifford joined Barnet on loan on 2 February 2015. He scored his first goal for Barnet, with a 25-yard curling shot, in a 3–1 defeat at home against Grimsby Town on 21 February 2015.

=== Boreham Wood ===
Clifford signed for Boreham Wood on 7 August 2015. He made his first appearance for the club the following day, in a 3–1 win against FC Halifax Town.

=== Dundalk ===
In January 2017, Clifford signed for Dundalk. He made his debut on 17 February 2017, when he came on as a second-half substitute in the 2017 President of Ireland's Cup final defeat to Cork City. On 6 October, Clifford was banned from worldwide football for six months after admitting an FA charge in relation to betting during his time in England.

=== Limerick ===
Clifford joined Limerick on 10 April 2018 upon the expiration of his worldwide football ban. He made his debut for the club 4 days later in a 2–1 defeat at the hands of Sligo Rovers at Markets Field. His time on Shannonside lasted a mere seven weeks with the club running into financial difficulties.

=== St Patrick's Athletic ===
Clifford signed for St Patrick's Athletic on 2 July 2018. He made his debut for the club on 20 July 2018 in a 2–1 victory against former club Limerick. He scored against IFK Norrköping in the 2019–20 UEFA Europa League https://www.irishmirror.ie/sport/soccer/ik-norrkoping-v-st-pats-18338014

== International career ==
Clifford was a Republic of Ireland international under-17, under-19 and now is currently an under-21 international for Ireland. He made regular appearances for the under-19s scoring three times in ten appearances, going on to playing for the under-21s. On 10 August 2011, he was called up to the senior team for the friendly against Croatia and was an unused sub for the game. On 9 October 2012, he was called into the senior squad for their 2014 FIFA World Cup qualifier against Germany on 12 October.

== Career statistics ==
As of match played 21 October 2022.

Appearances and goals by club, season and competition
Club	Season	League			National Cup		League Cup		Europe		Other		Total	
Club	Season	Division	Apps	Goals	Apps	Goals	Apps	Goals	Apps	Goals	Apps	Goals	Apps	Goals
Chelsea	2009–10	Premier League	0	0	0	0	0	0	0	0	—		0	0
Chelsea	2010–11	Premier League	0	0	0	0	0	0	0	0	—		0	0
Chelsea	2011–12	Premier League	0	0	0	0	0	0	0	0	—		0	0
Chelsea	2012–13	Premier League	0	0	0	0	0	0	0	0	—		0	0
Plymouth Argyle (loan)	2010–11	League One	7	0	0	0	0	0	—		1 (Note: Appearance(s) in Football League Trophy)	0	8	0
Notts County (loan)	2010–11	League One	9	0	0	0	0	0	—		0	0	9	0
Yeovil Town (loan)	2011–12	League One	7	0	2	1	0	0	—		0	0	9	1
Portsmouth (loan)	2012–13	League One	2	1	0	0	0	0	—		1	0	3	1
Crawley Town (loan)	2012–13	League One	1	0	0	0	0	0	—		0	0	1	0
Leicester City	2012–13	Championship	0	0	0	0	0	0	—		—		0	0
Southend United	2013–14	League Two	24	1	2	0	1	0	—		1	0	28	1
Southend United	2014–15	League Two	12	2	0	0	1	0	—		0	0	13	2
Southend United	Total		36	3	2	0	2	0	—		1	0	41	3
Barnet (loan)	2014–15	Conference Premier	13	1	0	0	—		—		0	0	13	1
Boreham Wood	2015–16	National League	44	2	2	0	—		—		1 (Note: Appearance(s) in FA Trophy)	0	47	2
Boreham Wood	2016–17	National League	20	0	1	0	—		—		0	0	21	0
Boreham Wood	Total		64	2	3	0	—		—		1	0	68	2
Dundalk	2017	League of Ireland Premier Division	17	0	1	0	3	2	0	0	5	2	26	4
Limerick	2018	League of Ireland Premier Division	11	0	0	0	0	0	—		0	0	11	0
St Patrick's Athletic	2018	League of Ireland Premier Division	9	2	2	0	0	0	—		1	0	12	2
St Patrick's Athletic	2019	League of Ireland Premier Division	25	2	2	1	1	0	2 (Note: Appearance(s) in UEFA Europa League)	1	0	0	30	4
St Patrick's Athletic	Total		34	4	4	1	1	0	2	1	1	0	42	6
Derry City	2020	League of Ireland Premier Division	11	2	1	0	—		1	0	—		12	2
Bray Wanderers	2021	League of Ireland First Division	24	4	0	0	—		—		2 (Note: Appearances in 2021 League of Ireland promotion/relegation playoffs)	0	26	4
Bray Wanderers	2022	League of Ireland First Division	13	0	0	0	—		—		—		13	0
Bray Wanderers	Total		37	4	0	0	—		—		2	0	39	4
Career total			249	17	13	2	6	2	3	1	12	2	283	24

== Honours ==
Barnet

- Conference Premier: 2014/15

Dundalk

- League of Ireland Cup: 2017

Individual

- FAI Under-16 International Player of the Year: 2007
- FAI Under-19 International Player of the Year: 2010
