= Aziz Deen-Conteh =

Sierra Leonean footballer (born 1993)

Personal information
- Full name: Abdul Aziz Deen-Conteh
- Date of birth: 14 January 1993 (age 33)
- Place of birth: Bumpe, Sierra Leone
- Height: 1.76 m (5 ft 9 1/2 in)
- Position: Left back

Youth career
- 2006–2013: Chelsea

Senior career*
Years	Team	Apps	(Gls)
2013–2014	Ergotelis	7	(0)
2014–2016	Port Vale	0	(0)
2015	→ Boston United (loan)	5	(0)
2016	Zaria Bălți	6	(0)
2016	Zugdidi	4	(0)
2017–2018	Dover Athletic	4	(0)
2018	Dulwich Hamlet	0	(0)
Total		26	(0)

International career
2008	England U16	2	(0)
2010–2011	England U19	5	(0)
2016	Sierra Leone	2	(0)
- * Club domestic league appearances and goals

Abdul Aziz Deen-Conteh (born 14 January 1993) is a Sierra Leonean former professional footballer who played as a left-back.

He represented England at youth level whilst on the books at Chelsea. He spent the 2013–14 season with Greek club Ergotelis, making seven appearances in the Greek Super League. He joined Port Vale in November 2014 and was loaned out to Boston United in August 2015, but left Vale in January 2016 without making a first-team appearance. He moved on to Moldovan side Zaria Bălți – winning the Moldovan Cup in 2016 – and Georgian side Zugdidi, before he returned to England in August 2017 to sign with Dover Athletic.

== Club career ==
=== Chelsea ===
Deen-Conteh was born in Sierra Leone but grew up in Deptford, England, joining Chelsea at the age of 13. He played both legs of the club's FA Youth Cup final victory over Aston Villa in 2010. He was given a two-year professional contract by manager Carlo Ancelotti. He was a member of their Champions League squad for the 2012–13 season, though he did not make an appearance for them. After being released by the club in June 2013, he went on trial with Millwall the following month. He came close to joining Notts County, but negotiations broke down at the last minute.

=== Ergotelis ===
He signed a two-year contract with the Greek club Ergotelis in August 2013. He found the left-back spot occupied by the club captain. He made only seven first-team appearances at the Pankritio Stadium in the second half of the 2013–14 season. He left the club after the Greek financial crisis left the club unable to pay player's wages.

=== Port Vale ===
He began training with English League One side Port Vale in November 2014, and signed for the club on a deal running until summer 2017 after impressing during his trial spell.

He joined National League North club Boston United on a one-month loan on 11 August 2015. Again he found himself behind a club captain in the pecking order, with Carl Dickinson rarely missing a game at left-back. He was released by Port Vale in January 2016, having not made a first-team appearance at Vale Park. He went on to say "I didn't really get along with the gaffer", and said Rob Page "wasn't thinking about the players, he wasn't thinking about the club, he was thinking about himself".

=== Later career ===
Deen-Conteh joined Moldovan National Division club Zaria Bălți soon after leaving Port Vale. He played eight games for the club, including a substitute appearance in the 2016 final of the Moldovan Cup at Zimbru Stadium as Zaria beat Milsami Orhei 1–0 after extra time. After leaving the club, he considered signing with league rivals FC Milsami, but instead moved to Georgian side Zugdidi later in 2016. He left Zugdidi in October 2016 after the club struggled to pay his wages.

On 24 August 2017, Deen-Conteh returned to England to sign with National League side Dover Athletic. He made his debut for the "Whites" when he came off the bench in a 1–0 defeat at Macclesfield Town on 25 August. He went on to make a further three substitute appearances before he was released from the Crabble Athletic Ground upon the expiry of his contract at the end of the 2017–18 season. He spent time on the bench at Dulwich Hamlet in September 2018, without being signed to a contract.

== International career ==
Deen-Conteh represented England at youth international level, appearing for the under-16 and under-19 teams. In March 2013 he committed his international football to Sierra Leone, the country of his birth, after being called up by their senior national team; however, he was unable to play due to an expired passport. He was called up again in May 2013, alongside fellow Chelsea player Samuel Bangura. He was not given clearance to play for the senior team however and expressed doubts over whether he would accept any further call-ups as he criticised the Sierra Leone Football Association for their organisational skills. However, Deen-Conteh ended up getting called up and capped officially by Sierra Leone, and made his debut against Malawi.

== Career statistics ==
=== Club ===
Appearances and goals by club, season and competition
Club	Season	League			National cup (Note: Includes FA Cup, Greek Cup, Moldovan Cup, Georgian Cup)		League cup (Note: Includes EFL Cup)		Other		Total	
Club	Season	Division	Apps	Goals	Apps	Goals	Apps	Goals	Apps	Goals	Apps	Goals
Ergotelis	2013–14	Super League Greece	7	0	0	0	—		0	0	7	0
Port Vale	2014–15	League One	0	0	—		—		—		0	0
Port Vale	2015–16	League One	0	0	0	0	0	0	0	0	0	0
Port Vale	Total		0	0	0	0	0	0	0	0	0	0
Boston United (loan)	2015–16	National League North	5	0	0	0	—		0	0	5	0
Zaria Bălți	2015–16	Moldovan National Division	6	0	2	0	—		0	0	8	0
Zugdidi	2016	Umaglesi Liga	4	0	1	0	—		0	0	5	0
Dover Athletic	2017–18	National League	4	0	1	0	—		0	0	5	0
Dulwich Hamlet	2018–19	National League South	0	0	0	0	—		0	0	0	0
Career total			26	0	4	0	0	0	0	0	30	0

=== International ===
Sierra Leone national team
Year	Apps	Goals
2016	2	0
Total	2	0

== Honours ==
Chelsea

- FA Youth Cup: 2010

Zaria Bălți

- Moldovan Cup: 2016
