= Arsenio Halfhuid =

Dutch footballer

Personal information
- Full name: Arsenio Amerencio Halfhuid
- Date of birth: 9 November 1991 (age 34)
- Place of birth: Voorburg, Netherlands
- Positions: Defender; striker

Youth career
- RVC Rijswijk
- ADO Den Haag
- Feyenoord
- 2007–2009: Excelsior
- 2009–2011: Aston Villa

Senior career*
| Years | Team | Apps | (Gls) |
| 2011 | Aston Villa | 0 | (0) |
| 2011 | → Volendam (loan) | 10 | (1) |
| 2011–2012 | HBS Craeyenhout | 10 | (1) |
| 2012 | Emmen | 7 | (0) |
| 2012–2013 | Haaglandia | 24 | (1) |
| 2014–2016 | OFC | 3 | (0) |
| 2016–2017 | DSO | 6 | (1) |
- * Club domestic league appearances and goals as of 00:17, 30 January 2011 (UTC)

Arsenio Amerencio Halfhuid (born 9 November 1991) is a Dutch retired footballer who most recently played for SV DSO in the lower leagues of the Dutch football pyramid and is now a coach. He previously played for various Dutch football academy sides including Feyenoord and ADO Den Haag, as well as the youth team of English side Aston Villa. Halfhuid played either as a central defender or a striker after being used in the latter role by Aston Villa youth team coach Tony McAndrew. Halfhuid is the cousin of former Chelsea and Southampton defender Ken Monkou.

== Career ==
=== Early career ===
==== Aston Villa ====
Halfhuid played for the youth teams of RVC Rijswijk, ADO Den Haag, Feyenoord and Excelsior but moved to England to join Premier League side Aston Villa on 8 January 2009. Despite being signed as a central defender, Halfhuid was called upon to play as an emergency striker for Aston Villa's youth team. He successfully adapted to his new role, scoring nine times in his first season for the youth team. This included a long-range finish against West Bromwich Albion and a hat trick in the FA Youth Cup against Millwall.

=== Return to the Netherlands ===
==== Loan to Volendam ====
On 29 January 2011, Halfhuid returned to the Netherlands to join Volendam on loan until the end of the 2010–11 season. He made his debut in the 1–0 loss to Telstar on 30 January 2011, as a 25th-minute substitute for Nick Tol. However, Halfhuid's debut ended on a sour note as he was sent off in the 63rd minute. Despite this initial setback, Halfhuid was regularly chosen to play in Volendam's defence. He scored the first goal of his professional career in a 3–0 away win at FC Eindhoven on 29 April 2011, a spectacular 89th-minute free-kick from outside the area. Halfhuid's performances in his debut season helped Volendam to a sixth-place finish in the Eerste Divisie, and consequently qualification for the promotion play-offs. Halfhuid returned to Aston Villa at the end of the season, but was released after his contract expired in May 2011.

==== HBS Craeyenhout ====
Halfhuid returned to his homeland and went on trial with FC Oss, but unfortunately could not come to an agreement. He joined Dutch Topklasse side HBS-Craeyenhout for the 2011–12 season. He played at Sunday league level for the amateur club.

==== FC Emmen ====
On 31 January 2012, it was revealed that Halfhuid had agreed to transfer to FC Emmen to continue his professional playing career. The deal was completed the following day on 1 February. Halfhuid played a total of 7 games for FC Emmen before the end of his first season, but could not prevent the club from finishing bottom of the league. He was later released by the club. He went on trial with AGOVV Apeldoorn in July 2012 but later joined Haaglandia.

==== Haaglandia ====
Halfhuid joined VV Haaglandia in summer 2012, a team in the Topklasse, the third division of football in the Netherlands. In November 2013 it was reported that Halfhuid had terminated his contract with Haaglandia.

==== OFC Oostzaan ====
On 1 April 2014, OFC Oostzaan of the Eerste Klasse, the fifth tier of Dutch football, announced the signing of Halfhuid.

==== SV DSO ====
On 16 June 2016, SV DSO announced the signing of Halfhuid. He left SV DSO in 2017 and is now not signed to a club.

=== Personal life ===
Halfhuid now works as a football coach and teacher in the Netherlands. He is an assistant coach at TAC '90.
