= Ben Sampayo =

English footballer

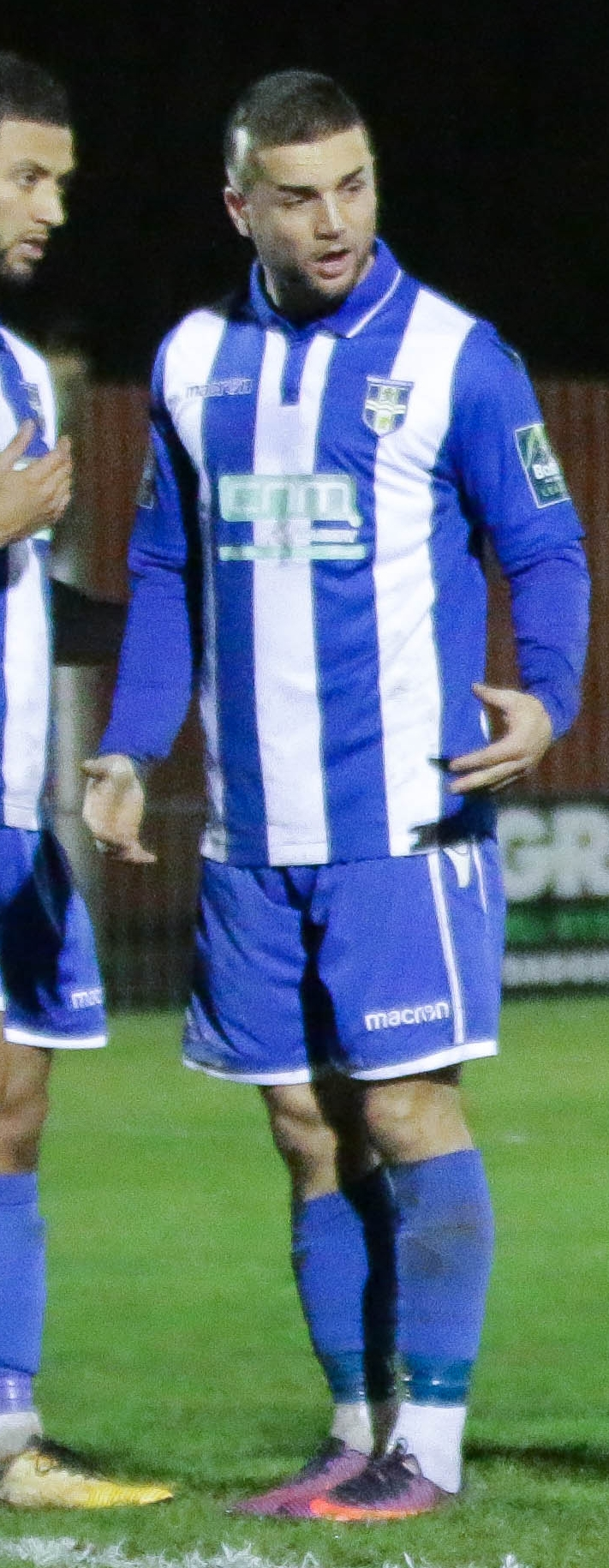
- Sampayo playing for Bishop's Stortford in December 2018

Personal information
- Date of birth: 10 December 1992 (age 33)
- Place of birth: Dagenham, England
- Height: 1.76 m (5 ft 9 1/2 in)
- Position: Defender

Team information
- Current team: Bishop's Stortford

Youth career
- 2006–2011: Chelsea
- 2011–2012: Brighton & Hove Albion

Senior career*
Years	Team	Apps	(Gls)
2012–2013	Brighton & Hove Albion	0	(0)
2013	→ Bishop's Stortford (loan)	9	(0)
2013	Chelmsford City	6	(0)
2014	Greenock Morton	2	(0)
2014	Grays Athletic	0	(0)
2014	Dover Athletic	0	(0)
2015	Hemel Hempstead Town	0	(0)
2016–2017	Brentwood Town	36	(1)
2017	Heybridge Swifts	8	(0)
2017–2018	East Thurrock United	3	(0)
2018	Aveley	18	(0)
2018–	Bishop's Stortford	44	(0)
- * Club domestic league appearances and goals as of 01:16, 23 January 2020 (UTC)

Ben Jordan Sampayo (born 10 December 1992) is an English footballer who plays for Bishop's Stortford.

He came through the youth team at Chelsea, where he won the FA Youth Cup in 2010. He then spent two seasons as a professional at Brighton & Hove Albion, though made only one FA Cup appearance for the club. He spent time on loan at Bishop's Stortford in 2013, before moving on to Chelmsford City and Greenock Morton. He picked up an injury at Morton, and went on to have brief non-playing spells with Grays Athletic, Dover Athletic, and Hemel Hempstead Town.

== Career ==
Sampayo came through the Chelsea Academy, and was an unused substitute in both legs of the club's FA Youth Cup final victory over Aston Villa in 2010. He was released upon the expiry of his contract in June 2011. He was soon signed up to the Brighton & Hove Albion development squad, along with former Chelsea teammate Anton Rodgers. He made his first team debut for the "Seagulls" in a 1–1 draw with Wrexham in an FA Cup third round match at Falmer Stadium on 7 January 2012. On 29 March 2013, he joined Bishop's Stortford of the Conference South on loan until the end of the 2012–13 season. He was released by Brighton in the summer, having played only one game for the club.

He signed with Chelmsford City in August 2013 after impressing manager Dean Holdsworth in a trial game. He made six Conference South appearances for the "Clarets" in the 2013–14 season, before being released in October. He played in a behind-closed-doors friendly for Carlisle United in December 2013; Carlisle manager Graham Kavanagh said that "Ben showed a good attitude, got up and down well and is a nice footballer but we have decided not to take it any further". Sampayo won a professional contract with Scottish Championship side Greenock Morton the following month. He picked up a cruciate ligament injury in a reserve team game at Cappielow Park, and after being released by Morton admitted to feeling "very lonely, really isolated and depressed" as he struggled to prove his fitness to prospective clubs.

In September 2014, Sampayo returned to England and signed for Isthmian League Premier Division club Grays Athletic. Two months later he moved on to Conference Premier side Dover Athletic. In August 2015, he signed for National League South side Hemel Hempstead Town. He never played a league game for Grays, Dover, or Hemel Hempstead. He played a reserve team game with Port Vale in October 2016.

== Career statistics ==
As of match played 10 December 2019

Club	Season	League			National Cup		League Cup		Other		Total	
Club	Season	Division	Apps	Goals	Apps	Goals	Apps	Goals	Apps	Goals	Apps	Goals
Brighton & Hove Albion	2011–12	Championship	0	0	1	0	0	0	—		1	0
Bishop's Stortford (loan)	2012–13	Conference South	9	0	0	0	—		0	0	9	0
Chelmsford City	2013–14	Conference South	6	0	1	0	—		0	0	7	0
Greenock Morton	2013–14	Scottish Championship	2	0	0	0	—		0	0	2	0
Dover Athletic	2014–15	Conference Premier	0	0	0	0	—		1 (Note: Appearance(s) in Kent Senior Cup)	0	1	0
Hemel Hempstead Town	2015–16	National League South	0	0	0	0	—		0	0	0	0
Brentwood Town	2016–17	Isthmian League First Division North	36	1	1	0	—		1 (Note: Appearance(s) in FA Trophy)	0	38	1
Heybridge Swifts	2017–18	Isthmian League First Division North	8	0	8	1	—		6 (Note: 4 appearances in FA Trophy, 2 appearances in Isthmian League Cup)	0	22	1
East Thurrock United	2017–18	National League South	4	0	—		—		—		4	0
Aveley	2017–18	Isthmian League North Division	13	0	—		—		—		13	0
Aveley	2018–19	Isthmian League North Division	5	0	0	0	—		2 (Note: 1 appearance in FA Trophy, 1 appearance in Isthmian League Cup)	0	7	0
Aveley	Total		18	0	0	0	—		2	0	20	0
Bishop's Stortford	2018–19	Isthmian League Premier Division	25	0	—		—		1 (Note: Appearance in Herts Senior Cup)	0	26	0
Bishop's Stortford	2019–20	Isthmian League Premier Division	19	0	2	0	—		4 (Note: 2 appearances in FA Trophy, 1 appearance in Isthmian League Cup, 1 appearance in Herts Senior Cup)	0	25	0
Bishop's Stortford	Bishop's Stortford total		53	0	2	0	—		5	0	60	0
Career total			127	1	13	1	0	0	15	0	155	2

== Honours ==
Chelsea

- FA Youth Cup: 2009–10
