= Aliu Djaló =

Bissau-Guinean footballer (born 1992)

Personal information
- Full name: Aliu Djaló
- Date of birth: 5 February 1992 (age 34)
- Place of birth: Bissau, Guinea-Bissau
- Height: 1.69 m (5 ft 7 in)
- Position: Midfielder

Team information
- Current team: Pedras Rubras

Youth career
- 2003–2007: Boavista
- 2007–2012: Chelsea

Senior career*
Years	Team	Apps	(Gls)
2012	AEL Limassol	4	(0)
2012–2013	Boavista	0	(0)
2013–2014	Marítimo	0	(0)
2014–2015	Gaz Metan Mediaș	3	(0)
2014	→ Pogoń Siedlce (loan)	12	(0)
2014	→ Pogoń Siedlce II (loan)	2	(2)
2015	→ PS Kemi (loan)	25	(3)
2015–2016	PS Kemi	17	(1)
2016–2019	Crawley Town	30	(1)
2019	Njarðvík	12	(0)
2020–2021	Víðir	27	(1)
2022	Hvöt	17	(3)
2023	Coimbrões		
2023	Infesta		
2023–	Pedras Rubras		

International career
2006	Portugal U16	2	(2)
2007–2008	Portugal U17	3	(0)
2007	Portugal U18	8	(0)
2011	Portugal U20	2	(0)
2016	Guinea-Bissau	1	(0)
- * Club domestic league appearances and goals as of 11:51, 5 February 2024 (UTC)

Aliu Djaló (born 5 February 1992) is a Bissau-Guinean professional footballer who plays as a midfielder for Portuguese cub Pedras Rubras. Beside Aliu Djaló, he is also widely known as Kaby Djaló, or even simply Kaby. He has represented the Guinea-Bissau national team but also has Portuguese citizenship.

== Club career ==
Born in Bissau, Guinea-Bissau, he spent his early career in Portugal, playing in the youth teams of Boavista since 2003. In 2007, he moved to England to join Premier League side Chelsea where he played in their youth team until 2011. Afterwards, he was promoted to the Chelsea reserve squad in the first half of the 2011–12 season.

During the winter break of the 2011–12 season, he moved to Cyprus and made his debut as a senior while playing with AEL Limassol in the Cypriot First Division contributing for AEL's championship winning squad.

On 13 August 2012, Djaló arrived in Serbia and spent a period on trial at Red Star Belgrade.

In December 2012 Djaló spent a period on trial with League One side Yeovil Town but failed to earn a contract.

On 18 July 2013, Djaló signed with Marítimo.

On 31 August 2016, Djaló returned to England after spells in Romania, Poland and Finland to join League Two side Crawley Town on a two-year deal. On 17 September 2016, Djaló made his Crawley debut in a 2–0 home victory against Luton Town, featuring for the entire 90 minutes. On 15 October 2016, Djaló scored his first goal for Crawley in their 2–1 away defeat against Cheltenham Town, netting in the 78th minute. On 14 May 2019, it was announced that Djaló would leave Crawley at the end of his current deal in June.

In July 2019, Djaló joined Icelandic club Njarðvík and the following year he remained in the country to play for Víðir.

== International career ==
Despite being born in Guinea-Bissau, Djaló has represented Portugal at U-17 and U-18 levels. Djaló was called up to the Guinea-Bissau national football team and made his debut in a 2017 Africa Cup of Nations qualification match 3–2 win over Zambia.

== Career statistics ==
As of match played 26 December 2017.

Appearances and goals by club, season and competition
Club	Season	League			National Cup		League Cup		Other		Total	
Club	Season	Division	Apps	Goals	Apps	Goals	Apps	Goals	Apps	Goals	Apps	Goals
AEL Limassol	2011–12	Cypriot First Division	4	0	0	0	—		—		4	0
Gaz Metan Mediaș	2013–14	Liga I	3	0	0	0	0	0	—		3	0
Pogoń Siedlce (loan)	2014–15	I liga	12	0	0	0	—		—		12	0
PS Kemi (loan)	2015	Ykkönen	23	3	1	0	—		—		24	3
PS Kemi	2016	Veikkausliiga	17	1	0	0	4	0	—		21	1
Crawley Town	2016–17	League Two	28	1	2	0	0	0	3 (Note: Appearance(s) in EFL Trophy)	0	33	1
Crawley Town	2017–18	League Two	15	0	0	0	1	0	3	0	19	0
Crawley Town	Total		30	1	2	0	1	0	6	0	39	1
Career total			89	5	3	0	5	0	6	0	103	5

== Honours ==
AEL Limasol

- Cypriot First Division: 2011–12

PS Kemi

- Ykkönen: 2015
