= 2009–10 Premier Academy League =

- Champions: Arsenal U18s
- Matches: 563 (560 RS, 3 PO)
- Goals: (RS, PO)

The 2009–10 Premier Academy League Under–18 season is the thirteenth edition since the establishment of The Premier Academy League, and the sixth under the current make-up.

All teams played the other teams in their group twice and play 10 inter-group fixtures, producing 28 games a season. Eight of the inter-group games were played against teams in their 'paired group' (i.e. A–B and C–D are the paired groups), whilst the remaining two games comprise one game against a team in each of the two remaining groups. Winners of each group qualify for play-offs.

Arsenal U18s defeated Nottingham Forest U18s 5–3 in the play-off final at the Emirates Stadium and won the title for the second season in a row.

== League tables ==
=== Academy Group A ===
Pos	Team	Pld	W	D	L	GD	Pts
1	Arsenal U18s (Q) (C)	28	17	5	6	31	56
2	Crystal Palace U18s	28	13	8	7	18	47
3	Chelsea U18s	28	14	5	9	8	47
4	Norwich City U18s	28	11	6	11	-7	39
5	West Ham United U18s	28	10	8	10	8	38
6	Fulham U18s	28	12	2	14	0	38
7	Southampton U18s	28	10	5	13	-13	35
8	Charlton Athletic U18s	28	10	4	14	-17	34
9	Ipswich Town U18s	28	8	9	11	-9	33
10	Portsmouth U18s	28	4	3	21	-37	15

Reference - final table at arsenal.com

=== Academy Group B ===
Pos	Team	Pld	W	D	L	GD	Pts
1	Leicester City U18s (Q)	28	22	6	0	48	72
2	Tottenham Hotspur U18s	28	19	2	7	49	59
3	Aston Villa U18s	28	16	5	7	40	53
4	Reading U18s	28	11	7	10	2	40
5	Birmingham City U18s	28	11	5	12	-15	38
6	Watford U18s	28	10	4	14	-5	34
7	Cardiff City U18s	28	10	4	14	-9	34
8	Bristol City U18s	28	9	5	14	-20	32
9	Coventry City U18s	28	7	9	12	-10	30
10	Milton Keynes Dons U18s	28	2	7	19	-57	13

Reference - table minus one fixture at official site, Tottenham results for final fixture

=== Academy Group C ===
Pos	Team	Pld	W	D	L	GD	Pts
1	Manchester United U18s (Q)	28	16	7	5	27	55
2	Everton U18s	28	15	5	8	21	50
3	West Bromwich Albion U18s	28	12	9	7	21	45
4	Liverpool U18s	28	14	3	11	4	45
5	Wolverhampton Wanderers U18s	28	13	5	10	1	44
6	Manchester City U18s	28	12	6	10	19	42
7	Blackburn Rovers U18s	28	11	9	8	-2	42
8	Stoke City U18s	28	9	10	9	-6	37
9	Crewe Alexandra U18s	28	10	6	12	-9	36
10	Bolton Wanderers U18s	28	5	8	15	-21	23

Reference - table minus one fixture at official site, Wolves results for final fixture

=== Academy Group D ===
Pos	Team	Pld	W	D	L	GD	Pts
1	Nottingham Forest U18s (Q)	28	18	5	5	27	59
2	Sunderland U18s	28	17	4	7	37	55
3	Newcastle United U18s	28	14	7	7	17	49
4	Middlesbrough U18s	28	9	9	10	-7	36
5	Leeds United U18s	28	10	5	13	-15	35
6	Barnsley U18s	28	8	5	15	-21	29
7	Derby County U18s	28	7	6	15	-21	27
8	Sheffield United U18s	28	5	11	12	-16	26
9	Huddersfield Town U18s	28	4	7	17	-28	19
10	Sheffield Wednesday U18s	28	3	8	17	-33	17

Reference - official table

Rules for classification: 1st points; 2nd goal difference; 3rd goals scored
Pos = Position; Pld = Matches played; W = Matches won; D = Matches drawn; L = Matches lost; GD = Goal difference; Pts = Points
Q = Qualified for playoffs; C = Champions

== Play-off semi-finals ==
7 May 2010
11:00am

Manchester United U18s	1–1 (a.e.t.)	Arsenal U18s
John Cofie 111'		Oğuzhan Özyakup 100'
Penalties
Joshua King (penalty scored); Ryan Tunnicliffe (penalty missed); Scott Wootton (penalty scored); Paul Pogba (penalty scored)	3 – 5	(penalty scored) Oğuzhan Özyakup; (penalty scored) Cedric Evina; (penalty scored) Luke Freeman; (penalty scored) Benik Afobe; (penalty scored) Emmanuel Frimpong

Trafford Training Centre, Carrington
Referee: C Kavanagh

8 May 2010
3:00pm

Leicester City U18s	1–1 (a.e.t.)	Nottingham Forest U18s
Penalties
	1 – 2

Leicester City training ground

== Play-off Final ==
11 May 2010
2:00pm

Arsenal U18s	5 – 3	Nottingham Forest U18s
Benik Afobe 31', 41', 65' (pen.); Luke Freeman 72' (pen.), 81'	Report	Danny Elliot 5'; Thomson 61'; Tom Mullen 73'

Emirates Stadium
Referee: C J Knowles

Match reports can be found at each club's official website:
Group A	Group B	Group C	Group D
Arsenal; Charlton Athletic; Chelsea; Crystal Palace; Fulham; Ipswich Town; Norwich City; Portsmouth; Southampton; West Ham United	Aston Villa; Birmingham City; Bristol City; Cardiff City; Coventry City; Leicester City; Milton Keynes Dons; Reading; Tottenham Hotspur; Watford	Blackburn Rovers; Bolton Wanderers; Crewe Alexandra; Everton; Liverpool; Manchester City; Manchester United; Stoke City; West Bromwich Albion; Wolverhampton Wanderers	Barnsley; Derby County; Huddersfield Town; Leeds United; Middlesbrough; Newcastle United; Nottingham Forest; Sheffield United; Sheffield Wednesday; Sunderland
