= 2008–09 Chelsea F.C. season =

English football club season

Chelsea F.C.
2008–09 season
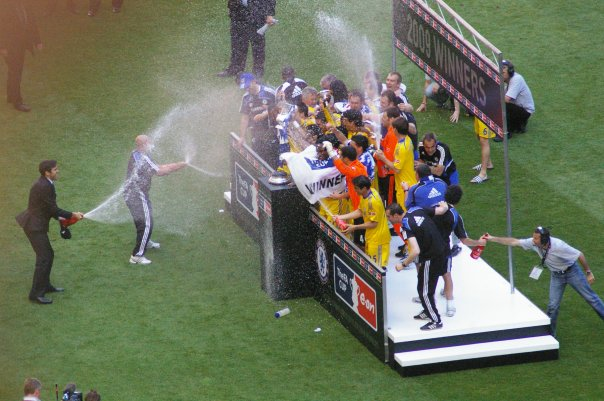
- Chelsea players celebrating FA Cup title
- Owner: Roman Abramovich
- Chairman: Bruce Buck
- Manager: Luiz Felipe Scolari (until 9 February 2009); Ray Wilkins (caretaker manager); Guus Hiddink (interim manager)
- Stadium: Stamford Bridge
- Premier League: 3rd
- FA Cup: Winners
- League Cup: Fourth round
- UEFA Champions League: Semi-finals
- Top goalscorer: League: Nicolas Anelka (19); All: Nicolas Anelka (25)
- Highest home attendance: 41,810 v Manchester City (15 March 2009)
- Lowest home attendance: 37,857 v Barcelona (6 May 2009)
Home colours	Away colours	Third colours

The 2008–09 season was Chelsea Football Club's 95th competitive season, 17th consecutive season in the Premier League and 103rd year in existence as a football club.

== Kits ==
Supplier: Adidas / Sponsor: Samsung

Home	Home alt.	2009–10	Away	Third

Goalkeeper 1	Goalkeeper alt.	Goalkeeper alt. 2	Goalkeeper 2	Goalkeeper 3

== Season summary ==
After again finishing second to Manchester United in the Premier League the previous season, Chelsea sacked their manager Avram Grant, replacing him with the Brazilian Luiz Felipe Scolari, who had managed the Portugal national team at UEFA Euro 2008 that lost in the quarter finals to Germany. The first few months of his management went according to plan, as Scolari's narrow 4–1–4–1 formation, using Ashley Cole and new arrival José Bosingwa as wing-backs, initially took the league by storm, leaving Chelsea top ahead of Liverpool after 13 games.

By the end of November, however, Scolari's Chelsea began to lose their form due to exhaustion. They suffered a 3–1 defeat away to Roma in the Champions League and were eliminated from the League Cup at Stamford Bridge by Championship side Burnley on penalties. In the league, they had a 0–0 draw at home to Newcastle United, (who were later to be relegated). Chelsea lost a home league game for the first time since 2004 (and 86 matches) when they lost to Liverpool, and a second home league defeat to rivals Arsenal dropped Chelsea to second place.

Chelsea qualified for the knock-out stages of the Champions League with a 2–1 victory against Romanian champions CFR Cluj at Stamford Bridge in the final match of the group. During the winter months, they drew against West Ham United, Fulham, Hull City and League One's Southend United in the FA Cup. Chelsea suffered defeats away to Manchester United and Liverpool, which left them in fourth place during February which would mean a Champions League place would not be certain. Long-term injuries to Michael Essien and Joe Cole marked the period while Didier Drogba was not included frequently.

Chelsea sacked Scolari, replacing him with Russia national team manager Guus Hiddink for the remainder of the season. Hiddink's regenerative effect was immediate, with four-straight league wins, including a vital 1–0 victory away to Aston Villa in his first game in charge, moving Chelsea into the top three. Eleven wins in the team's last 13 league games, marked by a 4–1 victory over Arsenal away at the Emirates Stadium, finally secured third place in the league, and Champions League football for a seventh consecutive season.

Although Chelsea's title challenge was already realistically over when he arrived, Hiddink led Chelsea to their fifth Champions League semi-final, knocking out Juventus and Liverpool, where they were eliminated in controversial circumstances by Barcelona on away goals in the semi-final.

Despite the Champions League exit, the season culminated in a trip to Wembley Stadium, with Chelsea's final game of 2008–09 contested against Everton in the 2009 FA Cup Final. Chelsea won 2–1, winning the FA Cup for the fifth time in their history.

== Key dates ==
- 24.05.08 – Avram Grant is sacked as Chelsea manager.
- 29.05.08 – Chelsea terminate assistant manager Henk ten Cate's contract.
- 11.06.08 – Chelsea name Luiz Felipe Scolari as new manager, with his contract officially starting on 1 July 2008.
- 03.08.08 – Chelsea thrash Milan 5–0 to take third place in the preseason Russian Railways Cup.
- 17.08.08 – Chelsea start their 2008–09 Premier League campaign with an emphatic 4–0 home victory over Portsmouth.
- 15.09.08 – Assistant manager Steve Clarke leaves Chelsea to become number two under Gianfranco Zola at West Ham United.
- 16.09.08 – Chelsea defeat Bordeaux 4–0 at Stamford Bridge in the opening match of the UEFA Champions League.
- 18.09.08 – Ray Wilkins is appointed assistant manager of Chelsea, in place of the departed Steve Clarke.
- 21.09.08 – Exactly four months after the 2008 Champions League final, Chelsea draw 1–1 at home against Manchester United in the Premier League.
- 24.09.08 – For the third time in a row, Chelsea start a competition with a 4–0 win, beating Portsmouth 4–0 away at Fratton Park in the League Cup.
- 26.10.08 – Chelsea lose 1–0 against Liverpool at Stamford Bridge in the Premier League. Chelsea's home unbeaten run ends after an astonishing 4 years, 8 months and 86 games.
- 12.11.08 – Chelsea lose 5–4 on penalties after a 1–1 draw in extra time against Burnley at home in the fourth round of the League Cup.
- 30.11.08 – Chelsea lose 2–1 against Arsenal at home in the Premier League after a Robin van Persie brace. Replays later show the Dutchman's first goal to be offside.
- 09.12.08 – Chelsea fight back to win 2–1 against CFR Cluj in the UEFA Champions League at home. With the win, they secure second place in Group A and advance to the First knockout round.
- 03.01.09 – Chelsea draw 1–1 against Football League One side Southend United in the third round of the FA Cup at Stamford Bridge.
- 11.01.09 – Chelsea lose 3–0 against Manchester United in the Premier League at Old Trafford, their first away loss in the Premier League this season.
- 17.01.09 – Chelsea snatch a crucial 2–1 home victory against Stoke City in the Premier League after two last minute goals from Juliano Belletti and Frank Lampard. Lampard also makes his 400th appearance for Chelsea.
- 01.02.09 – Chelsea lose 2–0 against Liverpool at Anfield in the Premier League by way of two late Fernando Torres goals after Frank Lampard is incorrectly sent off in the 60th minute.
- 09.02.09 – Due to the team's poor run of form, endangering Chelsea's hopes of Champions League qualification for the following season, the Chelsea board dismiss Luiz Felipe Scolari from his position as manager with immediate effect. Ray Wilkins is named as caretaker manager while a suitable replacement for Scolari is found.
- 11.02.09 – Russian national manager Guus Hiddink is named as temporary Chelsea manager until the end of the season.
- 14.02.09 – With Ray Wilkins in charge as caretaker manager, a Nicolas Anelka hat trick against Watford at Vicarage Road gives Chelsea a 3–1 victory and a place in the FA Cup quarter-finals against Coventry City. Michael Essien makes his return from the bench after six months out of action due to an ACL injury.
- 21.02.09 – In Guus Hiddink's first match as manager, a Nicolas Anelka goal and a gritty Chelsea performance bring about a vital 1–0 win against Aston Villa at Villa Park, Chelsea's first Premier League victory there since 1998–99. With it, Chelsea overtake Villa to reclaim third place in the table.
- 25.02.09 – Chelsea end the first leg of their Champions League first knockout round tie against Juventus with a slight advantage, winning the first ever competitive meeting between the clubs 1–0 by a Didier Drogba goal. The match also marks Petr Čech's 200th appearance for Chelsea.
- 28.02.09 – A John Terry volley and a late Frank Lampard header seal a 2–1 victory for Chelsea over Wigan Athletic in the Premier League. While Liverpool's 2–0 loss to Middlesbrough at the Riverside returns Chelsea to second place, Michael Mancienne makes his first ever Premier League start at right back, John Terry's goal makes him the highest scoring defender in Chelsea history, and Frank Lampard joins George Mills as Chelsea's joint sixth all-time scorer with 125 goals.
- 10.03.09 – A tempestuous 2–2 second leg draw at the Stadio Olimpico di Torino against Juventus, with goals scored by Michael Essien in his first start since September and a reborn Didier Drogba, gives Chelsea a 3–2 victory on aggregate in their Champions League first knockout round clash, sending them through to the quarter-finals of the competition.
- 08.04.09 – Chelsea claim a commanding 3–1 win in the first leg of their Champions League quarter-final tie with Liverpool at Anfield, recovering from an early Fernando Torres goal to score twice from the head of Branislav Ivanović, with a reborn Didier Drogba capping off the scoring. Liverpool captain Steven Gerrard is notably marked out of the game by Michael Essien.
- 11.04.09 – Chelsea take a 4–0 lead after 63 minutes against Bolton Wanderers at Stamford Bridge in the Premier League, scoring through Michael Ballack, a double from Didier Drogba and a penalty from Frank Lampard, for Bolton to surprisingly surge back into the game, scoring three goals in an eight-minute span. Although Bolton come close to equalising in injury-time, Chelsea just manage to hold off their comeback to scrape a 4–3 victory.
- 14.04.09 – The second leg of Chelsea's Champions League quarter-final match with Liverpool ends in a stunning 4–4 draw. After a clever Fábio Aurélio free-kick and a Xabi Alonso penalty give Liverpool a 0–2 lead in the first 30 minutes, Chelsea fight back in the second half to make the score 3–2 with goals from Didier Drogba and Frank Lampard sandwiching a trademark Alex cannonball free-kick. Two more goals from Lucas and Dirk Kuyt give Liverpool renewed hope in progression, but a second Lampard strike puts the tie to bed. The tie ends 7–5 to Chelsea on aggregate, leaving them to play a rampant Barcelona in the semi-finals, Chelsea's fifth attendance at this stage in six seasons. Ashley Cole's yellow card in this game rules him out of the first leg of that tie, leaving Chelsea without a recognised left back to field at the Camp Nou.
- 18.04.09 – A mistake by goalkeeper Łukasz Fabiański gifts Didier Drogba an 84th-minute winner in Chelsea's FA Cup semi-final clash against Arsenal at Wembley Stadium, sending Chelsea to a tense 2–1 victory after a goal by Florent Malouda equalises Theo Walcott's early strike. Chelsea consequently reach their ninth FA Cup final, to be contested against Everton on 30 May.
- 25.04.09 – Petr Čech's save from Mark Noble's penalty secures Chelsea a 1–0 Premier League victory over West Ham United at Upton Park after Salomon Kalou scores his ninth goal of the season before giving away a spot-kick at the other end. Michael Mancienne starts his second Premier League game of the season, while José Bosingwa makes an experimental appearance at left back in preparation for Chelsea's visit to the Camp Nou.
- 28.4.09 – A masterful defensive display by Chelsea sees them become the first team not to concede a goal at the Camp Nou this season in an intriguing 0–0 draw with Barcelona, the first leg of the clubs' Champions League semi-final tie. Petr Čech shrugs off his recent media criticism with a string of important saves and despite Barcelona's domination on possession, Didier Drogba has an excellent chance to secure an away goal for Chelsea, only to be stopped by a double save from Víctor Valdés at the end of the first half.
- 02.5.09 – John Terry's 400th game for Chelsea, a West London derby at Stamford Bridge against Fulham in the Premier League, ends in a 3–1 victory to the home side following goals from Gallic trio Nicolas Anelka, Florent Malouda, and Didier Drogba. The asymmetric 4–3–3 formation used by Chelsea in this game, with Anelka playing more like a second striker, was Guus Hiddink's preference for the remainder of the season.
- 06.5.09 – A controversial 1–1 draw in the second leg of Chelsea's Champions League semi-final tie against Barcelona at Stamford Bridge eliminates Chelsea from the competition on the away goals rule, sending Barcelona to the final to play Manchester United in Rome. Essien's brilliant left footed volley early in the game gives Chelsea the lead, but unclinical finishing and four viable penalty appeals turned down by Norwegian referee Tom Henning Øvrebø allow Barcelona to equalise in the ninety-third minute with their only shot on target all game, a strike from outside the penalty area by Andrés Iniesta, despite the earlier sending off of Eric Abidal. Incensed by the referee's terrible performance, Chelsea players surround and criticise Øvrebø after the final whistle, with Didier Drogba controversially labelling the result "a fucking disgrace" on live international television.
- 10.5.09 – Chelsea shake off their post-Barcelona blues with an emphatic 4–1 victory against Arsenal at the Emirates Stadium in the Premier League. After surviving an early bout of Arsenal pressure, Chelsea take a 3–0 lead through an Alex header, a long range shot from Nicolas Anelka against his former club, and a Kolo Touré own goal. Nicklas Bendtner pulls one back for the home side, but a tap in from Florent Malouda completes the rout. The result ends the Gunners' 21 game unbeaten run in the league, and is the joint best away result against Arsenal in the league in Chelsea's history. Chelsea will finish the league season in at least third place, securing automatic Champions League qualification for 2009–10.
- 17.05.09 – Chelsea's last home game of the season against Blackburn Rovers in the Premier League at Stamford Bridge ends in a 2–0 victory, with goals scored by Florent Malouda and Nicolas Anelka. The game is marked by an end-of-season party atmosphere as fans chant repeatedly for Guus Hiddink to remain at the club, criticising the club's apparent pursuit of Milan manager Carlo Ancelotti to replace Hiddink over the summer.
- 24.05.09 – The last game of Chelsea's 2008–09 season ends in a 3–2 victory against Sunderland away at the Stadium of Light. In preparation for the FA Cup final against Everton the following Sunday, Frank Lampard and Alex are rested, and Sunderland's still uncertain survival in the Premier League leads to a tense first half. Nicolas Anelka's long-range curler early in the second half, his 19th league goal of the season, secures him the Premier League Golden Boot ahead of Cristiano Ronaldo. Salomon Kalou replies to Kieran Richardson's equaliser, and, despite Kenwyne Jones' late header, Ashley Cole's first goal of the season wins the game for Chelsea.
- 30.05.09 – Chelsea win the 2009 FA Cup Final with a 2–1 victory over Merseysiders Everton, who were chasing their first FA Cup since their victory over Manchester United in 1995. A Louis Saha goal after 25 seconds becomes the fastest in FA Cup history, but Chelsea quickly recover with a Florent Malouda cross finding the head of Didier Drogba. Chelsea continue to dominate before finally taking the lead in the 70th minute, after Frank Lampard escapes his marker Phil Neville for the first time in the game and unleashes a shot from 25 yards. A Malouda shot from 40 yards is incorrectly judged not to have crossed the line after rebounding from the crossbar, but Chelsea hold on for a famous victory. Guus Hiddink ends his short tenure as Chelsea manager with silverware.

== Squad ==
=== First-team squad ===
Note: Flags indicate national team as defined under FIFA eligibility rules; some limited exceptions apply. Players may hold more than one non-FIFA nationality.

No.	Pos.	Nation	Player
1	GK	CZE	Petr Čech
2	DF	SRB	Branislav Ivanović
3	DF	ENG	Ashley Cole
5	MF	GHA	Michael Essien
6	DF	POR	Ricardo Carvalho
8	MF	ENG	Frank Lampard (vice-captain)
9	FW	ARG	Franco Di Santo
10	FW	ENG	Joe Cole
11	FW	CIV	Didier Drogba
12	MF	NGR	Mikel John Obi
13	MF	GER	Michael Ballack
15	MF	FRA	Florent Malouda
17	DF	POR	José Bosingwa
18	MF	POR	Ricardo Quaresma (on loan from Inter Milan)

No.	Pos.	Nation	Player
19	DF	POR	Paulo Ferreira
20	MF	POR	Deco
21	FW	CIV	Salomon Kalou
26	DF	ENG	John Terry (captain)
27	MF	BRA	Mineiro
30	GK	WAL	Rhys Taylor
33	DF	BRA	Alex
35	DF	BRA	Juliano Belletti
39	FW	FRA	Nicolas Anelka
40	GK	POR	Hilário
42	DF	ENG	Michael Mancienne
43	FW	SVK	Miroslav Stoch
50	MF	ENG	Jacob Mellis

=== Reserve squad ===
Note: Flags indicate national team as defined under FIFA eligibility rules; some limited exceptions apply. Players may hold more than one non-FIFA nationality.

No.	Pos.	Nation	Player
—	GK	WAL	Rhys Taylor
—	DF	ENG	Nana Ofori-Twumasi
—	DF	ENG	Sam Hutchinson
—	DF	ENG	Carl Magnay (On loan at Northampton Town)
—	DF	NED	Jeffrey Bruma
—	DF	ENG	Michael Mancienne
—	DF	ENG	Ryan Bertrand (On loan at Norwich City)
—	DF	NED	Patrick van Aanholt
—	MF	ENG	Jack Cork (On loan at Watford)
—	MF	ENG	Liam Bridcutt
—	MF	POR	Ricardo Fernandes
—	MF	ENG	Lee Sawyer (On loan at Wycombe Wanderers)

No.	Pos.	Nation	Player
—	MF	ENG	Tom Taiwo
—	MF	ENG	Jacob Mellis
—	MF	ENG	Michael Woods
—	MF	ESP	Sergio Tejera (On loan at Real Mallorca)
—	FW	FRA	Gaël Kakuta
—	FW	POR	Fábio Ferreira (On loan at Oldham Athletic)
—	FW	SVK	Miroslav Stoch
—	FW	ENG	Shaun Cummings (On loan at MK Dons)
—	FW	ISR	Ben Sahar (On loan at De Graafschap)
—	FW	DEN	Morten Nielsen
—	FW	ENG	Jimmy Smith (On loan at Leyton Orient)

=== Youth squad ===
Note: Flags indicate national team as defined under FIFA eligibility rules; some limited exceptions apply. Players may hold more than one non-FIFA nationality.

No.	Pos.	Nation	Player
—	GK	GER	Niclas Heimann
—	GK	KOS	Aldi Haxhia
—	GK	ENG	Sam Walker
—	GK	CZE	Jan Šebek
—	DF	SRI	Nikki Ahamed
—	DF	ENG	Tom Hayden
—	DF	ENG	Jack Saville
—	DF	ENG	Ben Gordon
—	DF	ENG	Billy Joe-King
—	MF	POR	Aliu Djaló

No.	Pos.	Nation	Player
—	MF	IRL	Conor Clifford
—	MF	TUR	Gökhan Töre
—	MF	ENG	Danny Philliskirk
—	MF	ITA	Jacopo Sala
—	MF	ENG	Jordan Tabor
—	FW	ITA	Fabio Borini
—	FW	SWE	Marko Mitrović
—	FW	ENG	Adam Phillip
—	FW	ENG	Frank Nouble
—	FW	SOM	Abdoul Rahmar

=== UEFA Champions League squad ===
Note: Flags indicate national team as defined under FIFA eligibility rules; some limited exceptions apply. Players may hold more than one non-FIFA nationality.

No.	Pos.	Nation	Player
1	GK	CZE	Petr Čech
2	DF	SRB	Branislav Ivanović
3	DF	ENG	Ashley Cole
5	MF	GHA	Michael Essien
6	DF	POR	Ricardo Carvalho
8	MF	ENG	Frank Lampard (vice-captain)
9	FW	ARG	Franco Di Santo
10	MF	ENG	Joe Cole
11	FW	CIV	Didier Drogba
12	MF	NGR	Mikel John Obi (from List B)
13	MF	GER	Michael Ballack
15	MF	FRA	Florent Malouda
17	DF	POR	José Bosingwa

No.	Pos.	Nation	Player
19	DF	POR	Paulo Ferreira
20	MF	POR	Deco
21	FW	CIV	Salomon Kalou
26	DF	ENG	John Terry (captain)
27	MF	BRA	Mineiro
30	GK	WAL	Rhys Taylor (from List B)
33	DF	BRA	Alex
35	DF	BRA	Juliano Belletti
39	FW	FRA	Nicolas Anelka
40	GK	POR	Hilário
41	DF	ENG	Sam Hutchinson (from List B)
42	DF	ENG	Michael Mancienne (from List B)
43	FW	SVK	Miroslav Stoch (from List B)

== Club ==
=== Coaching staff ===
Position	Staff
Manager	(Brazil) Luiz Felipe Scolari (until 9 February 2009)
Manager	(England) Ray Wilkins (caretaker manager)
Manager	(Netherlands) Guus Hiddink (interim manager)
Assistant managers	(Brazil) Flávio Murtosa (until 9 February 2009)
Assistant managers	(Scotland) Steve Clarke (until 15 September 2008)
Assistant managers	(England) Ray Wilkins
First team fitness coach	(Brazil) Darlan Schneider (until 9 February 2009)
First team fitness coach	(England) Glen Driscoll
Goalkeeping coach	(France) Christophe Lollichon
Goalkeeping coach	(Brazil) Carlos Pracidelli (until 9 February 2009)
Head scout	(Nigeria) Michael Emenalo
Match observer scout	(England) Mick McGiven
Club doctor	(England) Dr. Bryan English
Chief scout and director of youth development	(Denmark) Frank Arnesen
Reserve team manager	(Northern Ireland) Brendan Rodgers (until December 2008)
Reserve team manager	(England) Paul Clement
Youth team manager	(England) Paul Clement (until December 2008)
Youth team manager	(England) Dermot Drummy
Academy manager	(England) Neil Bath
Match analyst	(England) James Melbourne

Source: Chelsea FC

=== Other information ===
Owner	(Russia) Roman Abramovich
Chairman	(United States) Bruce Buck
Chief Executive	(England) Peter Kenyon
Ground (capacity and dimensions)	Stamford Bridge (41,841 / 103x67 metres)

Source: Chelsea FC

== Transfers ==
=== In ===
==== Summer ====
#	Pos	Player	From	Fee	Date
17	DF	(Portugal) José Bosingwa	(Portugal) Porto	£16.2 million	12 May 2008
20	MF	(Portugal) Deco	(Spain) Barcelona	£7.9 million	30 June 2008
	FW	(Portugal) Fábio Paím	(Portugal) Sporting CP	Loan	21 August 2008
27	MF	(Brazil) Mineiro	(Germany) Hertha BSC	Free	24 September 2008

==== Winter ====
#	Pos	Player	From	Fee	Date
	MF	(Turkey) Gökhan Töre	(Germany) Bayer Leverkusen	£500,000	30 January 2009
18	MF	(Portugal) Ricardo Quaresma	(Italy) Inter Milan	Loan	2 February 2009

=== Out ===
==== Summer ====
#	Pos	Player	To	Fee	Date
	MF	(Denmark) Per Weihrauch	N/A	Retired	April 2008
	FW	(Philippines) Phil Younghusband	Unattached	Released	Summer 2008
	FW	(The Gambia) Momoudou Ceesay	(Belgium) Westerlo	Free	Summer 2008
	MF	(England) James Simmonds	Unattatched	Released	Summer 2008
	DF	(England) Harry Worley	(England) Leicester City	Free	8 May 2008
	DF	(England) Adrian Pettigrew	Unattached	Released	31 May 2008
	FW	(Argentina) Hernán Crespo	(Italy) Inter Milan	Free	3 July 2008
9	MF	(England) Steve Sidwell	(England) Aston Villa	£5.0 million	10 July 2008
4	MF	(France) Claude Makélélé	(France) Paris Saint-Germain	Free	21 July 2008
	DF	(Netherlands) Khalid Boulahrouz	(Germany) VfB Stuttgart	£3.9 million	21 July 2008
22	DF	(Israel) Tal Ben Haim	(England) Manchester City	£5.0 million	30 July 2008
31	MF	(England) Anthony Grant	(England) Southend United	Free	7 August 2008
24	MF	(England) Shaun Wright-Phillips	(England) Manchester City	£9.0 million	28 August 2008

==== Winter ====
#	Pos	Player	To	Fee	Date
18	DF	(England) Wayne Bridge	(England) Manchester City	£12.0 million	3 January 2009
	GK	(England) Stuart Searle	(England) Watford	Free	23 January 2009
23	GK	(Italy) Carlo Cudicini	(England) Tottenham Hotspur	Free	26 January 2009

=== Loaned out ===
#	Pos	Player	To	Start	End
	FW	(Israel) Ben Sahar	(England) Portsmouth	1 July 2008	1 January 2009
	MF	(England) Jimmy Smith	(England) Sheffield Wednesday	2 July 2008	1 January 2009
	DF	(England) Ryan Bertrand	(England) Norwich City	5 July 2008	31 May 2009
	DF	(Serbia) Slobodan Rajković	(Netherlands) Twente	9 July 2008	1 July 2009
	FW	(England) Shaun Cummings	(England) Milton Keynes Dons	4 August 2008	3 May 2009
14	FW	(Peru) Claudio Pizarro	(Germany) Werder Bremen	15 August 2008	30 June 2009
	MF	(England) Lee Sawyer	(England) Southend United	18 August 2008	18 November 2008
	DF	(England) Jack Cork	(England) Southampton	21 August 2008	1 November 2008
7	FW	(Ukraine) Andriy Shevchenko	(Italy) Milan	25 August 2008	1 July 2009
42	DF	(England) Michael Mancienne	(England) Wolverhampton Wanderers	27 October 2008	29 December 2008
	MF	(England) Liam Bridcutt	(England) Watford	27 November 2008	31 January 2009
	DF	(England) Jack Cork	(England) Watford	2 January 2009	1 July 2009
	FW	(Israel) Ben Sahar	(Netherlands) De Graafschap	3 January 2009	1 July 2009
16	MF	(England) Scott Sinclair	(England) Birmingham City	6 January 2009	3 February 2009
	MF	(England) Lee Sawyer	(England) Coventry City	26 January 2009	22 February 2009
	DF	(Northern Ireland) Carl Magnay	(England) Milton Keynes Dons	30 January 2009	30 February 2009
	MF	(England) Jimmy Smith	(England) Leyton Orient	1 February 2009	1 July 2009
	MF	(Spain) Sergio Tejera	(Spain) Mallorca	2 February 2009	1 July 2009
	FW	(Portugal) Fábio Ferreira	(England) Oldham Athletic	20 February 2009	20 March 2009
	DF	(Northern Ireland) Carl Magnay	(England) Northampton Town	9 March 2009	9 April 2009
	MF	(England) Lee Sawyer	(England) Wycombe Wanderers	19 March 2009	1 July 2009

=== Overall ===
==== Spending ====
Summer: ▼24,100,000 £

Winter: ▼0,500,000 £

Total: ▼24,600,000 £

==== Income ====
Summer: ▲22,900,000 £

Winter: ▲12,000,000 £

Total: ▲34,900,000 £

==== Expenditure ====
Summer: ▼1,200,000 £

Winter: ▲11,500,000 £

Total: ▲10,300,000 £

== Pre-season ==
23 July 2008	Guangzhou Pharmaceutical (China)	0–4	(England) Chelsea	Guangdong Olympic Stadium, Guangzhou
13:00		(Report)	Kalou 20'; Lampard 51'; Di Santo 79'; Wright-Phillips 87'	Referee: (China) Zhao Liang

26 July 2008	Chengdu Blades (China)	0–7	(England) Chelsea	Estádio Campo Desportivo, Macau
13:00		(Report)	Anelka 15'; Kalou 31'; Lampard 38'; J. Cole 59', 82'; Di Santo 65'; Wright-Phillips 84'	Referee: (Macau) Tou Lap Meng

29 July 2008	Malaysian Select XI (Malaysia)	0–2	(England) Chelsea	Shah Alam Stadium, Selangor
13:45		(Report)	Anelka 26'; A. Cole 53'	Referee: (Malaysia) Subkhiddin Sallehk

1 August 2008	Lokomotiv Moscow (Russia)	1–1 (5–4 p)	(England) Chelsea	Lokomotiv Stadium, Moscow
18:05	Kambolov 84'	(Report)	Essien 26'	Referee: (Switzerland) Massimo Busacca
	Penalties
	Bilyaletdinov (penalty missed); Spahić (penalty scored); Glushakov (penalty scored); Cociș (penalty scored); Mujiri (penalty scored); Kambolov (penalty scored)		(penalty scored) Lampard; (penalty scored) Deco; (penalty scored) Wright-Phillips; (penalty scored) Essien; (penalty missed) Bridge; (penalty missed) Shevchenko

3 August 2008	Milan (Italy)	0–5	(England) Chelsea	Lokomotiv Stadium, Moscow
11:00		(Report)	Lampard 3'; Anelka 8', 18', 51', 58'	Referee: (Russia) Yuri Baskakov

== Competitions ==
=== Overall ===
Competition	Started round	Current position / round	Final position / round	First match	Last match
Premier League	—	—	3rd	17 August 2008	24 May 2009
Champions League	Group stage	—	Semi-finals	16 September 2008	6 May 2009
Football League Cup	3rd round	—	4th round	24 September 2008	12 November 2008
FA Cup	3rd round	—	Winners	3 January 2009	30 May 2009

Source: Competitions

=== Premier League ===
==== League table ====
Pos	Team	Pld	W	D	L	GF	GA	GD	Pts	Qualification or relegation
1	Manchester United (C)	38	28	6	4	68	24	+44	90	Qualification for the Champions League group stage (Note: Since both finalists of the FA Cup (Chelsea and Everton) and the League Cup winners (Manchester United) qualified for the European competitions based on their league position, the sixth-placed team (Aston Villa) received a berth in the Europa League play-off round and the seventh-placed team (Fulham) received a berth in the Europa League third qualifying round.)
2	Liverpool	38	25	11	2	77	27	+50	86	Qualification for the Champions League group stage
3	Chelsea	38	25	8	5	68	24	+44	83	Qualification for the Champions League group stage
4	Arsenal	38	20	12	6	68	37	+31	72	Qualification for the Champions League play-off round
5	Everton	38	17	12	9	55	37	+18	63	Qualification for the Europa League play-off round

Source: Barclays Premier League
Rules for classification: 1) points; 2) goal difference; 3) number of goals scored.
(C) Champions

==== Results summary ====
Overall								Home						Away					
Pld	W	D	L	GF	GA	GD	Pts	W	D	L	GF	GA	GD	W	D	L	GF	GA	GD
38	25	8	5	68	24	+44	83	11	6	2	33	12	+21	14	2	3	35	12	+23

Source: Barclays Premier League

==== Results by round ====
Round	1	2	3	4	5	6	7	8	9	10	11	12	13	14	15	16	17	18	19	20	21	22	23	24	25	26	27	28	29	30	31	32	33	34	35	36	37	38
Ground	H	A	H	A	H	A	H	A	H	A	H	A	A	H	H	A	H	A	H	A	A	H	H	A	H	A	H	A	H	A	A	H	H	A	H	A	H	A
Result	W	W	D	W	D	W	W	W	L	W	W	W	W	D	L	W	D	D	W	D	L	W	W	L	D	W	W	W	W	L	W	W	D	W	W	W	W	W
Position	1	1	1	1	2	1	1	1	2	2	1	1	1	1	2	2	2	2	2	2	3	3	2	3	4	3	2	2	2	3	3	3	3	3	3	3	3	3
Points	3	6	7	10	11	14	17	20	20	23	26	29	32	33	33	36	37	38	41	42	42	45	48	48	49	52	55	58	61	61	64	67	68	71	74	77	80	83

Source: Matches
A = Away; H = Home; W = Win; D = Draw; L = Loss

==== Matches ====
17 August 2008 1	Chelsea	4–0	Portsmouth	Stamford Bridge, London
13:30	J. Cole 12'; Anelka 26'; Lampard 45+1' (pen.); Deco 88'	(Report)	James (yellow card) 45+1'	Attendance: 41,468; Referee: Mike Dean

24 August 2008 2	Wigan Athletic	0–1	Chelsea	JJB Stadium, Wigan
13:30	Cattermole (yellow card) 49'	(Report)	Deco 4'; Terry (yellow card) 14'; Carvalho (yellow card) 74'	Attendance: 18,139; Referee: Alan Wiley

31 August 2008 3	Chelsea	1–1	Tottenham Hotspur	Stamford Bridge, London
13:30	Deco (yellow card) 10'; Belletti 27'; J. Cole (yellow card) 45'; Bosingwa (yellow card) 86'	(Report)	Bent 45'	Attendance: 41,790; Referee: Howard Webb

13 September 2008 4	Manchester City	1–3	Chelsea	City of Manchester Stadium, Manchester
17:30	Robinho 13'	(Report)	Carvalho 16'; Mikel (yellow card) 45'; Lampard 53'; Anelka 69'; Terry (red card) 77' (suspension withdrawn)	Attendance: 47,331; Referee: Mark Halsey

21 September 2008 5	Chelsea	1–1	Manchester United	Stamford Bridge, London
14:00	Mikel (yellow card) 68'; Kalou 80'	(Report)	Park 18'; Scholes (yellow card) 36'; Ferdinand (yellow card) 41'; Neville (yellow card) 58'; Berbatov (yellow card) 60'; Rooney (yellow card) 80'; Evra (yellow card) 86'; Ronaldo (yellow card) 90'	Attendance: 41,760; Referee: Mike Riley

27 September 2008 6	Stoke City	0–2	Chelsea	Britannia Stadium, Stoke-on-Trent
15:00	Griffin (yellow card) 55'; Cresswell (yellow card) 66'	(Report)	Bosingwa 36'; Malouda (yellow card) 55'; Anelka 76'	Attendance: 27,500; Referee: Martin Atkinson

5 October 2008 7	Chelsea	2–0	Aston Villa	Stamford Bridge, London
15:00	J. Cole 21'; Anelka 43'	(Report)	Cuéllar (yellow card) 68'; Petrov (yellow card) 78'; Shorey (yellow card) 85'	Attendance: 41,593; Referee: Chris Foy

18 October 2008 8	Middlesbrough	0–5	Chelsea	Riverside Stadium, Middlesbrough
12:45	O'Neil (yellow card) 25'; Alves (yellow card) 77'	(Report)	Kalou 14'; Belletti 51'; Wheater 53' (o.g.); Lampard 63'; Malouda 67'	Attendance: 29,221; Referee: Phil Dowd

26 October 2008 9	Chelsea	0–1	Liverpool	Stamford Bridge, London
13:30	Malouda (yellow card) 53'; A. Cole (yellow card) 56'; Deco (yellow card) 79'	(Report)	Alonso 10'; Riera (yellow card) 22'; Gerrard (yellow card) 39'; Mascherano (yellow card) 65'	Attendance: 41,705; Referee: Howard Webb

29 October 2008 10	Hull City	0–3	Chelsea	KC Stadium, Hull
19:45		(Report)	Lampard 3'; J. Cole (yellow card) 11'; Anelka 50'; Deco (yellow card) 59'; Malouda 75'	Attendance: 24,906; Referee: Andre Marriner

1 November 2008 11	Chelsea	5–0	Sunderland	Stamford Bridge, London
15:00	Alex 27'; Anelka 30', 45', 53'; Lampard 51'	(Report)	Tainio (yellow card) 39'	Attendance: 41,693; Referee: Martin Atkinson

9 November 2008 12	Blackburn Rovers	0–2	Chelsea	Ewood Park, Blackburn
13:30	Warnock (yellow card) 62'; Simpson (yellow card) 80'	(Report)	Anelka 40', 68'; Malouda (yellow card) 85'	Attendance: 20,670; Referee: Chris Foy

15 November 2008 13	West Bromwich Albion	0–3	Chelsea	The Hawthorns, West Bromwich
17:30		(Report)	Bosingwa 34', (yellow card) 57'; Anelka 38', 45'; Terry (yellow card) 51'; Ivanović (yellow card) 78'	Attendance: 26,322; Referee: Steve Bennett

22 November 2008 14	Chelsea	0–0	Newcastle United	Stamford Bridge, London
15:00		(Report)	Gutiérrez (yellow card) 50'; Guthrie (yellow card) 86'	Attendance: 41,660; Referee: Phil Dowd

30 November 2008 15	Chelsea	1–2	Arsenal	Stamford Bridge, London
16:00	Djourou 31' (o.g.); Terry (yellow card) 61'; Ivanović (yellow card) 85'	(Report)	Van Persie 59', 62'	Attendance: 41,760; Referee: Mike Dean

6 December 2008 16	Bolton Wanderers	0–2	Chelsea	Reebok Stadium, Horwich
15:00	Davies (yellow card) 18'; O'Brien (yellow card) 65'	(Report)	Anelka 9'; Deco 21'; Ballack (yellow card) 81'	Attendance: 22,023; Referee: Howard Webb

14 December 2008 17	Chelsea	1–1	West Ham United	Stamford Bridge, London
16:00	Mikel (yellow card) 21'; Ballack (yellow card) 33'; A. Cole (yellow card) 37'; Anelka 51'	(Report)	Bellamy 33' (yellow card) 45+1'; Cole (yellow card) 40'	Attendance: 41,675; Referee: Mike Riley

22 December 2008 18	Everton	0–0	Chelsea	Goodison Park, Liverpool
20:00		(Report)	Terry (red card) 35'; Lampard (yellow card) 43'; A. Cole (yellow card) 43'; Ballack (yellow card) 68'	Attendance: 35,655; Referee: Phil Dowd

26 December 2008 19	Chelsea	2–0	West Bromwich Albion	Stamford Bridge, London
13:00	Drogba 3'; Lampard 45+1'; Ballack (yellow card) 74'	(Report)		Attendance: 41,417; Referee: Rob Styles

28 December 2008 20	Fulham	2–2	Chelsea	Craven Cottage, London
14:00	Dempsey 10', 90', (yellow card) 90+1'	(Report)	Lampard 50', 72'; Drogba (yellow card) 82'; Bosingwa (yellow card) 90+1'	Attendance: 25,462; Referee: Andre Marriner

11 January 2009 21	Manchester United	3–0	Chelsea	Old Trafford, Manchester
16:00	Ronaldo (yellow card) 28'; Vidić 45+2'; Rooney 63' (yellow card) 66'; Park (yellow card) 68'; Berbatov 87'	(Report)	Lampard (yellow card) 4'; Bosingwa (yellow card) 27'; Carvalho (yellow card) 28'; Terry (yellow card) 81'; Belletti (yellow card) 87'	Attendance: 75,455; Referee: Howard Webb

17 January 2009 22	Chelsea	2–1	Stoke City	Stamford Bridge, London
15:00	Belletti 88'; Lampard 90+3'	(Report) (Highlight)	Faye (yellow card) 15'; Delap 60'; Kitson (yellow card) 89'; Whelan (yellow card) 90'	Attendance: 41,788; Referee: Peter Walton

28 January 2009 23	Chelsea	2–0	Middlesbrough	Stamford Bridge, London
19:45	Kalou 58', 81'	(Report)	Shawky (yellow card) 10'; Riggott (yellow card) 56'	Attendance: 40,280; Referee: Lee Probert

1 February 2009 24	Liverpool	2–0	Chelsea	Anfield, Liverpool
16:00	Mascherano (yellow card) 21'; Alonso (yellow card) 46'; Gerrard (yellow card) 70'; Torres 89', 90+4'	(Report)	A. Cole (yellow card) 22'; Mikel (yellow card) 53'; Lampard (red card) 60'; Terry (yellow card) 61'	Attendance: 44,174; Referee: Mike Riley
Note: Lampard's red card was rescinded after the match.

7 February 2009 25	Chelsea	0–0	Hull City	Stamford Bridge, London
15:00	Mikel (yellow card) 26'	(Report)	Ashbee (yellow card) 48'; Garcia (yellow card) 80'	Attendance: 41,802; Referee: Lee Mason

21 February 2009 26	Aston Villa	0–1	Chelsea	Villa Park, Birmingham
12:45	Cuéllar (yellow card) 53'	(Report)	Anelka 19'; Ballack (yellow card) 84'; Bosingwa (yellow card) 84'; Terry (yellow card) 90'	Attendance: 42,585; Referee: Mark Halsey

28 February 2009 27	Chelsea	2–1	Wigan Athletic	Stamford Bridge, London
15:00	Alex (yellow card) 10'; Terry (yellow card) 19', (goal) 25'; Mancienne (yellow card) 77'; Lampard 90+1'	(Report)	N'Zogbia (yellow card) 24'; Cattermole (yellow card) 29'; Kapo 82'	Attendance: 40,714; Referee: Lee Probert

3 March 2009 28	Portsmouth	0–1	Chelsea	Fratton Park, Portsmouth
19:45		(Report)	Drogba 79'	Attendance: 20,326; Referee: Phil Dowd

15 March 2009 29	Chelsea	1–0	Manchester City	Stamford Bridge, London
13:30	Essien 18'	(Report)	Elano (yellow card) 29'; Evans (yellow card) 75'	Attendance: 41,810; Referee: Mike Riley

21 March 2009 30	Tottenham Hotspur	1–0	Chelsea	White Hart Lane, London
15:30	Modrić 50'	(Report)	Belletti (yellow card) 45'; Ballack (yellow card) 84'	Attendance: 36,034; Referee: Mike Dean

4 April 2009 31	Newcastle United	0–2	Chelsea	St James' Park, Newcastle
15:00		(Report)	Lampard (yellow card) 38', (goal) 56'; Mikel (yellow card) 45+3'; Malouda 65'	Attendance: 52,112; Referee: Rob Styles

11 April 2009 32	Chelsea	4–3	Bolton Wanderers	Stamford Bridge, London
15:00	Ballack 40'; Drogba 48', 63'; Lampard 60' (pen.)	(Report)	O'Brien 70'; Basham 74'; Taylor 78'	Attendance: 41,096; Referee: Peter Walton

22 April 2009 33	Chelsea	0–0	Everton	Stamford Bridge, London
20:00		(Report)	Neville (yellow card) 14'	Attendance: 41,556; Referee: Mark Halsey

25 April 2009 34	West Ham United	0–1	Chelsea	Upton Park, London
15:00	Stanislas (yellow card) 72'	(Report)	Kalou 55'	Attendance: 34,749; Referee: Mike Dean

2 May 2009 35	Chelsea	3–1	Fulham	Stamford Bridge, London
15:00	Anelka 1'; Malouda 10'; Drogba 53'	(Report)	Nevland 4'; Murphy (yellow card) 90+1'	Attendance: 41,801; Referee: Alan Wiley

10 May 2009 36	Arsenal	1–4	Chelsea	Emirates Stadium, London
16:00	Fàbregas (yellow card) 27'; Bendtner 70'	(Report)	Alex 28'; Anelka 39'; Touré 49' (o.g.); Malouda 86'	Attendance: 60,075; Referee: Phil Dowd

17 May 2009 37	Chelsea	2–0	Blackburn Rovers	Stamford Bridge, London
16:00	Malouda 4'; Bosingwa (yellow card) 27'; Anelka 59'	(Report)	Doran (yellow card) 64'; Khizanishvili (yellow card) 84'	Attendance: 40,804 (245 away); Referee: Rob Styles

24 May 2009 38	Sunderland	2–3	Chelsea	Stadium of Light, Sunderland
16:00	Bardsley (yellow card) 39'; Richardson 53'; Jones 90'	(Report) (Highlight)	A. Cole (yellow card) 34', (goal) 86'; Anelka 47'; Kalou 74'	Attendance: 42,468; Referee: Mark Halsey

=== UEFA Champions League ===
==== Group stage ====
Pos	Team	Pld	W	D	L	GF	GA	GD	Pts	Qualification	ROM	CHE	BOR	CLJ
1	(Italy) Roma	6	4	0	2	12	6	+6	12	Advance to knockout phase	—	3–1	2–0	1–2
2	(England) Chelsea	6	3	2	1	9	5	+4	11	Advance to knockout phase	1–0	—	4–0	2–1
3	(France) Bordeaux	6	2	1	3	5	11	−6	7	Transfer to UEFA Cup	1–3	1–1	—	1–0
4	(Romania) CFR Cluj	6	1	1	4	5	9	−4	4		1–3	0–0	1–2	—

Source: RSSSF

16 September 2008 1	Chelsea (England)	4–0	(France) Bordeaux	London, England
19:45	Lampard 14'; J. Cole 30'; Deco (yellow card) 58'; Malouda 82'; Anelka 90+2'	Report		Stadium: Stamford Bridge; Attendance: 39,635; Referee: Pieter Vink (Netherlands)

1 October 2008 2	CFR Cluj (Romania)	0–0	(England) Chelsea	Cluj-Napoca, Romania
19:45	Pereira (yellow card) 71'; Dani (yellow card) 90'	Report	Alex (yellow card) 40'; Anelka (yellow card) 78'	Stadium: Stadionul Dr. Constantin Rădulescu; Attendance: 20,320; Referee: Florian Meyer (Germany)

22 October 2008 3	Chelsea (England)	1–0	(Italy) Roma	London, England
19:45	Malouda (yellow card) 30'; Terry (yellow card) 72', (goal) 77'	Report	Mexès (yellow card) 22'; Panucci (yellow card) 85'	Stadium: Stamford Bridge; Attendance: 41,002; Referee: Kyros Vassaras (Greece)

4 November 2008 4	Roma (Italy)	3–1	(England) Chelsea	Rome, Italy
19:45	Panucci 34'; Vučinić 48', 58'; Perrotta (yellow card) 67'	Report	Terry 75'; Deco (yellow card) 33' (yellow-red card) 81'	Stadium: Stadio Olimpico; Attendance: 35,038; Referee: Luis Medina Cantalejo (Spain)

26 November 2008 5	Bordeaux (France)	1–1	(England) Chelsea	Bordeaux, France
19:45	Gourcuff (yellow card) 22'; Jurietti (yellow card) 55'; Diarra 83'; Chamakh (yellow card) 84'	Report	Terry (yellow card) 22'; A. Cole (yellow card) 30'; Anelka 60'; J. Cole (yellow card) 68'; Lampard (yellow card) 27' (yellow-red card) 86'	Stadium: Stade Chaban-Delmas; Attendance: 32,486; Referee: Frank De Bleeckere (Belgium)

9 December 2008 6	Chelsea (England)	2–1	(Romania) CFR Cluj	London, England
19:45	Kalou 40'; Drogba 71'; Belletti (yellow card) 76'; Mikel (yellow card) 81'	Report	Trică (yellow card) 40'; Koné 55'; Culio (yellow card) 90+1'	Stadium: Stamford Bridge; Attendance: 41,060; Referee: Peter Fröjdfeldt (Sweden)

==== Knockout phase ====
===== Round of 16 =====
25 February 2009 First leg	Chelsea (England)	1–0	(Italy) Juventus	London, England
19:45	Drogba 12'; Ballack (yellow card) 58'	Report	Molinaro (yellow card) 52'; Sissoko (yellow card) 82'; Marchisio (yellow card) 90'	Stadium: Stamford Bridge; Attendance: 38,079; Referee: Olegário Benquerença (Portugal)

10 March 2009 Second leg	Juventus (Italy)	2–2 (2–3 agg.)	(England) Chelsea	Turin, Italy
19:45	Iaquinta 19'; Salihamidžić (yellow card) 45+2'; Chiellini (yellow card) 54' (yellow-red card) 70'; Del Piero 74' (pen.) (yellow card) 90+2'	Report	Essien 45+1'; Čech (yellow card) 63'; Drogba (yellow card) 69', (goal) 83'; A. Cole (yellow card) 88'; Anelka (yellow card) 90+1'	Stadium: Stadio Olimpico di Torino; Attendance: 27,319; Referee: Alberto Undiano Mallenco (Spain)

===== Quarter-finals =====
8 April 2009 First leg	Liverpool (England)	1–3	(England) Chelsea	Liverpool, England
19:45	Torres 6'; Aurélio (yellow card) 74'	Report	Kalou (yellow card) 31'; Ivanović 39', 62', (yellow card) 60'; Drogba 67'	Stadium: Anfield; Attendance: 42,543; Referee: Claus Bo Larsen (Denmark)

14 April 2009 Second leg	Chelsea (England)	4–4 (7–5 agg.)	(England) Liverpool	London, England
19:45	Ivanović (yellow card) 28'; Drogba 51'; Alex 57'; Carvalho (yellow card) 58'; A. Cole (yellow card) 65'; Lampard 76', 89'	Report	Aurélio 19'; Alonso 28' (pen.); Benayoun (yellow card) 41'; Arbeloa (yellow card) 74'; Lucas 81'; Kuyt 83'	Stadium: Stamford Bridge; Attendance: 38,286; Referee: Luis Medina Cantalejo (Spain)

===== Semi-finals =====
28 April 2009 First leg	Barcelona (Spain)	0–0	(England) Chelsea	Barcelona, Spain
19:45	Y. Touré (yellow card) 37'; Puyol (yellow card) 74'	Report	Alex (yellow card) 25'; Ballack (yellow card) 29'	Stadium: Camp Nou; Attendance: 95,000; Referee: Wolfgang Stark (Germany)

6 May 2009 Second leg	Chelsea (England)	1–1 (1–1a agg.)	(Spain) Barcelona	London, England
20:45	Essien 9'; Alex (yellow card) 77'; Ballack (yellow card) 90+6'; Drogba (yellow card) 90+8'	Report	Alves (yellow card) 30'; Abidal (red card) 66'; Éto'o (yellow card) 90'; Iniesta 90+3', (yellow card) 90+4'	Stadium: Stamford Bridge; Attendance: 37,857; Referee: Tom Henning Øvrebø (Norway)

=== Football League Cup ===
24 September 2008 Third round	Portsmouth	0–4	Chelsea	Fratton Park, Portsmouth
19:45	Hreiðarsson (yellow card) 35'; Hughes (yellow card) 52'	(Report)	Ballack (yellow card) 5'; Lampard 36' (pen.), 49'; Malouda 45'; Kalou 64'	Attendance: 15,339; Referee: Steve Bennett

12 November 2008 Fourth round	Chelsea	1–1 (a.e.t.) (4–5 p)	Burnley	Stamford Bridge, London
19:45	Drogba 27' (yellow card) 27'	(Report)	Akinbiyi 69', (yellow card) 70'; Eagles (yellow card) 73'; Caldwell (yellow card) 58' (yellow-red card) 116'	Attendance: 41,369; Referee: Keith Stroud
	Penalties
	Lampard (penalty scored); Bridge (penalty missed); Kalou (penalty scored); Ferreira (penalty scored); Malouda (penalty scored); Mikel (penalty missed)		(penalty scored) Alexander; (penalty scored) Mahon; (penalty scored) Eagles; (penalty scored) McDonald; (penalty missed) Elliott; (penalty scored) Duff

=== FA Cup ===
3 January 2009 Third round	Chelsea	1–1	Southend United	Stamford Bridge, London
15:00	Kalou 31'; Mikel (yellow card) 56'; Carvalho (yellow card) 90+4'	(Report)	McCormack (yellow card) 51'; Grant (yellow card) 89'; Clarke 90'	Attendance: 41,090; Referee: Stuart Attwell

14 January 2009 Replay	Southend United	1–4	Chelsea	Roots Hall, Southend-on-Sea
20:10	Barrett 16'	(Report)	Mikel (yellow card) 39'; Ballack 45'; Kalou 60'; Anelka 78'; Lampard 90'	Attendance: 11,314; Referee: Chris Foy

24 January 2009 Fourth round	Chelsea	3–1	Ipswich Town	Stamford Bridge, London
15:00	Ballack 16', 59'; Lampard 85'	(Report)	Bruce (yellow card) 18', (goal) 34'; Garvan (yellow card) 59'	Attendance: 41,137; Referee: Alan Wiley

14 February 2009 Fifth round	Watford	1–3	Chelsea	Vicarage Road, Watford
17:30	Priskin 69'	(Report)	A. Cole (yellow card) 18'; Anelka 75', 77', 90'	Attendance: 16,851; Referee: Mike Dean

7 March 2009 Quarter-final	Coventry City	0–2	Chelsea	Ricoh Arena, Coventry
12:30	Beuzelin (yellow card) 78'	(Report)	Drogba 15'; Alex 72'	Attendance: 31,407; Referee: Steve Bennett

18 April 2009 Semi-final	Arsenal	1–2	Chelsea	Wembley Stadium, London
17:15	Walcott 17'; Denílson (yellow card) 73'; Touré (yellow card) 88'	(Report)	Malouda 33'; Ivanović (yellow card) 38'; Ballack (yellow card) 44'; Drogba 84', (yellow card) 85'	Attendance: 88,103; Referee: Martin Atkinson

30 May 2009 Final	Chelsea	2–1	Everton	Wembley Stadium, London
15:00	Drogba 21'; Mikel (yellow card) 63'; Lampard 72' (yellow card) 83'	(Report)	Saha 1'; Hibbert (yellow card) 8'; Neville (yellow card) 48'; Baines (yellow card) 90+2'	Attendance: 89,391; Referee: Howard Webb

== Statistics ==
=== Appearances and goals ===
No.	Pos	Nat	Player	Total		Premier League		Champions League		FA Cup		League Cup	
No.	Pos	Nat	Player	Apps	Goals	Apps	Goals	Apps	Goals	Apps	Goals	Apps	Goals
1	GK	(Czech Republic) CZE	Petr Čech	55	-44	36	-25	12	-13	6	-6	1	0
2	DF	(Serbia) SRB	Branislav Ivanović	27	2	12+5	0	4	2	3+1	0	2	0
3	DF	(England) ENG	Ashley Cole	50	1	33+1	1	9	0	7	0	0	0
5	MF	(Ghana) GHA	Michael Essien	20	3	11+1	1	5	2	2+1	0	0	0
6	DF	(Portugal) POR	Ricardo Carvalho	18	1	11+1	1	3+1	0	2	0	0	0
8	MF	(England) ENG	Frank Lampard	57	20	37	12	11	3	7	3	1+1	2
9	FW	(Argentina) ARG	Franco Di Santo	16	0	0+8	0	0+3	0	0+3	0	0+2	0
10	MF	(England) ENG	Joe Cole	20	3	14	2	4	1	2	0	0+0	0
11	FW	(Ivory Coast) CIV	Didier Drogba	42	14	15+9	5	7+3	5	5+1	3	2	1
12	MF	(Nigeria) NGR	Mikel John Obi	50	0	34+1	0	9	0	5	0	0+1	0
13	MF	(Germany) GER	Michael Ballack	46	4	22+7	1	9+1	0	5+1	3	1	0
15	MF	(France) FRA	Florent Malouda	48	9	25+7	6	9+1	1	4	1	2	1
16	FW	(England) ENG	Scott Sinclair	4	0	0+2	0	0	0	0+1	0	0+1	0
17	DF	(Portugal) POR	José Bosingwa	48	2	34	2	10	0	4	0	0	0
18	DF	(England) ENG	Wayne Bridge	12	0	3+3	0	3+1	0	0	0	2	0
18	MF	(Portugal) POR	Ricardo Quaresma	5	0	1+3	0	0	0	0+1	0	0	0
19	DF	(Portugal) POR	Paulo Ferreira	12	0	1+6	0	0+2	0	1	0	1+1	0
20	MF	(Portugal) POR	Deco	30	3	17+7	3	4	0	0+1	0	1	0
21	FW	(Ivory Coast) CIV	Salomon Kalou	43	10	17+10	6	6+2	1	5+1	2	2	1
23	GK	(Italy) ITA	Carlo Cudicini	4	-2	2	0	0	0	1	-1	1	-1
24	MF	(England) ENG	Shaun Wright-Phillips	1	0	0+1	0	0	0	0	0	0	0
26	DF	(England) ENG	John Terry	51	3	35	1	11	2	4	0	1	0
27	MF	(Brazil) BRA	Mineiro	2	0	0+1	0	0	0	0	0	1	0
33	DF	(Brazil) BRA	Alex	40	4	22+1	2	9	1	6	1	2	0
35	DF	(Brazil) BRA	Juliano Belletti	33	3	5+14	3	0+8	0	2+2	0	2	0
39	FW	(France) FRA	Nicolas Anelka	54	25	33+4	19	8+4	2	5	4	0	0
40	GK	(Portugal) POR	Hilário	1	0	1	0	0	0	0	0	0	0
42	DF	(England) ENG	Michael Mancienne	6	0	2+2	0	0+1	0	1	0	0	0
43	FW	(Slovakia) SVK	Miroslav Stoch	5	0	0+4	0	0	0	0+1	0	0	0

=== Start formations ===
Qnt	Formation	Match(es)
27	4–1–4–1	1–18 and 21 Premier League, 1–6 UEFA Champions League & 1–2 League Cup
25	4–3–3	19–20, 22–32, 34–35 and 38 Premier League, 7–10 UEFA Champions League & 1–5 FA Cup
7	4–2–3–1	33 and 36–37 Premier League, 6–7 FA Cup and 11–12 UEFA Champions League

Source: Match reports in Competitive matches
Only competitive matches.

=== Top scorers ===
Includes all competitive matches. The list is sorted by shirt number when total goals are equal.

Position	Nation	Number	Name	Premier League	Champions League	League Cup	FA Cup	Total
1	(France)	39	Nicolas Anelka	19	2	0	4	25
2	(England)	8	Frank Lampard	12	3	2	3	20
3	(Ivory Coast)	11	Didier Drogba	5	5	1	3	14
4	(Ivory Coast)	21	Salomon Kalou	6	1	1	2	10
5	(France)	15	Florent Malouda	6	1	1	1	9
6	(Germany)	13	Michael Ballack	1	0	0	3	4
=	(Brazil)	33	Alex	2	1	0	1	4
8	(Portugal)	20	Deco	3	0	0	0	3
=	(Ghana)	5	Michael Essien	1	2	0	0	3
=	(England)	10	Joe Cole	2	1	0	0	3
=	(England)	26	John Terry	1	2	0	0	3
=	(Brazil)	35	Juliano Belletti	3	0	0	0	3
13	(Serbia)	2	Branislav Ivanović	0	2	0	0	2
=	(Portugal)	17	José Bosingwa	2	0	0	0	2
15	(England)	3	Ashley Cole	1	0	0	0	1
=	(Portugal)	6	Ricardo Carvalho	1	0	0	0	1
/	/	/	Own Goals	3	0	0	0	3
			TOTALS	68	20	5	17	110

=== Disciplinary record ===
Includes all competitive matches. Players with 1 card or more included only.

Position	Nation	Number	Name	Premier League		Champions League		League Cup		FA Cup		Total (FA Total)	
Position	Nation	Number	Name	Yellow card	Red card	Yellow card	Red card	Yellow card	Red card	Yellow card	Red card	Yellow card	Red card
GK	(Czech Republic)	1	Petr Čech	0	0	1	0	0	0	0	0	1 (0)	0
DF	(Serbia)	2	Branislav Ivanović	2	0	1	0	0	0	1	0	4 (3)	0
DF	(England)	3	Ashley Cole	5	0	3	0	0	0	1	0	9 (6)	0
MF	(Ghana)	5	Michael Essien	0	0	1	0	0	0	0	0	1 (0)	0
DF	(Portugal)	6	Ricardo Carvalho	2	0	1	0	0	0	1	0	4 (3)	0
MF	(England)	8	Frank Lampard	3	1*	2	1	0	0	1	0	6 (4)	2* (1*)
MF	(England)	10	Joe Cole	2	0	1	0	0	0	0	0	3 (2)	0
FW	(Ivory Coast)	11	Didier Drogba	1	0	2	0	1	0	1	0	5 (3)	0
MF	(Nigeria)	12	Mikel John Obi	6	0	1	0	0	0	4	0	11 (10)	0
MF	(Germany)	13	Michael Ballack	6	0	3	0	1	0	1	0	11 (8)	0
FW	(France)	15	Florent Malouda	3	0	1	0	0	0	0	0	4 (3)	0
DF	(Portugal)	17	José Bosingwa	6	0	0	0	0	0	0	0	6 (6)	0
MF	(Portugal)	20	Deco	3	0	3	1	0	0	0	0	6 (3)	1 (0)
MF	(Ivory Coast)	21	Salomon Kalou	0	0	1	0	0	0	0	0	1 (0)	0 (0)
DF	(England)	26	John Terry	7	2*	3	0	0	0	0	0	10 (7)	2* (2*)
DF	(Brazil)	33	Alex	1	0	3	0	0	0	0	0	4 (1)	0
DF	(Brazil)	35	Juliano Belletti	2	0	1	0	0	0	0	0	3 (2)	0
FW	(France)	39	Nicolas Anelka	0	0	2	0	0	0	0	0	2 (0)	0
DF	(England)	42	Michael Mancienne	1	0	0	0	0	0	0	0	1 (1)	0
			TOTALS	50	3**	30	2	2	0	9	0	91 (61)	5** (3**)

* = 1 suspension withdrawn
** = 2 suspensions withdrawn

=== Overall ===
Games played	59 (38 Premier League, 12 UEFA Champions League, 7 FA Cup and 2 League Cup)
Games won	37 (25 Premier League, 5 UEFA Champions League, 6 FA Cup and 1 League Cup)
Games drawn	15 (8 Premier League, 6 UEFA Champions League and 1 FA Cup)
Games lost	7 (5 Premier League, 1 UEFA Champions League and 1 League Cup)
Goals scored	110
Goals conceded	44
Goal difference	+66
Yellow cards	91
Red cards	5 (2 withdrawn)
Worst discipline	(England) John Terry (10 (yellow card) , 2 (red card) (1 withdrawn))
Best result	5–0 (A) v Middlesbrough – Premier League – 2008.10.18
Best result	5–0 (H) v Sunderland – Premier League – 2008.11.01
Worst result	0–3 (A) v Manchester United – Premier League – 2009.01.11
Most appearances	(England) Frank Lampard (57 appearances)
Top scorer	(France) Nicolas Anelka (25 goals)
Points	126/177 (71.2%)

Source: Chelsea FC

== Honours ==
=== Individuals ===
Name	Number	Country	Award
Petr Čech	1	Czech Republic	UEFA European Club Goalkeeper of the Year (2008), Czech Golden Ball (2008)
Ashley Cole	3	England	Samsung Players' Player of the Year (2008–09)
Michael Essien	5	Ghana	Goal of the Season (2008–09) v Barcelona (UEFA Champions League Semi finals) 6 May 2009
Frank Lampard	8	England	UEFA European Club Midfielder of the Year (2008), October Premier League Player of the Month (2008), Chelsea Player of the Year (2008–09)
Deco	20	Portugal	August Premier League Player of the Month (2008)
Salomon Kalou	21	Ivory Coast	CAF Young Player of the Year (2008)
John Terry	26	England	UEFA European Club Defender of the Year (2008), FIFPro World XI (2007–08), UEFA Team of the Year (2008), Special Commitment Award (2008–09) for his 10 years of first team service.
Nicolas Anelka	39	France	November Premier League Player of the Month (2008), Barclays Golden Boot (2008–09), PFA Team of the Year (2009)
Michael Mancienne	42	England	Chelsea Young Player of the Year (2008–09)
