= 2009–10 Chelsea F.C. season =

English football club season

Chelsea
2009–10 season
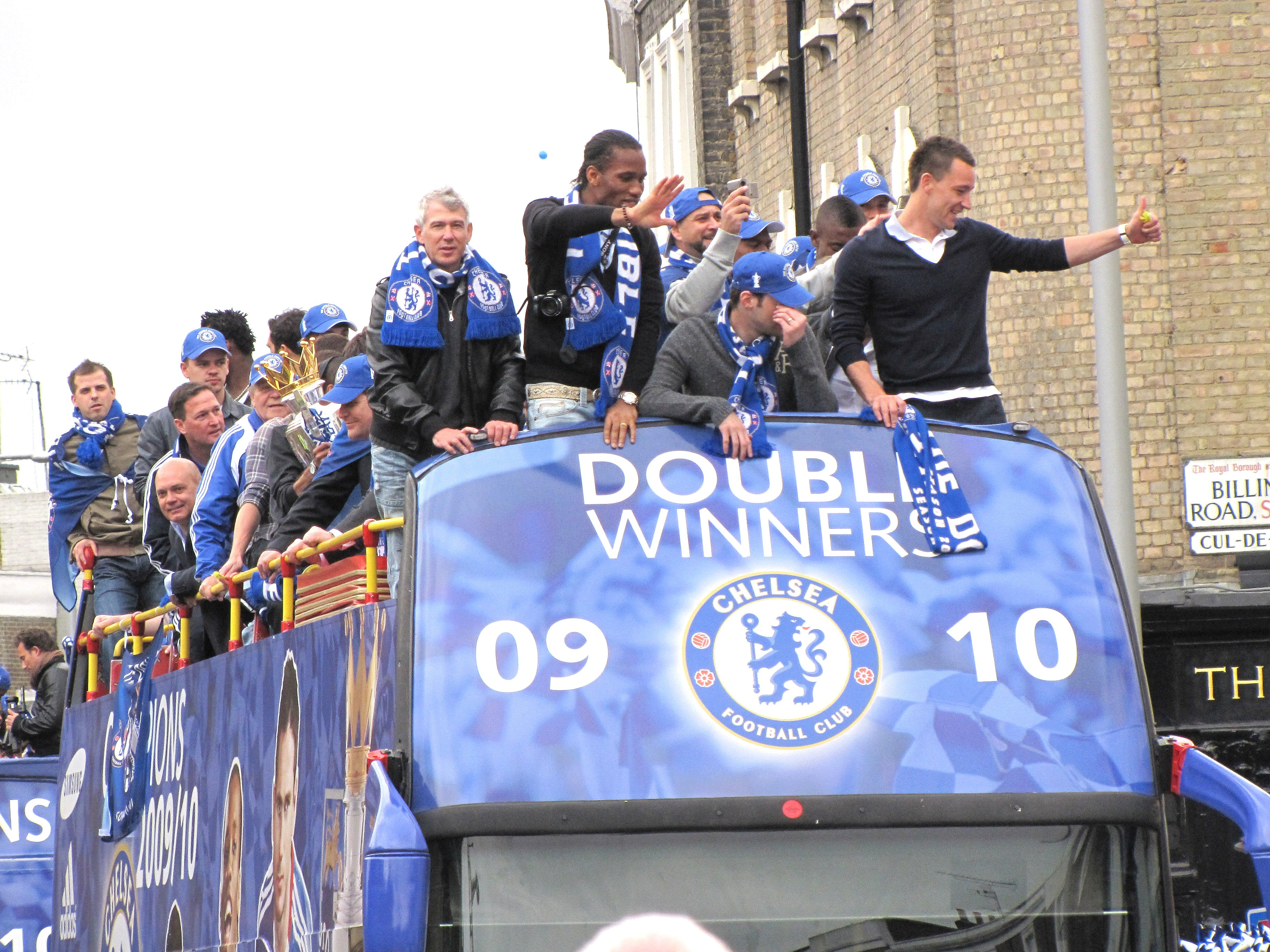
- Chelsea's domestic double parade including their 6th FA Cup title
- Owner: Roman Abramovich
- Chairman: Bruce Buck
- Manager: Carlo Ancelotti
- Stadium: Stamford Bridge
- Premier League: 1st
- FA Cup: Winners
- League Cup: Fifth round
- FA Community Shield: Winners
- UEFA Champions League: Round of 16
- Top goalscorer: League: Didier Drogba (29); All: Didier Drogba (37)
- Highest home attendance: 41,836 (vs. Manchester United, 8 November 2009)
- Lowest home attendance: 37,781 (vs. Queens Park Rangers, 23 September 2009)
Home colours	Away colours	Third colours

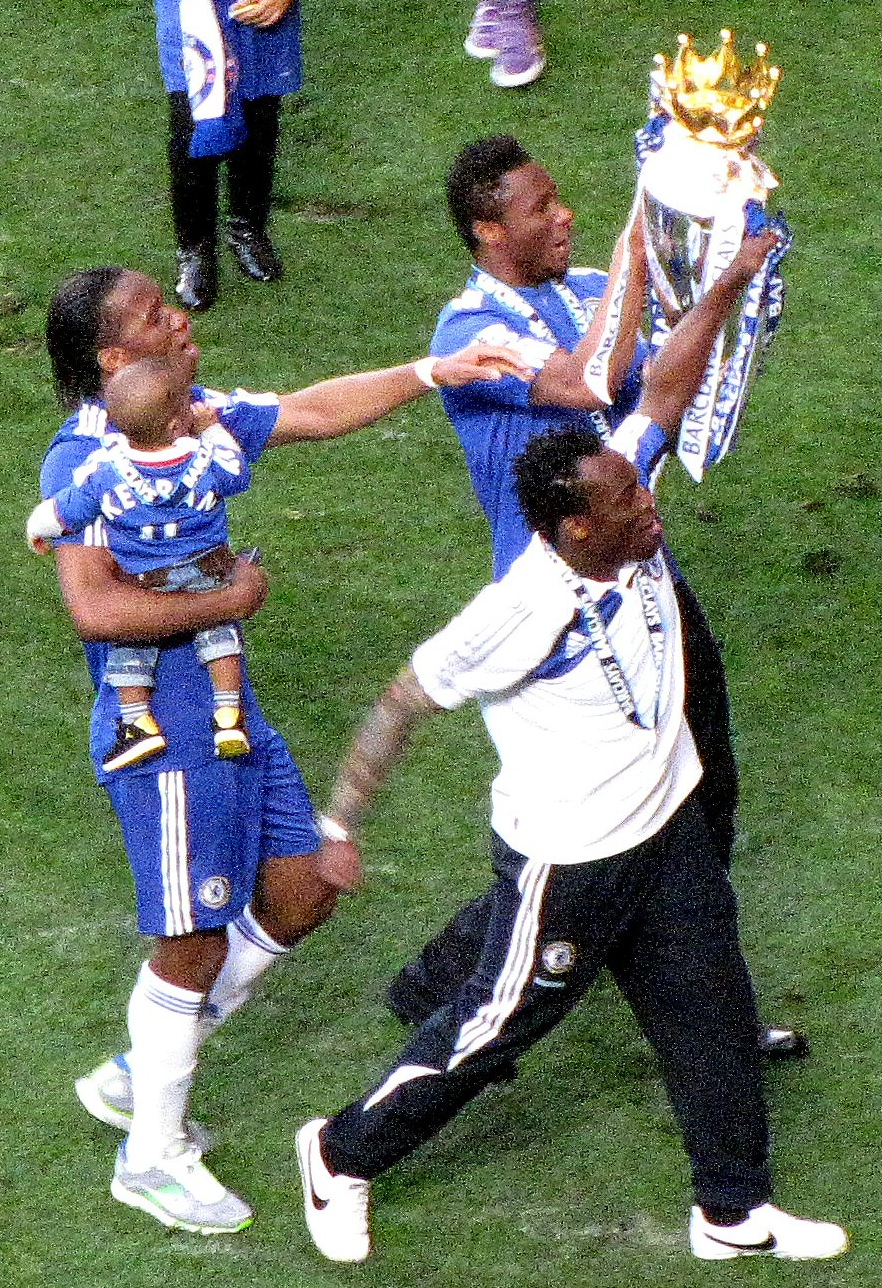
2009–2010 Premier League Champions

The 2009–10 season was Chelsea Football Club's 96th competitive season, 18th consecutive season in the Premier League, 104th year in existence as a football club and their first season coached by Carlo Ancelotti. Despite disappointment in the Champions League going out to eventual winners Inter Milan in the round of 16, the club had the most successful season in its history, winning the Premier League for a third time and retaining the FA Cup for the first time, thus becoming the seventh English club to complete the "Double".

The season is also notable for the attacking football that was displayed, which resulted in the team breaking several Premier League records and statistics including most goals scored in a season (103), most goals scored at home in a season (68) and best goal difference in a season (+71). Chelsea became the first top-flight team to reach a century of league goals since Tottenham Hotspur in 1962/63. The team only failed to score in two of 53 games, a club record. As of 2026, the team holds the Premier League record for most goals scored at home in a season.

== Kits ==
Supplier: Adidas / Sponsor: Samsung

Home	Home alt.	FA Cup Final	Away	Third	Third alt. 1	Third alt. 2

Goalkeeper 1	FA Cup Final	Goalkeeper 2	Goalkeeper alt.

== Season summary ==
Chelsea won the FA Cup and the English Premier League to complete the Double for the first time in their history, while breaking numerous Premier League records in the number of goals they managed.

== Key dates ==
- 01.06.09: Carlo Ancelotti is appointed as the new Chelsea manager following the departure of temporary first team coach Guus Hiddink, with his tenure set to commence on 1 July.
- 02.07.09: Goalkeeper Ross Turnbull signs a four-year deal on a free transfer from Middlesbrough, along with news that Henrique Hilário has renewed his contract for two more years.
- 03.07.09: Chelsea finalize a four-year deal for striker Daniel Sturridge after his contract with Manchester City expires.
- 07.07.09: Full Back Yuri Zhirkov signs for Chelsea from CSKA Moscow on a four-year deal for a reported £18 million.
- 27.07.09: Chelsea wins the inaugural World Football Challenge tournament, beating Internazionale, Milan, and América.
- 28.07.09: Former Chelsea chairman Brian Mears passes away at the age of 78.
- 04.08.09: Striker Franco Di Santo joins Blackburn Rovers on loan until 1 January.
- 06.08.09: Winger Scott Sinclair joins Wigan Athletic on a season-long loan deal.
- 09.08.09: With their first penalty shootout win in over a decade, Chelsea secure the 2009 Community Shield following a 2–2 draw against Manchester United in normal time. After United's Nani opens the scoring, goals by Ricardo Carvalho and Frank Lampard look to win the game for Chelsea until an injury-time equalizer by Wayne Rooney forces the game to penalties. Chelsea win the shootout 4–1.
- 13.08.09: Michael Mancienne signs a new four-year deal, keeping him at Chelsea until 2013, then signs on loan with Wolverhampton Wanderers until the end of the season.
- 15.08.09: Chelsea's Premier League campaign kicks off with a difficult 2–1 home victory over a defensively resolute Hull City side. After ex-Reading player Stephen Hunt scores against the run of play, a Didier Drogba free-kick makes things even. Although Chelsea dominate the second half of the game, Hull's tenacity and a lack of quality finishing make it look like the game will end a damaging draw for Chelsea, until Drogba's chipped cross in stoppage time loops over the head of Hull keeper Boaz Myhill and serendipitously falls into the corner of the net.
- 18.08.09: Chelsea sign young Serbian central midfielder Nemanja Matić from MFK Košice for a fee of £1.5 million.
- 27.08.09: Chelsea are grouped with Porto, Atlético Madrid and APOEL in the UEFA Champions League group stage draw at the Grimaldi Forum in Monaco. During the ceremony, John Terry is awarded the UEFA Club Defender of the Year award.
- 29.08.09: Chelsea claim first place in the Premier League for the first time this season with a 3–0 home win over Burnley. In a game characterised by Chelsea's dominance, after Nicolas Anelka breaks the deadlock from close range before half-time, a quick-fire double at the start of the second half via a Michael Ballack header and an Ashley Cole volley secures a comfortable victory. During the match, Chelsea are paired with fellow Londoners Queens Park Rangers in the League Cup third round draw.
- 03.09.09: For inducing reserve player Gaël Kakuta into breaching his contract with his previous club Lens, FIFA ban Chelsea from signing any new players nationally or internationally until January 2011, and demand the club to pay Lens £113,500 training compensation. Kakuta is fined £680,000 and banned from playing officially for four months.
- 15.09.09: After a hard-fought 2–1 win away against Stoke City in the Premier League, a lone Nicolas Anelka goal kicks off Chelsea's Champions League campaign with a tight 1–0 win in Group D over Porto. With mainstays Didier Drogba and José Bosingwa suspended for their protests in last year's semi-final, along with the difficulty caused by constant rainfall on the pitch, the Chelsea performance is unusually sloppy, but a solid performance by goalkeeper Petr Čech guides the team to victory. Atlético Madrid draw 0–0 at home with APOEL, leaving Chelsea two points clear at the top of the group after one game played.
- 20.09.09: With a 3–0 win at home against London rivals Tottenham Hotspur with goals from Ashley Cole, Michael Ballack and Didier Drogba, Chelsea set a new club record of 11 consecutive Premier League victories, surpassing the record of ten games set during the 2005–06 season.
- 23.09.09: Chelsea kick off their League Cup challenge with a low-key 1–0 home victory over Queens Park Rangers in the third round. Salomon Kalou notches the only goal, set up by Joe Cole in his first game since January. Yuri Zhirkov, Sam Hutchinson and Fabio Borini all make their first starts for the club.
- 26.09.09: Although Didier Drogba scores his 100th Chelsea goal against Wigan Athletic to briefly equalise, Chelsea look strangely uninspired in a 1–3 loss at the DW Stadium, having gone down to ten men after Petr Čech's sending off six minutes after half time following a penalty-worthy challenge on Hugo Rodallega. Chelsea relinquish their Premier League lead to Manchester United, falling into second place on goals scored.
- 04.10.09: In their first "Big Four" clash of the season, Chelsea edge a typically tight game at Stamford Bridge with a 2–0 Premier League victory over title rivals Liverpool. Didier Drogba sets up both Chelsea goals from wide positions, first from the left for Nicolas Anelka, and then from the right for Florent Malouda to seal the win in stoppage time. Henrique Hilário proves a solid deputy for the suspended Petr Čech, as the goalkeeper produces excellent saves from Albert Riera and Steven Gerrard to keep the clean sheet, assisted by a horrendous miss from Yossi Benayoun towards the end of the game. Manchester United's fortuitous 2–2 draw with Sunderland at Old Trafford the day before means Chelsea return to the top of the league.
- 17.10.09: Chelsea are beaten by Aston Villa 2–1 away at Villa Park. Following Didier Drogba's early strike, James Collins and Richard Dunne score the goals which inflict Chelsea's second successive away defeat under Carlo Ancelotti.
- 24.10.09: Chelsea thrash Blackburn Rovers 5–0 at Stamford Bridge in their most emphatic Premier League victory so far this season, only a few days after humbling Atlético Madrid in the Champions League by one goal less. Joe Cole enjoys a sparkling performance at the top of the midfield diamond in his first league start since January, with a Gaël Givet own goal opening the scoring. A 30-yard Michael Essien drive sandwiches two goals by Frank Lampard, and Didier Drogba completes the rout with a simple header from a corner. The next day, Liverpool break their four-game losing streak with a 2–0 victory over Manchester United at Anfield. After losing their lead again the previous week, this result leaves Chelsea two points clear.
- 4.11.09: Chelsea qualify for the Champions League knockout round after sharing the points in a 2–2 draw with Atlético Madrid at the Vicente Calderón Stadium that burst into life into the last ten minutes. After Sergio Agüero volleyed home midway through the second half, a quickfire double in the last ten minutes by the in-form Didier Drogba gives Chelsea a perhaps undeserved 2–1 lead, canceled out by an Agüero free-kick.
- 8.11.09: Chelsea beat Manchester United 1–0 at Stamford Bridge in the Premier League in a typically tight contest, decided by John Terry's header from an inswinging Frank Lampard free-kick after Darren Fletcher was controversially judged to have bundled over Ashley Cole on the left-hand side. Despite arguably controlling the game with their 4–3–3 formation, a late rally by United could not salvage them a point against a resolute Chelsea defence. Chelsea increase their lead at the top of the league by five points while Arsenal leapfrog United into second place with a game in hand.
- 22.11.09: Despite having key players like Frank Lampard, Michael Ballack and Didier Drogba missing through injury, Chelsea romp to a comfortable 4–0 victory at home to Wolves in the Premier League with goals from Florent Malouda, Joe Cole and two from a rampant Michael Essien. While Nemanja Matić makes his Chelsea debut from the bench, Gaël Kakuta also makes a flair-filled first appearance for the club.
- 29.11.09: Chelsea continue their 100% record in "Big Four" matches this season with an emphatic 3–0 away win against Arsenal at the Emirates Stadium in the Premier League. Two goals from Didier Drogba and an own goal from Thomas Vermaelen secure the victory, agreed by many to be the pinnacle of Chelsea's season thus far.
- 16.12.09: Chelsea end their run of four straight games without a win in all competitions, which began with their penalty shootout elimination by Blackburn away in the League Cup fifth round, with a closely fought 2–1 victory over Portsmouth, led by former Chelsea manager Avram Grant, at Stamford Bridge in the Premier League. After Nicolas Anelka scores from close-range in the first half, Portsmouth equalize early in the second when a Jamie O'Hara free kick ricochets off two players in the Chelsea wall, falling to Frédéric Piquionne who slots home. This typifies Chelsea's recent problem of conceding from set-pieces. The game is won ten minutes from time when Frank Lampard converts the penalty kick conceded when Marc Wilson takes out Branislav Ivanović in the Portsmouth area.
- 04.01.10: Having ended December with two away draws against West Ham United and Birmingham and a tense 2–1 home victory against Fulham in the west London derby, Chelsea begin the New Year in style with a 5–0 home demolition of Watford in the FA Cup third round, despite losing their African players to the African Cup of Nations. While Daniel Sturridge scores his first two goals for the club, Chelsea also score via a Florent Malouda deflection, a John Eustace own goal and a trademark Frank Lampard piledriver.
- 28.01.10: Chelsea end January on a high after winning all five matches in the month, demolishing Sunderland 7–2 at Stamford Bridge in the Premier League. Following that, they continue to score with a 3–0 win at home over Birmingham before a laboured 2–1 win away at Burnley, with John Terry scoring a late header to win the game amidst his affair scandal. They also progress in the FA Cup thanks to a 2–0 win away at Preston North End.
- 02.02.10: Despite an excellent January, February does not start well with Chelsea succumbing to a 1–1 draw at Hull City. Didier Drogba equalises for Chelsea late in the first-half with a free-kick after Hull's Steven Mouyokolo gave the home side the lead with a header from a corner. Chelsea go two points clear of Manchester United but missed a chance to go four points clear after failing to win their game in hand.
- 04.02.10: FIFA's suspended transfer ban on Chelsea regarding the Gaël Kakuta tapping-up case is lifted by the Court of Arbitration for Sport, along with all other sanctions.
- 27.02.10: Chelsea lose at home for the first time in the Premier League under Carlo Ancelotti as Manchester City win 4–2. The game is given extra spice as it is the first time that John Terry and Wayne Bridge have come together following allegations of Terry's affair with Bridge's girlfriend Vanessa Perroncel, which leads to him rejecting Terry's outstretched hand in the pre-match handshake. Frank Lampard opens and closes the scoring, but braces from Carlos Tevez and Craig Bellamy in between are enough to secure a Manchester City victory.
- 16.03.10: Chelsea are eliminated from the Champions League before the semi-finals for the first time in four years as a 3–1 aggregate loss to Internazionale in the first knockout round sees them crash out of the tournament. A 2–1 defeat at the San Siro on 24.02.10 is compounded by a 1–0 loss at home in the second leg, with Samuel Eto'o scoring the only goal. The match marks Mourinho's first return to Stamford Bridge as an opposition manager since his departure from Chelsea in September 2007.
- 21.03.10: Chelsea complete a disappointing week with a draw to Blackburn at Ewood Park in the Premier League. After Didier Drogba opens the scoring early on, the game looks to yield a comfortable victory for Chelsea, but a game-ending injury to Branislav Ivanovic proves costly as El Hadji Diouf equalises with twenty minutes to play, beating substitute right back Paulo Ferreira to a header at the far post. The result sees them slip to third place, four points behind Manchester United with a game in hand.
- 27.03.10: After bouncing straight back with a 5–0 victory against Portsmouth at Fratton Park in midweek, Chelsea complete their recovery from the previous week by recording their biggest win of the season with a 7–1 thrashing of Aston Villa at Stamford Bridge. In a game that sees John Terry captain the side for a record 325th time, Frank Lampard scores four times for the second time in his Chelsea career, moving him into third place in the list of Chelsea's all-time highest scorers with 151 goals, above both Peter Osgood and Roy Bentley. Florent Malouda also nets a brace and Salomon Kalou scores his first Premier League goal of the season.
- 03.04.10: Chelsea gain a crucial victory in the Premier League title race by defeating top-of-the-table Manchester United 2–1 at Old Trafford, returning to first place by two points with five games to play. The victory ensures that Chelsea maintain their 100% record in "Big Four" matches this season. After Joe Cole caps off a comfortable Chelsea first half with a clever near-post back-heel from Florent Malouda's cross to open the scoring, United begin to gain a foothold in the game in the second half. Didier Drogba comes off the bench to score the winning goal late on from an offside position, but Federico Macheda's disputedly handball goal for United minutes later sets up a nervy finish. In a game marked by a poor performance by referee Mike Dean, ignoring plausible penalty shouts by both sides, Chelsea hold on for three emphatic points.
- 10.04.10: Chelsea defeat Aston Villa at Wembley in the FA Cup semi-final to book a place in their third FA Cup Final in four years. After referee Howard Webb turns down a strong penalty appeal from Gabriel Agbonlahor in the first half following a trip from Mikel John Obi, Didier Drogba, Florent Malouda and Frank Lampard score in the second half to secure a 3–0 victory.
- 17.04.10: A 2–1 loss to Tottenham sees Chelsea's lead in the Premier League cut to one point, with Manchester United securing a late winner against Manchester City. Despite losing, Chelsea become the first English team to qualify for the 2010–11 UEFA Champions League.
- 24.04.10: Chelsea defeat Stoke City 7–0 at Stamford Bridge to record their biggest home win of the season thus far. Salomon Kalou scores his first hat-trick in English football, and a brace from Frank Lampard, coupled with goals from Florent Malouda and Daniel Sturridge, ensure the Blues cruise comfortable.
- 02.05.10: Chelsea defeat Liverpool 2–0 at Anfield in the penultimate week of the season. Didier Drogba opens the scoring following a sloppy backpass from Steven Gerrard in the first half, and Frank Lampard doubles the lead after the interval. The win ensures that Chelsea end their season with a 100% record against "Big Four" opponents, and means that victory over Wigan on the final day of the season will guarantee Premier League success.
- 06.05.10: Chelsea's Player of the Year Award goes to Didier Drogba, who claims the gong for the first time in his Chelsea career. Florent Malouda picks up the Samsung Players' Player Award, while the Young Player of the Year is awarded to the entire Chelsea U18 team after their triumph in the FA Cup Youth Final. Ashley Cole's goal against Sunderland earns him the Goal of the Season Award.
- 09.05.10: Chelsea trounce Wigan 8–0 in their final game of the season, setting a new club record for their biggest ever League win in the process as well as breaking numerous scoring records. They end the league campaign having scored 103 goals, the most in the club's history, the first Premier League side to score 100 goals in a season and the first team since Tottenham in 1961 to score 100 goals in the top flight. They also become the first team in English football history to score seven goals or more in a game on four occasions in a league season. They also finish with an English record goal difference of +71, beating Liverpool's +69 set in 1979. Didier Drogba's second half hat-trick ensures he finishes the season with the Premier League Golden Boot, having scored 29 goals, three more than the 26 scored by second-placed Wayne Rooney. Nicolas Anelka bags a brace while Frank Lampard, Salomon Kalou and Ashley Cole grab the other goals. Most significantly, the win means that Chelsea finish the season as Premier League champions with a total of 86 points, one point more than Manchester United, who finish runners-up.
- 15.05.10: In their final game of the season, Chelsea face relegated Portsmouth in an entertaining 2010 FA Cup Final at Wembley Stadium. Despite their stark difference in position in the end-of-season table and extended Chelsea pressure, with Chelsea hitting the woodwork five times in the first half, the two sides go in level at half-time. Soon after Portsmouth's Kevin-Prince Boateng's penalty is saved by Petr Čech early in the second half, Chelsea finally make their pressure count when Didier Drogba fires in a 59th minute free-kick, his 37th goal of the season. Although Frank Lampard uncharacteristically squanders a penalty of his own late on, Chelsea remain superior, the game eventually ending 1–0. Chelsea consequently end their season as only the seventh club to complete the Double, making it the most successful season in Chelsea history.

== Squad ==
=== First team squad ===
Note: Flags indicate national team as defined under FIFA eligibility rules; some limited exceptions apply. Players may hold more than one non-FIFA nationality.

No.	Pos.	Nation	Player
1	GK	CZE	Petr Čech
2	DF	SRB	Branislav Ivanović
3	DF	ENG	Ashley Cole
5	MF	GHA	Michael Essien
6	DF	POR	Ricardo Carvalho
8	MF	ENG	Frank Lampard (vice-captain)
10	MF	ENG	Joe Cole
11	FW	CIV	Didier Drogba
12	MF	NGR	Mikel John Obi
13	MF	GER	Michael Ballack
15	MF	FRA	Florent Malouda
17	DF	POR	José Bosingwa
18	MF	RUS	Yuri Zhirkov
19	DF	POR	Paulo Ferreira
20	MF	POR	Deco

No.	Pos.	Nation	Player
21	FW	CIV	Salomon Kalou
22	GK	ENG	Ross Turnbull
23	FW	ENG	Daniel Sturridge
24	MF	SRB	Nemanja Matić
26	DF	ENG	John Terry (captain)
33	DF	BRA	Alex
35	DF	BRA	Juliano Belletti
39	FW	FRA	Nicolas Anelka
40	GK	POR	Henrique Hilário
41	DF	ENG	Sam Hutchinson
43	DF	NED	Jeffrey Bruma
44	FW	FRA	Gaël Kakuta
45	FW	ITA	Fabio Borini
46	MF	ITA	Jacopo Sala
50	GK	CZE	Jan Šebek

=== Reserve squad ===
Note: Flags indicate national team as defined under FIFA eligibility rules; some limited exceptions apply. Players may hold more than one non-FIFA nationality.

No.	Pos.	Nation	Player
—	GK	WAL	Rhys Taylor
—	GK	GER	Niclas Heimann
—	DF	ENG	Nana Ofori-Twumasi
—	DF	ENG	Carl Magnay
—	DF	NED	Jeffrey Bruma
—	DF	ENG	Ben Gordon
—	DF	ENG	Ryan Bertrand (on loan at Reading)
—	DF	NED	Patrick van Aanholt
—	MF	ENG	Jack Cork (on loan at Burnley)

No.	Pos.	Nation	Player
—	MF	ENG	Liam Bridcutt
—	MF	IRL	Conor Clifford
—	MF	ENG	Jacob Mellis
—	MF	ENG	Michael Woods
—	MF	ITA	Jacopo Sala
—	MF	ENG	Danny Philliskirk
—	FW	FRA	Gaël Kakuta
—	FW	SVK	Miroslav Stoch (on loan at Twente)
—	FW	ITA	Fabio Borini

=== Youth squad ===
Note: Flags indicate national team as defined under FIFA eligibility rules; some limited exceptions apply. Players may hold more than one non-FIFA nationality.

No.	Pos.	Nation	Player
—	GK	KOS	Aldi Haxhia
—	GK	ENG	Sam Walker
—	GK	CZE	Jan Šebek
—	DF	SRI	Nikki Ahamed
—	DF	ENG	Tom Hayden
—	DF	ENG	Daniel Pappoe
—	DF	ENG	Aziz Deen-Conteh
—	DF	ENG	George Saville
—	DF	ENG	Nathaniel Chalobah
—	DF	ENG	Ben Sampayo
—	DF	ENG	Kenny Strickland
—	DF	ENG	Billy-Joe King
—	MF	POR	Aliu Djaló

No.	Pos.	Nation	Player
—	MF	ENG	Billy Clifford
—	MF	ENG	James Ashton
—	MF	TUR	Gökhan Töre
—	MF	IRL	Anton Rodgers
—	MF	ENG	Billy Knott
—	MF	ENG	Josh McEachran
—	MF	ITA	Jacopo Sala
—	MF	ENG	Jordan Tabor
—	FW	AUT	Philipp Prosenik
—	FW	SVK	Milan Lalkovič
—	FW	SWE	Marko Mitrović
—	FW	KEN	Bobby Devyne
—	FW	ENG	Adam Phillip

=== UEFA Champions League squad ===
Note: Flags indicate national team as defined under FIFA eligibility rules; some limited exceptions apply. Players may hold more than one non-FIFA nationality.

No.	Pos.	Nation	Player
1	GK	CZE	Petr Čech
2	DF	SRB	Branislav Ivanović
3	DF	ENG	Ashley Cole
5	MF	GHA	Michael Essien
6	DF	POR	Ricardo Carvalho
8	MF	ENG	Frank Lampard (vice-captain)
10	MF	ENG	Joe Cole
11	FW	CIV	Didier Drogba
12	MF	NGR	Mikel John Obi
13	MF	GER	Michael Ballack
15	MF	FRA	Florent Malouda
17	DF	POR	José Bosingwa
18	MF	RUS	Yuri Zhirkov
20	MF	POR	Deco

No.	Pos.	Nation	Player
21	FW	CIV	Salomon Kalou
22	GK	ENG	Ross Turnbull
23	FW	ENG	Daniel Sturridge
26	DF	ENG	John Terry (captain)
33	DF	BRA	Alex
35	DF	BRA	Juliano Belletti
39	FW	FRA	Nicolas Anelka
40	GK	POR	Henrique Hilário
41	DF	ENG	Sam Hutchinson
43	DF	NED	Jeffrey Bruma (from List B)
44	FW	FRA	Gaël Kakuta (from List B)
45	FW	ITA	Fabio Borini (from List B)
47	DF	SRI	Nikki Ahamed (from List B)
48	MF	ENG	Danny Philliskirk (from List B)

== Club ==
=== Coaching staff ===
Position	Staff
Manager	(Italy) Carlo Ancelotti
Assistant manager (Technical)	(England) Ray Wilkins
Assistant manager (Scientific)	(Italy) Bruno Demichelis
Assistant manager	(England) Paul Clement
Goalkeeping coach	(France) Christophe Lollichon
First-team fitness coach	(England) Glen Driscoll
Head scout	(Nigeria) Michael Emenalo
Match observer scout	(England) Mick McGiven
Club doctor	(England) Dr. Bryan English
Reserve team manager	(England) Steve Holland
Youth team manager	(England) Dermot Drummy
Academy manager	(England) Neil Bath

Source: Chelsea FC

=== Other information ===
Owner/Chairman	(Israel) (Russia) Roman Abramovich
Chairman	(United States) Bruce Buck
Chief Executive	(England) Ron Gourlay
Sporting Director and Director of Youth Development	(Denmark) Frank Arnesen
Ground (capacity and dimensions)	Stamford Bridge (42,055 / 103x67 metres)

Source: Chelsea FC

== Transfers ==
=== In ===
==== Summer ====
No.	Pos	Player	Transferred From	Fee	Date	Source
22	GK	(England) Ross Turnbull	Middlesbrough	Free	2 July 2009	
23	FW	(England) Daniel Sturridge	Manchester City	£3.5–6.5M	3 July 2009	
18	MF	(Russia) Yuri Zhirkov	CSKA Moscow	£18M	7 July 2009	
24	MF	(Serbia) Nemanja Matić	Košice	£1.5M	18 August 2009	

==== Winter ====
No transfers were completed in the winter transfer window.

=== Out ===
==== Summer ====
No.	Pos	Player	Transferred To	Fee	Date	Source
	FW	(Israel) Ben Sahar	Espanyol	£850,000	22 June 2009	
27	MF	(Brazil) Mineiro	Schalke 04	Released	30 June 2009	
	MF	(England) Jimmy Smith	Leyton Orient	Free	9 July 2009	
	FW	(England) Frank Nouble	West Ham United	Free	22 July 2009	
	FW	(Denmark) Morten Nielsen	AZ	Mutual agreement	23 July 2009	
	MF	(Spain) Sergio Tejera	Mallorca	Free	24 July 2009	
14	FW	(Peru) Claudio Pizarro	Werder Bremen	10,000,000	18 August 2009	
7	FW	(Ukraine) Andriy Shevchenko	Dynamo Kyiv	Free	28 August 2009	
	DF	(England) Shaun Cummings	Reading	Undisclosed	2 September 2009	
	MF	(England) Lee Sawyer	Barnet	Contract terminated	12 November 2009	

==== Winter ====
No.	Pos	Player	Transferred To	Fee	Date	Source
	MF	(England) Tom Taiwo	Carlisle	Undisclosed	6 January 2010	

=== Loaned out ===
No.	Pos	Player	Loaned To	Start	End	Source
4	DF	(Serbia) Slobodan Rajković	Twente	1 July 2009	1 July 2010	
	MF	(England) Tom Taiwo	Carlisle United	9 July 2009	1 January 2010	
	MF	(England) Lee Sawyer	Southend United	24 July 2009	27 October 2009	
43	MF	(Slovakia) Miroslav Stoch	Twente	15 July 2009	1 July 2010	
	DF	(England) Ryan Bertrand	Reading	17 July 2009	1 July 2010	
9	FW	(Argentina) Franco Di Santo	Blackburn Rovers	4 August 2009	1 January 2010	
16	FW	(England) Scott Sinclair	Wigan Athletic	6 August 2009	1 July 2010	
	DF	(Netherlands) Patrick van Aanholt	Coventry City	7 August 2009	1 January 2010	
42	DF	(England) Michael Mancienne	Wolverhampton Wanderers	13 August 2009	1 July 2010	
	MF	(England) Liam Bridcutt	Stockport County	14 August 2009	1 January 2010	
	MF	(England) Jacob Mellis	Southampton	14 August 2009	1 July 2010	
	DF	(England) Shaun Cummings	West Bromwich Albion	17 August 2009	2 September 2009	
	DF	(England) Jack Cork	Coventry City	21 August 2009	1 January 2010	
30	GK	(Wales) Rhys Taylor	Queens Park Rangers	20 November 2009	4 January 2010	
52	DF	(Netherlands) Patrick van Aanholt	Newcastle United	29 January 2010	28 February 2010	
	MF	(England) Jack Cork	Burnley	1 February 2010	31 May 2010	
	DF	(England) Ben Gordon	Tranmere Rovers	25 March 2010	25 April 2010	

=== Overall ===
This section displays the club's financial expenditure's in the transfer market. Because all transfer fees are not disclosed to the public, the numbers displayed in this section are only based on figures released by media outlets.

==== Spending ====
Summer: ▼£23 million

Winter: £0

Total: ▼£23 million

==== Income ====
Summer: ▲£10.85 million

Winter: £0

Total: ▲£10.85 million

==== Expenditure ====
Summer: ▼£12.15 million

Winter: £0

Total: ▼£12.15 million

== Competitions ==
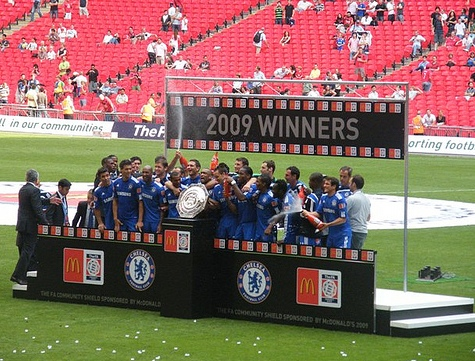
2009 Community Shield Winners

=== Overall ===
Competition	Started round	Final position / round	First match	Last match
FA Community Shield	—	Winner	9 August 2009	
Premier League	—	Winner	15 August 2009	9 May 2010
UEFA Champions League	Group stage	Round of 16	15 September 2009	16 March 2010
Football League Cup	3rd round	Fifth round	23 September 2009	2 December 2009
FA Cup	3rd round	Winner	3 January 2010	15 May 2010

Source: Competitions

=== Pre-season ===
18 July 2009	Seattle Sounders FC (United States)	0–2	(England) Chelsea	Qwest Field, Seattle
20:00 BST		(Report)	Sturridge 12'; Lampard 35', (yellow card) 90+1'	Attendance: 65,289; Referee: (United States) Alex Prus

==== World Football Challenge ====
Pos	Nation	Team	Pld	W	PKW	PKL	L	GF	GA	GD	Pts
1	England	Chelsea	3	3	0	0	0	6	1	+5	15
2	Mexico	América	3	1	1	0	1	3	4	−1	8
3	Italy	Inter Milan	3	1	0	1	1	3	3	0	7
4	Italy	Milan	3	0	0	0	3	2	6	−4	2

22 July 2009	Chelsea (England)	2–0	(Italy) Internazionale	Rose Bowl, Pasadena
04:00 BST	Drogba 11'; Lampard 50' (pen.); Ivanović (yellow card) 59'	(Report)	Burdisso (yellow card) 49'	Attendance: 81,224; Referee: (United States) Ricardo Salazar

25 July 2009	Milan (Italy)	1–2	(England) Chelsea	M&T Bank Stadium, Baltimore
01:00 BST	Flamini (yellow card) 34'; Seedorf 37'; Oddo (yellow card) 75'	(Report)	Drogba 6'; Ivanović (yellow card) 56'; Zhirkov 68'	Attendance: 71,203; Referee: (United States) Mark Geiger

27 July 2009	Chelsea (England)	2–0	(Mexico) América	Cowboys Stadium, Arlington
01:00 BST	Hutchinson (yellow card) 49'; Di Santo 76'; Malouda 78'	(Report)	Rojas (yellow card) 17'	Attendance: 57,229; Referee: (United States) Paul Ward

==== Return to England ====
1 August 2009	Reading	2–2	Chelsea	Madejski Stadium, Reading
15:00 BST	Kébé 38'; Davies 45'	(Report)	Kalou 88'; Pearce 90+1' (o.g.)	Attendance: 18,781; Referee: Peter Walton

=== FA Community Shield ===
9 August 2009	Chelsea	2–2 (4–1 p)	Manchester United	Wembley Stadium, London
15:00 BST	Ivanović (yellow card) 13'; Carvalho 52'; Lampard 71'	(Report)	Berbatov (yellow card) 4'; Nani 10'; Evra (yellow card) 80'; Owen (yellow card) 86'; Rooney 90+2'	Attendance: 85,896; Referee: Chris Foy
	Penalties
	Lampard (penalty scored); Ballack (penalty scored); Drogba (penalty scored); Kalou (penalty scored)		(penalty missed) Giggs; (penalty scored) Carrick; (penalty missed) Evra

=== Premier League ===
Chelsea's 18th consecutive season in the Premier League began on 15 August 2009 and ended on 9 May 2010. Chelsea won their fourth national league title on 86 points, one point ahead of Manchester United.

==== League table ====
Pos	Team	Pld	W	D	L	GF	GA	GD	Pts	Qualification or relegation
1	Chelsea (C)	38	27	5	6	103	32	+71	86	Qualification for the Champions League group stage
2	Manchester United	38	27	4	7	86	28	+58	85	Qualification for the Champions League group stage
3	Arsenal	38	23	6	9	83	41	+42	75	Qualification for the Champions League group stage
4	Tottenham Hotspur	38	21	7	10	67	41	+26	70	Qualification for the Champions League play-off round
5	Manchester City	38	18	13	7	73	45	+28	67	Qualification for the Europa League play-off round (Note: Since Manchester United won the League Cup and then qualified for the Champions League, their spot in the Europa League was passed down to the 6th-placed team. The 6th-placed Aston Villa was coincidentally also the League Cup runners-up.)

Source: Barclays Premier League
(C) Champions

==== Results summary ====
Overall								Home						Away					
Pld	W	D	L	GF	GA	GD	Pts	W	D	L	GF	GA	GD	W	D	L	GF	GA	GD
38	27	5	6	103	32	+71	86	17	1	1	68	14	+54	10	4	5	35	18	+17

Source: Barclays Premier League

==== Results by round ====
Round	1	2	3	4	5	6	7	8	9	10	11	12	13	14	15	16	17	18	19	20	21	22	23	24	25	26	27	28	29	30	31	32	33	34	35	36	37	38
Ground	H	A	A	H	A	H	A	H	A	H	A	H	H	A	A	H	H	A	A	H	H	H	A	A	H	A	A	H	H	A	A	H	A	H	A	H	A	H
Result	W	W	W	W	W	W	L	W	L	W	W	W	W	W	L	D	W	D	D	W	W	W	W	D	W	L	W	L	W	D	W	W	W	W	L	W	W	W
Position	6	2	2	1	1	1	2	1	2	1	1	1	1	1	1	1	1	1	1	1	1	1	1	1	1	1	1	1	1	3	2	2	1	1	1	1	1	1
Points	3	6	9	12	15	18	18	21	21	24	27	30	33	36	36	37	40	41	42	45	48	51	54	55	58	58	61	61	64	65	68	71	74	77	77	80	83	86

Source: Matches
A = Away; H = Home; W = Win; D = Draw; L = Loss

==== Matches ====
15 August 2009 1	Chelsea	2–1	Hull City	London
12:45 BST	Drogba 37', 90+2', (yellow card) 90+3'	(Report)	Hunt 28'; Mendy (yellow card) 45+2'; Barmby (yellow card) 70'	Stadium: Stamford Bridge; Attendance: 41,597; Referee: Alan Wiley

18 August 2009 2	Sunderland	1–3	Chelsea	Sunderland
19:45 BST	Bent 18'; Richardson (yellow card) 29'; Cana (yellow card) 68'	(Report)	Ballack 52'; Ivanović (yellow card) 54'; Lampard 61' (pen.); Deco 70'; Drogba (yellow card) 76'	Stadium: Stadium of Light; Attendance: 41,179; Referee: Steve Bennett

23 August 2009 3	Fulham	0–2	Chelsea	London
16:00 BST		(Report)	Drogba 39'; Anelka 76'	Stadium: Craven Cottage; Attendance: 25,404; Referee: Andre Marriner

29 August 2009 4	Chelsea	3–0	Burnley	London
12:45 BST	Anelka 45+2'; Ballack 47'; A. Cole 52'	(Report)	Mears (yellow card) 49'	Stadium: Stamford Bridge; Attendance: 40,906; Referee: Mark Clattenburg

12 September 2009 5	Stoke City	1–2	Chelsea	Stoke-on-Trent
15:00 BST	Shawcross (yellow card) 18'; Faye 32'; Delap (yellow card) 59'; Wilkinson (yellow card) 77'	(Report)	Kalou (yellow card) 16'; Drogba 45+2'; Terry (yellow card) 45+4'; A. Cole (yellow card) 52'; Malouda 90+4'	Stadium: Britannia Stadium; Attendance: 27,440; Referee: Mike Dean

20 September 2009 6	Chelsea	3–0	Tottenham Hotspur	London
16:00 BST	A. Cole 32'; Ballack 58'; Drogba 63'	(Report)	Bassong (yellow card) 66'; Jenas (yellow card) 90+4'	Stadium: Stamford Bridge; Attendance: 41,623; Referee: Howard Webb

26 September 2009 7	Wigan Athletic	3–1	Chelsea	Wigan
15:00 BST	Bramble 16'; Thomas (yellow card) 27'; Rodallega 53' (pen.); Scharner 90+1'	(Report)	Drogba 47'; Čech (red card) 51'; Carvalho (yellow card) 70'; Essien (yellow card) 86'	Stadium: DW Stadium; Attendance: 18,542; Referee: Phil Dowd

4 October 2009 8	Chelsea	2–0	Liverpool	London
16:00 BST	Essien (yellow card) 44'; Anelka 60'; Malouda 90+1'	(Report)	Gerrard (yellow card) 77'	Stadium: Stamford Bridge; Attendance: 41,732; Referee: Martin Atkinson

17 October 2009 9	Aston Villa	2–1	Chelsea	Birmingham
12:45 BST	Dunne 32'; Agbonlahor (yellow card) 35'; Collins 52'; Milner (yellow card) 90+3'	(Report)	Drogba 15'; A. Cole (yellow card) 45+1'	Stadium: Villa Park; Attendance: 39,047; Referee: Steve Bennett

24 October 2009 10	Chelsea	5–0	Blackburn Rovers	London
17:30 BST	Givet 20' (o.g.); Lampard 48', 59' (pen.); Essien 52'; Drogba 64'	(Report)	Pedersen (yellow card) 45'	Stadium: Stamford Bridge; Attendance: 40,836; Referee: Alan Wiley

31 October 2009 11	Bolton Wanderers	0–4	Chelsea	Bolton
15:00 GMT	Samuel (red card) 45+1'; Robinson (yellow card) 57'	(Report)	Lampard 45+2' (pen.); Deco 61'; Ferreira (yellow card) 80'; Ivanović 83'; Drogba 90'	Stadium: Reebok Stadium; Attendance: 22,680; Referee: Peter Walton

8 November 2009 12	Chelsea	1–0	Manchester United	London
16:00 GMT	Ivanović (yellow card) 58'; Drogba (yellow card) 74'; Terry 76'; Carvalho (yellow card) 82'	(Report)	Rooney (yellow card) 77'; Evans (yellow card) 82'; Valencia (yellow card) 89'	Stadium: Stamford Bridge; Attendance: 41,836; Referee: Martin Atkinson

21 November 2009 13	Chelsea	4–0	Wolverhampton Wanderers	London
15:00 GMT	Malouda 5'; Essien 12', 22'; J. Cole 56'	(Report)	Craddock (yellow card) 79'; Keogh (yellow card) 90'	Stadium: Stamford Bridge; Attendance: 41,786; Referee: Lee Mason

29 November 2009 14	Arsenal	0–3	Chelsea	London
16:00 GMT	Traoré (yellow card) 25'; Fàbregas (yellow card) 90+5'	(Report)	Drogba (yellow card) 37', (goal) 41', 86'; Vermaelen 45' (o.g.); Mikel (yellow card) 70'	Stadium: Emirates Stadium; Attendance: 60,067; Referee: Andre Marriner

5 December 2009 15	Manchester City	2–1	Chelsea	Manchester
18:30 GMT	Adebayor 37'; Tevez 56'; Barry (yellow card) 63'	(Report)	Adebayor 8' (o.g.); Terry (yellow card) 45+1'; Carvalho (yellow card) 55'; Belletti (yellow card) 74'; Ivanović (yellow card) 79'; A. Cole (yellow card) 85'; Deco (yellow card) 86'	Stadium: City of Manchester Stadium; Attendance: 47,348; Referee: Howard Webb

12 December 2009 16	Chelsea	3–3	Everton	London
15:00 GMT	Drogba 18', 59'; Anelka 23'	(Report)	Čech 12' (o.g.); Heitinga (yellow card) 37'; Yakubu 45+5'; Saha 63'	Stadium: Stamford Bridge; Attendance: 41,579; Referee: Phil Dowd

16 December 2009 17	Chelsea	2–1	Portsmouth	London
19:45 GMT	Anelka 23'; Lampard 79' (pen.)	(Report)	Piquionne 51'	Stadium: Stamford Bridge; Attendance: 40,137; Referee: Mark Clattenburg

20 December 2009 18	West Ham United	1–1	Chelsea	London
16:00 GMT	Franco (yellow card) 33'; Diamanti 45' (pen.); Parker (yellow card) 45+3'; Upson (yellow card) 59'	(Report)	Carvalho (yellow card) 30'; A. Cole (yellow card) 44'; Lampard 61' (pen.); Terry (yellow card) 84'	Stadium: Upton Park; Attendance: 33,388; Referee: Mike Dean

26 December 2009 19	Birmingham City	0–0	Chelsea	Birmingham
12:45 GMT	Bowyer (yellow card) 71'	(Report)	Malouda (yellow card) 61' (yellow-red card) 89'; Ivanović (yellow card) 79'	Stadium: St Andrews; Attendance: 28,958; Referee: Peter Walton

28 December 2009 20	Chelsea	2–1	Fulham	London
15:00 GMT	Drogba 73', (yellow card) 88'; Smalling 75' (o.g.)	(Report)	Gera 4'; Baird (yellow card) 56'	Stadium: Stamford Bridge; Attendance: 41,805; Referee: Andre Marriner

16 January 2010 21	Chelsea	7–2	Sunderland	London
15:00 GMT	Anelka 8', 65'; Malouda 17'; A. Cole 22'; Lampard 34', 90'; Ballack 52'	(Report)	Zenden 56'; Bardsley (yellow card) 66'; Bent 90+2'	Stadium: Stamford Bridge; Attendance: 41,776; Referee: Chris Foy

27 January 2010 22	Chelsea	3–0	Birmingham City	London
19:45 GMT	Malouda 5'; Lampard 32', 90'	(Report)		Stadium: Stamford Bridge; Attendance: 41,293; Referee: Steve Bennett

30 January 2010 23	Burnley	1–2	Chelsea	Burnley
17:30 GMT	Bikey (yellow card) 39'; Fletcher 50'	(Report)	Anelka 27'; Terry (yellow card) 33' (goal) 82'	Stadium: Turf Moor; Attendance: 21,131; Referee: Phil Dowd

2 February 2010 24	Hull City	1–1	Chelsea	Hull
19:45 GMT	Mouyokolo 30'; McShane (yellow card) 59'	(Report)	Ivanović (yellow card) 29'; Drogba 42', (yellow card) 89'; Terry (yellow card) 45'	Stadium: KC Stadium; Attendance: 24,957; Referee: Mark Clattenburg

7 February 2010 25	Chelsea	2–0	Arsenal	London
16:00 GMT	Drogba 8', 23'; Zhirkov (yellow card) 88'; J. Cole (yellow card) 88'	(Report)	Song (yellow card) 83'; Fàbregas (yellow card) 84'	Stadium: Stamford Bridge; Attendance: 41,794; Referee: Mike Dean

10 February 2010 26	Everton	2–1	Chelsea	Liverpool
20:00 GMT	Saha 33', 75'; Donovan (yellow card) 64'	(Report)	Malouda 17', (yellow card) 90+5'; Mikel (yellow card) 62'	Stadium: Goodison Park; Attendance: 36,411; Referee: Alan Wiley

20 February 2010 27	Wolverhampton Wanderers	0–2	Chelsea	Wolverhampton
15:00 GMT		(Report)	Drogba 40', 67'; Ballack (yellow card) 64'	Stadium: Molineux Stadium; Attendance: 28,978; Referee: Kevin Friend

27 February 2010 28	Chelsea	2–4	Manchester City	London
12:45 GMT	Lampard 42', 90+1' (pen.); Terry (yellow card) 49'; Ivanović (yellow card) 58'; Ballack (yellow card) 68' (yellow-red card) 81'; Belletti (red card) 75'	(Report)	Tevez 45+1', 76' (pen.); Zabaleta (yellow card) 57'; Bellamy 51', 87'	Stadium: Stamford Bridge; Attendance: 41,814; Referee: Mike Dean

13 March 2010 29	Chelsea	4–1	West Ham United	London
15:00 GMT	Alex 16'; Drogba 56', 90'; Malouda 77'	(Report)	Parker 30'; Mido (yellow card) 49'	Stadium: Stamford Bridge; Attendance: 41,755; Referee: Mark Clattenburg

21 March 2010 30	Blackburn Rovers	1–1	Chelsea	Blackburn
16:00 GMT	Diouf 70'	(Report)	Drogba 6'; Zhirkov (yellow card) 45'	Stadium: Ewood Park; Attendance: 25,554; Referee: Steve Bennett

24 March 2010 31	Portsmouth	0–5	Chelsea	Portsmouth
19:45 GMT	O'Hara (yellow card) 67'; Hughes (yellow card) 86'; James (yellow card) 90+6'	(Report)	Drogba 32', 77'; Malouda (yellow card) 40', (goal) 50', 60'; Mikel (yellow card) 90'; Lampard 90+4'	Stadium: Fratton Park; Attendance: 18,753; Referee: Lee Mason

27 March 2010 32	Chelsea	7–1	Aston Villa	London
15:00 GMT	Lampard 15', 44' (pen.), 62' (pen.), 90+1'; Zhirkov (yellow card) 31'; Deco (yellow card) 39'; Ferreira (yellow card) 48'; Malouda 57', 67'; Kalou 83'	(Report)	Petrov (yellow card) 28'; Carew 29'; Dunne (yellow card) 62'	Stadium: Stamford Bridge; Attendance: 41,825; Referee: Peter Walton

3 April 2010 33	Manchester United	1–2	Chelsea	Manchester
12:45 BST	Scholes (yellow card) 35'; Neville (yellow card) 44'; Macheda 81'; Fletcher (yellow card) 85'	(Report)	J. Cole 20', (yellow card) 72'; Deco (yellow card) 70'; Drogba 79'	Stadium: Old Trafford; Attendance: 75,217; Referee: Mike Dean

13 April 2010 34	Chelsea	1–0	Bolton Wanderers	London
20:00 BST	Anelka 43'; Alex (yellow card) 78'	(Report)	Steinsson (yellow card) 24'; Robinson (yellow card) 77'; Davies (yellow card) 78'; Elmander (yellow card) 88'	Stadium: Stamford Bridge; Attendance: 40,539; Referee: Chris Foy

17 April 2010 35	Tottenham Hotspur	2–1	Chelsea	London
17:30 BST	Defoe 15' (pen.); Bale 44'; Huddlestone (yellow card) 54'; Pavlyuchenko (yellow card) 85'	(Report)	Alex (yellow card) 17'; Deco (yellow card) 54'; Terry (yellow card) 63' (yellow-red card) 66'; Zhirkov (yellow card) 79'; Lampard 90+1'	Stadium: White Hart Lane; Attendance: 35,814; Referee: Phil Dowd

25 April 2010 36	Chelsea	7–0	Stoke City	London
16:00 BST	Kalou 24', 31', 69'; Lampard 44' (pen.), 81'; Sturridge 87'; Malouda 89'	(Report)	Whelan (yellow card) 59'; Whitehead (yellow card) 61'; Huth (yellow card) 76'	Stadium: Stamford Bridge; Attendance: 41,013; Referee: Steve Bennett

2 May 2010 37	Liverpool	0–2	Chelsea	Liverpool
13:30 BST	Mascherano (yellow card) 87'	(Report)	Malouda (yellow card) 26'; Drogba 33'; Ballack (yellow card) 40'; Lampard 54'	Stadium: Anfield; Attendance: 44,375; Referee: Alan Wiley

9 May 2010 38	Chelsea	8–0	Wigan Athletic	London
16:00 BST	Anelka 6', 56'; Lampard 32' (pen.); Kalou 54', (yellow card) 54'; Drogba 63', 68' (pen.), 80', (yellow card) 74'; A. Cole 90'	(Report)	Caldwell (red card) 31'; Gohouri (yellow card) 41'; N'Zogbia (yellow card) 49'	Stadium: Stamford Bridge; Attendance: 41,383; Referee: Martin Atkinson

=== FA Cup ===
3 January 2010 Third round	Chelsea	5–0	Watford	London
15:00 GMT	Sturridge 5', 68'; Eustace 15' (o.g.); Malouda 22'; Belletti (yellow card) 41'; J. Cole (yellow card) 43'; Lampard 64'; Matić (yellow card) 83'	(Report)	Lansbury (yellow card) 41'; Eustace (yellow card) 81'; Cleverley (yellow card) 86'	Stadium: Stamford Bridge; Attendance: 40,912; Referee: Kevin Friend

23 January 2010 Fourth round	Preston North End	0–2	Chelsea	Preston
12:45 GMT	Hart (yellow card) 24'	(Report)	Anelka 37'; Sturridge 47'	Stadium: Deepdale; Attendance: 23,119; Referee: Mike Dean

13 February 2010 Fifth round	Chelsea	4–1	Cardiff City	London
12:00 GMT	Drogba 2'; Alex (yellow card) 10'; Ballack 51'; Carvalho (yellow card) 61'; Sturridge 69'; Kalou 86'	(Report)	Chopra (yellow card) 20', (goal) 34'; Gerrard (yellow card) 67'	Stadium: Stamford Bridge; Attendance: 40,827; Referee: Andre Marriner

7 March 2010 Quarter-finals	Chelsea	2–0	Stoke City	London
16:00 GMT	Lampard 35'; Terry 67', (yellow card) 86'	(Report)		Stadium: Stamford Bridge; Attendance: 41,322; Referee: Martin Atkinson

10 April 2010 Semi-finals	Aston Villa	0–3	Chelsea	London
15:00 BST		(Report)	Deco (yellow card) 52'; Drogba 68'; Terry (yellow card) 75'; Mikel (yellow card) 84'; Malouda 89'; Lampard 90+5'	Stadium: Wembley Stadium; Attendance: 85,472; Referee: Howard Webb

15 May 2010 Final	Chelsea	1–0	Portsmouth	London
15:00 BST	Drogba 59'	(Report)	Boateng (yellow card) 36'; Rocha (yellow card) 90+1'	Stadium: Wembley Stadium; Attendance: 88,335; Referee: Chris Foy

=== League Cup ===
23 September 2009 Third round	Chelsea	1–0	Queens Park Rangers	London
19:45 BST	Kalou 52'	(Report)		Stadium: Stamford Bridge; Attendance: 37,781; Referee: Mike Jones

28 October 2009 Fourth round	Chelsea	4–0	Bolton Wanderers	London
19:45 GMT	Kalou 15'; Malouda 26'; Deco 67'; Drogba 89'	(Report)		Stadium: Stamford Bridge; Attendance: 41,538; Referee: Andre Marriner

2 December 2009 Fifth round	Blackburn Rovers	3–3 (a.e.t.) (4–3 p)	Chelsea	Blackburn
20:00 GMT	Kalinić 9'; Grella (yellow card) 62'; Emerton 64'; McCarthy 93' (pen.)	(Report)	Bruma (yellow card) 46'; Drogba 48'; Kalou 52'; Ferreira 120+2'	Stadium: Ewood Park; Attendance: 18,136; Referee: Alan Wiley
	Penalties
	McCarthy (penalty scored); Emerton (penalty scored); Grella (penalty scored); Kalinić (penalty missed); Hoilett (penalty scored)		(penalty missed) Ballack; (penalty scored) Drogba; (penalty scored) Malouda; (penalty scored) Zhirkov; (penalty missed) Kakuta

=== UEFA Champions League ===
==== Group stage ====
Pos	Team	Pld	W	D	L	GF	GA	GD	Pts	Qualification	CHE	POR	ATM	APO
1	(England) Chelsea	6	4	2	0	11	4	+7	14	Advance to knockout phase	—	1–0	4–0	2–2
2	(Portugal) Porto	6	4	0	2	8	3	+5	12	Advance to knockout phase	0–1	—	2–0	2–1
3	(Spain) Atlético Madrid	6	0	3	3	3	12	−9	3	Transfer to Europa League	2–2	0–3	—	0–0
4	(Cyprus) APOEL	6	0	3	3	4	7	−3	3		0–1	0–1	1–1	—

Source: RSSSF

15 September 2009 1	Chelsea (England)	1–0	(Portugal) Porto	London, England
19:45 BST	Essien (yellow card) 15'; Malouda (yellow card) 18'; Anelka 49'	Report	Fernando (yellow card) 78' (yellow-red card) 90'	Stadium: Stamford Bridge; Attendance: 39,851; Referee: Konrad Plautz (Austria)

30 September 2009 2	APOEL (Cyprus)	0–1	(England) Chelsea	Nicosia, Cyprus
19:45 BST		Report	Anelka 18'; Kalou (yellow card) 44'; Ivanović (yellow card) 79'	Stadium: GSP Stadium; Attendance: 21,657; Referee: Bertrand Layec (France)

21 October 2009 3	Chelsea (England)	4–0	(Spain) Atlético Madrid	London, England
19:45 BST	Kalou 41', 52'; Lampard 69'; Belletti (yellow card) 86'; Perea 90+1' (o.g.)	Report	García (yellow card) 74'; Domínguez (yellow card) 90'	Stadium: Stamford Bridge; Attendance: 39,997; Referee: Florian Meyer (Germany)

3 November 2009 4	Atlético Madrid (Spain)	2–2	(England) Chelsea	Madrid, Spain
19:45 GMT	Reyes (yellow card) 26'; Assunção (yellow card) 33'; Agüero 66', 90+1'	Report	Essien (yellow card) 17'; Drogba 61', 85'; Terry (yellow card) 87'	Stadium: Vicente Calderón; Attendance: 45,000; Referee: Björn Kuipers (Netherlands)

25 November 2009 5	Porto (Portugal)	0–1	(England) Chelsea	Porto, Portugal
19:45 GMT	Fernando (yellow card) 50'	Report	Ballack (yellow card) 57'; Anelka 66'	Stadium: Estádio do Dragão; Attendance: 38,410; Referee: Jonas Eriksson (Sweden)

8 December 2009 6	Chelsea (England)	2–2	(Cyprus) APOEL	London, England
19:45 GMT	Zhirkov (yellow card) 18'; Essien 19'; Drogba 24'	Report	Żewłakow 5'; Poursaitidis (yellow card) 85'; Mirosavljević 87'	Stadium: Stamford Bridge; Attendance: 40,917; Referee: Matteo Trefoloni (Italy)

==== Knockout phase ====
===== Round of 16 =====
24 February 2010 First leg	Internazionale (Italy)	2–1	(England) Chelsea	Milan, Italy
19:45 GMT	Milito 3' (yellow card) 22'; Motta (yellow card) 10'; Cambiasso 55'	Report	Kalou (yellow card) 23' (goal) 51'	Stadium: San Siro; Attendance: 84,638; Referee: Manuel Mejuto González (Spain)

16 March 2010 Second leg	Chelsea (England)	0–1 (1–3 agg.)	(Italy) Internazionale	London, England
19:45 GMT	Malouda (yellow card) 55'; Drogba (yellow card) 57' (red card) 87'; Alex (yellow card) 83'; Terry (yellow card) 89'	Report	Eto'o (yellow card) 17', (goal) 79'; Motta (yellow card) 48'; Lúcio (yellow card) 54'; Júlio César (yellow card) 82'	Stadium: Stamford Bridge; Attendance: 38,107; Referee: Wolfgang Stark (Germany)

== Statistics ==
=== Appearances and goals ===
No.	Pos	Nat	Player	Total		Premier League		Champions League		FA Cup		League Cup	
No.	Pos	Nat	Player	Apps	Goals	Apps	Goals	Apps	Goals	Apps	Goals	Apps	Goals
1	GK	(Czech Republic) CZE	Petr Čech	42	0	34+0	0	6+0	0	2+0	0	0+0	0
2	DF	(Serbia) SRB	Branislav Ivanović	40	1	25+3	1	6+0	0	3+0	0	3+0	0
3	DF	(England) ENG	Ashley Cole	34	4	25+2	4	4+0	0	2+0	0	0+1	0
5	MF	(Ghana) GHA	Michael Essien	21	4	13+1	3	5+1	1	0+0	0	0+1	0
6	DF	(Portugal) POR	Ricardo Carvalho	28	0	22+0	0	5+0	0	1+0	0	0+0	0
7	FW	(Ukraine) UKR	Andriy Shevchenko*	1	0	0+1	0	0+0	0	0+0	0	0+0	0
8	MF	(England) ENG	Frank Lampard	50	26	36+0	22	6+1	1	6+0	3	0+1	0
10	MF	(England) ENG	Joe Cole	39	2	14+12	2	2+3	0	3+2	0	3+0	0
11	FW	(Ivory Coast) CIV	Didier Drogba	43	37	31+1	29	5+0	3	4+0	3	0+2	2
12	MF	(Nigeria) NGR	Mikel John Obi	34	0	21+4	0	4+0	0	3+0	0	2+0	0
13	MF	(Germany) GER	Michael Ballack	44	5	26+6	4	5+1	0	3+1	1	2+0	0
15	MF	(France) FRA	Florent Malouda	50	15	26+7	12	7+1	0	4+2	2	3+0	1
17	DF	(Portugal) POR	José Bosingwa	8	0	8+0	0	0+0	0	0+0	0	0+0	0
18	MF	(Russia) RUS	Yuri Zhirkov	27	0	10+7	0	3+1	0	4+0	0	2+0	0
19	DF	(Portugal) POR	Paulo Ferreira	20	1	11+2	0	0+0	0	4+0	0	3+0	1
20	MF	(Portugal) POR	Deco	28	3	14+5	2	2+2	0	3+0	0	2+0	1
21	FW	(Ivory Coast) CIV	Salomon Kalou	36	12	11+12	5	5+1	3	2+2	1	3+0	3
22	GK	(England) ENG	Ross Turnbull	5	0	2+0	0	2+0	0	0+0	0	0+1	0
23	FW	(England) ENG	Daniel Sturridge	20	5	2+11	1	0+2	0	3+1	4	1+0	0
24	MF	(Serbia) SRB	Nemanja Matić	3	0	0+2	0	0+0	0	0+1	0	0+0	0
26	DF	(England) ENG	John Terry	51	3	37+0	2	8+0	0	5+0	1	0+1	0
33	DF	(Brazil) BRA	Alex	25	1	13+3	1	2+0	0	6+0	0	1+0	0
35	DF	(Brazil) BRA	Juliano Belletti	22	0	4+7	0	4+1	0	2+1	0	3+0	0
39	FW	(France) FRA	Nicolas Anelka	44	15	31+2	11	6+1	3	3+1	1	0+0	0
40	GK	(Portugal) POR	Henrique Hilário	11	0	2+1	0	0+1	0	4+0	0	3+0	0
41	DF	(England) ENG	Sam Hutchinson	3	0	0+2	0	0+0	0	0+0	0	1+0	0
43	DF	(Netherlands) NED	Jeffrey Bruma	3	0	0+2	0	0+0	0	0+0	0	0+1	0
44	FW	(France) FRA	Gaël Kakuta	4	0	0+1	0	1+0	0	0+1	0	0+1	0
45	FW	(Italy) ITA	Fabio Borini	8	0	0+4	0	0+1	0	0+2	0	1+0	0
52	DF	(Netherlands) NED	Patrick van Aanholt	2	0	0+2	0	0+0	0	0+0	0	0+0	0

Notes:

- * = Player is no longer with the club but still made an appearance during the season.

=== Top scorers ===
Includes all competitive matches. The list is sorted by shirt number when total goals are equal.

Rnk	No.	Player	Premier League	Champions League	League Cup	FA Cup	Community Shield	Total
1	11	(Ivory Coast) Drogba	29	3	2	3	0	37
2	8	(England) Lampard	22	1	0	3	1	27
3	15	(France) Malouda	12	0	1	2	0	15
3	39	(France) Anelka	11	3	0	1	0	15
5	21	(Ivory Coast) Kalou	5	3	3	1	0	12
6	13	(Germany) Ballack	4	0	0	1	0	5
6	23	(England) Sturridge	1	0	0	4	0	5
8	3	(England) Cole	4	0	0	0	0	4
8	5	(Ghana) Essien	3	1	0	0	0	4
10	20	(Portugal) Deco	2	0	1	0	0	3
10	26	(England) Terry	2	0	0	1	0	3
12	10	(England) Cole	2	0	0	0	0	2
13	2	(Serbia) Ivanović	1	0	0	0	0	1
13	6	(Portugal) Carvalho	0	0	0	0	1	1
13	19	(Portugal) Ferreira	0	0	1	0	0	1
13	33	(Brazil) Alex	1	0	0	0	0	1
Own goals			4	1	0	1	0	6
TOTALS			103	12	8	17	2	142

=== Disciplinary record ===
Includes all competitive matches. Players with 1 card or more included only.

Position	Nation	Number	Name	Premier League		Champions League		League Cup		FA Cup		Total (FA Total)	
Position	Nation	Number	Name	Yellow card	Red card	Yellow card	Red card	Yellow card	Red card	Yellow card	Red card	Yellow card	Red card
GK	(Czech Republic)	1	Petr Čech	0	1	0	0	0	0	0	0	0 (0)	1 (1)
DF	(Serbia)	2	Branislav Ivanović	6	0	1	0	0	0	0	0	7 (6)	0
DF	(England)	3	Ashley Cole	4	0	0	0	0	0	0	0	4 (4)	0
MF	(Ghana)	5	Michael Essien	2	0	2	0	0	0	0	0	4 (2)	0
DF	(Portugal)	6	Ricardo Carvalho	4	0	0	0	0	0	1	0	5 (5)	0
MF	(England)	10	Joe Cole	1	0	0	0	0	0	1	0	2 (2)	0
FW	(Ivory Coast)	11	Didier Drogba	7	0	1	1	0	0	0	0	8 (7)	1 (0)
MF	(Nigeria)	12	Mikel John Obi	3	0	0	0	0	0	1	0	4 (4)	0
MF	(Germany)	13	Michael Ballack	4	1	1	0	0	0	0	0	5 (4)	1 (1)
MF	(France)	15	Florent Malouda	5	1	2	0	0	0	0	0	7 (5)	1 (1)
MF	(Russia)	18	Yuri Zhirkov	4	0	1	0	0	0	0	0	5 (4)	0
DF	(Portugal)	19	Paulo Ferreira	2	0	0	0	0	0	0	0	2 (2)	0
MF	(Portugal)	20	Deco	4	0	0	0	0	0	1	0	5 (5)	0
FW	(Ivory Coast)	21	Salomon Kalou	2	0	2	0	0	0	0	0	4 (2)	0
MF	(Serbia)	24	Nemanja Matić	0	0	0	0	0	0	1	0	1 (1)	0
DF	(England)	26	John Terry	7	1	2	0	0	0	2	0	11 (9)	1 (1)
DF	(Brazil)	33	Alex	2	0	1	0	0	0	1	0	4 (3)	0
DF	(Brazil)	35	Juliano Belletti	1	1	1	0	0	0	1	0	3 (2)	1 (1)
DF	(Netherlands)	43	Jeffrey Bruma	0	0	0	0	1	0	0	0	1 (1)	0
			TOTALS	58	5	14	1	1	0	9	0	82 (68)	6 (5)

=== Overall ===
Games played	55 (38 Premier League, 8 UEFA Champions League, 3 Football League Cup, 6 FA Cup)
Games won	39 (27 Premier League, 4 UEFA Champions League, 2 Football League Cup, 6 FA Cup)
Games drawn	7 (5 Premier League, 2 UEFA Champions League)
Games lost	9 (6 Premier League, 2 UEFA Champions League, 1 Football League Cup)
Goals scored	142
Goals conceded	44
Goal difference	+98
Clean sheets	29
Yellow cards	82
Red cards	6
Worst discipline	(England) John Terry (11 (yellow card) , 1 (red card) )
Best result(s)	8–0 (H) v Wigan Athletic – Premier League – 9 May 2010
Worst result(s)	2–4 (H) v Manchester City – Premier League – 27 February 2010
Worst result(s)	3–1 (A) v Wigan Athletic – Premier League – 23 September 2009
Most appearances	John Terry with 51 appearances
Top scorer	(Ivory Coast) Didier Drogba (37 goals)
Points	124/165 (75.15%)

Source: Chelsea FC

== Honours ==
=== Player ===
No.	Player	Award	Source
1	(Czech Republic) Petr Čech	2009 Czech Footballer of the Year, 2009–10 Barclays Golden Glove	
2	(Serbia) Branislav Ivanović	PFA Team of the Year (2010)	
3	(England) Ashley Cole	Goal of the Season (2009–10) v Sunderland (Premier League) 16 January 2010	
8	(England) Frank Lampard	2010 Football Writers' Association Tribute Award	
11	(Ivory Coast) Didier Drogba	2009 BBC African Footballer of the Year, 2009 African Footballer of the Year, PFA Team of the Year (2010), Chelsea Player of the Year (2009–10), 2010 Barclays Golden Boot Winner	
15	(France) Florent Malouda	Player of the Month (March 2010), Samsung Players' Player of the Year (2009–10)	
26	(England) John Terry	UEFA European Club Defender of the Year (2009), FIFPro World XI (2008–09)	

=== Manager ===
Manager	Award	Source
(Italy) Carlo Ancelotti	Manager of the Month (November 2009)	

== See also ==
- Chelsea F.C.
