= Nikki Ahamed =

Sri Lankan footballer (born 1991)

Personal information
- Date of birth: 18 April 1991 (age 35)
- Place of birth: Colombo, Sri Lanka
- Height: 1.75 m (5 ft 9 in)
- Position: Midfielder

Youth career
- 1999–2009: Chelsea

Senior career*
Years	Team	Apps	(Gls)
2009–2010	Chelsea	0	(0)
- Wealdstone
2012–2013	Mafra	5	(0)
2013–2014	FSV Frankfurt II	27	(1)
2014	Wealdstone	3	(0)
2014–2016	Metropolitan Police	37	(0)
2016	Enfield Town	3	(0)
Total		75	(1)
- * Club domestic league appearances and goals

Nikki Ahamed (born 18 April 1991) is a former footballer who played as a midfielder for a number of clubs in England and Europe.

== Club career ==
=== Early life ===
Born in Colombo, Sri Lanka, Nigerian mother and Sri Lankan father he moved to London when he was a child. He signed for Chelsea when he was 7 years old and played for the u9s at the time. During his time with Chelsea, he was called up to the senior squad bench, but never made a professional appearance.

After 12 years with The Blues, he was released at the end of the 2009–10 season.

=== Moves to Portugal and Germany ===
After a spell with Wealdstone and a trial with French side Châteauroux, Ahamed moved to Portugal to sign with third division Mafra. Following one season with Mafra, in which he made 5 appearances, he went on trial with Croatian side Hajduk Split.

After the unsuccessful trial in Croatia, Ahamed signed with German club FSV Frankfurt, and was assigned to their second team for the 2013–14 season. He made a total of twenty-seven appearances, scoring once.

=== Return to England ===
On his return to England, Ahamed rejoined Wealdstone, and made three appearances in the Conference South. He would go on to play for Metropolitan Police, where he made thirty-seven league appearances. He ended his career with Enfield Town.

== Career statistics ==
=== Club ===
Club	Season	League			Cup		Other		Total	
Club	Season	Division	Apps	Goals	Apps	Goals	Apps	Goals	Apps	Goals
Chelsea	2009–10	Premier League	0	0	0	0	0	0	0	0
Mafra	2012–13	Segunda Divisão	5	0	0	0	0	0	5	0
FSV Frankfurt II	2013–14	Hessenliga	27	1	0	0	0	0	27	1
Wealdstone	2014–15	Conference South	3	0	0	0	0	0	3	0
Metropolitan Police	2014–15	Ryman League	24	0	0	0	3 (Note: Two appearances in FA Trophy qualification, one appearance in the Ryman League playoffs)	0	27	0
Metropolitan Police	2015–16	Ryman League	13	0	0	0	3 (Note: Two appearances in FA Trophy qualification, one appearance in the Alan Turvey Trophy)	0	16	0
Metropolitan Police	Total		37	0	0	0	6	0	43	0
Enfield Town	2016–17	Ryman League	3	0	0	0	1 (Note: Appearance in the Alan Turvey Trophy)	0	4	0
Career total			75	1	0	0	7	0	82	1
