= Jordan Tabor =

English footballer (1990–2014)

Personal information
- Full name: Jordan Benjamin Tabor
- Date of birth: 9 September 1990
- Place of birth: Wallingford, Oxfordshire, England
- Date of death: 23 July 2014 (aged 23)
- Place of death: Antalya, Turkey
- Positions: Left back; central midfielder; striker

Youth career
- –2005: Leicester City
- 2005–2009: Chelsea

College career
Years	Team	Apps	(Gls)
2011	Santa Barbara Vaqueros		

Senior career*
Years	Team	Apps	(Gls)
2009	Cheltenham Town	0	(0)
2009–2011	Didcot Town		
2009	→ Witney United (loan)		
2012	Pali Blues	9	(1)
2012–2013	Kidlington		
2013–2014	A.F.C. Hinksey		
- * Club domestic league appearances and goals

Jordan Benjamin Tabor (9 September 1990 – 23 July 2014) was an English footballer who primarily played as a left back, but also played as a central midfielder or as a striker in the latter part of his career.

Prior to his death, the last club he played for was A.F.C. Hinksey in the Hellenic Football League Division 1 East.

== Career ==
Tabor joined Chelsea on schoolboy terms in 2005, and signed a two-year scholarship with the West London side in 2007. During the scholarship, he made 50 appearances for the U-18 team, and three for the reserves. He was occasionally used as an attacking left winger because of his offensive traits, including a very impressive ability to cross. Chelsea did not offer him a professional contract, and he was released by the club in 2009.

He joined Southern Football League Premier Division side Didcot Town on trial, before he was offered a trial at League Two Cheltenham Town. He eventually signed for the club on a non-contract basis, on 21 July 2009. He appeared regularly for Cheltenham's reserves, and was named on the bench for the first team on five occasions. However, he did not make an appearance in the league, and his only appearance for the club came in a Football League Trophy first round tie against Torquay United on 1 September 2009. He was released by the club on 1 October 2009. Following this, Tabor spent the rest of the season at Didcot Town, with a short loan spell to Witney United.

In 2011, Tabor moved to the US, attending Santa Barbara City College in California, on a sports scholarship. He played as a central midfielder for the SBCC men's soccer team, captaining the side to the Western State Conference title, advancing to the State Final Four for the first time since 1998, and finishing with an 18-2-4 record. He was regarded as one of the best midfielders in SBCC's men's soccer history, having scored eleven times and assisting twelve times. He also recorded two of the longest goals in their history, a 50-yard free kick against the LA Harbor Seahawks and a 45-yard strike against the Citrus Owls.

Tabor then had a stint playing for Pali Blues, a team in the fourth-tier USL Premier Development League, where he made nine appearances, scoring and assisting once.

Returning to England, Tabor signed for Kidlington in October 2012. By this point, he had moved further upfield, playing as a striker, and scored on his debut against Ascot United. He signed for A.F.C. Hinksey at the start of the 2013–14 season, and again scored on his debut, this time against Woodley Town.

== Death ==
On 23 July 2014, in the early hours of the morning, whilst on holiday with his girlfriend Danielle McEachran and her family, he fell from a third floor balcony at the Titanic Beach Hotel in Antalya, Turkey. He was 23 years old at the time of his death.

Tributes poured in from friends, family and colleagues; notably his mother, Louise Bates, his father, Craig Jeffery, his girlfriend's brother Josh (with whom he had played at Chelsea), Coronation Street stars Brooke Vincent and Antony Cotton, and his coach at Santa Barbara, John Sisterton. He was laid to rest at St Trinity Church in Abingdon, Oxfordshire on 5 August 2014.
