= A.F.C. Hinksey =

English football club in Oxford

Coordinates: 51°46′11.28″N 1°12′20.44″W

- Full name: Association Football Club Hinksey
- Nickname: The Bulls
- Founded: 2006
- Dissolved: 2014
- Ground: Culham Road, Abingdon (Groundshare with Abingdon Town F.C.)
- Chairman: Gavin Preston
- Manager: Kevin McMahon
- 2013–14: Hellenic Football League Division One East, 3rd
- Website: http://www.afchinksey.co.uk
Home colours

A.F.C. Hinksey was an English football club in Oxford. The club last played in the Hellenic Football League Division One East and folded in 2014.

== History ==
AFC Hinksey started life as a pub team when The Shelley Arms F.C. were formed in the 2006–07 season, by Gavin Preston. The team was entered into the RT Harris Football League, made up of teams from within the City of Oxford. The first season saw The Shelley Arms complete an historic treble which included the Doug Hobbs Cup, the RT Harris Senior Cup and the RT Harris First Division, gaining promotion to the Premier Division of The RT Harris Football League. The second season saw another treble in the bag with the RTH Premier Cup, retaining RTH Senior Cup and winning the RT Harris Premier Division, and in the process gaining promotion to the Oxfordshire Senior League.

Oxfordshire Senior League guidelines stated that 'pub teams' were not to compete in their competition and so AFC Hinksey were born, moving to the Hinksey area of Oxford to play at Brasenose College. Starting in Division 2 of the Senior League, Hinksey again achieved promotion at the first attempt, The following season (2009/10) saw Hinksey win the Oxfordshire Senior League First Division claiming yet another promotion.

By now, Hinksey had gained promotion in every season they had been in existence and in their first season in the top division of the Senior League, Hinksey bagged a double, winning the Premier Division and the Oxfordshire Senior League President's Cup. The next season saw Hinksey again finish top of the Premier Division table only to be deducted 9 points. The club finished as runners up but were still eligible for promotion to the Hellenic Football League. The rise up the football pyramid stalled slightly as Hinksey found their feet in the Hellenic League Division One East but finished in mid table. The club left the league after failing to register in time for the 2014–15 season.

== Colours ==
A.F.C. Hinksey's colours were purple shirts, with black shorts and socks.

== Grounds ==
The club played at Abingdon Town, Culham Road, Abingdon.

They shared the ground with landlords Abingdon Town.

== Honours ==
- Oxfordshire Senior Football League Premier Division
  - Champions 2010–11
  - Runners-up 2011–12
- Oxfordshire Senior Football League Division One
  - Champions 2009–10
