= Morten Nielsen (footballer, born 1990) =

Danish footballer (born 1990)

Personal information
- Full name: Morten Nielsen
- Date of birth: 28 February 1990 (age 36)
- Place of birth: Copenhagen, Denmark
- Height: 1.92 m (6 ft 4 in)
- Position: Forward

Youth career
- 2003–2005: KB
- 2005–2008: Chelsea

Senior career*
Years	Team	Apps	(Gls)
2008–2009	Chelsea	0	(0)
2009	→ Landskrona BoIS (loan)	9	(2)
2009–2010	AZ	0	(0)
2010	→ Landskrona BoIS (loan)	9	(2)
2010–2012	Midtjylland	1	(0)
2011	→ Fredericia (loan)	4	(0)
2012–2013	Greve Fodbold	26	(11)
2013	Rot-Weiß Erfurt	11	(1)
2014–2015	BK Avarta	24	(19)
2015–2016	Sligo Rovers	27	(5)
2016–2019	FC Roskilde	70	(28)
2019–2020	Hvidovre IF	13	(3)
Total		194	(71)

International career
2006	Denmark U16	2	(1)
2006–2007	Denmark U17	7	(2)
2007–2008	Denmark U18	5	(1)
2008–2009	Denmark U19	12	(3)
- * Club domestic league appearances and goals as of 20:17, 1 August 2020 (UTC)

Morten Nielsen (born 28 February 1990) is a Danish footballer who plays as a forward.

Nielsen has played in England, Sweden, Netherlands, Denmark, Germany and Ireland. He made over 20 appearances for Denmark at youth level.

== Career ==
Nielsen began his career with KB, before joined Chelsea's academy in 2005 and became a pro in July 2007. He has made several appearances for the Danish Under 18 national football team.

On 31 March 2009, whilst being tracked by many European clubs as Rennes, Saint Etienne, Brøndby and Celtic, Nielsen joined Superettan team Landskrona BoIS on loan until the end of the season.

On 9 July 2009, Nielsen ended his contract with Chelsea on a mutual agreement, becoming a free agent, and on 21 July 2009 joined AZ Alkmaar on a free transfer after impressing in a trial. On 13 March 2010, it was announced that he would return to Landskrona BoIS on loan.

In the summer of 2010, he went back to Denmark to play for FC Midtjylland.

In January 2012, he went to play for Greve Fodbold in the Danish fourth tier. The club was at that time managed by his father Benny Nielsen.

In January 2015, he was signed by Sligo Rovers ahead of the 2015 League of Ireland season.

After leaving FC Roskilde in July 2019, Nielsen joined Hvidovre IF. The club announced the signing on 25 August 2019, the same day as he got his official debut for the club. He left the club by the end of the season.

== Personal ==
Morten is the son of the former professional Danish footballer Benny Nielsen, who now works as an agent.
