= Niclas Heimann =

German footballer (born 1991)

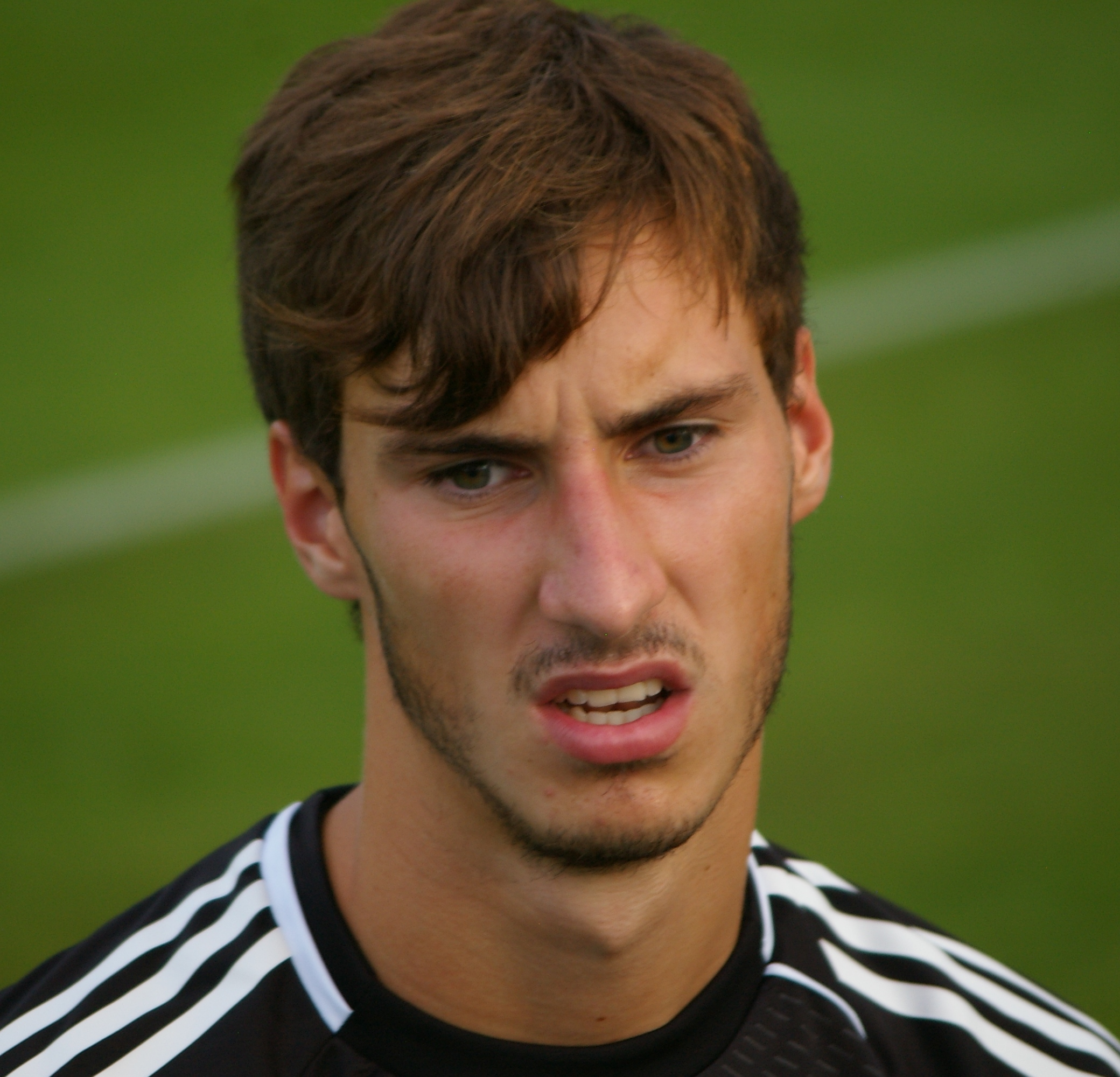
- Heimann in 2011

Personal information
- Date of birth: 12 March 1991 (age 35)
- Place of birth: Engelskirchen, Germany
- Height: 1.94 m (6 ft 4 in)
- Position: Goalkeeper

Youth career
- 2005–2007: Bayer Leverkusen
- 2007–2010: Chelsea

Senior career*
Years	Team	Apps	(Gls)
2010–2012	Red Bull Salzburg II	47	(0)
2012–2013	VVV-Venlo	1	(0)
2013–2014	Energie Cottbus	0	(0)
2014–2017	Rot-Weiss Essen	67	(0)
2017–2020	SV Rödinghausen	81	(0)
2020–2022	SSV Ulm	41	(0)
2022–2023	SGV Freiberg	17	(0)
Total		254	(0)

International career
2009	Germany U18	1	(0)
2010–2011	Germany U20	3	(0)
- * Club domestic league appearances and goals

Niclas Heimann (born 12 March 1991) is a German former professional footballer who plays as a goalkeeper.

With Rot-Weiss Essen Heimann won the Lower Rhine Cup in 2015 and 2016.
