= 2013–14 Chelsea F.C. season =

English football club season

Chelsea
2013–14 season
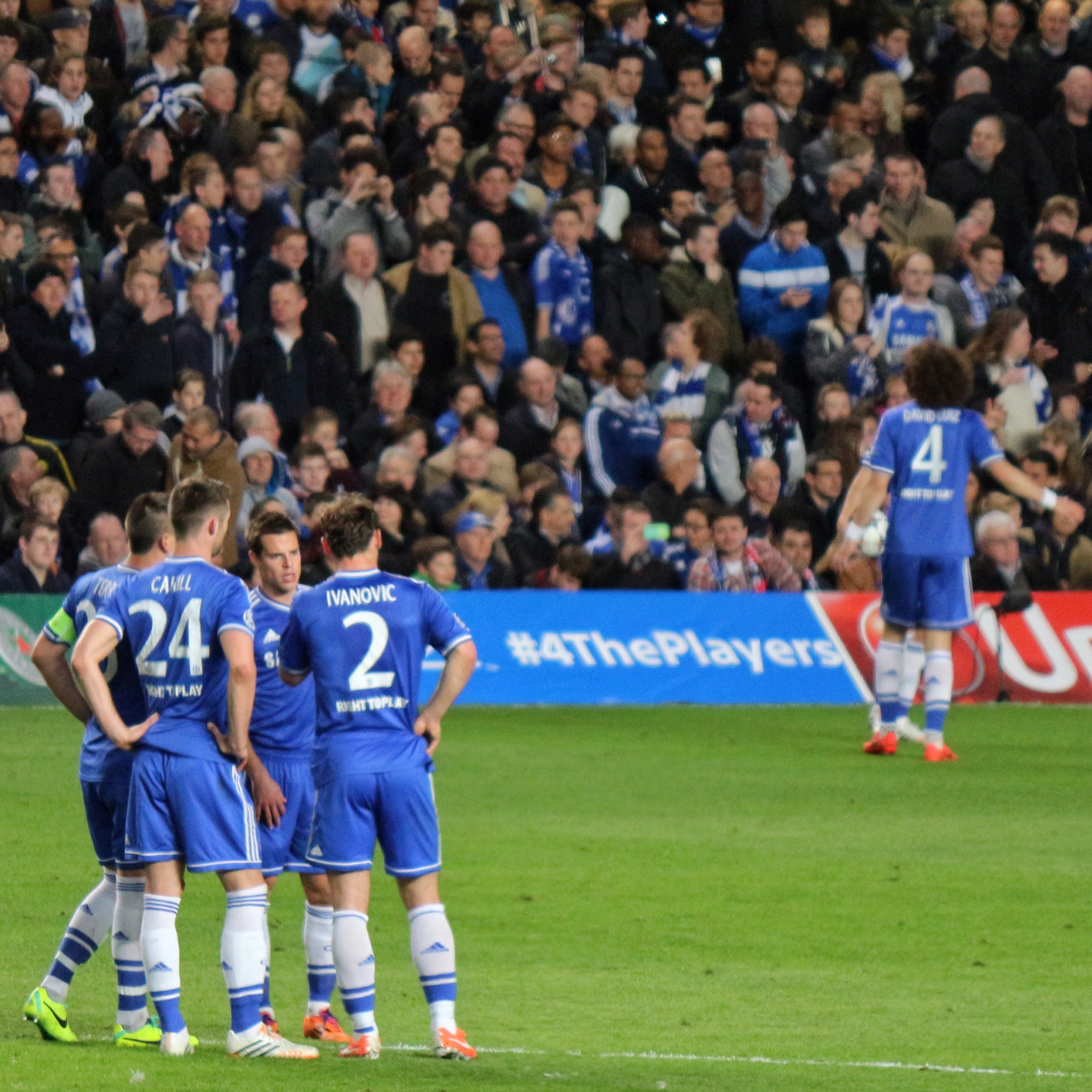
- Chelsea players before taking a kick-off at a match against Paris Saint-Germain
- Owner: Roman Abramovich
- Chairman: Bruce Buck
- Manager: José Mourinho
- Stadium: Stamford Bridge
- Premier League: 3rd
- FA Cup: Fifth round
- League Cup: Fifth round
- UEFA Champions League: Semi-finals
- UEFA Super Cup: Runners-up
- Top goalscorer: League: Eden Hazard (14); All: Eden Hazard (17)
- Highest home attendance: 41,623 vs West Bromwich Albion (9 November, Premier League)
- Lowest home attendance: 38,059 vs Basel (18 September, UEFA Champions League)
Home colours	Away colours	Third colours

The 2013–14 season was Chelsea Football Club's 100th competitive season, 25th consecutive season in the top flight of English football, 22nd consecutive season in the Premier League and 108th year in existence as a football club. In addition to the domestic league, Chelsea participated in the UEFA Champions League this season, having qualified directly for the group stage by virtue of finishing third in the 2012–13 Premier League. It ultimately reached the semi-finals, losing there to Atlético Madrid. Chelsea came third in the Premier League for a second successive season, thus again qualifying for the Champions League group stage. Chelsea ended their 2013–14 campaign without a trophy, a first since the 2010–11 season. Their league performance, however, was the best since the 2009–10 season, with the team amassing 82 points.

== Kits ==
Supplier: adidas / Sponsor: Samsung

Home	Home alt.	Away	Away alt. 1	Away alt. 2	Third	Goalkeeper 1	Goalkeeper 2	Goalkeeper 3

== Month-by-month review ==
=== June ===
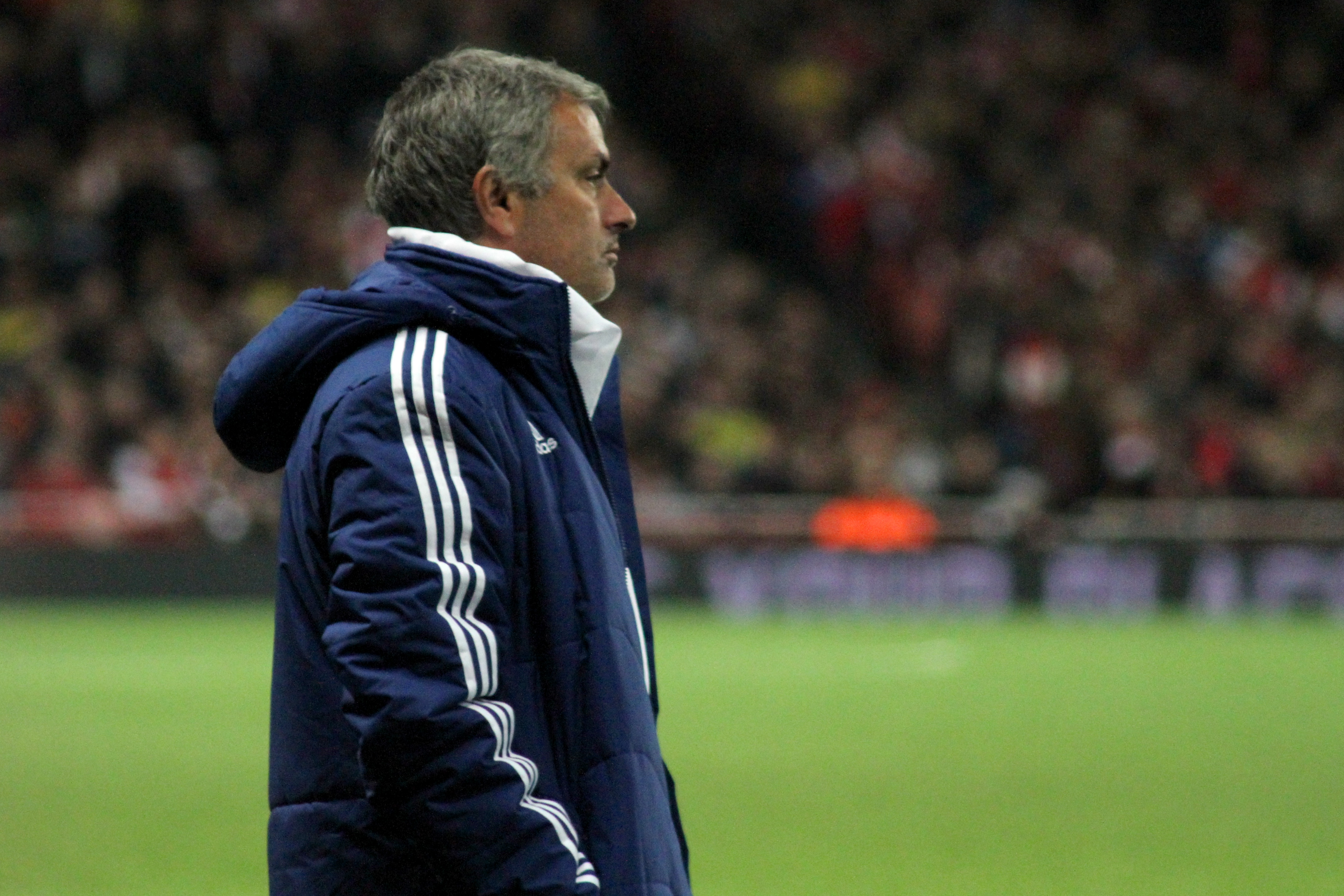
José Mourinho returned as Chelsea's manager in June 2013.

On 3 June, Chelsea announced that former manager José Mourinho had been appointed as the new manager for the 2013–14 season. He signed a four-year contract with the Blues, up to the end of the 2016–17 season. He was re-united with former squad members John Terry, Frank Lampard, Ashley Cole, John Obi Mikel, Petr Čech, Henrique Hilário and Michael Essien whom he brought back from his loan spell at Real Madrid. Mourinho also brought three coaching staff members with him to Stamford Bridge in Rui Faria, Silvino Louro—both of whom had worked at Chelsea under Mourinho's previous tenure—and José Morais. Mourinho was officially announced to the media on 10 June and took charge of the team on 1 July for the pre-season. One of Mourinho's first games was against Barcelona rival Pep Guardiola, as he managed 2012–13 UEFA Champions League winners Bayern Munich in the 2013 UEFA Super Cup at the Eden Arena in Prague. In Mourinho's first official interview back, he referred to himself as "The Happy One" in regards to his appointment as the new Chelsea manager, having called himself "The Special One" during his first tenure.

On 13 June, Chelsea and Bayer Leverkusen reached an agreement for the transfer of André Schürrle, subject to the completion of legal documentation and related matters, including personal terms and passing a medical.

Following the release of the 2013–14 Premier League fixtures, Mourinho's first match in charge since his return was at home against Hull City. Chelsea then faced a trip to Old Trafford for David Moyes' first home game as Manchester United manager. The Blues will finish their campaign away to Cardiff City. During his first spell in charge at Chelsea, Mourinho was unbeaten in 60 league home games.

On 21 June, the club announced a contract extension with Adidas that will see them supply the club kits until 2023. This deal means that Chelsea, along with Arsenal, hold the record for the biggest shirt deal in the history of the Barclays Premier League, valued at £300 million.

Chelsea completed the signing of André Schürrle for a fee of around £18.75 million. Schürrle became Mourinho's first signing since returning to the club, signing a five-year deal. He is the first player to wear the number 14 shirt since Claudio Pizarro in 2007–08.

Marko Marin left Chelsea to go on loan at Sevilla for the duration of the season while Todd Kane and George Saville also went on season long and half-season loans to Blackburn Rovers and Brentford, respectively. Meanwhile, goalkeeper Thibaut Courtois will remain on loan at Atlético Madrid for at least another season.

A number of players were released by the club; Yossi Benayoun, Florent Malouda; who joined Trabzonspor in Turkey; Ross Turnbull, who signed for Doncaster Rovers; and several youth prospects that failed to live up to expectation. Paulo Ferreira retired from football after several years at the club and Jeffrey Bruma was sold to PSV for £2.5 million.

=== July ===
Chelsea signed midfielder Marco van Ginkel from Dutch club Vitesse for an undisclosed fee, but a reported £8 million deal. The 20-year-old signed on a five-year deal and was Chelsea's second signing of the summer. Van Ginkel won the 2012 Dutch Football Talent of the Year.

Chelsea also announced the signing of former Fulham goalkeeper Mark Schwarzer, on a free transfer. After having two bids rejected for Norwich City goalkeeper John Ruddy, Mourinho decided to sign Mark Schwarzer as back up for Petr Čech. Oriol Romeu left Chelsea to go on loan at Valencia for the entirety of the season, while West Bromwich Albion youngster Isaiah Brown was signed for around £250,000. Mourinho won his first game back as Chelsea boss after overseeing a 1–0 friendly victory over the Singha All-Stars on 17 July in Chelsea's first leg of their Asian tour in Bangkok. A few days later, on 21 July, Chelsea won the second leg of their Asian tour with a 4–1 victory over a Malaysian XI in Shah Alam. On 23 July, Chelsea announced the signing of Cristián Cuevas from Chilean club O'Higgins.

Chelsea rounded off their Asian tour with an 8–1 demolition of the BNI Indonesia All-Stars in Jakarta on 25 July.

A number of young players were sent on loan to gain first-team experience; Patrick van Aanholt and Gaël Kakuta were both sent on loan to Vitesse for another season, Matej Delač was sent on a season-long loan to Vojvodina in Serbia, whilst Sam Walker and Daniel Pappoe were both loaned to Colchester United for the first half of the season. Additionally, Patrick Bamford, Billy Clifford and Milan Lalkovič were sent on half-season loans to Milton Keynes Dons, Yeovil and Walsall respectively, whilst Eden Hazard's younger brother Thorgan also saw his loan with Zulte-Waregem in Belgium renewed for the season.

=== August ===
On 1 August, Chelsea announced that senior reserve goalkeeper Henrique Hilário had signed a new one-year deal after his contract had expired in June. Another youngster was signed, teenage Croatian striker Stipe Perica. Eighteen-year-old defender Nathan Aké signed a new five-year contract with Chelsea, he made six appearances for the Blues last season.

Chelsea recorded a comfortable 2–0 victory over Inter Milan in Round 1 of prestige exhibition tournament the International Champions Cup on 1 August in Indianapolis. Chelsea registered another win in their Round 2 fixture three days later on 4 August, once again a comfortable 2–0 victory, this time over Internazionale's cross-town rivals Milan in New York City. On 7 August, Chelsea lost their perfect pre-season record after they were defeated in the International Champions Cup final by Real Madrid in Miami, losing 3–1. Chelsea won their final game of pre-season in a 2–1 victory over Roma in Washington, D.C., on 10 August. This marked the end of a largely successful pre-season for Chelsea, registering wins over Italian top flight opposition in Inter, Milan and Roma, while comfortably defeating three Asian sides.

Yet again, more youngsters were sent on loan and in keeping with Chelsea's special relationship with Vitesse, newly signed Chilean youngster Cristián Cuevas and Lucas Piazon were sent on loan to the Dutch side while Jhon Pírez will spend another season out on loan at third division Spanish outfit Leganés. Promising young full-back Wallace was sent on loan to Inter Milan and newly signed striker Stipe Perica joined NAC Breda.

On 18 August, Mourinho won his "second" first competitive game in charge of Chelsea with a 2–0 victory over Hull City. Despite Frank Lampard's early penalty miss, Oscar gave Chelsea the lead, poking the ball under the onrushing Allan McGregor after a sumptuous passing move. A superb 35-yard free kick from Lampard sealed the win before the half-hour. The victory meant that Mourinho's Chelsea were unbeaten at Stamford Bridge in 61 league games. Chelsea continued their strong home form under Mourinho with a narrow 2–1 win over Aston Villa on 21 August. An own goal by Antonio Luna opened the scoring after Brad Guzan's save from an Eden Hazard shot rebounded off of him and into the net. Villa later equalised through a quickfire shot from Christian Benteke inside Petr Čech's near post, but after 73 minutes, Branislav Ivanović connected with Lampard's free kick to head home the winner. On 28 August, it was confirmed that Chelsea had signed Willian for £30 million from Anzhi Makhachkala. It was reported that Roman Abramovich used his Russian connections and called the Anzhi owner to convince him to join, even though he had already completed a medical for Tottenham Hotspur.

In their final game before their UEFA Super Cup clash with Bayern Munich, Chelsea were held by Manchester United to a dour 0–0 draw at Old Trafford on 26 August. Just before Chelsea were drawn in the 2013–14 UEFA Champions League group stage, they announced the signing of Samuel Eto'o from Anzhi in a deal believed to be around £2 million. Chelsea were drawn in Group E alongside Schalke 04, Basel and Steaua București. Last season, Chelsea defeated Steaua and Basel on their way to the 2012–13 UEFA Europa League title.

On 30 August, Chelsea were beaten in the UEFA Super Cup by Bayern Munich on penalties at the Eden Arena in Prague. The match was a tense encounter largely dominated by Bayern, but Chelsea were dangerous on the break, opening the scoring through a fantastic strike from Fernando Torres, who was set up by André Schürrle, who had received the ball from Eden Hazard following a mazy run. Bayern equalised through a sweetly struck shot by Franck Ribéry inside Petr Čech's near post. With five minutes left, Ramires was sent off for a second bookable offence leaving Chelsea to face extra-time with ten men. Early in the first half of extra-time, Hazard put Chelsea ahead after beating two Bayern defenders and wrong-footing Manuel Neuer. Chelsea managed to hold on until the final five seconds after spending much of extra-time camped in their own 18-yard box, but Javi Martínez broke their hearts putting the ball past Čech after a deflection carried it into his path. During the penalty shoot-out, all the players on both sides scored their penalties up until Chelsea's final penalty taker, Romelu Lukaku, hit a tame penalty that was saved by Neuer, thus sealing the win for Bayern.

Position at the end of August
Pos	Team	Pld	W	D	L	GF	GA	GD	Pts
1	Chelsea	3	2	1	0	4	1	+3	7
2	Manchester City	3	2	0	1	8	3	+5	6
3	Liverpool	2	2	0	0	2	0	+2	6
4	Tottenham Hotspur	2	2	0	0	2	0	+2	6
5	Stoke City	3	2	0	1	3	2	+1	6

=== September ===
Chelsea announced the signing of Porto winger Christian Atsu for a reported £3.5 million. The 21-year-old was sent to Chelsea's partner club Vitesse, who have been sent many young Chelsea players for development in recent years, on a season-long loan. On the final day of the transfer window, Victor Moses and Romelu Lukaku joined Merseyside clubs Liverpool and Everton, respectively, on season-long loans whilst Ulises Dávila was sent to Córdoba in Spain. Later in the month, young English players Nathaniel Chalobah and Josh McEachran were sent on loan to Nottingham Forest and Watford, respectively, until the turn of the year.

On 14 September, Mourinho suffered the first defeat of his "second coming" as Chelsea were defeated 1–0 by Everton through a Steven Naismith header in first-half stoppage time after an impressive defensive display by the Merseyside club at Goodison Park. Four days later, Chelsea suffered a shock defeat by Basel in their opening group game in the Champions League at Stamford Bridge. Chelsea opened the scoring just before the interval through a tidy finish by Oscar from eight yards out, though two quickfire goals for Basel in the last 15 minutes from Mohamed Salah and Marco Streller condemned Chelsea to their first-ever loss in an opening group game of the Champions League.

Chelsea won their following fixture in the Premier League on 21 September after a four-game winless streak and two game losing streak in all competitions against Fulham. The 2–0 victory was secured by two close-range finishes by Oscar and John Obi Mikel respectively, the latter being a staggering surprise, as Mikel had not scored for Chelsea since 2007 and became the source of many jokes between Chelsea fans.

After two well-worked goals from Fernando Torres and Ramires, Chelsea comfortably defeated Swindon Town in their League Cup third round tie on 24 September to set up a trip to the Emirates to face local rivals Arsenal. Four days later, Chelsea faced another local rival in Tottenham. The game ended all square with Tottenham going in front through a Gylfi Sigurðsson goal in the 19th minute, and the Chelsea equaliser coming from a Juan Mata set piece which that headed in by Chelsea captain John Terry in the 65th minute. A controversial moment in this game involving Jan Vertonghen and Fernando Torres resulted in the latter being sent off for a second bookable offence for a perceived elbow into Vertonghen's face, replays suggest there was little, if any contact.

Position at the end of September
Pos	Team	Pld	W	D	L	GF	GA	GD	Pts
3	Tottenham Hotspur	6	4	1	1	6	2	+4	13
4	Everton	6	3	3	0	9	6	+3	12
5	Chelsea	6	3	2	1	7	3	+4	11
6	Southampton	6	3	2	1	5	2	+3	11
7	Manchester City	6	3	1	2	14	7	+7	10

=== October ===
On 1 October, Chelsea convincingly defeated Steaua București in Romania 0–4 in their second Champions League group game. The rout was started with a tap-in from Ramires, followed by a saved Samuel Eto'o shot rebounding off a defender's shin for a second. In the second half, Ramires completed a brace with a strong shot into the near post after impressive wing-play by André Schürrle and Frank Lampard finished Steaua off with a trade-mark goal, a low shot from 18 yards skimming in off the base of the far post. Chelsea won their third game in a row by defeating Norwich 1–3 at Carrow Road on 6 October. Chelsea went ahead in the fourth minute through an 18-yard strike from Oscar, though they were pulled back in the 68th minute by an Anthony Pilkington header before Eden Hazard scored the winner from a quick counter-attack, the win was sealed with a spectacular finish from Willian, scoring his first for Chelsea.

Chelsea continued their fine form, beating Cardiff City 4–1 on 19 October, their third consecutive win in all competitions. Cardiff opened the scoring through Jordon Mutch, capitalising on a David Luiz mistake, however Chelsea dominated the game from there on in, with two goals from Eden Hazard and high quality finishes from Samuel Eto'o and Oscar completing the rout. This victory preserved Chelsea's perfect home league record. Three days later, Chelsea earned three valuable points after defeating Schalke 04 3–0 in their third Champions League group game, with Fernando Torres scoring a brace and Eden Hazard scoring late on through an impressive solo effort.

On 27 October, Chelsea faced Manchester City, an important game for both sides looking to continue strong league forms. The match was a tense encounter in which Fernando Torres played superbly, netting a late winner following a defensive mix-up after setting up André Schürrle for Chelsea's first. Manchester City equalised through Sergio Agüero early in the second half, however they could not hold on for a point.

A Chelsea containing ten changes defeated Arsenal in the Fourth round of the League Cup, with a goal in each half from Spaniards César Azpilicueta and Juan Mata. The following day, the Blues were drawn to face either Southampton or Sunderland away in the next round.

Chelsea completed the signing of promising 18-year-old midfielder Bertrand Traoré on a four-and-a-half-year contract. He had previously played for the Blues on the pre-season tour of Asia and scored against the Malaysia XI and the Indonesia All Stars.

Position at the end of October
Pos	Team	Pld	W	D	L	GF	GA	GD	Pts
1	Arsenal	9	7	1	1	20	9	+11	22
2	Chelsea	9	6	2	1	16	6	+10	20
3	Liverpool	9	6	2	1	17	8	+9	20
4	Tottenham Hotspur	9	6	1	2	9	5	+4	19
5	Southampton	9	5	3	1	10	3	+7	18

=== November ===
An underwhelming Chelsea display ended in defeat by Newcastle United on 2 November, with goals from Yoan Gouffran and Loïc Rémy. In a post-match interview, Mourinho expressed his bewilderment at the result: "I am angry, because I don't understand why after a fantastic run of matches, we lose this game"(BBC MOTD). Chelsea continued their strong Champions League form by defeating Schalke 04 3–0 at Stamford Bridge on 6 November in their fourth group game with a brace from Samuel Eto'o and an acrobatic volley from Demba Ba, thus making it three consecutive wins without conceding a goal.

Three days later, Chelsea drew 2–2 with West Brom at home, a last minute Eden Hazard penalty saving the point. On 23 November, Chelsea returned to winning ways following the international break with a 0–3 win against West Ham United at Upton Park. A brace from Frank Lampard either side of a fine finish from Oscar sealed the win for the Blues and moved them up above Southampton to third. Chelsea again displayed inconsistent form, however, later losing 1–0 to Basel on 26 November without registering a shot on target.

Position at the end of November
Pos	Team	Pld	W	D	L	GF	GA	GD	Pts
1	Arsenal	13	10	1	2	27	10	+17	31
2	Liverpool	12	7	3	2	24	13	+11	24
3	Chelsea	12	7	3	2	21	10	+11	24
4	Everton	13	6	6	1	21	13	+8	24
5	Newcastle United	13	7	2	4	19	18	+1	23

=== December ===
Chelsea started December with a home win against Southampton, continuing their strong home form in the league. The Saints took a shock early lead, Jay Rodriguez finding the back of the net with only 13 seconds on the clock. The Blues came back to win through second half goals from John Terry, Gary Cahill and a late goal from substitute Demba Ba. Chelsea's next match saw them defeat a spirited Sunderland side 3–4 in a thrilling, topsy-turvy encounter at the Stadium of Light; yet again the Blues went behind but were able to fight back to get the win following a mercurial display by Eden Hazard, who scored a brace. After three wins on the trot, Chelsea went to the Britannia Stadium looking to close the gap on leaders Arsenal to one point. Having gone 0–1 up through a solo effort from André Schürrle, things seemed to be going well, but Stoke capitalised on a defensive error to go into the break tied at 1–1. A Stephen Ireland goal put the hosts ahead, but not for long as Schürrle scored his third of the season and second of the match, again from outside the area. A draw was looking likely until Oussama Assaidi gave Stoke the full three points with a curling strike from 20 yards out to send Mourinho's men away empty-handed.

Chelsea finished in first place in their Champions League group after beating Steaua București at Stamford Bridge through a solitary Demba Ba goal. They were then subsequently drawn to play Galatasaray in the first knockout round, meaning former legendary forward Didier Drogba will play Chelsea for the first time since leaving the club after the 2012 Champions League Final. Chelsea edged passed Crystal Palace 2–1 following a sublime Ramires strike, to move two points behind Arsenal after they lost 6–3 to Manchester City.

Chelsea travelled to the Stadium of Light for the second time in a month to face Sunderland in the quarter-final of the League Cup. Despite leading for most of the second half through a scrambled Frank Lampard finish (this goal was the first incident to require the use of hawk-eye technology in League Cup history) and barely being troubled by their opponents' attack, a late equaliser from former Chelsea man Fabio Borini pushed the game into extra time, where a 118th-minute winner from Ki Sung-yueng saw Chelsea dumped out of the Capital One Cup. On 23 December, Chelsea faced a tough trip to Arsenal yet they came through it unscathed, drawing 0–0, keeping their first clean sheet since the 3–0 victory over West Ham. On Boxing Day, an Eden Hazard goal granted Mourinho's team a 1–0 win over Swansea City. Chelsea's final game of 2013 ended in a superb victory over Liverpool. Despite going behind after three minutes, goals from Eden Hazard and Samuel Eto'o moved the Blues four points ahead of Liverpool and two points behind leaders Arsenal.

Position at the end of December
Pos	Team	Pld	W	D	L	GF	GA	GD	Pts
1	Arsenal	19	13	3	3	37	18	+19	42
2	Manchester City	19	13	2	4	44	11	+33	41
3	Chelsea	19	12	4	3	35	19	+16	40
4	Everton	19	10	7	2	31	18	+13	37
5	Liverpool	19	11	3	5	44	23	+21	36

=== January ===
Chelsea kicked off 2014 with an impressively comfortable 0–3 away victory against this season's surprise package Southampton. Southampton kept Chelsea at bay until midway through the second half, when Mourinho made a double substitution, taking André Schürrle and Juan Mata off for Willian and Oscar, the latter of whose deflected cross was tapped by Fernando Torres in the 60th minute, and later scored himself in the 82nd minute following a good strike by Willian.

Unbeknownst to all, this would be Juan Mata's final Chelsea appearance, reacting angrily to his substitution in the 53rd minute following a mostly poor season, spending most of it on the bench. Over the course of two-and-a-half seasons, Mata made 135 appearances for Chelsea, scoring 33 goals and winning both the Champions League and the Europa League alongside the FA Cup following a highly successful spell at the club, winning the Chelsea the Player of the Year award in two consecutive seasons.

Chelsea began their 2014 FA Cup campaign with a comfortable 2–0 win against second-tier side Derby County, managed by former England coach Steve McClaren. Victory came courtesy of a rare John Obi Mikel goal, scoring his second of the season despite not having scored since 2007 before his goal against Fulham in October, followed by an Oscar goal 20 minutes from time that sealed the win. On 11 January, Chelsea won their fourth consecutive league game at the KC Stadium with a 0–2 win over Hull City, with goals from Hazard and Torres.

Chelsea made it five league wins on the trot with an impressive 3–1 home win against Manchester United on 19 January, with a Samuel Eto'o hat-trick making the difference. Chelsea progressed to the fifth round of the FA Cup with a 1–0 victory over Stoke City, the winner being a superb Oscar free-kick in the first half. Chelsea, however, failed to complete a perfect January as they drew 0–0 to relegation candidates West Ham. Chelsea had 39 shots throughout the game yet failed to score, the first time since the 2003–04 Premier League season that this has happened.

On the final day of the January Transfer Window, Chelsea signed French youngster Kurt Zouma for a reported £12 million from Saint-Étienne. The defender was imminently loaned back to Saint-Étienne for the remainder of the season.

Position at the end of January
Pos	Team	Pld	W	D	L	GF	GA	GD	Pts
1	Manchester City	23	17	2	4	58	16	+42	53
2	Arsenal	23	16	4	3	45	21	+24	52
3	Chelsea	23	15	5	3	43	20	+23	50
4	Liverpool	23	14	4	5	57	28	+29	46
5	Tottenham Hotspur	23	13	4	6	30	31	−1	43

=== February ===
Chelsea became the first Premier League team to defeat Manchester City and the first team to stop them scoring at the City of Manchester Stadium all season as a Branislav Ivanović scored after 32 minutes. City had scored 42 goals in 11 games and had not fail to score at home since Birmingham City held them to a 0–0 draw in November 2010. Chelsea also became the first team to do the double over Manchester City since Everton in the 2010–11 season. The win moved Chelsea level on points with City, yet behind on goal difference, +41 to Chelsea's +24.

On 8 February, Chelsea defeated Newcastle United at Stamford Bridge, 3–0. Eden Hazard scored his first hat-trick for Chelsea, which also saw them go to the top of the table. Chelsea's good February form stuttered as they slipped up to a draw away to West Brom and being knocked out of the 2013–14 FA Cup to Manchester City.

Chelsea, however, ended February on a high, as a last minute Frank Lampard free-kick against Everton, 1–0, kept Chelsea top of the table. Additionally, Chelsea finished February in good form as they grabbed a 1–1 draw at 2013 Turkish Champions Galatasaray. Fernando Torres gave Chelsea a vital away goal, before an Aurélien Chedjou goal pulled the Turkish club back into it.

Position at the end of February
Pos	Team	Pld	W	D	L	GF	GA	GD	Pts
1	Chelsea	27	18	6	3	49	21	+28	60
2	Arsenal	27	18	5	4	52	27	+25	59
3	Manchester City	26	18	3	5	59	17	+42	57
4	Liverpool	27	17	5	5	70	35	+35	56
5	Tottenham Hotspur	27	15	5	7	36	33	+3	50

=== March ===
Chelsea started March by defeating West London rivals Fulham 1–3 away at Craven Cottage. In the match, André Schürrle grabbed a second-half hat-trick to move Chelsea four points ahead of both second-placed Liverpool and third-placed Arsenal.

One week later, Chelsea again triumphed in a London derby, defeating Tottenham 4–0 home. First, Samuel Eto'o capitalised on a mistake from Jan Vertonghen before Younès Kaboul fouled the Cameroonian and was subsequently sent off, conceding a penalty that Eden Hazard converted. Spurs played the last 30 minutes with ten men, and in the last five minutes, Demba Ba scored twice to triple his goal tally for the season. The win moved Chelsea seven points ahead of second place with the other teams behind having played fewer games.

Chelsea's 14 Premier League unbeaten run came to an end at Aston Villa in controversial fashion. Willian was sent off after two debatable yellow cards, before Fabian Delph scored a superb winner for the Villains. Ramires, however, was sent off for a poor foul on Karim El Ahmadi and Mourinho was subsequently sent to the stands for protesting the red card. Despite the loss, Chelsea still remained four points ahead of nearest rivals Liverpool in the standings.

Three days later, Chelsea became the first English team to progress in the Round of 16 in the Champions League by defeating Galatasaray at Stamford Bridge. An early goal from Samuel Eto'o and a goal two minutes before half time from Gary Cahill sent the Blues to the next round.

Chelsea finished March in disappointment, as they succumbed to defeat at Selhurst Park against Crystal Palace, 1–0. John Terry scored an unfortunate own goal after 52 minutes as Chelsea lost top spot for the first time since the beginning of February.

Position at the end of March
Pos	Team	Pld	W	D	L	GF	GA	GD	Pts	Qualification
2	Chelsea	32	21	6	5	62	24	+38	69	2014–15 UEFA Champions League group stage

=== April ===
Chelsea began April in poor fashion, as they lost 3–1 to Paris Saint-Germain at the Parc des Princes, leaving their 2013–14 Champions League hopes in the balance. Ezequiel Lavezzi gave PSG the lead after three minutes before Eden Hazard equalised from the penalty spot. An own goal from David Luiz, however, and a last minute goal from Javier Pastore will require of Chelsea to score a minimum of two goals at Stamford Bridge in the home leg.

Chelsea moved back to the top of the table as they defeated Stoke City at Stamford Bridge. Goals from new signing Mohamed Salah, Frank Lampard and Willian gave the Blues all three points. Lampard's goal was his 250th of his career, having scored 210 for Chelsea, 39 for West Ham and one for Swansea.

The second leg of the Champions League quarter-final ended in dramatic fashion, as a last minute goal from Demba Ba sent Chelsea through to the semi-finals at the expense of PSG. Eden Hazard limped off early and was replaced by André Schürrle, who subsequently scored from a long throw-in after 32 minutes before Demba Ba's late goal secured Mourinho's unbeaten record in the Champions League quarter-final stage.

Ba scored his second goal in two games as Chelsea edged past ten-men Swansea 0–1 at the Liberty Stadium.

Mourinho's superb unbeaten home record fell apart on 19 April as Sunderland defeated the Blues 1–2. Despite Samuel Eto'o's early goal, goals from Connor Wickham and a penalty from Fabio Borini left Chelsea five points behind league leaders Liverpool.

Despite a successful 0–0 draw at the Vicente Calderón to Atlético Madrid, major injuries to goalkeeper Petr Čech and captain John Terry meant that Chelsea would finish the season without their captain and second vice-captain.

Ramires was given a four-match suspension for violent conduct during the Sunderland defeat and will subsequently miss the remainder of the season, as well as the first game of the 2014–15 Premier League season.

Chelsea edged closer to Liverpool at the top of the table by defeating them 0–2 at Anfield. Demba Ba capitalised on a Steven Gerrard error to give the Blues the lead in first-half stoppage time before Fernando Torres broke away and set up Willian to send Chelsea two points behind Liverpool.

The Blues crashed out of the Champions League in the second leg of the semi-finals to Atlético, 1–3. Fernando Torres gave Chelsea the lead before goals from Adrián, Diego Costa and Arda Turan gave Mourinho a sixth defeat in eight Champions League semi-final appearances.

Position at the end of April
Pos	Team	Pld	W	D	L	GF	GA	GD	Pts	Qualification
2	Chelsea	36	24	6	6	69	26	+43	78	2014–15 UEFA Champions League group stage

=== May ===
Chelsea all but lost the 2013–14 Premier League title after drawing 0–0 to Norwich in their penultimate game of the season, and their final league season game at home.

Despite a trophyless season for the first team, the Chelsea Youth team won the 2013–14 FA Youth Cup. A late Dominic Solanke brace helped the young Blues come from 3–2 down to defeat Fulham 7–6 on aggregate and secure their third title in five years.

In the last league season game, Chelsea defeated already relegated Cardiff 1–2 at the Cardiff City Stadium, goals from André Schürrle and Fernando Torres helped the Blues come from behind to secure a third-place league finish.

Captain John Terry signed a new one-year with Chelsea, securing his services until the end of the 2014–15 Premier League season.

World Cup News

Chelsea left back Ashley Cole retired from international football as he was subsequently left out of the England squad for the 2014 World Cup in Brazil. He been capped 107 times for the Three Lions and has represented his nation at three World Cups. Frank Lampard and Gary Cahill, however, were both selected by Roy Hodgson for the England squad.

While Christian Atsu was called up for the 26-man provisional squad for Ghana and Cameroon captain Samuel Eto'o was also called up. Quartet David Luiz, Oscar, Ramires and Willian were selected for the Brazilian final 23 and midfielder André Schürrle was also selected for Germany, which would eventually won the tournament.

Position at the end of May
Pos	Team	Pld	W	D	L	GF	GA	GD	Pts	Qualification
3	Chelsea	38	25	7	6	71	27	+44	82	2014–15 UEFA Champions League group stage

== Club ==
=== Coaching staff ===
Position	Staff
Manager	(Portugal) José Mourinho
Assistant Manager	(England) Steve Holland
Assistant Manager	(Portugal) Silvino Louro
Assistant Manager	(Portugal) Rui Faria
Assistant Manager	(Portugal) José Morais
Technical Director	(Nigeria) Michael Emenalo
Goalkeeper Coach	(France) Christophe Lollichon
First Team Fitness Coach	(England) Chris Jones
Senior Opposition Scout	(England) Mick McGiven
Medical Director	(Spain) Paco Biosca
First Team Doctor	(Gibraltar) Eva Carneiro
Under 21 Team Manager	(England) Dermot Drummy
Youth Team Manager	(England) Adi Viveash
Academy Manager	(England) Neil Bath
Match Analyst	(England) James Melbourne

Source: Chelsea F.C.

=== Other information ===
Owner	(Russia) Roman Abramovich
Chairman	(United States) Bruce Buck
Chief Executive	(England) Ron Gourlay
Directors	(Russia) (Canada) Marina Granovskaia (Ukraine) (Canada) Eugene Tenenbaum
Ground (capacity and dimensions)	Stamford Bridge (41,623 / 103x67 metres)
Training Ground	Cobham Training Centre

Source: Chelsea F.C.

== First team squad ==
Updated on 23 March 2014.

Squad No.	Name	Nationality	Position(s)	Since	Date of birth (age)	Signed from	Games played	Goals scored
Goalkeepers
1	Petr Čech	(Czech Republic)	GK	2004	20 May 1982 (aged 31)	(France) Rennes	470	0
23	Mark Schwarzer	(Australia)	GK	2013	6 October 1972 (aged 41)	(England) Fulham	6	0
40	Henrique Hilário	(Portugal)	GK	2006	21 October 1975 (aged 38)	(Portugal) Nacional	39	0
46	Jamal Blackman	(England)	GK	2006	27 October 1993 (aged 20)	Chelsea Academy	0	0
Defenders
2	Branislav Ivanović	(Serbia)	RB / CB	2008	22 February 1984 (aged 30)	(Russia) Lokomotiv Moscow	257	25
3	Ashley Cole	(England)	LB	2006	20 December 1980 (aged 33)	(England) Arsenal	332	7
4	David Luiz	(Brazil)	CB / DM	2011	22 April 1987 (aged 27)	(Portugal) Benfica	136	12
24	Gary Cahill	(England)	CB	2012	19 December 1985 (aged 28)	(England) Bolton Wanderers	101	11
26	John Terry (C)	(England)	CB	1998	7 December 1980 (aged 33)	Chelsea Academy	609	58
27	Nathan Aké	(Netherlands)	CB / DM	2012	18 February 1995 (aged 19)	Chelsea Academy	6	0
28	César Azpilicueta	(Spain)	RB / LB	2012	28 August 1989 (aged 24)	(France) Marseille	79	1
33	Tomáš Kalas	(Czech Republic)	CB / RB	2010	15 May 1993 (aged 20)	(Czech Republic) Sigma Olomouc	2	0
Midfielders
7	Ramires	(Brazil)	CM / RM	2010	24 March 1987 (aged 27)	(Portugal) Benfica	179	26
8	Frank Lampard (VC)	(England)	CM / DM	2001	20 June 1978 (aged 35)	(England) West Ham United	639	208
11	Oscar	(Brazil)	AM / LW / RW	2012	9 September 1991 (aged 22)	(Brazil) Internacional	100	23
12	John Obi Mikel	(Nigeria)	DM / CM	2006	22 April 1987 (aged 27)	(Norway) Lyn	303	4
14	André Schürrle	(Germany)	RW / LW	2013	6 November 1990 (aged 23)	(Germany) Bayer Leverkusen	30	7
15	Mohamed Salah	(Egypt)	RW / LW	2014	15 June 1992 (aged 21)	(Switzerland) Basel	4	1
16	Marco van Ginkel	(Netherlands)	CM / AM	2013	1 December 1992 (aged 21)	(Netherlands) Vitesse	4	0
17	Eden Hazard	(Belgium)	AM / LW / RW	2012	7 January 1991 (aged 23)	(France) Lille	101	28
21	Nemanja Matić	(Serbia)	DM	2014	1 August 1988 (aged 25)	(Portugal) Benfica	13	0
22	Willian	(Brazil)	AM / LW / RW	2013	9 August 1988 (aged 25)	(Russia) Anzhi Makhachkala	30	2
Strikers
9	Fernando Torres	(Spain)	ST	2011	20 March 1984 (aged 30)	(England) Liverpool	160	44
19	Demba Ba	(Senegal)	ST	2013	25 May 1985 (aged 28)	(England) Newcastle United	41	9
29	Samuel Eto'o	(Cameroon)	ST	2013	10 March 1981 (aged 33)	(Russia) Anzhi Makhachkala	30	11

Source: Chelsea FC website

=== Premier League squad ===
Note: Flags indicate national team as defined under FIFA eligibility rules; some limited exceptions apply. Players may hold more than one non-FIFA nationality.

No.	Pos.	Nation	Player
1	GK	CZE	Petr Čech
2	DF	SRB	Branislav Ivanović
3	DF	ENG	Ashley Cole^{HG^{1}}
4	DF	BRA	David Luiz
7	MF	BRA	Ramires
8	MF	ENG	Frank Lampard^{HG^{1}}
9	FW	ESP	Fernando Torres
11	MF	BRA	Oscar
12	MF	NGR	John Obi Mikel
14	MF	GER	André Schürrle
15	MF	EGY	Mohamed Salah
16	MF	NED	Marco van Ginkel ^{U21}
17	MF	BEL	Eden Hazard

No.	Pos.	Nation	Player
19	FW	SEN	Demba Ba
21	MF	SRB	Nemanja Matić
22	MF	BRA	Willian
23	GK	AUS	Mark Schwarzer
24	DF	ENG	Gary Cahill ^{HG^{1}}
26	DF	ENG	John Terry ^{HG^{2}} (Captain)
27	DF	NED	Nathan Aké^{U21}
28	DF	ESP	César Azpilicueta
29	FW	CMR	Samuel Eto'o
33	DF	CZE	Tomáš Kalas^{U21}
40	GK	POR	Henrique Hilário
46	GK	ENG	Jamal Blackman^{U21}

- HG^{1} = Association-trained player
- HG^{2} = Club-trained player
- U21 = Under 21 Player

Source: 2013–14 Premier League Squad

=== UEFA Champions League squad ===
Note: Flags indicate national team as defined under FIFA eligibility rules; some limited exceptions apply. Players may hold more than one non-FIFA nationality.

No.	Pos.	Nation	Player
1	GK	CZE	Petr Čech
2	DF	SRB	Branislav Ivanović
3	DF	ENG	Ashley Cole ^{HG^{1}}
4	DF	BRA	David Luiz
7	MF	BRA	Ramires
8	MF	ENG	Frank Lampard ^{HG^{1}} (Vice-Captain)
9	FW	ESP	Fernando Torres
11	MF	BRA	Oscar
12	MF	NGR	John Obi Mikel
14	MF	GER	André Schürrle
16	MF	NED	Marco van Ginkel
17	MF	BEL	Eden Hazard

No.	Pos.	Nation	Player
19	FW	SEN	Demba Ba
22	MF	BRA	Willian
23	GK	AUS	Mark Schwarzer
24	DF	ENG	Gary Cahill ^{HG^{1}}
26	DF	ENG	John Terry ^{HG^{2}} (Captain)
28	DF	ESP	César Azpilicueta
29	FW	CMR	Samuel Eto'o
33	DF	CZE	Tomáš Kalas
40	GK	POR	Henrique Hilário
46	GK	ENG	Jamal Blackman ^{B}
48	GK	ENG	Mitchell Beeney ^{B}

- B = List B Player
- HG^{1} = Association-trained player
- HG^{2} = Club-trained player

Source: 2013–14 UEFA Champions League squad

== Transfers and loans ==
=== In ===
==== Summer ====
No.	Pos	Player	Transferred from	Fee	Date	Source
—	MF	(England) Kasey Palmer	(England) Charlton Athletic	Undisclosed	1 March 2013	
14	MF	(Germany) André Schürrle	(Germany) Bayer Leverkusen	£18.7 million	1 July 2013	
—	MF	(Ecuador) Josimar Quintero	(Spain) Barcelona	Undisclosed	1 July 2013	
16	MF	(Netherlands) Marco van Ginkel	(Netherlands) Vitesse	£8 million	5 July 2013	
—	FW	(England) Isaiah Brown	(England) West Bromwich Albion	Tribunal	8 July 2013	
23	GK	(Australia) Mark Schwarzer	(England) Fulham	Free transfer	9 July 2013	
—	DF	(Chile) Cristián Cuevas	(Chile) O'Higgins	£1.7 million	23 July 2013	
—	FW	(Croatia) Stipe Perica	(Croatia) Zadar	Undisclosed	1 August 2013	
22	MF	(Brazil) Willian	(Russia) Anzhi Makhachkala	£30 million	28 August 2013	
29	FW	(Cameroon) Samuel Eto'o	(Russia) Anzhi Makhachkala	£2 million	29 August 2013	
—	MF	(Ghana) Christian Atsu	(Portugal) Porto	£3.5 million	1 September 2013	

==== Winter ====
No.	Pos	Player	Transferred from	Fee	Date	Source
—	MF	(Burkina Faso) Bertrand Traoré	(Burkina Faso) Jeunes Espoirs	Undisclosed	1 January 2014	
21	MF	(Serbia) Nemanja Matić	(Portugal) Benfica	£21 million	15 January 2014	
15	MF	(Egypt) Mohamed Salah	(Switzerland) Basel	£11 million	26 January 2014	
—	DF	(France) Kurt Zouma	(France) Saint-Étienne	£12.5 million	31 January 2014	
—	MF	(Croatia) Mario Pašalić	(Croatia) Hajduk Split	Undisclosed	31 January 2014	

=== Out ===
==== Summer ====
No.	Pos	Player	Transferred To	Fee	Date	Source
72	MF	(Sierra Leone) Samuel Bangura	(England) Marlow	Released	30 June 2013	
—	FW	(England) Walter Figueira	(Greece) Platanias	Released	30 June 2013	
—	MF	(England) Tom Howard	(England) Merstham	Released	30 June 2013	
—	DF	(England) Nortei Nortey	(England) Maidenhead United	Released	30 June 2013	
—	MF	(England) Ismail Seremba	(United States) Akron Zips	Released	30 June 2013	
19	DF	(Portugal) Paulo Ferreira	Retired	Released	30 June 2013	
—	MF	(Sweden) Amin Affane	(Germany) Energie Cottbus	Free transfer	1 July 2013	
57	DF	(England) Archange Nkumu	(England) Concord Rangers	Free transfer	1 July 2013	
15	MF	(France) Florent Malouda	(Turkey) Trabzonspor	Free transfer	1 July 2013	
22	GK	(England) Ross Turnbull	(England) Doncaster Rovers	Free transfer	1 July 2013	
30	MF	(Israel) Yossi Benayoun	(England) Queens Park Rangers	Free transfer	1 July 2013	
49	DF	(Sierra Leone) Aziz Deen-Conteh	(Greece) Ergotelis	Free transfer	1 July 2013	
43	DF	(Netherlands) Jeffrey Bruma	(Netherlands) PSV	£2.5 million	13 July 2013	
—	MF	(England) Jesse Starkey	(England) Brighton & Hove Albion	Undisclosed	29 August 2013	
—	MF	(Sweden) Anjur Osmanović	(Sweden) Lärje-Angered IF	Free transfer	1 September 2013	
—	GK	(England) Ben Killip	(England) Norwich City	Free transfer	18 November 2013	

==== Winter ====
No.	Pos	Player	Transferred To	Fee	Date	Source
15	MF	(Belgium) Kevin De Bruyne	(Germany) VfL Wolfsburg	£16.5 million	18 January 2014	
52	GK	(England) Sam Walker	(England) Colchester United	Undisclosed	20 January 2014	
10	MF	(Spain) Juan Mata	(England) Manchester United	£37.1 million	25 January 2014	
5	MF	(Ghana) Michael Essien	(Italy) Milan	Free transfer	27 January 2014	
—	DF	(Burundi) Jonathan Muleba	(England) AFC Bournemouth	Undisclosed	30 January 2014	
48	MF	(Belgium) Lamisha Musonda	(Belgium) Mechelen	Free transfer	30 January 2014	

=== Loan out ===
==== Summer ====
Squad Number	Position	Player	Loaned To	Start	End	Source
—	GK	(Belgium) Thibaut Courtois	(Spain) Atlético Madrid	22 June 2013	30 June 2014	
54	DF	(England) Todd Kane	(England) Blackburn Rovers	25 June 2013	30 June 2014	
—	MF	(Germany) Marko Marin	(Spain) Sevilla	28 June 2013	30 June 2014	
56	MF	(England) George Saville	(England) Brentford	28 June 2013	30 June 2014	
36	FW	(England) Patrick Bamford	(England) Milton Keynes Dons	28 June 2013	5 January 2014	
—	GK	(Croatia) Matej Delac	(Serbia) Vojvodina	8 July 2013	30 June 2014	
6	MF	(Spain) Oriol Romeu	(Spain) Valencia	12 July 2013	30 June 2014	
64	FW	(Slovakia) Milan Lalkovič	(England) Walsall	16 July 2013	30 June 2014	
38	DF	(Netherlands) Patrick van Aanholt	(Netherlands) Vitesse	24 July 2013	30 June 2014	
—	MF	(Belgium) Thorgan Hazard	(Belgium) Zulte Waregem	24 July 2013	30 June 2014	
—	DF	(Chile) Cristián Cuevas	(Netherlands) Vitesse	7 August 2013	30 June 2014	
—	FW	(Uruguay) Jhon Pírez	(Spain) Leganés	9 August 2013	30 June 2014	
30	MF	(Brazil) Lucas Piazon	(Netherlands) Vitesse	9 August 2013	30 June 2014	
32	DF	(Brazil) Wallace	(Italy) Inter Milan	13 August 2013	30 June 2014	
—	FW	(Croatia) Stipe Perica	(Netherlands) NAC Breda	19 August 2013	30 June 2014	
—	MF	(Ghana) Christian Atsu	(Netherlands) Vitesse	1 September 2013	30 June 2014	
13	MF	(Nigeria) Victor Moses	(England) Liverpool	2 September 2013	30 June 2014	
—	MF	(Mexico) Ulises Dávila	(Spain) Córdoba	2 September 2013	30 June 2014	
18	FW	(Belgium) Romelu Lukaku	(England) Everton	2 September 2013	30 June 2014	
45	MF	(England) Nathaniel Chalobah	(England) Nottingham Forest	19 September 2013	15 January 2014	

==== Winter ====
Squad Number	Position	Player	Loaned To	Start	End	Source
37	MF	(Burkina Faso) Bertrand Traoré	(Netherlands) Vitesse	2 January 2014	30 June 2014	
36	FW	(England) Patrick Bamford	(England) Derby County	5 January 2014	30 June 2014	
59	DF	(Nigeria) Kenneth Omeruo	(England) Middlesbrough	6 January 2014	30 June 2014	
45	MF	(England) Nathaniel Chalobah	(England) Middlesbrough	16 January 2014	30 June 2014	
34	DF	(England) Ryan Bertrand	(England) Aston Villa	17 January 2014	30 June 2014	
20	MF	(England) Josh McEachran	(England) Wigan Athletic	23 January 2014	30 June 2014	
—	GK	(Croatia) Matej Delac	(Bosnia and Herzegovina) Sarajevo	29 January 2014	30 June 2014	
47	MF	(England) Billy Clifford	(Belgium) Royal Antwerp	30 January 2014	30 June 2014	
—	DF	(France) Kurt Zouma	(France) Saint-Étienne	31 January 2014	30 June 2014	
31	FW	(France) Gaël Kakuta	(Italy) Lazio	31 January 2014	30 June 2014	

=== Overall transfer activity ===
==== Total Spending ====
Summer: ▼£63,900,000

Winter: ▼£44,500,000

Total: ▼£108,400,000

==== Income ====
Summer: ▲£2,500,000

Winter: ▲£53,600,000

Total: ▲£56,100,000

==== Expenditure ====
Summer: ▼£61,400,000

Winter: ▲£9,100,000

Total: ▼£52,300,000

== Pre-season ==
=== Friendlies ===
17 July 2013 Friendly	Singha All-Stars (Thailand)	0–1	(England) Chelsea	Bangkok, Thailand
20:00 UTC+07:00	Hussein (yellow card) 60'	Report	Lukaku 34' (pen.)	Stadium: Rajamangala Stadium; Attendance: 41,000; Referee: Sivakorn Pu-udom (Thailand)

21 July 2013 Friendly	Malaysia XI	1–4	(England) Chelsea	Shah Alam, Malaysia
21:45 UTC+08:00	Fadhli 90+1'	Report	Traoré 6'; De Bruyne 29'; Lukaku 45+4'; Moses 89'	Stadium: Shah Alam Stadium; Attendance: 41,500; Referee: Nagor Amir Bin Noor Mohamed (Malaysia)

25 July 2013 Friendly	BNI Indonesia All-Stars	1–8	(England) Chelsea	Jakarta, Indonesia
20:30 UTC+07:00	Kalas 69' (o.g.); Gatra (yellow card) 75'	Report	Hazard 22' (pen.); Ramires 30', 57'; Ba 32'; Terry 45+1'; Traoré 51'; Lukaku 52', 66'	Stadium: Gelora Bung Karno Stadium; Attendance: 80,106; Referee: Chaiya Mahapab (Thailand)

11 August 2013 Friendly	Chelsea (England)	2–1	(Italy) Roma	Washington, D.C., United States
20:00 EDT	Lampard 61'; Lukaku 89'	Report	Lamela 21'	Stadium: RFK Stadium; Attendance: 45,615; Referee: Armando Villarreal (United States)

=== International Champions Cup ===
1 August 2013 Round 1	Chelsea (England)	2–0	(Italy) Internazionale	Indianapolis, United States
20:00 EDT	Oscar 13'; Hazard 29' (pen.), (yellow card) 54'; Ivanović (yellow card) 42'; Ramires (yellow card) 75'	Report	Guarín (yellow card) 28'; Cambiasso (yellow card) 44'; Campagnaro (red card) 58'	Stadium: Lucas Oil Stadium; Attendance: 41,983; Referee: Ismail Elfath (United States)

4 August 2013 Round 2	Milan (Italy)	0–2	(England) Chelsea	New York City, United States
19:30 EDT	Antonini (yellow card) 41'; Silvestre (yellow card) 67'	Report	Ivanović (yellow card) 18'; De Bruyne 29'; Schürrle 90+2'	Stadium: MetLife Stadium; Attendance: 39,764; Referee: Jose Carlos Rivera (United States)

7 August 2013 Final	Real Madrid (Spain)	3–1	(England) Chelsea	Miami Gardens, United States
22:00 EDT	Marcelo 14'; Ronaldo 31', 57'; Arbeloa (yellow card) 43'	Report	Ramires 16'; Lampard (yellow card) 37'; Cahill (yellow card) 58'	Stadium: Sun Life Stadium; Attendance: 67,273; Referee: Edvin Jurisevic (United States)

== Competitions ==
Competition	Started round	Current position / round	Final position / round	First match	Last match
Premier League	—	—	3rd	18 August 2013	11 May 2014
FA Cup	3rd round	—	5th round	5 January 2014	15 February 2014
League Cup	3rd round	—	5th round	24 September 2013	17 December 2013
UEFA Champions League	Group stage	—	Semi-finals	18 September 2013	30 April 2014
UEFA Super Cup	Final	—	Runners-up	30 August 2013	

Updated to match played 11 May 2014
Source: Competitions

=== UEFA Super Cup ===
30 August 2013 Final	Bayern Munich (Germany)	2–2 (a.e.t.) (5–4 p)	(England) Chelsea	Prague, Czech Republic
20:45 CEST	Ribéry (yellow card) 23' (goal) 48'; Boateng (yellow card) 84'; Martínez 120+1'	Report	Torres 8' (yellow card) 89'; Cahill (yellow card) 42'; Ramires (yellow card) 64' (yellow-red card) 85'; David Luiz (yellow card) 66'; Hazard 93'; Lukaku (yellow card) 99'; Cole (yellow card) 118'; Ivanović (yellow card) 120'	Stadium: Eden Arena; Attendance: 17,686; Referee: Jonas Eriksson
	Penalties
	Alaba (penalty scored); Kroos (penalty scored); Lahm (penalty scored); Ribéry (penalty scored); Shaqiri (penalty scored)		(penalty scored) David Luiz; (penalty scored) Oscar; (penalty scored) Lampard; (penalty scored) Cole; (penalty missed) Lukaku

=== Premier League ===
==== League table ====
Pos	Team	Pld	W	D	L	GF	GA	GD	Pts	Qualification or relegation
1	Manchester City (C)	38	27	5	6	102	37	+65	86	Qualification for the Champions League group stage
2	Liverpool	38	26	6	6	101	50	+51	84	Qualification for the Champions League group stage
3	Chelsea	38	25	7	6	71	27	+44	82	Qualification for the Champions League group stage
4	Arsenal	38	24	7	7	68	41	+27	79	Qualification for the Champions League play-off round
5	Everton	38	21	9	8	61	39	+22	72	Qualification for the Europa League group stage

Source: Barclays Premier League
Rules for classification: 1) Points; 2) Goal difference; 3) Goals scored; 4) Play-offs (only if needed to decide champion, teams for relegation or teams for UEFA competitions).
(C) Champions

==== Results summary ====
Overall								Home						Away					
Pld	W	D	L	GF	GA	GD	Pts	W	D	L	GF	GA	GD	W	D	L	GF	GA	GD
38	25	7	6	71	27	+44	82	15	3	1	43	11	+32	10	4	5	28	16	+12

Last updated: 11 May 2014.
Source: Competitive matches

==== Results by matchday ====
Matchday	1	2	3	4	5	6	7	8	9	10	11	12	13	14	15	16	17	18	19	20	21	22	23	24	25	26	27	28	29	30	31	32	33	34	35	36	37	38
Ground	H	H	A	A	H	A	A	H	H	A	H	A	H	A	A	H	A	H	H	A	A	H	H	A	H	A	H	A	H	A	H	A	H	A	H	A	H	A
Result	W	W	D	L	W	D	W	W	W	L	D	W	W	W	L	W	D	W	W	W	W	W	D	W	W	D	W	W	W	L	W	L	W	W	L	W	D	W
Position	3	1	2	6	2	3	3	2	2	2	4	3	2	2	3	2	4	3	3	3	1	3	3	3	1	1	1	1	1	1	1	1	1	2	2	2	3	3
Points	3	6	7	7	10	11	14	17	20	20	21	24	27	30	30	33	34	37	40	43	46	49	50	53	56	57	60	63	66	66	69	69	72	75	75	78	79	82

Updated to match(es) played on 11 May 2014. Source: Statto.com
A = Away; H = Home; W = Win; D = Draw; L = Loss

==== Matches ====
18 August 2013 1	Chelsea	2–0	Hull City	London
16:00 BST	Oscar 13'; Lampard 25'	Report	Meyler (yellow card) 40'	Stadium: Stamford Bridge; Attendance: 41,374; Referee: Jonathan Moss

21 August 2013 2	Chelsea	2–1	Aston Villa	London
19:45 BST	Luna 6' (o.g.); Ivanović (yellow card) 71', (goal) 73'	Report	Benteke 45+3' (yellow card) 76'; El Ahmadi (yellow card) 65'; Westwood (yellow card) 72'; Guzan (yellow card) 90+3'	Stadium: Stamford Bridge; Attendance: 41,527; Referee: Kevin Friend

26 August 2013 3	Manchester United	0–0	Chelsea	Manchester
20:00 BST		Report	De Bruyne (yellow card) 32'; Torres (yellow card) 80'	Stadium: Old Trafford; Attendance: 75,032; Referee: Martin Atkinson

14 September 2013 4	Everton	1–0	Chelsea	Liverpool
17:30 BST	Naismith 45+1'	Report	Ivanović (yellow card) 65'; Hazard (yellow card) 79'; David Luiz (yellow card) 82'; Mikel (yellow card) 86'	Stadium: Goodison Park; Attendance: 36,034; Referee: Howard Webb

21 September 2013 5	Chelsea	2–0	Fulham	London
17:30 BST	Oscar 52'; Mikel 84'	Report		Stadium: Stamford Bridge; Attendance: 41,608; Referee: Andre Marriner

28 September 2013 6	Tottenham Hotspur	1–1	Chelsea	London
12:45 BST	Sigurðsson 19'; Townsend (yellow card) 43'; Eriksen (yellow card) 45+2'; Vertonghen (yellow card) 64'; Dawson (yellow card) 75'; Dembélé (yellow card) 78'	Report	Torres (yellow card) 51' (yellow-red card) 81'; Ivanović (yellow card) 57'; Terry 65'	Stadium: White Hart Lane; Attendance: 35,857; Referee: Mike Dean

6 October 2013 7	Norwich City	1–3	Chelsea	Norwich
13:30 BST	Pilkington 68'; Tettey (yellow card) 69'	Report	Oscar 4', (yellow card) 62'; Hazard 85'; Willian 86'	Stadium: Carrow Road; Attendance: 26,840; Referee: Neil Swarbrick

19 October 2013 8	Chelsea	4–1	Cardiff City	London
15:00 BST	Hazard 33', 82'; David Luiz (yellow card) 40'; Eto'o 66'; Oscar 78'	Report	Mutch 10'; Cowie (yellow card) 45'; Marshall (yellow card) 54'	Stadium: Stamford Bridge; Attendance: 41,475; Referee: Anthony Taylor

27 October 2013 9	Chelsea	2–1	Manchester City	London
16:00 GMT	Schürrle 33'; Lampard (yellow card) 22'; Ramires (yellow card) 51'; Torres 90'	Report	Zabaleta (yellow card) 27'; Nastasić (yellow card) 31'; Agüero 49'; García (yellow card) 60'	Stadium: Stamford Bridge; Attendance: 41,495; Referee: Howard Webb

2 November 2013 10	Newcastle United	2–0	Chelsea	Newcastle upon Tyne
12:45 GMT	Sissoko (yellow card) 41'; Gouffran 68'; Rémy 88', (yellow card) 89'	Report	David Luiz (yellow card) 74'; Ramires (yellow card) 77'	Stadium: St James' Park; Attendance: 51,674; Referee: Lee Mason

9 November 2013 11	Chelsea	2–2	West Bromwich Albion	London
15:00 GMT	Lampard (yellow card) 15'; Eto'o 45', (yellow card) 45'; Hazard 90+5' (pen.); Ivanović (yellow card) 90+7'	Report	Yacob (yellow card) 28'; Long (yellow card) 45+3', (goal) 60'; Sessègnon 68'; Amalfitano (yellow card) 83'; Brunt (yellow card) 90+5'; McAuley (yellow card) 90+5'; Ridgewell (yellow card) 90+5'; Olsson (yellow card) 90+7'	Stadium: Stamford Bridge; Attendance: 41,623; Referee: Andre Marriner

23 November 2013 12	West Ham United	0–3	Chelsea	London
17:30 GMT		Report	Lampard 21' (pen.), 83'; Oscar 34'	Stadium: Boleyn Ground; Attendance: 34,977; Referee: Chris Foy

1 December 2013 13	Chelsea	3–1	Southampton	London
16:10 GMT	Essien (yellow card) 32'; Cahill 55'; Terry 62'; Ba 90'	Report	Rodriguez 1', (yellow card) 71'; Lallana (yellow card) 52'; Schneiderlin (yellow card) 64'; Osvaldo (yellow card) 85'	Stadium: Stamford Bridge; Attendance: 41,568; Referee: Michael Oliver

4 December 2013 14	Sunderland	3–4	Chelsea	Sunderland
19:45 GMT	Altidore 14', (yellow card) 90+5'; Dossena (yellow card) 39'; O'Shea 50'; Colback (yellow card) 50'; Bardsley (yellow card) 45+1', (goal) 86'	Report	Lampard 17'; Hazard 36', 62', (yellow card) 62'; Ramires (yellow card) 47'; Bardsley 84' (o.g.); Willian (yellow card) 89'	Stadium: Stadium of Light; Attendance: 40,652; Referee: Phil Dowd

7 December 2013 15	Stoke City	3–2	Chelsea	Stoke-on-Trent
15:00 GMT	Crouch 42', (yellow card) 80'; Ireland 50', (yellow card) 90'; Walters (yellow card) 82'; Assaidi 90', (yellow card) 90'	Report	Schürrle 9', 52'; Terry (yellow card) 85'	Stadium: Britannia Stadium; Attendance: 25,154; Referee: Jonathan Moss

14 December 2013 16	Chelsea	2–1	Crystal Palace	London
15:00 GMT	Torres 16'; Ramires 35'; Essien (yellow card) 58'; Ivanović (yellow card) 69'	Report	Chamakh 29', (yellow card) 43'	Stadium: Stamford Bridge; Attendance: 41,608; Referee: Mark Clattenburg

23 December 2013 17	Arsenal	0–0	Chelsea	London
20:00 GMT	Walcott (yellow card) 65'; Rosický (yellow card) 70'	Report	Ramires (yellow card) 63'	Stadium: Emirates Stadium; Attendance: 60,039; Referee: Mike Dean

26 December 2013 18	Chelsea	1–0	Swansea City	London
15:00 GMT	Hazard 29'; Ramires (yellow card) 86'	Report	Amat (yellow card) 86'	Stadium: Stamford Bridge; Attendance: 41,111; Referee: Mike Jones

29 December 2013 19	Chelsea	2–1	Liverpool	London
16:00 GMT	Hazard 17'; Eto'o 34'; Terry (yellow card) 47'; David Luiz (yellow card) 49'; Cahill (yellow card) 79'; Oscar (yellow card) 90+4'	Report	Škrtel 4'; Johnson (yellow card) 40'	Stadium: Stamford Bridge; Attendance: 41,614; Referee: Howard Webb

1 January 2014 20	Southampton	0–3	Chelsea	Southampton
15:00 GMT	Ramírez (yellow card) 46'; Cork (yellow card) 52'; Lovren (yellow card) 63'	Report	Torres 60'; Willian 71'; Oscar (yellow card) 55', (goal) 82'	Stadium: St Mary's Stadium; Attendance: 31,271; Referee: Martin Atkinson

11 January 2014 21	Hull City	0–2	Chelsea	Hull
12:45 GMT	Livermore (yellow card) 69'; Figueroa (yellow card) 81'	Report	Hazard 56'; Cahill (yellow card) 65'; Torres 87'	Stadium: KC Stadium; Attendance: 24,924; Referee: Mark Clattenburg

19 January 2014 22	Chelsea	3–1	Manchester United	London
16:00 GMT	Eto'o 17', 45', 49'; David Luiz (yellow card) 19'	Report	Young (yellow card) 35'; Valencia (yellow card) 55'; Hernández 78'; Vidić (red card) 90+1'; Rafael (yellow card) 90+5'	Stadium: Stamford Bridge; Attendance: 41,615; Referee: Phil Dowd

29 January 2014 23	Chelsea	0–0	West Ham United	London
19:45 GMT	Ramires (yellow card) 84'	Report	O'Brien (yellow card) 58'; Taylor (yellow card) 60'; Nolan (yellow card) 74'	Stadium: Stamford Bridge; Attendance: 41,376; Referee: Neil Swarbrick

3 February 2014 24	Manchester City	0–1	Chelsea	Manchester
20:00 GMT	Demichelis (yellow card) 37'; Kolarov (yellow card) 42'; Nastasić (yellow card) 87'	Report	Ivanović 32', (yellow card) 33'; Matić (yellow card) 40'; Willian (yellow card) 90+2'	Stadium: City of Manchester Stadium; Attendance: 47,364; Referee: Mike Dean

8 February 2014 25	Chelsea	3–0	Newcastle United	London
15:00 GMT	Hazard 27', 34', 63' (pen.)	Report	Sa. Ameobi (yellow card) 49'; Yanga-Mbiwa (yellow card) 61'; Sissoko (yellow card) 90'	Stadium: Stamford Bridge; Attendance: 41,387; Referee: Howard Webb

11 February 2014 26	West Bromwich Albion	1–1	Chelsea	West Bromwich
20:00 GMT	Amalfitano (yellow card) 41'; Yacob (yellow card) 50'; Anichebe 87', (yellow card) 88'	Report	Ivanović 45+3', (yellow card) 76'; Willian (yellow card) 67'; David Luiz (yellow card) 81'; Matić (yellow card) 89'	Stadium: The Hawthorns; Attendance: 24,327; Referee: Anthony Taylor

22 February 2014 27	Chelsea	1–0	Everton	London
12:45 GMT	Oscar (yellow card) 9'; Lampard 90+3'	Report	Barry (yellow card) 82'; Jagielka (yellow card) 90+2'	Stadium: Stamford Bridge; Attendance: 41,580; Referee: Lee Probert

1 March 2014 28	Fulham	1–3	Chelsea	London
15:00 GMT	Dejagah (yellow card) 35'; Kasami (yellow card) 48'; Heitinga 74'	Report	Ramires (yellow card) 50'; Schürrle 52', 65', 68'	Stadium: Craven Cottage; Attendance: 24,577; Referee: Mark Clattenburg

8 March 2014 29	Chelsea	4–0	Tottenham Hotspur	London
17:30 GMT	Lampard (yellow card) 40'; Eto'o 56'; Hazard 60' (pen.); Azpilicueta (yellow card) 86'; Ba 88', 89'	Report	Bentaleb (yellow card) 9'; Naughton (yellow card) 53'; Sandro (yellow card) 54'; Kaboul (red card) 59'	Stadium: Stamford Bridge; Attendance: 41,598; Referee: Michael Oliver

15 March 2014 30	Aston Villa	1–0	Chelsea	Birmingham
17:30 GMT	Baker (yellow card) 5'; Bennett (yellow card) 45'; Benteke (yellow card) 67'; Vlaar (yellow card) 77'; Delph 82'	Report	Willian (yellow card) 25' (yellow-red card) 68'; Ramires (yellow card) 90', (red card) 90+4'	Stadium: Villa Park; Attendance: 40,084; Referee: Chris Foy

22 March 2014 31	Chelsea	6–0	Arsenal	London
12:45 GMT	Eto'o 5'; Schürrle 7'; Hazard 17' (pen.); Oscar 42', 66'; Salah 71'	Report	Gibbs (red card) 15'; Rosický (yellow card) 52'	Stadium: Stamford Bridge; Attendance: 41,614; Referee: Andre Marriner

29 March 2014 32	Crystal Palace	1–0	Chelsea	London
15:00 GMT	Bolasie (yellow card) 13'; Puncheon (yellow card) 20'; Terry 52' (o.g.); Dann (yellow card) 77'; Mariappa (yellow card) 90'	Report	Terry (yellow card) 32'	Stadium: Selhurst Park; Attendance: 25,166; Referee: Lee Mason

5 April 2014 33	Chelsea	3–0	Stoke City	London
17:30 GMT	Salah 32'; Lampard (penalty missed) 61', 61'; Willian 72'	Report		Stadium: Stamford Bridge; Attendance: 41,168; Referee: Lee Probert

13 April 2014 34	Swansea City	0–1	Chelsea	Swansea
16:07 GMT	Flores (yellow card) 14' (yellow-red card) 16'	Report	Schürrle (yellow card) 45'; Ba 68'; Mikel (yellow card) 86'	Stadium: Liberty Stadium; Attendance: 20,761; Referee: Phil Dowd

19 April 2014 35	Chelsea	1–2	Sunderland	London
17:30 GMT	Eto'o 12'; Torres (yellow card) 90+2'	Report	Wickham 18'; Cattermole (yellow card) 56'; Brown (yellow card) 73'; Borini 82' (pen.)	Stadium: Stamford Bridge; Attendance: 41,210; Referee: Mike Dean

27 April 2014 36	Liverpool	0–2	Chelsea	Liverpool
14:05 GMT		Report	Salah (yellow card) 21'; Lampard (yellow card) 43'; Ba 45+3'; Cole (yellow card) 90+3'; Torres (yellow card) 90+3'; Willian 90+4'	Stadium: Anfield; Attendance: 44,726; Referee: Martin Atkinson

4 May 2014 37	Chelsea	0–0	Norwich City	London
16:00 GMT	Ivanović (yellow card) 57'	Report	Bennett (yellow card) 60'; Turner (yellow card) 87'; Olsson (yellow card) 90+3'	Stadium: Stamford Bridge; Attendance: 41,602; Referee: Neil Swarbrick

11 May 2014 38	Cardiff City	1–2	Chelsea	Cardiff
15:00 GMT	Azpilicueta 15' (o.g.); Whittingham (yellow card) 51'	Report	Mikel (yellow card) 33'; Schürrle 72'; Torres 75'; Matić (yellow card) 88'	Stadium: Cardiff City Stadium; Attendance: 27,716; Referee: Michael Oliver

=== FA Cup ===
5 January 2014 Third round	Derby County	0–2	Chelsea	Derby
14:15 GMT	Eustace (yellow card) 30'; Hughes (yellow card) 60'	Report	Mikel 66'; Ramires (yellow card) 69'; Oscar 71'	Stadium: Pride Park; Attendance: 32,110; Referee: Andre Marriner

26 January 2014 Fourth round	Chelsea	1–0	Stoke City	London
15:30 GMT	Oscar 27'	Report	Cameron (yellow card) 32'; Wilson (yellow card) 45+1'; Pieters (yellow card) 83'	Stadium: Stamford Bridge; Attendance: 40,845; Referee: Chris Foy

15 February 2014 Fifth round	Manchester City	2–0	Chelsea	Manchester
17:15 GMT	Jovetić 16', (yellow card) 57'; Kompany (yellow card) 39'; Touré (yellow card) 62'; Nasri 67'; García (yellow card) 84'	Report	David Luiz (yellow card) 44'; Matić (yellow card) 89'	Stadium: City of Manchester Stadium; Attendance: 47,013; Referee: Phil Dowd

=== League Cup ===
24 September 2013 Third round	Swindon Town	0–2	Chelsea	Swindon
19:45 BST	Thompson (yellow card) 77'	Report	Torres 29'; Ramires 35'; Azpilicueta (yellow card) 43'; Essien (yellow card) 53'	Stadium: County Ground; Attendance: 14,924; Referee: Michael Oliver

29 October 2013 Fourth round	Arsenal	0–2	Chelsea	London
19:45 GMT		Report	Azpilicueta 25'; Mikel (yellow card) 29'; Mata 66'; Essien (yellow card) 75'	Stadium: Emirates Stadium; Attendance: 59,455; Referee: Phil Dowd

17 December 2013 Fifth round	Sunderland	2–1 (a.e.t.)	Chelsea	Sunderland
19:45 GMT	Dossena (yellow card) 28'; Borini 88'; Ki 118', (yellow card) 119'	Report	David Luiz (yellow card) 25'; Lampard 46'; Essien (yellow card) 110'	Stadium: Stadium of Light; Attendance: 20,731; Referee: Anthony Taylor

=== UEFA Champions League ===
==== Group stage ====
Pos	Team	Pld	W	D	L	GF	GA	GD	Pts	Qualification	CHE	SCH	BSL	STE
1	(England) Chelsea	6	4	0	2	12	3	+9	12	Advance to knockout phase	—	3–0	1–2	1–0
2	(Germany) Schalke 04	6	3	1	2	6	6	0	10	Advance to knockout phase	0–3	—	2–0	3–0
3	(Switzerland) Basel	6	2	2	2	5	6	−1	8	Transfer to Europa League	1–0	0–1	—	1–1
4	(Romania) Steaua București	6	0	3	3	2	10	−8	3		0–4	0–0	1–1	—

Source: UEFA

18 September 2013 1	Chelsea (England)	1–2	(Switzerland) Basel	London, England
19:45 BST	Van Ginkel (yellow card) 42'; Oscar 45'	Report	Díaz (yellow card) 64'; Salah 71'; Streller 81'	Stadium: Stamford Bridge; Attendance: 38,000; Referee: Daniele Orsato (Italy)

1 October 2013 2	Steaua București (Romania)	0–4	(England) Chelsea	Bucharest, Romania
21:45 EEST		Report	Ramires 20', 55'; Lampard (yellow card) 33', (goal) 90'; Georgievski 44' (o.g.); Cole (yellow card) 50'	Stadium: National Arena; Attendance: 36,713; Referee: Carlos Velasco Carballo (Spain)

22 October 2013 3	Schalke 04 (Germany)	0–3	(England) Chelsea	Gelsenkirchen, Germany
19:45 BST	Jones (yellow card) 48'; Neustädter (yellow card) 67'	Report	Torres 5', 68'; Cahill (yellow card) 54'; Hazard 87'	Stadium: Veltins-Arena; Attendance: 54,442; Referee: Viktor Kassai (Hungary)

6 November 2013 4	Chelsea (England)	3–0	(Germany) Schalke 04	London, England
19:45 GMT	Eto'o 31', 54'; Ba 83'	Report	Draxler (yellow card) 19'; Jones (yellow card) 72'; Uchida (yellow card) 76'	Stadium: Stamford Bridge; Attendance: 41,194; Referee: Svein Oddvar Moen (Norway)

26 November 2013 5	Basel (Switzerland)	1–0	(England) Chelsea	Basel, Switzerland
19:45 GMT	Xhaka (yellow card) 37'; Dié (yellow card) 63'; Salah 87'	Report	Mikel (yellow card) 65'; Ramires (yellow card) 76'	Stadium: St. Jakob-Park; Attendance: 35,208; Referee: Stéphane Lannoy (France)

11 December 2013 6	Chelsea (England)	1–0	(Romania) Steaua București	London, England
19:45 GMT	Ba 10'; Mikel (yellow card) 20'; Ivanović (yellow card) 48'	Report	Georgievski (yellow card) 51'; Latovlevici (yellow card) 78'	Stadium: Stamford Bridge; Attendance: 41,181; Referee: Gianluca Rocchi (Italy)

==== Knockout phase ====
===== Round of 16 =====
26 February 2014 First leg	Galatasaray (Turkey)	1–1	(England) Chelsea	Istanbul, Turkey
19:45 GMT	Selçuk (yellow card) 57'; Chedjou 64'	Report	Torres 9'; Terry (yellow card) 42'; Schürrle (yellow card) 57'; Ramires (yellow card) 58'; Čech (yellow card) 61'	Stadium: Türk Telekom Arena; Attendance: 49,194; Referee: Carlos Velasco Carballo (Spain)

18 March 2014 Second leg	Chelsea (England)	2–0 (3–1 agg.)	(Turkey) Galatasaray	London, England
19:45 GMT	Eto'o 4'; Oscar (yellow card) 40'; Cahill 42'; Ivanović (yellow card) 58'	Report	Melo (yellow card) 19'; Drogba (yellow card) 67'; İnan (yellow card) 90+1'	Stadium: Stamford Bridge; Attendance: 38,038; Referee: Felix Brych (Germany)

===== Quarter-finals =====
2 April 2014 First leg	Paris Saint-Germain (France)	3–1	(England) Chelsea	Paris, France
19:45 GMT	Lavezzi 3'; Alex (yellow card) 20'; David Luiz 61' (o.g.); Motta (yellow card) 82'; Cavani (yellow card) 86'; Pastore 90+3'	Report	Ramires (yellow card) 12'; Hazard 27' (pen.); Willian (yellow card) 32'; David Luiz (yellow card) 86'	Stadium: Parc des Princes; Attendance: 45,517; Referee: Milorad Mažić (Serbia)

8 April 2014 Second leg	Chelsea (England)	2–0 (3a–3 agg.)	(France) Paris Saint-Germain	London, England
19:45 GMT	Willian (yellow card) 23'; Schürrle 32'; Lampard (yellow card) 41'; Ivanović (yellow card) 55'; David Luiz (yellow card) 82'; Ba 87'	Report	Verratti (yellow card) 27'; Cavani (yellow card) 40'; Moura (yellow card) 52'; Maxwell (yellow card) 79'	Stadium: Stamford Bridge; Attendance: 38,080; Referee: Pedro Proença (Portugal)

===== Semi-finals =====
22 April 2014 First leg	Atlético Madrid (Spain)	0–0	(England) Chelsea	Madrid, Spain
19:45 GMT	Gabi (yellow card) 74'; Miranda (yellow card) 88'	Report	Lampard (yellow card) 63'; Mikel (yellow card) 74'; Ba (yellow card) 90+4'	Stadium: Vicente Calderón; Attendance: 52,560; Referee: Jonas Eriksson (Sweden)

30 April 2014 Second leg	Chelsea (England)	1–3 (1–3 agg.)	(Spain) Atlético Madrid	London, England
19:45 GMT	Cahill (yellow card) 31'; Torres 32'	Report	Adrián 44', (yellow card) 65'; Costa (yellow card) 57', (goal) 60' (pen.); Turan 72'	Stadium: Stamford Bridge; Attendance: 37,918; Referee: Nicola Rizzoli (Italy)

== Statistics ==
=== Appearances ===
Last updated on 11 May. The list is sorted by shirt number when total appearances are equal.

Rnk	Pos	No.	Player	Premier League	FA Cup	League Cup	Champions League	Super Cup	Total
1	DF	2	(Serbia) Ivanović	36	2	0	11	1	50
2	MF	17	(Belgium) Hazard	35	3	1	9	1	49
3	MF	11	(Brazil) Oscar	33	3	0	10	1	47
3	DF	26	(England) Terry	34	0	1	11	1	47
5	GK	1	(Czech Republic) Čech	34	1	0	10	1	46
5	MF	7	(Brazil) Ramires	30	3	2	10	1	46
5	DF	24	(England) Cahill	29	3	3	10	1	46
8	DF	28	(Spain) Azpilicueta	29	2	3	10	0	44
9	MF	14	(Germany) Schürrle	30	1	1	10	1	43
10	MF	22	(Brazil) Willian	25	3	3	11	0	42
11	FW	9	(Spain) Torres	28	2	1	9	1	41
12	MF	8	(England) Lampard	26	1	1	11	1	40
13	MF	12	(Nigeria) Mikel	24	2	2	7	1	36
14	FW	29	(Cameroon) Eto'o	21	3	2	9	0	35
15	DF	4	(Brazil) David Luiz	19	3	3	8	1	34
16	MF	19	(Senegal) Ba	19	1	3	6	0	29
17	DF	3	(England) Cole	17	2	1	5	1	26
18	MF	21	(Serbia) Matić	17	2	0	0	0	19
19	MF	10	(Spain) Mata	13	0	2	2	0	17
20	GK	23	(Australia) Schwarzer	4	2	3	3	0	12
21	MF	15	(Egypt) Salah	10	1	0	0	0	11
22	MF	5	(Ghana) Essien	5	1	3	0	0	9
22	MF	–	(Belgium) De Bruyne	3	0	3	3	0	9
24	MF	16	(Netherlands) Van Ginkel	2	0	1	1	0	4
24	DF	33	(Czech Republic) Kalas	2	0	1	1	0	4
26	FW	18	(Belgium) Lukaku	2	0	0	0	1	3
26	DF	34	(England) Bertrand	1	0	2	0	0	3
28	DF	27	(Netherlands) Aké	1	0	0	0	0	1
28	MF	47	(England) Baker	0	1	0	0	0	1
28	MF	49	(England) Swift	1	0	0	0	0	1

=== Goalscorers ===
This includes all competitive matches. The list is sorted by shirt number when total goals are equal.

Last updated on 11 May

Rank	Pos.	No.	Name	Premier League	FA Cup	League Cup	Champions League	UEFA Super Cup	Total
1	MF	17	(Belgium) Hazard	14	0	0	2	1	17
2	FW	29	(Cameroon) Eto'o	9	0	0	3	0	12
3	FW	9	(Spain) Torres	5	0	1	4	1	11
3	MF	11	(Brazil) Oscar	8	2	0	1	0	11
5	MF	14	(Germany) Schürrle	8	0	0	1	0	9
6	MF	8	(England) Lampard	6	0	1	1	0	8
6	FW	19	(Senegal) Ba	5	0	0	3	0	8
8	MF	7	(Brazil) Ramires	1	0	1	2	0	4
8	MF	22	(Brazil) Willian	4	0	0	0	0	4
10	DF	2	(Serbia) Ivanović	3	0	0	0	0	3
10	Own Goals			2	0	0	1	0	3
12	MF	12	(Nigeria) Mikel	1	1	0	0	0	2
12	MF	15	(Egypt) Salah	2	0	0	0	0	2
12	DF	24	(England) Cahill	1	0	0	1	0	2
12	DF	26	(England) Terry	2	0	0	0	0	2
16	MF	10	(Spain) Mata	0	0	1	0	0	1
16	DF	28	(Spain) Azpilicueta	0	0	1	0	0	1
TOTALS				71	3	5	19	2	100

=== Clean sheets ===
Last updated on 11 May 2013

Rnk	Pos	No.	Player	Premier League	FA Cup	League Cup	Champions League	Super Cup	Total
1	GK	1	(Czech Republic) Čech	16	0	0	5	0	21
2	GK	23	(Australia) Schwarzer	2	2	2	2	0	8
TOTALS				18	2	2	7	0	29

=== Summary ===
Games played	57 (38 Premier League, 3 FA Cup, 3 League Cup, 12 UEFA Champions League, 1 UEFA Super Cup)
Games won	35 (25 Premier League, 2 FA Cup, 2 League Cup, 6 UEFA Champions League)
Games drawn	10 (7 Premier League, 2 UEFA Champions League, 1 UEFA Super Cup)
Games lost	12 (6 Premier League, 1 FA Cup, 1 League Cup, 4 UEFA Champions League)
Goals scored	100 (71 Premier League, 3 FA Cup, 5 League Cup, 19 UEFA Champions League, 2 UEFA Super Cup)
Goals conceded	43 (27 Premier League, 2 FA Cup, 2 League Cup, 10 UEFA Champions League, 2 UEFA Super Cup)
Goal difference	+57 (+44 Premier League, +1 FA Cup, +3 League Cup, +9 UEFA Champions League, 0 UEFA Super Cup)
Clean sheets	29 (18 Premier League, 2 FA Cup, 2 League Cup, 7 UEFA Champions League)
Most appearances	(Serbia) B. Ivanović (50 Appearances)
Top scorer	(Belgium) E. Hazard (17 goals)
Points	Overall: 35/57 (61.4%)

== Awards ==
=== Player ===
No.	Player	Award	Month	Source
1	(Czech Republic) Petr Čech	Czech Footballer of the Year	February 2014	
1	(Czech Republic) Petr Čech	PFA Team of the Year	April 2014	
24	(England) Gary Cahill	PFA Team of the Year	April 2014	
17	(Belgium) Eden Hazard	PFA Team of the Year	April 2014	
17	(Belgium) Eden Hazard	PFA Young Player of the Year	April 2014	
14	(Germany) André Schürrle	German Football Ambassador	May 2014	
1	(Czech Republic) Petr Čech	Premier League Golden Glove	May 2014	
47	(England) Lewis Baker	Chelsea 2013–14 Goal of the Season	May 2014	
47	(England) Lewis Baker	Chelsea 2013–14 Young Player of the Year	May 2014	
28	(Spain) César Azpilicueta	Chelsea Player's Player Award	May 2014	
17	(Belgium) Eden Hazard	Chelsea Player of the Year Award	May 2014	

=== Team ===
LMA Performance of the Week

Against	Result	Date	Source
Manchester City	0–1	3 February 2014	
Arsenal	6–0	22 March 2014	
Liverpool	0–2	27 April 2014	
