= Henrique Hilário =

Portuguese footballer (born 1975)

Hilário
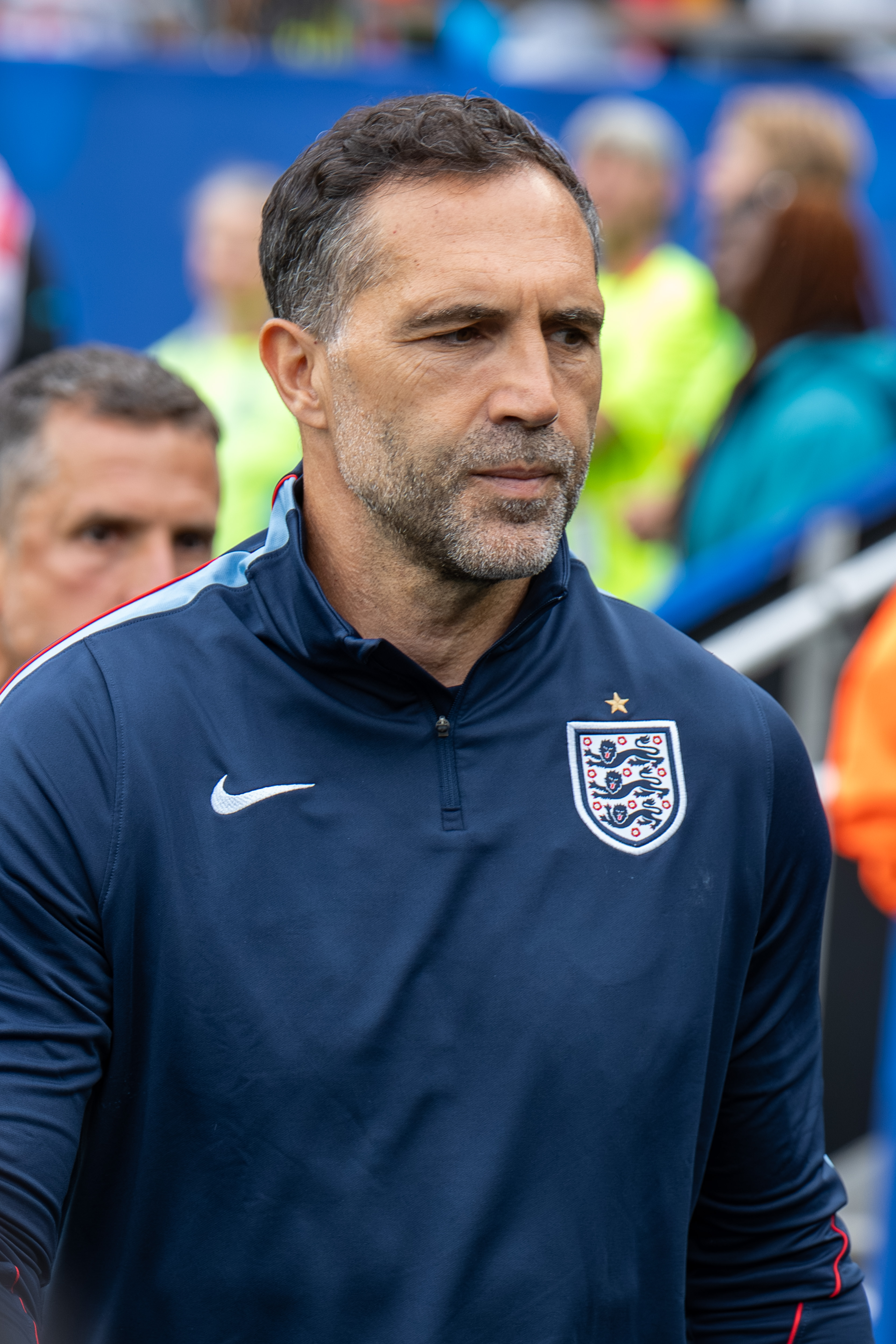
- Hilário in 2026

Personal information
- Full name: Henrique Hilário Meireles Alves Sampaio
- Date of birth: 21 October 1975 (age 51)
- Place of birth: São Pedro da Cova, Portugal
- Height: 1.89 m (6 ft 2 in)
- Position: Goalkeeper

Team information
- Current team: England (goalkeeping coach)

Youth career
- 1987–1994: Porto

Senior career*
Years	Team	Apps	(Gls)
1994–1995	Naval	27	(0)
1995–1996	Académica	33	(0)
1996–2004	CG	40	(0)
1998–1999	→ Estrela Amadora (loan)	27	(0)
1999–2002	Porto B	2	(0)
2001–2002	→ Varzim (loan)	24	(0)
2003	→ Académica (loan)	10	(0)
2003–2004	→ Nacional (loan)	19	(0)
2004–2006	Nacional	40	(0)
2006–2014	Chelsea	20	(0)
Total		242	(0)

International career
1996	Portugal U20	1	(0)
1996–1997	Portugal U21	7	(0)
2000	Portugal B	1	(0)
2010	Portugal	1	(0)
- * Club domestic league appearances and goals

Henrique Hilário Meireles Alves Sampaio (born 21 October 1975), known as Hilário, is a Portuguese football coach and former player who played as a goalkeeper. He is the goalkeeping coach of the England national team.

He spent most of his professional career with Porto and Chelsea, mainly as a backup. He appeared in 160 Primeira Liga matches over nine seasons.

== Club career ==
=== Porto and loans ===
Hilário was born in São Pedro da Cova, Porto District. After emerging through Porto's youth system, he left and began playing professionally with Naval and Académica de Coimbra – respectively in the Segunda Divisão and Segunda Divisão de Honra.

Hilário returned to Porto for the 1996–97 season, after Vítor Baía's departure to Barcelona, appearing in 18 matches as the club won the Primeira Divisão championship for the third successive season. He soon would be deemed surplus to requirements however (Baía also returned from Spain in January 1999), being loaned four times during his spell while also being demoted to the reserves.

=== Nacional ===
Released by Porto in summer 2004, Hilário signed with Nacional on a permanent basis. He played 29 matches in his first year, but lost his place after the arrival of Swiss Diego Benaglio.

=== Chelsea ===
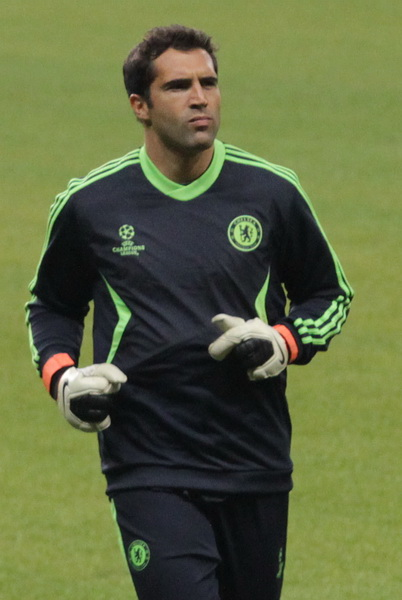
Hilário training with Chelsea in 2010

Hilário signed for Chelsea on 1 June 2006, joining former Porto boss José Mourinho, the two having coincided there for a brief period in the 2003–04 pre-season. He was originally signed as third choice behind Petr Čech and Carlo Cudicini, but was handed a run in the first team after they both sustained injuries in a game against Reading on 14 October 2006. He made his debut on 18 October against Barcelona at Stamford Bridge, keeping a clean sheet in a 1–0 win. His Premier League debut came three days later, in a 2–1 home victory over Portsmouth.

Hilário's run in the side saw him make a total of 18 appearances during the season, not conceding any goals in eight of those – he also saved a penalty in a game away to Sheffield United. Čech's return to fitness in February 2007 saw him lose his place in the team, and was an unused substitute in the Football League Cup final win over Arsenal.

At the start of the 2007–08 campaign, Hilário found himself again third choice to both Čech and Cudicini, but made a substitute appearance against Blackburn Rovers at Ewood Park after Čech suffered a hip injury. He went on to start against Newcastle United and Fulham as his team won both matches 2–1. On 8 April 2008, he came from the bench against Fenerbahce (due to an injury to Cudicini) in the second leg of the quarter-finals of the UEFA Champions League (2–0 home win, 3–2 on aggregate).

Cudicini left for Tottenham Hotspur in January 2009, leaving Hilário as second choice and promoting Rhys Taylor to the first team. Hilário made his first start of 2008–09 on 7 February after an injury to Čech, in a 0–0 draw at home to Hull City. He was also an unused substitute during Chelsea's 2009 FA Cup final defeat of Everton.

On 26 September 2009, when Čech was red carded against Wigan Athletic after a tackle on Hugo Rodallega, Hilário came on for Florent Malouda and conceded two goals in a 3–1 away loss. Due to Čech's suspension, he was in the starting line-up for the game against Liverpool at home on 4 October, and performed well, keeping a clean sheet.

Hilário made his first appearance of 2010 after coming off the bench for an injured Čech in the second half of Chelsea's 2–1 loss at Inter Milan in the first leg of the Champions League round of 16, conceding no goals in about 30 minutes. He added another in the Premier League, this time against Manchester City, conceding braces from Craig Bellamy and Carlos Tevez in their first home defeat of the 2009–10 season (4–2), although his side eventually won the championship.

In June 2011, Hilário signed a new one-year contract with Chelsea. Following the appointment of countryman André Villas-Boas as manager and the knee injury suffered by Čech in pre-season, he was propelled to the starting line-up over Ross Turnbull, appearing in two games and conceding twice in as many home wins.

Hilário was due to be released at the end of 2012–13 as his contract expired. On 1 August, however, following the return of his compatriot Mourinho as manager, he agreed to a new one-year deal with the club. He eventually left at the end of the season, before retiring from playing in August at the age of 38.

== International career ==
Hilário received his first call-up for Portugal in November 2009, at the age of 34, as backup to Eduardo for the 2010 FIFA World Cup qualifying matches against Bosnia and Herzegovina, a role for which Beto, Daniel Fernandes, José Moreira and Rui Patrício were also tried. After being an unused substitute on that match he made his debut in the next game, coming on for Eduardo at half-time of the 2–0 friendly win over China on 3 March 2010.

== Coaching career ==
Hilário returned to Chelsea on 22 July 2016, as assistant goalkeeping coach to newly appointed manager Antonio Conte. He was promoted to the position of goalkeeping coach under Maurizio Sarri in August 2018.

On 20 November 2024, Hilário became goalkeeper coach of the England national team, under Thomas Tuchel who he worked with at Chelsea; the former had spent 18 years at the club as both a player and coach.

== Career statistics ==
=== Club ===
Appearances and goals by club, season and competition
Club	Season	League			National cup (Note: Includes Taça de Portugal, FA Cup)		League cup (Note: Includes Football League Cup)		Europe		Other		Total	
Club	Season	Division	Apps	Goals	Apps	Goals	Apps	Goals	Apps	Goals	Apps	Goals	Apps	Goals
Naval	1994–95	Segunda Divisão B	27	0	—		—		—		—		27	0
Académica	1995–96	Segunda Divisão de Honra	33	0	—		—		—		—		33	0
Porto	1996–97	Primeira Divisão	18	0	3	0	—		5 (Note: Appearances in UEFA Champions League)	0	0	0	26	0
Porto	1997–98	Primeira Divisão	3	0	1	0	—		0	0	0	0	4	0
Porto	1999–2000	Primeira Liga	19	0	4	0	—		6	0	0	0	29	0
Porto	Total		40	0	8	0	—		11	0	0	0	59	0
Estrela Amadora (loan)	1998–99	Primeira Divisão	27	0	0	0	—		0	0	—		27	0
Porto B	1999–2000	Segunda Divisão B	1	0	—		—		—		—		1	0
Porto B	2002–03	Segunda Divisão B	1	0	—		—		—		—		1	0
Porto B	Total		2	0	—		—		—		—		2	0
Varzim (loan)	2001–02	Primeira Liga	24	0	0	0	—		—		—		24	0
Académica (loan)	2002–03	Primeira Liga	10	0	2	0	—		—		—		12	0
Nacional (loan)	2003–04	Primeira Liga	19	0	3	0	—		—		—		22	0
Nacional	2004–05	Primeira Liga	29	0	1	0	—		2 (Note: Appearances in UEFA Cup)	0	—		32	0
Nacional	2005–06	Primeira Liga	11	0	3	0	—		—		—		14	0
Nacional	Total		40	0	4	0	—		2	0	—		46	0
Chelsea	2006–07	Premier League	11	0	1	0	3	0	3	0	0	0	18	0
Chelsea	2007–08	Premier League	3	0	1	0	1	0	1	0	0	0	6	0
Chelsea	2008–09	Premier League	1	0	0	0	0	0	0	0	—		1	0
Chelsea	2009–10	Premier League	3	0	4	0	3	0	1	0	0	0	11	0
Chelsea	2010–11	Premier League	0	0	0	0	0	0	0	0	1 (Note: Appearance in FA Community Shield)	0	1	0
Chelsea	2011–12	Premier League	2	0	0	0	0	0	0	0	—		2	0
Chelsea	2012–13	Premier League	0	0	0	0	0	0	0	0	—		0	0
Chelsea	2013–14	Premier League	0	0	0	0	0	0	0	0	—		0	0
Chelsea	Total		20	0	6	0	7	0	5	0	1	0	39	0
Career total			242	0	23	0	7	0	18	0	1	0	291	0

=== International ===
Appearances and goals by national team and year
National team	Year	Apps	Goals
Portugal	2010	1	0
Total		1	0

== Honours ==
Porto

- Primeira Divisão: 1996–97, 1997–98
- Taça de Portugal: 1999–2000
- Supertaça Cândido de Oliveira: 1999

Chelsea

- FA Cup: 2008–09, 2009–10
- Football League Cup: 2006–07
- FA Community Shield: 2009
