= 2007–08 Chelsea F.C. season =

English football club season

Chelsea
2007–08 season
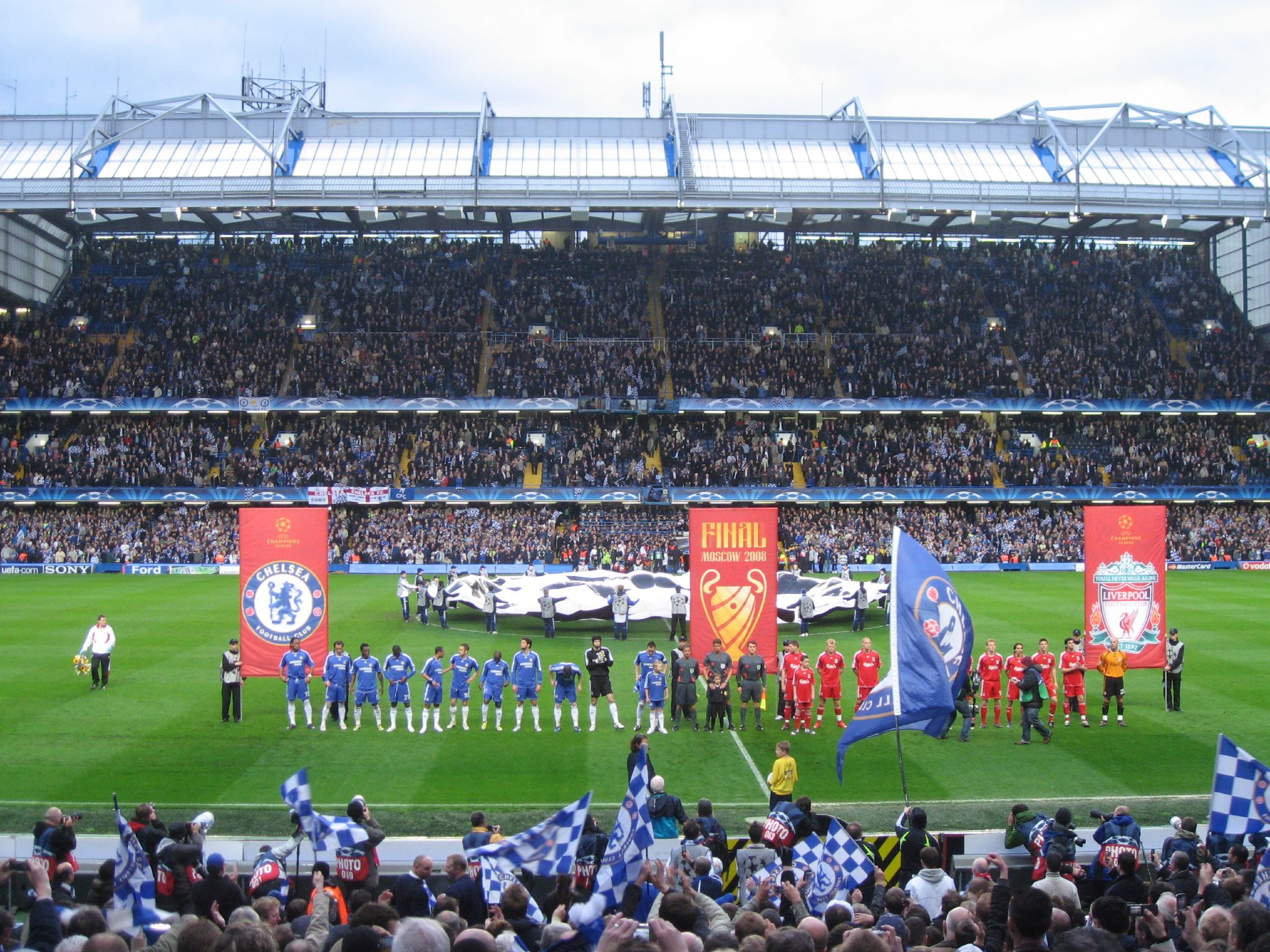
- Chelsea and Liverpool players before the UEFA Champions League semi-final 2nd leg at Stamford Bridge
- Owner: Roman Abramovich
- Chairman: Bruce Buck
- Manager: José Mourinho (until 20 September); Avram Grant (from 20 September)
- Stadium: Stamford Bridge
- Premier League: 2nd
- FA Cup: Sixth round
- League Cup: Runners-up
- FA Community Shield: Runners-up
- UEFA Champions League: Runners-up
- Top goalscorer: League: Frank Lampard (10); All: Frank Lampard (20)
- Highest home attendance: 41,837 (vs. Fulham, 29 September)
- Lowest home attendance: 24,973 (vs. Rosenborg, 18 September)
Home colours	Away colours	Third colours

The 2007–08 season was Chelsea Football Club's 94th competitive season, 16th consecutive season in the Premier League, and 102nd year as a club. Manager José Mourinho left the club by mutual consent on 20 September 2007 following a disappointing 1–1 draw with Rosenborg and was replaced by Avram Grant.

The 2007–08 Premier League season was decided on the last day of the season, when Chelsea needed to win against Bolton Wanderers and Manchester United to either draw or lose against Wigan Athletic. Chelsea drew 1–1 and Manchester United won 2–0, thus making Chelsea runners-up to United for the second consecutive season.

Chelsea played in their first UEFA Champions League Final, against Manchester United, making it the first all-English final in the competition's history. After extra time the score was 1–1, and the game went to a penalty shootout. Captain John Terry had the opportunity to win the title for Chelsea, however, he slipped as he took his shot and missed. Manchester United ultimately won the penalty shootout 6–5 after Edwin van der Sar saved Nicolas Anelka's penalty.

Chelsea went the entire 2007–08 campaign without suffering a single defeat at home. In spite of this, this was the first season in four years that Chelsea had finished the season without a trophy; the lack of silverware led to Avram Grant being sacked three days after the Champions League final. Five days later, Chelsea's assistant first-team coach, Henk ten Cate, had his contract terminated as well.

== Kits ==
Supplier: Adidas / Sponsor: Samsung Mobile

Home	Home alt.	2008–09	UEFA Champions League Final	Away	Away alt. 1	Away alt. 2	Third	Third alt.

Goalkeeper 1	UEFA Champions League Final & 2008–09	Goalkeeper 2	Goalkeeper 3	Goalkeeper alt.	Goalkeeper 4

== Squad ==
Note: Flags indicate national team as defined under FIFA eligibility rules; some limited exceptions apply. Players may hold more than one non-FIFA nationality.

No.	Pos.	Nation	Player
1	GK	CZE	Petr Čech
2	DF	SRB	Branislav Ivanović
3	DF	ENG	Ashley Cole
4	MF	FRA	Claude Makélélé
5	MF	GHA	Michael Essien
6	DF	POR	Ricardo Carvalho
7	FW	UKR	Andriy Shevchenko
8	MF	ENG	Frank Lampard (vice-captain)
9	MF	ENG	Steve Sidwell
10	MF	ENG	Joe Cole
11	FW	CIV	Didier Drogba
12	MF	NGR	Mikel John Obi
13	MF	GER	Michael Ballack
14	FW	PER	Claudio Pizarro
15	MF	FRA	Florent Malouda
17	MF	ENG	Scott Sinclair

No.	Pos.	Nation	Player
18	DF	ENG	Wayne Bridge
20	DF	POR	Paulo Ferreira
21	FW	CIV	Salomon Kalou
22	DF	ISR	Tal Ben Haim
23	GK	ITA	Carlo Cudicini
24	MF	ENG	Shaun Wright-Phillips
26	DF	ENG	John Terry (captain)
27	FW	ISR	Ben Sahar
28	MF	ENG	Michael Woods
30	GK	WAL	Rhys Taylor
33	DF	BRA	Alex
35	DF	BRA	Juliano Belletti
39	FW	FRA	Nicolas Anelka
40	GK	POR	Henrique Hilário
41	DF	ENG	Sam Hutchinson
42	MF	ENG	Lee Sawyer

=== Left club during season ===
Note: Flags indicate national team as defined under FIFA eligibility rules; some limited exceptions apply. Players may hold more than one non-FIFA nationality.

No.	Pos.	Nation	Player
2	DF	ENG	Glen Johnson (to Portsmouth)
16	MF	NED	Arjen Robben (to Real Madrid)

No.	Pos.	Nation	Player
19	MF	FRA	Lassana Diarra (to Arsenal)
39	DF	ENG	Harry Worley (to Leicester City)

== Reserve squad ==
Note: Flags indicate national team as defined under FIFA eligibility rules; some limited exceptions apply. Players may hold more than one non-FIFA nationality.

No.	Pos.	Nation	Player
31	MF	ENG	Anthony Grant
32	DF	ENG	Carl Magnay
34	MF	ENG	Liam Bridcutt
37	MF	ENG	Jack Cork

No.	Pos.	Nation	Player
43	DF	ENG	Ryan Bertrand
44	DF	ENG	Michael Mancienne
46	MF	ENG	Jimmy Smith

== Transfers ==
=== In ===
#	Pos	Player	From	Fee	Date
Res	MF	(England) Jacob Mellis	(England) Sheffield United	Undisclosed	June 2007
Res	FW	(England) Danny Philliskirk	(England) Oldham Athletic	Undisclosed	1 June 2007
14	FW	(Peru) Claudio Pizarro	(Germany) Bayern Munich	Free	1 June 2007
22	DF	(Israel) Tal Ben Haim	(England) Bolton Wanderers	Free	14 June 2007
9	MF	(England) Steve Sidwell	(England) Reading	Free	1 July 2007
15	MF	(France) Florent Malouda	(France) Lyon	£13,500,000	10 July 2007
Res	FW	(Italy) Fabio Borini	(Italy) Bologna	Free	31 July 2007
33	DF	(Brazil) Alex	(Netherlands) PSV	Loan return	10 August 2007
35	DF	(Brazil) Juliano Belletti	(Spain) Barcelona	€5,500,000	23 August 2007
39	FW	(France) Nicolas Anelka	(England) Bolton Wanderers	£15,000,000	11 January 2008
2	DF	(Serbia) Branislav Ivanović	(Russia) Lokomotiv Moscow	£9,700,000	16 January 2008
N/A	FW	(Argentina) Franco Di Santo	(Chile) Audax Italiano	Undisclosed	25 January 2008

=== Out ===
#	Pos	Player	To	Fee	Date
33	DF	(Portugal) Nuno Morais	(Cyprus) APOEL	Free	12 May 2007
N/A	DF	(Switzerland) Jonas Elmer	(Switzerland) Aarau	Undisclosed	25 June 2007
41	GK	(Belgium) Yves Ma-Kalambay	(Scotland) Hibernian	Free	27 June 2007
14	MF	(Cameroon) Geremi	(England) Newcastle United	Free	6 July 2007
N/A	GK	(Republic of Ireland) James Russell	(England) Stevenage Borough	Free	8 August 2007
16	MF	(Netherlands) Arjen Robben	(Spain) Real Madrid	£21,000,000	22 August 2007
2	DF	(England) Glen Johnson	(England) Portsmouth	£4,000,000	31 August 2007
19	MF	(France) Lassana Diarra	(England) Arsenal	Undisclosed	31 August 2007
N/A	MF	(Argentina) Juan Sebastián Verón	(Argentina) Estudiantes La Plata	Free	2007

=== Overall transfer activity ===
==== Total Spending ====
Summer: ▼£19,000,000

Winter: £24,700,000

Total: ▼£43,700,000

==== Income ====
Summer: ▲£25,000,000

Winter: £0,000,000

Total: ▲£25,000,000

==== Expenditure ====
Summer: ▲£6,000,000

Winter: £24,700,000

Total: ▼£18,700,000

== Club ==
=== Management ===
Position	Staff
Managers	(Portugal) José Mourinho (until 20 September)
Managers	(Israel) Avram Grant (20 September–24 May)
Assistant managers	(Scotland) Steve Clarke
Assistant managers	(Israel) Avram Grant (until 20 September)
Assistant managers	(Netherlands) Henk ten Cate (20 September–29 May)
Goalkeeping coach	(France) Christophe Lollichon
Head scout	(Nigeria) Michael Emenalo
Club doctor	(England) Dr. Bryan English
Chief scout and director of youth development	(Denmark) Frank Arnesen
Reserve team manager	(Northern Ireland) Brendan Rodgers
Youth team manager	(England) Paul Clement
Academy manager	(England) Neil Bath

Last updated: 13 April 2009
Source: Chelsea FC

=== Other information ===
Owner	(Russia) Roman Abramovich
Chairman	(United States) Bruce Buck
Chief Executive	(England) Peter Kenyon
Director of Communications	(England) Simon Greenberg
Ground (capacity and dimensions)	Stamford Bridge (42,055 / 110x75 yards)

== Pre-season ==
14 July 2007	Chelsea (England)	2–1	(Mexico) América	Stanford Stadium, California
02:00 BST	Malouda 74'; Terry 83'	Report	Mosqueda 2'	Attendance: 47,329; Referee: Kevin Scott

17 July 2007	Chelsea (England)	1–0	(South Korea) Suwon Bluewings	Home Depot Center, California
04:00 BST	Drogba 83'	Report		Attendance: 15,349; Referee: Ricardo Salazar

22 July 2007	LA Galaxy (United States)	0–1	(England) Chelsea	Home Depot Center, California
02:00 BST		Report	Terry 48'	Attendance: 27,000; Referee: Brian Hall

25 July 2007	Feyenoord (Netherlands)	1–1	(England) Chelsea	Feijenoord Stadion, Rotterdam
18:00 BST	Hofland 45'	Report	Lampard 79'	Attendance: 44,000; Referee: Ruud Bossen

28 July 2007	Rangers (Scotland)	2–0	(England) Chelsea	Ibrox Stadium, Glasgow
15:00 BST	Novo 84'; Šebo 86'	Report		Attendance: 50,380; Referee: Stuart Dougal

31 July 2007	Brøndby IF (Denmark)	0–2	(England) Chelsea	Brøndby Stadium, Copenhagen
19:10 BST		Report	Drogba 61', 84'	Attendance: 22,800

== Competitions ==
=== FA Community Shield ===
5 August 2007 Final	Chelsea	1–1 (a.e.t.) (0–3 p)	Manchester United	London, England
15:00 BST	Tal Ben Haim (yellow card) 33'; Malouda 45'; Carvalho (yellow card) 63'; Mikel (yellow card) 90+1'	Report	Giggs 35'; Rooney (yellow card) 45+3'	Stadium: Wembley Stadium; Attendance: 80,731; Referee: Mark Halsey (Lancashire)
	Penalties
	Pizzaro (penalty missed); Lampard (penalty missed); Wright-Phillips (penalty missed)		(penalty scored) Ferdinand; (penalty scored) Carrick; (penalty scored) Rooney

=== Premier League ===
==== Classification ====
Pos	Team	Pld	W	D	L	GF	GA	GD	Pts	Qualification or relegation
1	Manchester United (C)	38	27	6	5	80	22	+58	87	Qualification for the Champions League group stage
2	Chelsea	38	25	10	3	65	26	+39	85	Qualification for the Champions League group stage
3	Arsenal	38	24	11	3	74	31	+43	83	Qualification for the Champions League third qualifying round
4	Liverpool	38	21	13	4	67	28	+39	76	Qualification for the Champions League third qualifying round
5	Everton	38	19	8	11	55	33	+22	65	Qualification for the UEFA Cup first round

Source: Barclays Premier League
Rules for classification: 1) points; 2) goal difference; 3) number of goals scored.
For further information on European qualification see Premier League – Competition
(C) Champions

==== Results summary ====
Overall								Home						Away					
Pld	W	D	L	GF	GA	GD	Pts	W	D	L	GF	GA	GD	W	D	L	GF	GA	GD
38	25	10	3	65	26	+39	85	12	7	0	36	13	+23	13	3	3	29	13	+16

Last updated: 5 May 2008.
Source: Barclays Premier League

==== Results by round ====
Round	1	2	3	4	5	6	7	8	9	10	11	12	13	14	15	16	17	18	19	20	21	22	23	24	25	26	27	28	29	30	31	32	33	34	35	36	37	38
Ground	H	A	A	H	A	H	A	H	A	A	H	A	H	A	H	H	A	A	H	H	A	H	A	H	A	H	A	H	A	A	H	H	A	H	A	H	A	H
Result	W	W	D	W	L	D	L	D	W	W	W	W	D	W	W	W	L	W	D	W	W	W	W	W	D	D	W	W	W	D	W	W	W	D	W	W	W	D
Points	3	6	7	10	10	11	11	12	15	18	21	24	25	28	31	34	34	37	38	41	44	47	50	53	54	55	58	61	64	65	68	71	74	75	78	81	84	85

Updated to match(es) played on 5 May 2008. Source: Competitive Matches
A = Away; H = Home; W = Win; D = Draw; L = Loss

==== Matches ====
12 August 2007 1	Chelsea	3–2	Birmingham City	Stamford Bridge, London
13:30 BST	Pizarro 17'; Malouda 30'; Essien 49', (yellow card) 52'; Carvalho (yellow card) 79'	(Report)	Forssell 14'; Kapo 34'; Larsson (yellow card) 77'	Attendance: 41,590; Referee: Steve Bennett

15 August 2007 2	Reading	1–2	Chelsea	Madejski Stadium, Reading
20:00 BST	Long (yellow card) 13'; Cissé (yellow card) 15' (yellow-red card) 72'; Bikey 30'; Hunt (yellow card) 37'; Ingimarsson (yellow card) 52'	(Report)	Carvalho (yellow card) 26'; Sidwell (yellow card) 31'; Lampard 47'; Drogba 50'; Wright-Phillips (yellow card) 76'; A. Cole (yellow card) 89'; Mikel (yellow card) 90'	Attendance: 24,031; Referee: Mike Dean

19 August 2007 3	Liverpool	1–1	Chelsea	Anfield, Liverpool
16:00 BST	Torres 15'; Kuyt (yellow card) 30'; Pennant (yellow card) 40'; Gerrard (yellow card) 43'; Carragher (yellow card) 61'	(Report)	Essien (yellow card) 12'; A. Cole (yellow card) 59'; Ben Haim (yellow card) 63'; Lampard 62' (pen.), (yellow card) 70'; Terry (yellow card) 74'	Attendance: 43,924; Referee: Robert Styles

25 August 2007 4	Chelsea	1–0	Portsmouth	Stamford Bridge, London
15:00 BST	Lampard 30'	(Report)	Davis (yellow card) 52'; Muntari (yellow card) 77'	Attendance: 41,501; Referee: Alan Wiley

2 September 2007 5	Aston Villa	2–0	Chelsea	Villa Park, Birmingham
16:00 BST	Knight 47'; Reo-Coker (yellow card) 56'; Barry (yellow card) 66'; Agbonlahor (yellow card) 71', (goal) 88'; Carew (yellow card) 71'	(Report)	Drogba (yellow card) 70'	Attendance: 31,714; Referee: Mark Clattenburg

15 September 2007 6	Chelsea	0–0	Blackburn Rovers	Stamford Bridge, London
17:15 BST	J. Cole (yellow card) 74'; Belletti (yellow card) 75'	(Report)	Warnock (yellow card) 82'; Savage (yellow card) 84'	Attendance: 41,062; Referee: Howard Webb

23 September 2007 7	Manchester United	2–0	Chelsea	Old Trafford, Manchester
16:00 BST	Tevez 45+2'; Rooney (yellow card) 61'; Brown (yellow card) 80'; Saha 88' (pen.)	(Report)	Mikel (red card) 32'; J. Cole (yellow card) 73'; Terry (yellow card) 83'	Attendance: 75,663; Referee: Mike Dean

29 September 2007 8	Chelsea	0–0	Fulham	Stamford Bridge, London
15:00 BST	Drogba (yellow card) 34' (yellow-red card) 73'	(Report)	Davis (yellow card) 82'	Attendance: 41,837; Referee: Martin Atkinson

7 October 2007 9	Bolton Wanderers	0–1	Chelsea	Reebok Stadium, Middlebrook
15:00 BST	Campo (yellow card) 18'; Diouf (yellow card) 24'; McCann (yellow card) 54'; Davies (yellow card) 72'; Jääskeläinen (yellow card) 90'	(Report)	Kalou 40'; Carvalho (yellow card) 69'	Attendance: 20,059; Referee: Alan Wiley

20 October 2007 10	Middlesbrough	0–2	Chelsea	Riverside Stadium, Middlesbrough
15:00 BST	Boateng (yellow card) 48'	(Report)	Drogba 8'; Alex 52'; Malouda (yellow card) 72'	Attendance: 27,669; Referee: Mark Halsey

27 October 2007 11	Chelsea	6–0	Manchester City	Stamford Bridge, London
15:00 BST	Essien 17', (yellow card) 26'; Lampard (yellow card) 29'; Drogba 30', 55'; J. Cole 60'; Kalou 75'; Shevchenko 90'	(Report)	Richards (yellow card) 28'; Johnson (yellow card) 44'	Attendance: 41,832; Referee: Mike Riley

3 November 2007 12	Wigan Athletic	0–2	Chelsea	JJB Stadium, Wigan
15:00 GMT	Landzaat (yellow card) 58'; Bramble (yellow card) 88'	(Report)	Lampard 10'; Belletti 17'; Drogba (yellow card) 65'	Attendance: 19,011; Referee: Steve Bennett

11 November 2007 13	Chelsea	1–1	Everton	Stamford Bridge, London
14:00 GMT	Belletti (yellow card) 51'; Essien (yellow card) 66'; Drogba 70'	(Report)	Neville (yellow card) 39'; Cahill 88'; Pienaar (yellow card) 90+2'	Attendance: 41,683; Referee: Alan Wiley

24 November 2007 14	Derby County	0–2	Chelsea	Pride Park Stadium, Derby
17:15 GMT		(Report)	Kalou 16'; Wright-Phillips 72'; A. Cole (yellow card) 76'; Essien (red card) 90+2'	Attendance: 32,789; Referee: Andre Marriner

1 December 2007 15	Chelsea	1–0	West Ham United	Stamford Bridge, London
12:45 GMT	Mikel (yellow card) 37'; Kalou (yellow card) 41'; Belletti (yellow card) 55'; Lampard (yellow card) 71'; J. Cole 76'; Terry (yellow card) 85'	(Report)	Etherington (yellow card) 23'; Solano (yellow card) 34'; Boa Morte (yellow card) 45'	Attendance: 41,830; Referee: Howard Webb

8 December 2007 16	Chelsea	2–0	Sunderland	Stamford Bridge, London
15:00 GMT	Shevchenko 22'; Lampard 74' (pen.)	(Report)	Wallace (yellow card) 40'; Miller (red card) 88'	Attendance: 41,707; Referee: Peter Walton

16 December 2007 17	Arsenal	1–0	Chelsea	Emirates Stadium, London
16:00 GMT	Adebayor (yellow card) 22'; Eboué (yellow card) 35'; Gallas 45+2'; Flamini (yellow card) 63'; Fàbregas (yellow card) 90+7'	(Report)	Terry (yellow card) 30'; Lampard (yellow card) 30'; J. Cole (yellow card) 67'; Ben Haim (yellow card) 74'; Mikel (yellow card) 84'	Attendance: 60,139; Referee: Alan Wiley

23 December 2007 18	Blackburn Rovers	0–1	Chelsea	Ewood Park, Blackburn
16:10 GMT	Dunn (yellow card) 37'	(Report)	Alex (yellow card) 10'; J. Cole 21'; Carvalho (yellow card) 79'	Attendance: 23,966; Referee: Steve Bennett

26 December 2007 19	Chelsea	4–4	Aston Villa	Stamford Bridge, London
13:00 GMT	Essien (yellow card) 19'; Shevchenko 45+4' (pen.), 49'; Alex 65', (yellow card) 90+2'; Carvalho (red card) 78'; Ballack 87', (yellow card) 90+2'; A. Cole (red card) 90+1'	(Report)	Maloney 13', 43'; Knight (red card) 45+2'; Reo-Coker (yellow card) 55'; Laursen 71'; Barry 90+2' (pen.); Harewood (yellow card) 90+2'	Attendance: 41,686; Referee: Phil Dowd

29 December 2007 20	Chelsea	2–1	Newcastle United	Stamford Bridge, London
15:00 GMT	Alex (yellow card) 5'; Essien 28'; Kalou 87'	(Report)	Faye (yellow card) 12'; Butt 56'; Given (yellow card) 88'	Attendance: 41,751; Referee: Mike Riley

1 January 2008 21	Fulham	1–2	Chelsea	Craven Cottage, Hammersmith and Fulham
12:45 GMT	Murphy 9' (pen.); Stefanović (yellow card) 67'	(Report)	Kalou 53'; Ballack 61' (pen.)	Attendance: 25,357; Referee: Mark Halsey

12 January 2008 22	Chelsea	2–0	Tottenham Hotspur	Stamford Bridge, London
15:00 GMT	Belletti 18'; Makélélé (yellow card) 58'; Ballack (yellow card) 68'; Wright-Phillips 80'	(Report)	Boateng (yellow card) 23'; Malbranque (yellow card) 53'; O'Hara (yellow card) 75'; Lennon (yellow card) 78'	Attendance: 41,777; Referee: Alan Wiley

19 January 2008 23	Birmingham City	0–1	Chelsea	St. Andrew's, Birmingham
15:00 GMT	Muamba (yellow card) 11'	(Report)	Pizarro (yellow card) 77', (goal) 78'	Attendance: 26,567; Referee: Robert Styles

30 January 2008 24	Chelsea	1–0	Reading	Stamford Bridge, London
19:45 GMT	Ballack 31'	(Report)		Attendance: 41,171; Referee: Mike Dean

2 February 2008 25	Portsmouth	1–1	Chelsea	Fratton Park, Hampshire
15:00 GMT	Davis (yellow card) 22'; Pamarot (yellow card) 33'; Defoe 62'	(Report)	Anelka 54'	Attendance: 20,488; Referee: Howard Webb

10 February 2008 26	Chelsea	0–0	Liverpool	Stamford Bridge, London
16:00 GMT	Belletti (yellow card) 3'; Carvalho (yellow card) 74'; Alex (yellow card) 78'	(Report)	Babel (yellow card) 41'; Riise (yellow card) 63'	Attendance: 41,788; Referee: Mike Riley

1 March 2008 27	West Ham United	0–4	Chelsea	Upton Park, London
15:00 GMT		(Report)	Lampard 16' (pen.), (red card) 34'; J. Cole 19'; Ballack 21', (yellow card) 36'; Terry (yellow card) 45+2'; A. Cole 63'	Attendance: 34,969; Referee: Peter Walton

12 March 2008 28	Chelsea	6–1	Derby County	Stamford Bridge, London
20:00 GMT	Lampard 27' (pen.), 56', 65', 71'; Kalou 42'; J. Cole 63'	(Report)	Jones 72'; McEveley (yellow card) 85'	Attendance: 39,447; Referee: Chris Foy

15 March 2008 29	Sunderland	0–1	Chelsea	Stadium of Light, Sunderland
15:00 GMT	Whitehead (yellow card) 51'; Leadbitter (yellow card) 58'	(Report)	Terry 9'; Mikel (yellow card) 60'	Attendance: 44,679; Referee: Mike Dean

18 March 2008 30	Tottenham Hotspur	4–4	Chelsea	White Hart Lane, London
20:00 GMT	Woodgate 12'; Berbatov 60'; Huddlestone (yellow card) 72', (goal) 74'; Keane (yellow card) 45+2', (goal) 87'	(Report)	Drogba 2'; Essien 19'; J. Cole (yellow card) 36', (goal) 51', 79'; A. Cole (yellow card) 45+1'	Attendance: 36,178; Referee: Mike Riley

23 March 2008 31	Chelsea	2–1	Arsenal	Stamford Bridge, London
16:00 GMT	J. Cole (yellow card) 32'; Ballack (yellow card) 34'; Drogba 73', 81', (yellow card) 74'	(Report)	Eboué (yellow card) 5'; Sagna 59'	Attendance: 41,824; Referee: Mark Clattenburg

30 March 2008 32	Chelsea	1–0	Middlesbrough	Stamford Bridge, London
16:00 GMT	Carvalho 6'; Belletti (yellow card) 90+4'	(Report)	Cattermole (yellow card) 45+1'	Attendance: 39,993; Referee: Phil Dowd

5 April 2008 33	Manchester City	0–2	Chelsea	City of Manchester Stadium, Manchester
15:00 GMT	Fernandes (yellow card) 45'	(Report)	Dunne 5' (o.g.); Kalou 54'	Attendance: 42,594; Referee: Chris Foy

14 April 2008 34	Chelsea	1–1	Wigan Athletic	Stamford Bridge, London
20:00 GMT	Essien 54'	(Report)	Koumas (yellow card) 68'; Valencia (yellow card) 89'; Heskey 90+2'	Attendance: 40,487; Referee: Andre Marriner

17 April 2008 35	Everton	0–1	Chelsea	Goodison Park, Liverpool
20:00 GMT		(Report)	Carvalho (yellow card) 23'; Essien 40'; Ferreira (yellow card) 57'	Attendance: 37,411; Referee: Martin Atkinson

26 April 2008 36	Chelsea	2–1	Manchester United	Stamford Bridge, London
12:45 GMT	Ballack 45', 86' (pen.) (yellow card) 45'; Mikel (yellow card) 77'; Drogba (yellow card) 88'	(Report)	Brown (yellow card) 52'; Rooney 57'; Van der Sar (yellow card) 86'; Ferdinand (yellow card) 90+2'; Hargreaves (yellow card) 90+2'	Attendance: 41,828; Referee: Alan Wiley

5 May 2008 37	Newcastle United	0–2	Chelsea	St James' Park, Newcastle upon Tyne
16:00 BST	Faye (yellow card) 60'; José Enrique (yellow card) 76'	(Report)	Terry (yellow card) 34'; Ballack 61'; Malouda (yellow card) 69' (goal) 82'	Attendance: 52,305; Referee: Steve Bennett

11 May 2008 38	Chelsea	1–1	Bolton Wanderers	Stamford Bridge, London
15:00 GMT	Shevchenko 61'; Drogba (yellow card) 81'	(Report)	O'Brien (yellow card) 17'; McCann (yellow card) 39'; Davies (yellow card) 45'; Taylor 90+2'	Attendance: 41,755; Referee: Chris Foy

=== UEFA Champions League ===
==== Group stage ====
Pos	Team	Pld	W	D	L	GF	GA	GD	Pts	Qualification	CHE	SCH	ROS	VAL
1	(England) Chelsea	6	3	3	0	9	2	+7	12	Advance to knockout stage	—	2–0	1–1	0–0
2	(Germany) Schalke 04	6	2	2	2	5	4	+1	8	Advance to knockout stage	0–0	—	3–1	0–1
3	(Norway) Rosenborg	6	2	1	3	6	10	−4	7	Transfer to UEFA Cup	0–4	0–2	—	2–0
4	(Spain) Valencia	6	1	2	3	2	6	−4	5		1–2	0–0	0–2	—

Source: RSSSF

18 September 2007 1	Chelsea (England)	1–1	(Norway) Rosenborg	London, England
19:45 BST	Shevchenko 53'	Report	Koppinen 24'	Stadium: Stamford Bridge; Attendance: 24,973; Referee: Laurent Duhamel (France)

3 October 2007 2	Valencia (Spain)	1–2	(England) Chelsea	Valencia, Spain
19:45 BST	Villa 9'	Report	J. Cole 21'; Drogba 71'	Stadium: Mestalla Stadium; Attendance: 52,000; Referee: Roberto Rosetti (Italy)

24 October 2007 3	Chelsea (England)	2–0	(Germany) Schalke 04	London, England
19:45 BST	Malouda 4'; Drogba 47'	Report		Stadium: Stamford Bridge; Attendance: 40,910; Referee: Peter Fröjdfeldt (Sweden)

6 November 2007 4	Schalke 04 (Germany)	0–0	(England) Chelsea	Gelsenkirchen, Germany
19:45 GMT		Report		Stadium: Arena AufSchalke; Attendance: 53,951; Referee: Massimo Busacca (Switzerland)

28 November 2007 5	Rosenborg (Norway)	0–4	(England) Chelsea	Trondheim, Norway
19:45 GMT		Report	Drogba 8', 20'; Alex 40'; J. Cole 73'	Stadium: Lerkendal stadion Attendance: 21,582; Referee: Olegário Benquerença (Portugal)

11 December 2007 6	Chelsea (England)	0–0	(Spain) Valencia	London, England
19:45 GMT		Report		Stadium: Stamford Bridge; Attendance: 41,439; Referee: Grzegorz Gilewski (Poland)

==== Knockout phase ====
===== Round of 16 =====
19 February 2008 First leg	Olympiacos (Greece)	0–0	(England) Chelsea	Piraeus, Greece
20:45 GMT		Report		Stadium: Geórgios Karaïskákis Stadium; Attendance: 31,302; Referee: Konrad Plautz (Austria)

5 March 2008 Second leg	Chelsea (England)	3–0 (3–0 agg.)	(Greece) Olympiacos	London, England
19:45 GMT	Ballack 5'; Lampard 25'; Kalou 48'	Report		Stadium: Stamford Bridge; Attendance: 37,721; Referee: Manuel Mejuto González (Spain)

===== Quarter-finals =====
2 April 2008 First leg	Fenerbahçe (Turkey)	2–1	(England) Chelsea	Istanbul, Turkey
20:45 GMT	Kazim-Richards 65'; Deivid 81'	Report	Deivid 13' (o.g.)	Stadium: Şükrü Saracoğlu Stadium; Attendance: 49,055; Referee: Claus Bo Larsen (Denmark)

8 April 2008 Second leg	Chelsea (England)	2–0 (3–2 agg.)	(Turkey) Fenerbahçe	London, England
20:45 GMT	Ballack 4'; Lampard 87'	Report		Stadium: Stamford Bridge; Attendance: 38,369; Referee: Herbert Fandel (Germany)

===== Semi-finals =====
22 April 2008 First leg	Liverpool (England)	1–1	(England) Chelsea	Liverpool, England
20:45 GMT	Kuyt 43'	Report	Riise 90+5' (o.g.)	Stadium: Anfield; Attendance: 42,180; Referee: Konrad Plautz (Austria)

30 April 2008 Second leg	Chelsea (England)	3–2 (a.e.t.) (4–3 agg.)	(England) Liverpool	London, England
20:45 GMT	Drogba 33', 105'; Lampard 98' (pen.)	Report	Torres 64'; Babel 117'	Stadium: Stamford Bridge; Attendance: 38,900; Referee: Roberto Rosetti (Italy)

===== Final =====
21 May 2008 Final	Manchester United (England)	1–1 (a.e.t.) (6–5 p)	(England) Chelsea	Moscow, Russia
20:45 CEST	Scholes (yellow card) 21'; Ronaldo 26'; Ferdinand (yellow card) 43'; Vidić (yellow card) 111'; Tevez (yellow card) 116'	Report	Makélélé (yellow card) 21'; Lampard 45'; Carvalho (yellow card) 45+2'; Ballack (yellow card) 116'; Drogba (red card) 116'; Essien (yellow card) 118'	Stadium: Luzhniki Stadium; Attendance: 67,310; Referee: Ľuboš Micheľ (Slovakia)
	Penalties
	Tevez (penalty scored); Carrick (penalty scored); Ronaldo (penalty missed); Hargreaves (penalty scored); Nani (penalty scored); Anderson (penalty scored); Giggs (penalty scored)		(penalty scored) Ballack; (penalty scored) Belletti; (penalty scored) Lampard; (penalty scored) A. Cole; (penalty missed) Terry; (penalty scored) Kalou; (penalty missed) Anelka

== Disciplinary record ==
No.	Nat.	Player	Yellow cards	Red cards
3	(England)	Ashley Cole	4	1
4	(France)	Claude Makélélé	1	0
5	(Ghana)	Michael Essien	5	1
6	(Portugal)	Ricardo Carvalho	6	1
8	(England)	Frank Lampard	4	1
13	(Germany)	Michael Ballack	1	0
20	(Portugal)	Paulo Ferreira	1	0
26	(England)	John Terry	6	0
33	(Brazil)	Alex	4	0
35	(Brazil)	Juliano Belletti	5	0
11	(Ivory Coast)	Didier Drogba	6	1

== Football League Cup ==
26 September 2007 Third round	Hull City	0–4	Chelsea	KC Stadium, Kingston upon Hull
19:45 BST		Report	Sinclair 36'; Kalou 47', 80'; Sidwell 51'	Attendance: 23,543; Referee: Chris Foy

31 October 2007 Fourth round	Chelsea	4–3	Leicester City	Stamford Bridge, London
19:45 BST	Lampard 20', 28'; Shevchenko 85', 90+4'	Report	McAuley 6'; Campbell 67'; Cort 73'	Attendance: 40,037; Referee: Phil Dowd

19 December 2007 Quarter-final	Chelsea	2–0	Liverpool	Stamford Bridge, London
19:45 GMT	Lampard 58'; Shevchenko 89'	Report	Crouch (red card) 59'	Attendance: 41,366; Referee: Martin Atkinson

8 January 2008 Semi-final 1st leg	Chelsea	2–1	Everton	Stamford Bridge, London
19:45 GMT	Wright-Phillips 25'; Mikel (red card) 54'; Lescott 90+2' (o.g.)	Report	Yakubu 63'	Attendance: 41,178; Referee: Peter Walton

23 January 2008 Semi-final 2nd leg	Everton	0–1	Chelsea	Goodison Park, Liverpool
19:45 GMT		Report	J. Cole 69'	Attendance: 37,086; Referee: Steve Bennett

24 February 2008 Final	Tottenham Hotspur	2–1 (a.e.t.)	Chelsea	Wembley Stadium, London
15:00 GMT	Berbatov 69' (pen.); Woodgate 93'	Report	Drogba 39'	Attendance: 87,660; Referee: Mark Halsey

=== Disciplinary record ===
No.	Nat.	Player	Yellow cards	Red cards
4	(France)	Claude Makélélé	1	0
6	(Portugal)	Ricardo Carvalho	1	0
9	(England)	Steve Sidwell	1	0
10	(England)	Joe Cole	1	0
12	(Nigeria)	Mikel John Obi	1	1
22	(Israel)	Tal Ben Haim	1	0
35	(Brazil)	Juliano Belletti	2	0

== FA Cup ==
5 January 2008 Third Round	Chelsea	1–0	Queens Park Rangers	Stamford Bridge, London
15:00 GMT	Camp 28' (o.g.)	Report		Attendance: 41,289; Referee: Mike Dean

26 January 2008 Fourth Round	Wigan Athletic	1–2	Chelsea	JJB Stadium, Wigan
17:15 GMT	Sibierski 87'	Report	Anelka 53'; Wright-Phillips 82'	Attendance: 14,116; Referee: Uriah Rennie

16 February 2008 Fifth Round	Chelsea	3–1	Huddersfield Town	Stamford Bridge, London
15:00 GMT	Lampard 17', 60'; Kalou 71'	Report	Collins 45+1'	Attendance: 41,324; Referee: Mark Clattenburg

8 March 2008 Quarter-finals	Barnsley	1–0	Chelsea	Oakwell, Yorkshire
17:30 GMT	Odejayi 66'	Report		Attendance: 22,410; Referee: Steve Bennett

=== Disciplinary record ===
No.	Nat.	Player	Yellow cards	Red cards
6	(Portugal)	Ricardo Carvalho	1	0

== Statistics ==
=== Appearances and goals ===
No.	Pos	Nat	Player	Total		Premier League		FA Cup		League Cup		Champions League		Community Shield	
No.	Pos	Nat	Player	Apps	Goals	Apps	Goals	Apps	Goals	Apps	Goals	Apps	Goals	Apps	Goals
Goalkeepers
1	GK	(Czech Republic) CZE	Petr Čech	40	0	26	0	1	0	3	0	9	0	1	0
23	GK	(Italy) ITA	Carlo Cudicini	19	0	10	0	2	0	2	0	4+1	0	0	0
40	GK	(Portugal) POR	Henrique Hilário	6	0	2+1	0	1	0	1	0	0+1	0	0	0
Defenders
3	DF	(England) ENG	Ashley Cole	41	1	27	1	1	0	1+1	0	10	0	1	0
6	DF	(Portugal) POR	Ricardo Carvalho	38	1	21	1	2	0	4	0	10	0	1	0
18	DF	(England) ENG	Wayne Bridge	22	0	9+2	0	3	0	4+1	0	3	0	0	0
20	DF	(Portugal) POR	Paulo Ferreira	28	0	15+3	0	2+1	0	1+1	0	5	0	0	0
22	DF	(Israel) ISR	Tal Ben Haim	23	0	10+3	0	2	0	3+2	0	1+1	0	1	0
26	DF	(England) ENG	John Terry	37	1	23	1	2	0	2	0	10	0	0	0
33	DF	(Brazil) BRA	Alex	39	3	22+6	2	2	0	3	0	5+1	1	0	0
35	DF	(Brazil) BRA	Juliano Belletti	38	2	20+3	2	2	0	6	0	4+3	0	0	0
Midfielders
4	MF	(France) FRA	Claude Makélélé	34	0	15+3	0	1	0	1+1	0	12+1	0	0	0
5	MF	(Ghana) GHA	Michael Essien	46	6	23+4	6	1+1	0	3+1	0	11+1	0	1	0
8	MF	(England) ENG	Frank Lampard	43	20	23+1	10	1	2	3	4	10+4	4	1	0
9	MF	(England) ENG	Steve Sidwell	25	1	7+8	0	3	0	3+2	1	0+1	0	0+1	0
10	MF	(England) ENG	Joe Cole	55	10	28+5	7	2+1	0	2+3	1	12+1	2	1	0
12	MF	(Nigeria) NGR	Mikel John Obi	39	0	21+8	0	2	0	3	0	1+3	0	1	0
13	MF	(Germany) GER	Michael Ballack	30	9	16+2	7	1+1	0	1+2	0	7	2	0	0
15	MF	(France) FRA	Florent Malouda	38	4	16+5	2	2	0	2+1	0	8+3	1	1	1
17	MF	(England) ENG	Scott Sinclair	7	1	0+1	0	2	0	3	1	0	0	0+1	0
24	MF	(England) ENG	Shaun Wright-Phillips	41	4	20+7	2	3	1	5	1	2+3	0	1	0
Forwards
7	FW	(Ukraine) UKR	Andriy Shevchenko	25	8	8+9	5	0+1	0	2	2	2+3	1	0	0
11	FW	(Ivory Coast) CIV	Didier Drogba	32	15	17+2	8	0+1	0	1	1	11	6	0	0
14	FW	(Peru) PER	Claudio Pizarro	32	2	4+17	2	2+2	0	3+1	0	1+1	0	0+1	0
21	FW	(Ivory Coast) CIV	Salomon Kalou	48	11	24+6	7	2+1	1	2+2	2	5+6	1	0	0
39	FW	(France) FRA	Nicolas Anelka	24	2	10+4	1	2+1	1	2	0	0+5	0	0	0
Players transferred out during the season
2	DF	(England) ENG	Glen Johnson	3	0	1+1	0	0	0	0	0	0	0	1	0
19	MF	(France) FRA	Lassana Diarra	1	0	0	0	0	0	0	0	0	0	0+1	0

Source: Competitions
