= Fânzeres e São Pedro da Cova =

- Civil parish
- Location in Portugal
- Coordinates: 41.166°N 8.527°W
- Country: Portugal
- Region: Norte
- Metropolitan area: Porto
- District: Porto
- Municipality: Gondomar

Area
  - Total: 21.96 km^{2} (8.48 sq mi)

Population (2011)
  - Total: 39,586
  - Density: 1,803/km^{2} (4,669/sq mi)
- Time zone: UTC+00:00 (WET)
  - Summer (DST): UTC+01:00 (WEST)

Fânzeres e São Pedro da Cova is a civil parish in the municipality of Gondomar, Portugal. It was formed in 2013 by the merger of the former parishes Fânzeres and São Pedro da Cova. The population in 2011 was 39,586, in an area of 21.96 km^{2} (8.48 sq mi).
