= Nathan Aké =

Dutch footballer (born 1995)

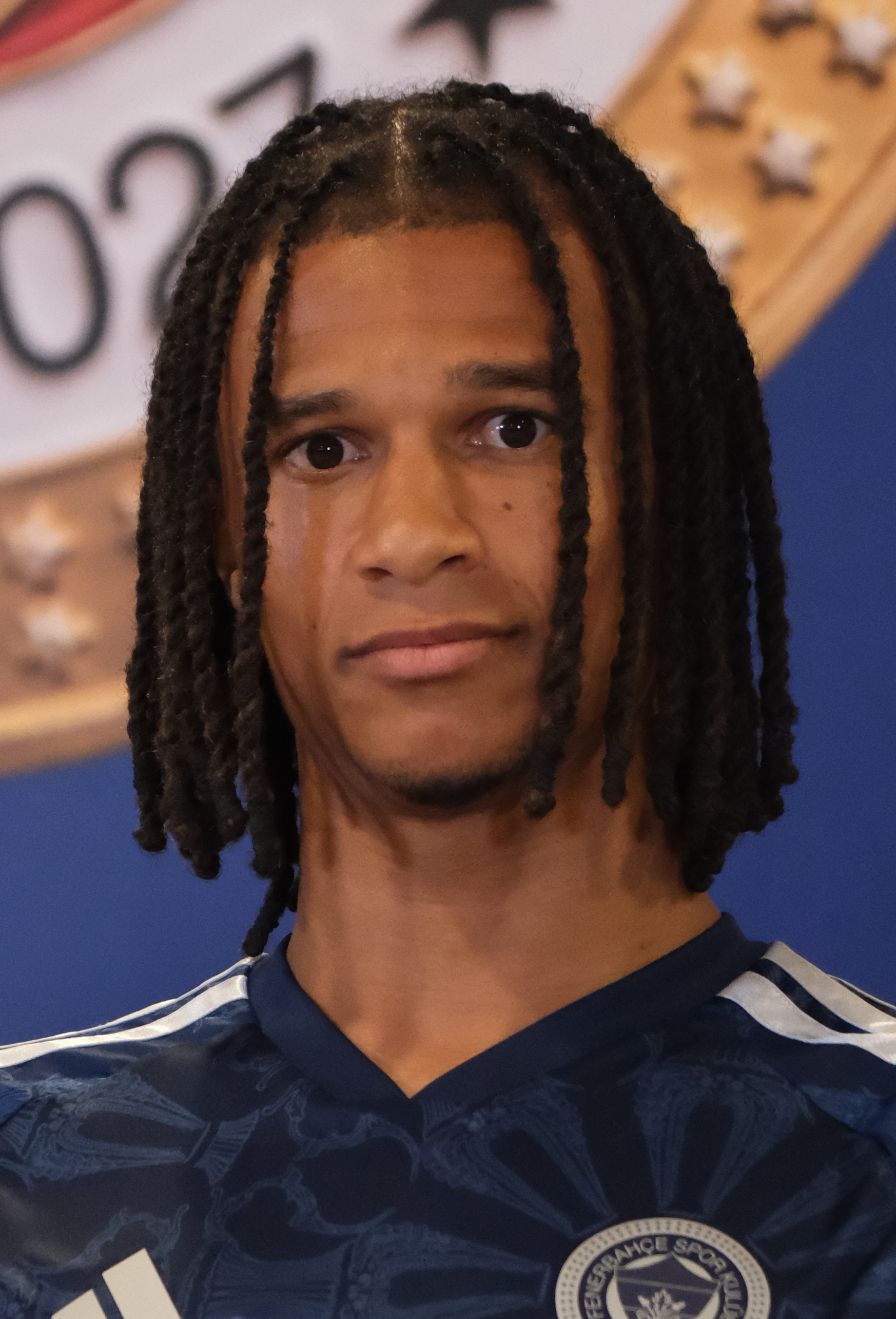
- Aké with Fenerbahçe in 2026

Personal information
- Full name: Nathan Benjamin Aké
- Date of birth: 18 February 1995 (age 31)
- Place of birth: The Hague, Netherlands
- Height: 1.80 m (5 ft 11 in)
- Positions: Centre-back; left-back

Team information
- Current team: Fenerbahçe
- Number: 15

Youth career
- 2003–2007: ADO Den Haag
- 2007–2011: Feyenoord
- 2011–2012: Chelsea

Senior career*
Years	Team	Apps	(Gls)
2012–2017	Chelsea	7	(0)
2015	→ Reading (loan)	5	(0)
2015–2016	→ Watford (loan)	24	(1)
2016–2017	→ Bournemouth (loan)	10	(3)
2017–2020	Bournemouth	105	(8)
2020–2026	Manchester City	107	(6)
2026–	Fenerbahçe	8	(0)

International career^{‡}
2009–2010	Netherlands U15	5	(0)
2010–2011	Netherlands U16	6	(3)
2011–2012	Netherlands U17	27	(3)
2012–2013	Netherlands U19	8	(3)
2013–2016	Netherlands U21	22	(2)
2017–	Netherlands	62	(5)
Medal record
Men's football
Representing Netherlands
UEFA European Championship
Bronze medal – third place	2024 Germany
UEFA Nations League
Runner-up	2019 Portugal
UEFA European Under-17 Championship
Winner	2011 Serbia
- * Club domestic league appearances and goals as of 17 October 2026 ‡ National team caps and goals as of 17:55, 30 June 2026 (UTC)

Nathan Benjamin Aké (Dutch: ['naːtɑn 'aːkeː]; born 18 February 1995) is a Dutch professional footballer who plays as a centre-back or left-back for Süper Lig club Fenerbahçe and the Netherlands national team.

== Early life ==
Nathan Benjamin Aké was born on 18 February 1995 in The Hague, South Holland, to an Ivorian father, and a Dutch mother.

== Club career ==
=== Chelsea ===
==== Early career ====
Aké agreed to join the Chelsea youth system from Feyenoord in 2010 at age 15. He had played at Feyenoord since age 12 after joining the club from ADO Den Haag.

==== First-team breakthrough ====
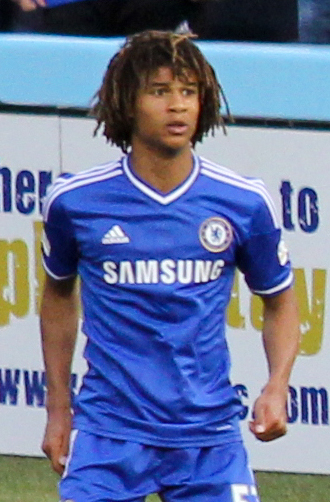
Aké playing for Chelsea in 2013

Aké made his Premier League debut on 26 December 2012 against Norwich City as a 17-year-old, replacing Juan Mata in added time at the end of a 1–0 win at Carrow Road. He made his first start for the club in the FA Cup on 27 February 2013 in a 2–0 win against Championship team Middlesbrough. He was chosen to start in a defensive midfield position for Chelsea in the second leg of their UEFA Europa League quarter-final clash with Rubin Kazan in Russia on 11 April, a match that finished in a 3–2 loss but resulted in a 5–4 aggregate victory. Aké was an unused substitute for Chelsea in the 2013 UEFA Europa League final against Benfica at the Amsterdam Arena on 16 May, which Chelsea won 2–1. He was voted Chelsea's Young Player of the Year on 16 May, and made his first Premier League start three days later in the 2–1 win against Everton at Stamford Bridge on the last matchday of the season.

On 8 August 2013, Aké signed a new five-year contract with Chelsea, lasting until 2018. Following his permanent promotion to the first team, on 21 October 2014, Aké made his UEFA Champions League debut from the substitutes' bench, coming into the match for Cesc Fàbregas in the 60th minute during a 6–0 home win over Maribor, and provided an assist for Eden Hazard's second goal.

==== Loan to Reading ====
On 25 March 2015, Aké was loaned to Championship club Reading for one month, making his first of five appearances against Cardiff City in a 1–1 draw ten days later. Although he only made one league appearance for Chelsea the entire season, as a substitute in a 3–0 loss at West Bromwich Albion on 18 May, manager José Mourinho said Aké would receive a winner's medal for his contribution to the team that season.

==== Loan to Watford ====
On 14 August 2015, Aké completed a season-long loan move to newly promoted Premier League club Watford, after having signed a new five-year contract with Chelsea. Eleven days later, he made his debut for the Hornets in a League Cup second round match against Preston North End, which ended in a 1–0 defeat for his team. Aké played his first Premier League match coming off the substitutes' bench against Newcastle United 19 September 2015, helping Watford hold on for a 2–1 win. He scored his first senior goal on 20 December, opening a 3–0 win over Liverpool at Vicarage Road in the fourth minute, after goalkeeper Ádám Bogdán dropped a corner kick.

During his time with the Hertfordshire side, manager Quique Sánchez Flores primarily deployed Aké as a left-back. His performance and work ethic earned him Watford's Young Player of the Season award.

==== Loan to Bournemouth ====
On 29 June 2016, Aké joined Bournemouth on loan for the 2016–17 season. On 21 August, he made his Bournemouth debut in a 1–0 away defeat against West Ham United, replacing Jordon Ibe following teammate Harry Arter's dismissal after a challenge on Cheikhou Kouyaté. Following the defeat to West Ham, Aké made his full debut against Morecambe in the second round of the EFL Cup on 24 August. On 19 November, in his first Premier League start, Aké scored his first goal for Bournemouth in a 1–0 away victory over Stoke City.

On 4 December 2016, Bournemouth played Liverpool and overturned a 3–1 deficit with 15 minutes to go to win the match 4–3; Aké scoring the winning goal in the 93rd minute, his third Premier League goal and the second against Liverpool.

==== Return to Chelsea ====
Aké was recalled by Chelsea on 8 January 2017, making his first appearance for the club since the recall on 28 January in a 4–0 FA Cup fourth round victory over fellow West London club Brentford. He was also selected to start in Chelsea's 2–0 win over Wolverhampton Wanderers in the fifth round of the same competition on 18 February.

On 22 April 2017, Aké started alongside David Luiz and César Azpilicueta in central defence in Chelsea's 4–2 FA Cup semi-final victory over rivals Tottenham Hotspur at Wembley Stadium.

=== Bournemouth ===
On 30 June 2017, Aké signed a contract with Premier League club Bournemouth on a permanent basis for a club record transfer fee of £20 million, with the player officially re-joining the club the following day, when the 2017 transfer window opened. On 21 July, it was reported his former club Chelsea had inserted a buy-back clause for Aké in his transfer contract.

In his first season after joining Bournemouth permanently, Aké was named as both the club's Players' Player of the Season and Fans' Player of the Season for 2017–18. He played in all 38 of the team's Premier League matches, scoring in a 3–3 draw at home to West Ham United and in a 3–0 away win at his former club Chelsea.

In 2018–19, Aké again appeared in all of Bournemouth's Premier League matches, scoring four times. On 4 May 2019, Aké scored a stoppage time goal against Tottenham Hotspur to give Bournemouth a 1–0 win in their final home match of the season.

On 3 December 2019, Aké captained Bournemouth for the first time in a 1–0 loss at Crystal Palace. Four days later, he suffered a hamstring injury in a 3–0 loss at Liverpool, keeping him out of the team for six matches. A groin injury sustained in a 4–1 win over Leicester City on 15 July 2020 ended his season. On 26 July, on the final day of the 2019–20 Premier League season, Bournemouth were relegated to the EFL Championship after Aston Villa drew with West Ham United.

=== Manchester City ===
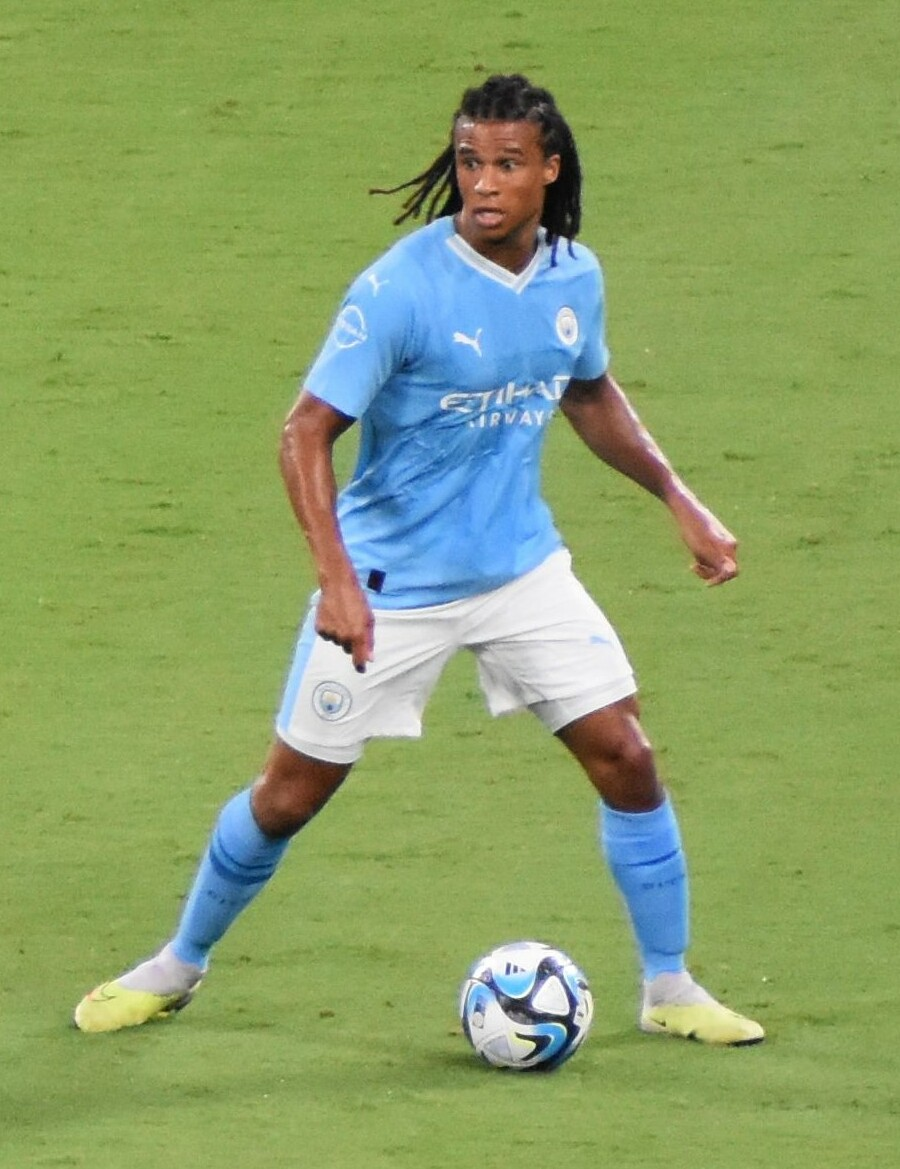
Aké playing for Manchester City in 2023

On 5 August 2020, Aké signed for Manchester City on a five-year contract for £41 million. He started and debuted in City's first game of the season on 21 September, winning 3–1 against Wolverhampton Wanderers away from home in the Premier League. On 27 September 2020, he scored his first goal for City in a 2–5 home defeat against Leicester City. On 3 November 2020, Aké made his Champions League debut for City in a 3–0 home win over Olympiacos in the group stage.

Aké scored his first Champions League goal on 15 September 2021 in a 6–3 win against RB Leipzig. He revealed afterwards that his father, who had been terminally ill, had died shortly after the time he scored.

On 10 June 2023, he was selected in the starting line-up for Manchester City in the Champions League final against Inter Milan, which his club won 1–0 to complete their continental treble. A month later, on 29 July, he extended his contract until 2027.

On 28 September 2023, Aké captained Manchester City for the first time in a 0–1 defeat against Newcastle United in the third round of the EFL Cup.

On 26 January 2024, Aké became Manchester City's first player in history to score at the Tottenham Hotspur Stadium, in a 1–0 fourth round victory over Tottenham Hotspur in the FA Cup.

=== Fenerbahçe ===
On 3 July 2026, Aké joined Süper Lig club Fenerbahçe. He made his debut with the team in a 2026–27 UEFA Champions League second qualifying round match, 1–0 home win against Górnik Zabrze.

== International career ==
Aké has represented the Netherlands at every youth level since his under-15 debut in 2009, making 54 appearances in total. He was a member of the squads that won the UEFA European Under-17 Championship in 2011 and 2012.

Aké was also eligible to represent the Ivory Coast through his father Moise. On 31 May 2017, he made his senior international debut in a friendly match against Morocco, who were beaten 1–2 by the Netherlands. He scored his first goal in a 1–1 draw with Italy on 4 June 2018. Aké was a member of the Netherlands squad for UEFA Euro 2020, appearing twice as a substitute in group matches against Ukraine and Austria.

Aké started all five matches for the Netherlands at the 2022 FIFA World Cup as they reached the quarter-finals, where they were knocked out by eventual winner Argentina in a penalty shootout. In June 2023, he was part of the Netherlands' squad for the 2023 UEFA Nations League Finals, where he started at left back against both Croatia in the semi-final and Italy in the third place play-off. On 29 May 2024, Aké was named in the Netherlands' squad for UEFA Euro 2024.

On 27 May 2026, Aké was named in the Netherlands' squad for the 2026 FIFA World Cup. He came on as a substitute in their opening 2–2 draw against Japan, and was a starter in their 3–1 win against Tunisia and 1–1 draw against Morocco, in which they eventually got eliminated in a penalty shootout.

== Style of play ==
Aké has been praised for his versatility, passing range, reading of the game, ability to play at full back, centre-back, and in defensive midfield, which has been attributed to a good work ethic, professionalism and gifted technique. His calmness on the ball and appearance have led to comparisons to former Dutch international player Ruud Gullit.

Aké is a strong and physical defender who is comfortable in one-on-one situations and is adept at making tackles and interceptions. He is also strong in the air and is capable of winning aerial duels in both boxes. Ake's reading of the game is another key part of his style of play, and he is often in the right position to make crucial blocks and clearances.

== Personal life ==
Aké is a teetotaller.

In the summer of 2022, Aké married Kaylee Ramman, who gave birth to their first child the year after.

== Career statistics ==
=== Club ===
As of match played 20 October 2026

Appearances and goals by club, season and competition
Club	Season	League			National cup (Note: Includes FA Cup, Turkish Cup)		League Cup		Europe		Other		Total	
Club	Season	Division	Apps	Goals	Apps	Goals	Apps	Goals	Apps	Goals	Apps	Goals	Apps	Goals
Chelsea	2012–13	Premier League	3	0	1	0	0	0	2 (Note: Appearances in UEFA Europa League)	0	0	0	6	0
Chelsea	2013–14	Premier League	1	0	0	0	0	0	0	0	—		1	0
Chelsea	2014–15	Premier League	1	0	1	0	2	0	1 (Note: Appearance(s) in UEFA Champions League)	0	—		5	0
Chelsea	2016–17	Premier League	2	0	3	0	—		—		—		5	0
Chelsea	Total		7	0	5	0	2	0	3	0	0	0	17	0
Reading (loan)	2014–15	Championship	5	0	—		—		—		—		5	0
Watford (loan)	2015–16	Premier League	24	1	3	0	1	0	—		—		28	1
Bournemouth (loan)	2016–17	Premier League	10	3	0	0	2	0	—		—		12	3
Bournemouth	2017–18	Premier League	38	2	1	0	1	0	—		—		40	2
Bournemouth	2018–19	Premier League	38	4	0	0	1	0	—		—		39	4
Bournemouth	2019–20	Premier League	29	2	1	0	0	0	—		—		30	2
Bournemouth	Bournemouth total		115	11	2	0	4	0	—		—		121	11
Manchester City	2020–21	Premier League	10	1	0	0	1	0	2	0	—		13	1
Manchester City	2021–22	Premier League	14	2	5	0	1	0	6	1	1 (Note: Appearance in FA Community Shield)	0	27	3
Manchester City	2022–23	Premier League	26	1	3	1	3	1	8	0	1	0	41	3
Manchester City	2023–24	Premier League	29	2	4	1	1	0	7	0	3 (Note: One appearance in UEFA Super Cup, two appearances in FIFA Club World Cup)	0	44	3
Manchester City	2024–25	Premier League	10	0	2	0	1	0	4	0	3 (Note: One appearance in FA Community Shield, two appearances in FIFA Club World Cup)	0	20	0
Manchester City	2025–26	Premier League	18	0	3	0	6	0	5	0	—		32	0
Manchester City	Total		107	6	17	2	13	1	32	1	8	0	177	10
Fenerbahçe	2026–27	Süper Lig	8	0	0	0	—		9	0	0	0	17	0
Career total			266	18	27	2	20	1	44	1	8	0	365	22

=== International ===
As of match played 29 June 2026

Appearances and goals by national team and year
National team	Year	Apps	Goals
Netherlands	2017	5	0
Netherlands	2018	5	1
Netherlands	2019	3	1
Netherlands	2020	6	0
Netherlands	2021	4	0
Netherlands	2022	11	1
Netherlands	2023	8	2
Netherlands	2024	11	0
Netherlands	2025	4	0
Netherlands	2026	5	0
Total		62	5

As of match played 14 June 2026
Netherlands score listed first, score column indicates score after each Aké goal

List of international goals scored by Nathan Aké
No.	Date	Venue	Cap	Opponent	Score	Result	Competition	Ref.
1	4 June 2018	Juventus Stadium, Turin, Italy	7	Italy	1–1	1–1	Friendly	
2	19 November 2019	Johan Cruyff Arena, Amsterdam, Netherlands	13	Estonia	2–0	5–0	UEFA Euro 2020 qualifying	
3	26 March 2022	Johan Cruyff Arena, Amsterdam, Netherlands	21	Denmark	2–1	4–2	Friendly	
4	27 March 2023	De Kuip, Rotterdam, Netherlands	36	Gibraltar	2–0	3–0	UEFA Euro 2024 qualifying	
5	27 March 2023	De Kuip, Rotterdam, Netherlands	36	Gibraltar	3–0	3–0	UEFA Euro 2024 qualifying	

== Honours ==
Chelsea

- Football League Cup: 2014–15
- UEFA Europa League: 2012–13
- FA Cup runner-up: 2016–17

Manchester City

- Premier League: 2020–21, 2021–22, 2022–23, 2023–24
- FA Cup: 2022–23, 2025–26; runner-up: 2023–24
- EFL Cup: 2020–21, 2025–26
- FA Community Shield: 2024
- UEFA Champions League: 2022–23; runner-up: 2020–21
- UEFA Super Cup: 2023
- FIFA Club World Cup: 2023

Netherlands U17

- UEFA European Under-17 Championship: 2011, 2012

Netherlands

- UEFA Nations League runner-up: 2018–19

Individual

- UEFA European Under-17 Championship Team of the Tournament:2012
- Chelsea Young Player of the Year: 2012–13
- Watford Young Player of the Season: 2015–16
- AFC Bournemouth Supporters' Player of the Season: 2017–18
