= 2014–15 Chelsea F.C. season =

English football club season

Chelsea
2014–15 season
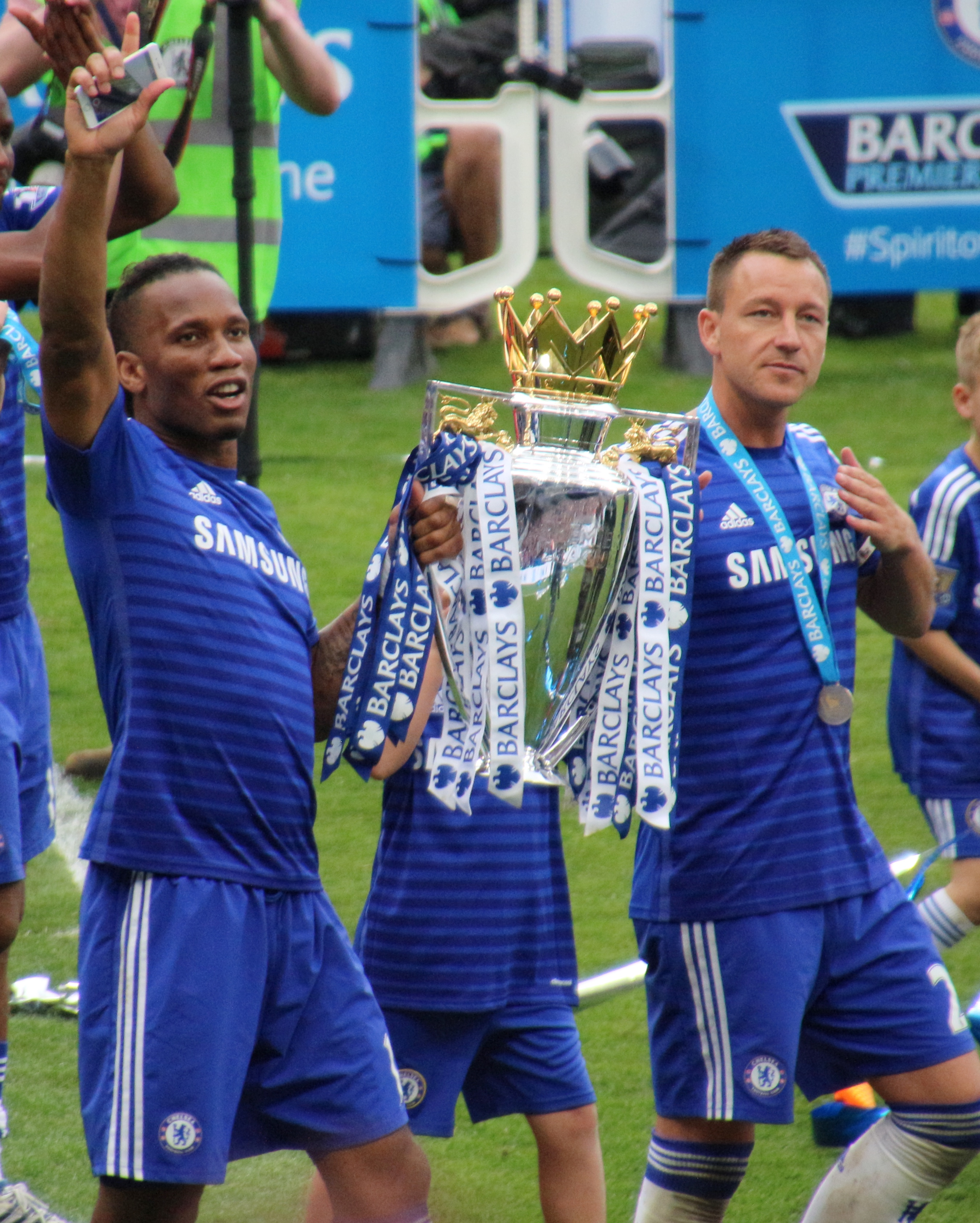
- Didier Drogba (left) and John Terry (right) with the Premier League trophy
- Owner: Roman Abramovich
- Chairman: Bruce Buck
- Manager: José Mourinho
- Stadium: Stamford Bridge
- Premier League: 1st
- FA Cup: Fourth round
- League Cup: Winners
- UEFA Champions League: Round of 16
- Top goalscorer: League: Diego Costa (20); All: Diego Costa (21)
- Highest home attendance: 41,629 vs Burnley (21 February 2015)
- Lowest home attendance: 37,692 vs Paris Saint-Germain (11 March 2015)
- Average home league attendance: 41,548
- Biggest win: 6–0 v Maribor (21 October 2014)
- Biggest defeat: 0–3 v West Bromwich Albion (18 May 2015)
Home colours	Away colours	Third colours

The 2014–15 season was Chelsea Football Club's 101st competitive season, 26th consecutive season in the top flight of English football, 23rd consecutive season in the Premier League, and 109th year in existence as a football club. In addition to the domestic league, Chelsea participated in the UEFA Champions League after qualifying directly for the group stage by finishing third in the league last season. The club secured its fourth Premier League title by beating Crystal Palace on 3 May 2015.

The season was the first since 2000–01 without Frank Lampard, who joined Manchester City.

== Kits ==
Supplier: adidas / Sponsor: Samsung

Home	Home alt.	Away	Third	Goalkeeper 1	vs Sydney FC	Goalkeeper 2	Goalkeeper 3

== Month by month review ==
=== June ===
Midfielder and all-time top scorer Frank Lampard left the Blues after 13 trophy-laden years, having played 648 games and scoring 211 goals. During his Chelsea career, he won 13 trophies, including three Premier Leagues, four FA Cups, two League Cups, one Europa League and one Champions League.

Chelsea announced the signing of former Arsenal midfielder Cesc Fàbregas from Barcelona for £27 million. He was given the number 4 shirt vacated after the departure of David Luiz to Paris Saint-Germain on a five-year contract. David Luiz's transfer was completed just a day after the signing of Fàbregas and the Brazilian left the Blues having played 143 games and scoring 12 goals.

=== July ===
On 1 July, Ashley Cole departed Chelsea after eight years. He left after winning one Premier League, four FA Cups, one League Cup and one Champions League. Along with Cole leaving Stamford Bridge, Samuel Eto'o, Henrique Hilário and Sam Hutchinson left as well.

On the same day, Mark Schwarzer signed a new one-year extension. Chelsea also announced that they agreed a fee with Atlético Madrid for Striker Diego Costa, thought to be in the region of £32 million, and eventually signed him on 15 July.

On 16 July, Chelsea announced that they had agreed a fee with Atlético Madrid for left back Filipe Luís, thought to be for about £16 million, subject to a medical and agreeing personal terms, whilst Beşiktaş announced that they had agreed a deal to sign Demba Ba from the Blues for a reported £4.7 million. Ba left the Blues having played 51 games and scoring 14 goals. The same day, a youthful Chelsea team comfortably defeated League 2 side Wycombe Wanderers 5–0 in their first pre-season friendly at Adams Park in Buckinghamshire.

On 18 July, Filipe Luís officially became a Chelsea player, being given the shirt number 5, vacated by Michael Essien who had worn the number from 2005 until his departure in January 2014. It was also confirmed that his teammate at Atlético Madrid and now Chelsea, Diego Costa, would take the number 19 shirt, vacated by Demba Ba, who had held the number since Paulo Ferreira left the club in the summer of 2013. Also that day, another very youthful Chelsea team narrowly defeated another League 2 side Wimbledon in their second pre-season friendly at Kingsmeadow in southwest London, winning the match 3–2 after being two goals down at half-time; the comeback was aided by a few senior players brought on for the second-half. The next day, Chelsea announced that Filipe Luís will get the shirt number 3 while the shirt number 5 will be given to 19-year-old French defender Kurt Zouma.

Chelsea legend Didier Drogba re-signed for Chelsea from Galatasaray for free on a one-year deal. Drogba's last kick for the Blues was the final penalty in the 2012 UEFA Champions League Final, which won the Champions League for Chelsea for the first time. In the new season, Drogba will wear the number 15 shirt; his former number 11 shirt had been given to Oscar. Drogba, however, reclaimed his former number 11 after Oscar was handed number 8, last worn by Frank Lampard.

Romelu Lukaku departed the Blues for £28 million to Everton, leaving after playing 12 games for Chelsea and scoring zero goals, while Ryan Bertrand was sent on a season-long loan to Southampton, his sixth loan spell for the Blues.

=== August ===
Defensive midfielder Oriol Romeu signed on a season long loan for Bundesliga club VfB Stuttgart. Chelsea travelled to Istanbul to take on Fenerbahçe and Beşiktaş in a small three-team tournament. Chelsea beat Fenerbahçe 2–0 with goals from Diego Costa and Branislav Ivanović. The Blues, however, then lost to Beşiktaş 1–0, also opposing former Blue, Demba Ba.

Chelsea began their 2014–15 Premier League campaign with a 1–3 victory against Burnley on 18 August at Turf Moor. Chelsea surrendered the first goal in the 13th minute, but three minutes later, Costa smashed home a close-range shot to level the score. A pass from Cesc Fàbregas then set up an André Schürrle goal to break the deadlock, and Ivanović provided the final goal of the match from a corner in the 34th minute. This match marked the first competitive action for new signings Costa, Fàbregas and Thibaut Courtois, who started in goal after a three-year loan spell at Atlético Madrid. Didier Drogba also made his return appearance to the Chelsea squad, coming off the bench in the second-half.

Chelsea won their first competitive home match with a 2–0 victory against Leicester City on 24 August at Stamford Bridge. Costa scored his second goal in two matches followed by Eden Hazard's first goal of the season. Courtois claimed his first clean sheet of his Chelsea career.

On 29 August, Fernando Torres signed a two-year loan deal with Milan. Chelsea's next game was a nine-goal thriller away against Everton, a game which Chelsea won 3–6, with Costa scoring a brace.

On 31 August, Loïc Rémy transferred to Chelsea from Queens Park Rangers for £10.5 million on a four-year deal.

Position at the end of August
Pos	Team	Pld	W	D	L	GF	GA	GD	Pts	Qualification
1	Chelsea	3	3	0	0	11	4	+7	9	Qualification for the Champions League group stage
2	Swansea City	3	3	0	0	6	1	+5	9	Qualification for the Champions League group stage
3	Aston Villa	3	2	1	0	3	1	+2	7	Qualification for the Champions League group stage
4	Manchester City	3	2	0	1	5	3	+2	6	Qualification for the Champions League play-off round
5	Liverpool	3	2	0	1	6	4	+2	6	Qualification for the Europa League group stage

=== September ===
On transfer deadline day, Chelsea sent three players on loan—Jamal Blackman joined Patrick Bamford on loan at Middlesbrough, Marco van Ginkel signed on a year-long loan at Milan and Nathaniel Chalobah joined Premier League club Burnley. Chelsea have currently sent 26 players out on loan, the most in the Premier League. After the international break, Diego Costa was named Player of the Month for August after scoring four goals in three games and sending Chelsea to the top of the table.

On 13 September, Chelsea played their second game of the season at Stamford Bridge against Swansea City. Chelsea won the game 4–2 with Costa scoring his first hat-trick for Chelsea and Rémy scoring on his debut.

Chelsea began their 2014–15 Champions League with a 1–1 draw at home to Schalke 04. Fàbregas grabbed his first Chelsea goal but it was cancelled out by Klaas-Jan Huntelaar, who scored with 28 minutes left to secure a point for Schalke. Chelsea dropped their first points of the season. Chelsea dropped their first points of the 2014–15 Premier League season as they drew 1–1 to reigning champions Manchester City at the City of Manchester Stadium. In a close fought-encounter, Pablo Zabaleta was sent off after 66 minutes, giving Chelsea the advantage and allowing Schürrle to givethe Blues the lead. With only five minutes to go, Chelsea looked like they were going to stretch their winning run to five games, however former Blues vice-captain and all-time record goalscorer Frank Lampard equalised for City in the 85th minute. Despite the draw, Chelsea still remained three points clear at the top of the table on 13 points.

In Chelsea's next match, they knocked Bolton Wanderers out of the League Cup third round after winning 2–1 thanks to a debut goal from defender Zouma and a strike from Oscar. The result meant Chelsea faced Shrewsbury Town in the League Cup fourth round. Chelsea's last game in the league for September came against Aston Villa, a game which was won 3–0, meaning they finished September at the top of the table. It was announced that Chelsea had enquired about temporarily relocating to Twickenham Stadium whilst redeveloping Stamford Bridge. The final game of the month was in the Champions League against Sporting CP in Portugal. Nemanja Matić scored the only goal of the game, giving Chelsea a 0–1 win and leaving them top of their group

Position at the end of September
Pos	Team	Pld	W	D	L	GF	GA	GD	Pts	Qualification
1	Chelsea	6	5	1	0	19	7	+12	16	Qualification for the Champions League group stage
2	Southampton	6	4	1	1	11	4	+7	13	Qualification for the Champions League group stage
3	Manchester City	6	3	2	1	12	7	+5	11	Qualification for the Champions League group stage
4	Arsenal	6	2	4	0	11	7	+4	10	Qualification for the Champions League play-off round
5	Swansea City	6	3	1	2	8	6	+2	10	Qualification for the Europa League group stage

=== October ===
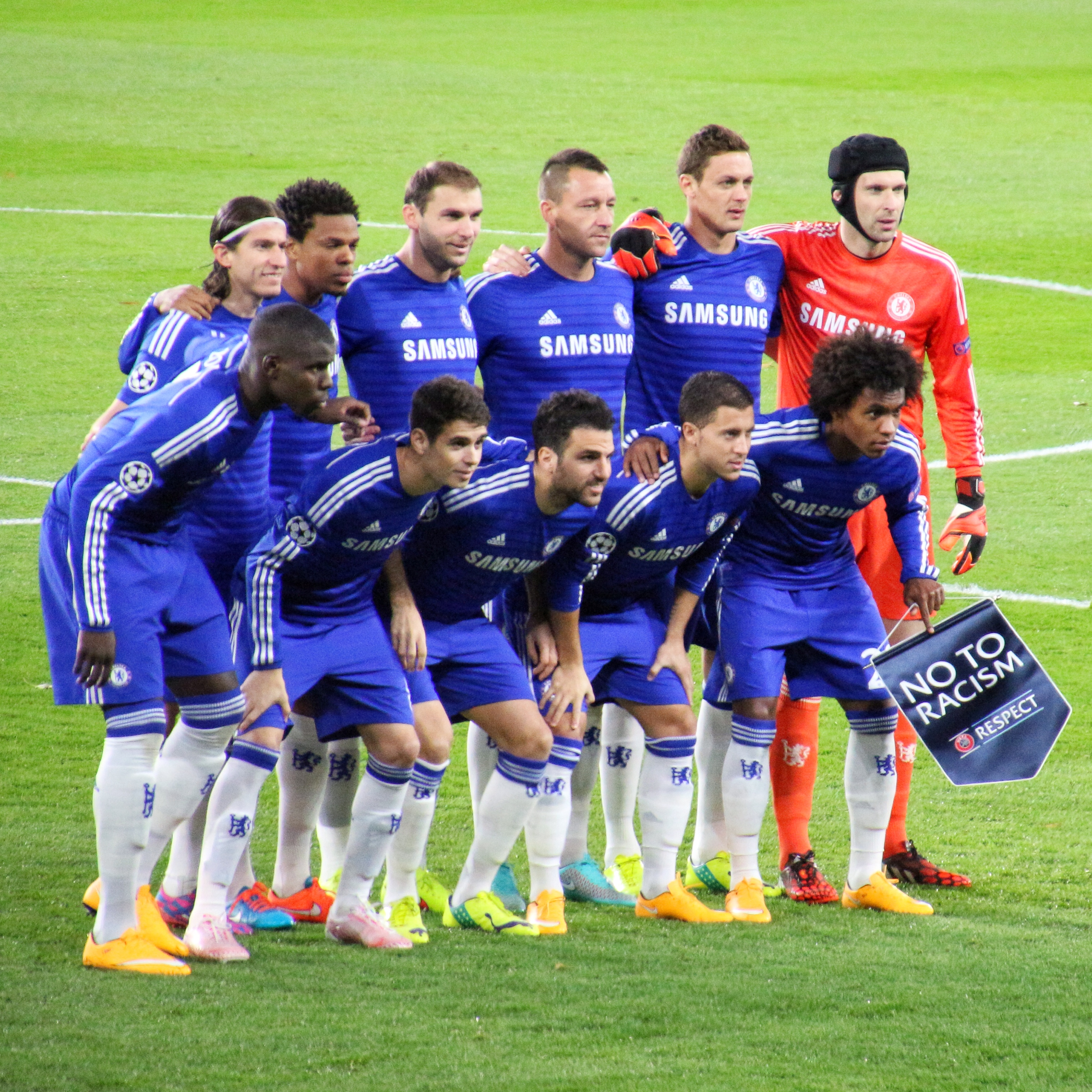
Chelsea's starting eleven against Maribor in the UEFA Champions League.

Chelsea began October with a derby match and a 2–0 victory over local rivals Arsenal. A first half penalty by Eden Hazard and the ninth goal of the season for Diego Costa sent the Blues five points clear at the top of the table ahead of the international break.

Chelsea preserved their five-point lead at the top as they defeated Crystal Palace at Selhurst Park, 1–2. Three days later, they continued their form into the Champions League defeating Maribor 6–0 at Stamford Bridge. Goals from Rémy, Drogba, Terry an own goal and two from Hazard sent Chelsea on their way to secure a record Champions League win, which also maintained their unbeaten start in all competitions this season. On 22 October, Chelsea's chief executive Ron Gourlay left the club, having held the position since 2009.

Chelsea drew for the second time in the league season away to Manchester United. Drogba's powerful header gave the Blues the lead, but a last minute equaliser from Robin van Persie meant the sides shared the points. The result rendered Chelsea four points clear of second-placed Southampton at the end of October.

Diego Costa, Thibaut Courtois and Eden Hazard were among the nominees for the 2014 FIFA Ballon d'Or, while José Mourinho was nominated for the 2014 FIFA World Coach of the Year.

In the Blues final game in October, they edged past League Two side Shrewsbury Town in the Football League Cup thanks to a third goal in three games from Drogba and an own goal. In the next round, they faced Derby County away.

Position at the end of October
Pos	Team	Pld	W	D	L	GF	GA	GD	Pts	Qualification
1	Chelsea	9	7	2	0	24	9	+15	23	Qualification for the Champions League group stage
2	Southampton	9	6	1	2	20	5	+15	19	Qualification for the Champions League group stage
3	Manchester City	9	5	2	2	19	10	+9	17	Qualification for the Champions League group stage
4	West Ham United	9	5	1	3	17	12	+5	16	Qualification for the Champions League play-off round
5	Arsenal	9	3	5	1	15	11	+4	14	Qualification for the Europa League group stage

=== November ===
Chelsea's first game of the month came against local rivals Queens Park Rangers, a brilliant first half goal from Oscar and a second-half penalty from Eden Hazard gave Chelsea a 2–1 win. Four days later, Chelsea came from behind to draw away to Maribor, with Matić scoring 20 minutes from full-time to keep Chelsea top of the group.

Chelsea's unbeaten start continued as they defeated Liverpool 1–2 at Anfield. Emre Can gave the Reds the lead before goals from Gary Cahill and Diego Costa sent the Blues seven points clear before the international break.

A dominating performance against West Bromwich Albion sent kept Chelsea seven points clear at the top of the table, thanks to goals from Costa and Hazard. The Blues secured qualification for the Second round of the Champions League after hammering Schalke 04 0–5 at the Veltins-Arena. Chelsea's final game in November was a 0–0 stalemate away at Sunderland. Despite Chelsea failing to score for the first time in the season, they went six points clear of defending champions Manchester City at November's end.

Position at the end of November
Pos	Team	Pld	W	D	L	GF	GA	GD	Pts	Qualification
1	Chelsea	13	10	3	0	30	11	+19	33	Qualification for the Champions League group stage
2	Manchester City	13	8	3	2	27	13	+14	27	Qualification for the Champions League group stage
3	Southampton	13	8	2	3	24	9	+15	26	Qualification for the Champions League group stage
4	Manchester United	13	6	4	3	22	15	+7	22	Qualification for the Champions League play-off round
5	West Ham United	13	6	3	4	21	16	+5	21	Qualification for the Europa League group stage

=== December ===
Chelsea bounced back from their 0–0 draw to Sunderland to defeat London rivals Tottenham Hotspur 3–0 at Stamford Bridge. Goals from Hazard and Drogba, in for the suspended Costa, gave Chelsea a first half lead, before a goal from Rémy settled the game.

Chelsea suffered their first defeat of the 2014–15 season after losing 2–1 to Newcastle United at St James' Park. The Blues fell behind to two Papiss Cissé goals and Drogba pulled one back, but Mourinho's side failed to secure the equaliser as Manchester City closed the gap at the top to three points.

With the defeat to Newcastle behind them, the Blues defeated Sporting CP 3–1 at Stamford Bridge. Goals from Cesc Fàbregas, Schürrle, and John Obi Mikel sent Chelsea through to the next round as group winners. The Blues bounced back in the Premier League to regain a three-point advantage over Manchester City after dispatching Hull City 2–0 at Stamford Bridge with goals from Hazard and Costa.

Paris Saint-Germain faced Chelsea in the Champions League Round of 16. The first leg was held in Paris on Tuesday 17 February, and the second leg at Stamford Bridge on Wednesday 11 March. They faced each other in the 2013–14 Quarter Finals, where the Blues went through on away goals thanks to an 87th-minute goal from Demba Ba.

In the League Cup Quarter Finals Chelsea progressed by beating Derby County 3–1 at the iPro Stadium, where they faced 2012 winners Liverpool. A superb victory against Stoke City meant the Blues were on top at Christmas, goals from captain John Terry and Cesc Fàbregas gave José Mourinho a win against adversary Mark Hughes.

Terry scored for the second successive game as the Blues continued their form and defeated West Ham United 2–0 at Stamford Bridge. The Blues finished 2014 with a 1–1 draw away to Southampton, Sadio Mané's early goal was cancelled out by Eden Hazard and despite the Blues persistence they couldn't break down a resilient Saints. Despite the draw Chelsea regained a four-point lead over Manchester City as they slipped up at home to Burnley.

Position at the end of December
Pos	Team	Pld	W	D	L	GF	GA	GD	Pts	Qualification
1	Chelsea	19	14	4	1	40	13	+27	46	Qualification for the Champions League group stage
2	Manchester City	19	13	4	2	41	17	+24	43	Qualification for the Champions League group stage
3	Manchester United	19	10	6	3	32	18	+14	36	Qualification for the Champions League group stage
4	Southampton	19	10	3	6	32	15	+17	33	Qualification for the Champions League play-off round
5	Arsenal	19	9	6	4	34	23	+11	33	Qualification for the Europa League group stage

=== January ===
Chelsea started 2015 in disappointing fashion, falling to a 5–3 away defeat to Tottenham Hotspur. Five goals was the most José Mourinho had conceded as a manager in the Premier League, but despite the loss, the Blues remained top of the league on alphabetical order.

Loanees Patrick Bamford and Alex Davey had their loan deals extended to the end of the season, to Middlesbrough and Scunthorpe United respectively, while John Swift returned from his unsuccessful loan spell to Rotherham United and was subsequently sent to Swindon Town. Striker Alex Kiwomya was also sent to Barnsley on a one-month loan.

Chelsea started their FA Cup campaign with a 3–0 victory over Watford, with goals from Willian, Rémy and Zouma. Despite a superb first-half performance from Newcastle United and in particular Rémy Cabella, the Blues ran out 2–0 winners after goals from Oscar and Diego Costa.

José Mourinho recorded his biggest Premier League away win as Chelsea manager as the Blues hammered Swansea City 5–0, thanks to two doubles from Costa, Oscar and a goal from Schürrle. A week later, Chelsea threw away a two-goal lead and lost to League One side Bradford City in the FA Cup fourth round.

Chelsea progressed to the League Cup Final after defeating Liverpool on aggregate 2–1 in the Semi-finals. An early penalty from Hazard was cancelled out by a Raheem Sterling goal in the first leg, leaving the game 1–1 heading into the second leg at Stamford Bridge. The second leg finished 0–0 after 90 minutes before an Ivanović header after 94 minutes sent the Blues to the League Cup Final at Wembley to face Tottenham.

Striker Costa was banned for a stamp on Liverpool midfielder Emre Can, missing games against Manchester City, Aston Villa and Everton.

Chelsea finished January with a 1–1 draw at Stamford Bridge with second place Manchester City. The Blues took the lead through Rémy before David Silva equalised to prevent the lead at the top increasing to eight points.

Position at the end of January
Pos	Team	Pld	W	D	L	GF	GA	GD	Pts	Qualification
1	Chelsea	23	16	5	2	52	20	+32	53	Qualification for the Champions League group stage
2	Manchester City	23	14	6	3	46	23	+23	48	Qualification for the Champions League group stage
3	Manchester United	23	12	7	4	38	21	+17	43	Qualification for the Champions League group stage
4	Southampton	22	13	3	6	37	16	+21	42	Qualification for the Champions League play-off round
5	Tottenham Hotspur	23	12	4	7	35	30	+5	40	Qualification for the Europa League group stage

=== February ===
Fiorentina winger Juan Cuadrado signed for Chelsea for an initial fee of £23.3 million. Cuadrado played a vital role in Colombia's run to the World Cup quarter-finals. Schürrle moved to Wolfsburg on a £22 million deal, having played 65 games for Chelsea and scoring 14 goals, including vital goals against Paris Saint-Germain and Manchester City. Additionally, left back Ryan Bertrand made the permanent move to Southampton for £10 million after having spent the first half of the season on loan at the club.

Chelsea moved seven points clear of second-placed Manchester City after a hard-fought win over Aston Villa at Villa Park. The Blues then won 0–1 for the first time in all competitions after a late goal from Willian gave Chelsea a victory over Everton to keep the lead their lead at the top of the table at seven points.

Eden Hazard signed a new five-and-a-half-year deal with Chelsea, keeping him at the club until 2020. He had played 147 games to date and scored 44 goals while also winning the 2012–13 UEFA Europa League with the Blues.

Edinson Cavani's equaliser in the 54th minute denied Chelsea victory against PSG in the first leg of the Champions League round of 16. Ivanović gave the Blues the lead and looked set to give them victory at the Parc des Princes, but Edinson Cavani equalised, and it could have been worse for Chelsea yet Thibaut Courtois made a series of top saves to keep the Blues in the tie for the second leg at Stamford Bridge.

The Blues' final game in February was mired in controversy, as official Martin Atkinson had a poor game at Stamford Bridge. Ivanović gave Chelsea the lead, but two stonewall penalties were not given in Chelsea's favour, one for a handball and another for a blatant two-handed push on Costa. Matić was then sent off for retaliating to a challenge from Burnley's Ashley Barnes before Ben Mee equalised in the 81st minute. Chelsea appealed Matić's red card, and The Football Association reduced the ban from three games to two.

Two Chelsea players left the club—Lewis Baker left on loan to Milton Keynes Dons until the end of the season, while Hazard's younger brother Thorgan Hazard moved permanently to Borussia Mönchengladbach, signing a deal to keep him at the German club until 2020.

Position at the end of February
Pos	Team	Pld	W	D	L	GF	GA	GD	Pts	Qualification
1	Chelsea	26	18	6	2	56	22	+34	60	Qualification for the Champions League group stage
2	Manchester City	26	16	7	3	56	25	+31	55	Qualification for the Champions League group stage
3	Manchester United	27	14	8	5	45	25	+20	50	Qualification for the Champions League group stage
4	Arsenal	26	14	6	6	49	29	+20	48	Qualification for the Champions League play-off round
5	Southampton	27	14	4	9	38	20	+18	46	Qualification for the Europa League group stage

=== March ===
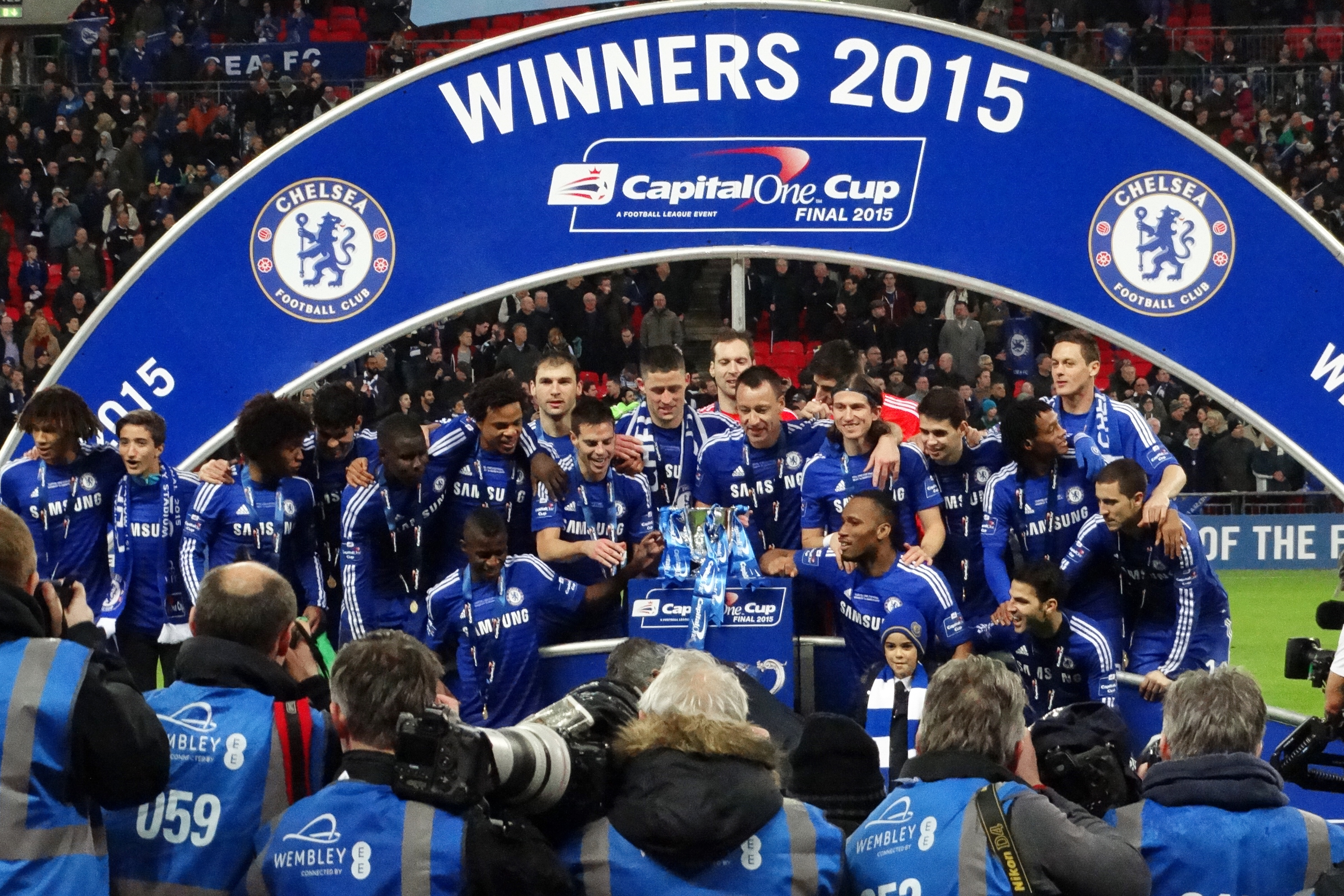
Chelsea players celebrating winning the Capital One Cup.

Chelsea's first game in March won José Mourinho his first trophy on his return to Chelsea after the Blues defeated Spurs 2–0 in the 2015 League Cup Final. Zouma replaced the suspended Matić in defensive midfield, and Petr Čech replaced Thibaut Courtois in goal. A goal from captain John Terry just before half-time sent Chelsea on their way and a Costa deflected effort, originally credited as a Kyle Walker own goal, gave the Blues the win. Credit to Costa was later confirmed on the official match scorecard on the Capital One Cup's website. Mourinho's win was his third Football League Cup and Chelsea's fifth overall; this win was also Čech, Drogba and Terry's third win. It was Chelsea's first domestic cup since the 2011–12 FA Cup and Chelsea's first major trophy in two years. The win also meant that Chelsea qualified for the 2015–16 UEFA Europa League third qualifying round.

A Hazard header in the first-half gave the Blues victory over London rivals West Ham. The win kept the gap at the top at five points over Manchester City, with Chelsea having a game in hand.

Chelsea produced their worst performance of the season in arguably their most important game of the season. Ten-man PSG knocked out the Blues on away goals, and despite star forward Zlatan Ibrahimović being sent off after only 30 minutes, and Chelsea could not find a breakthrough with over 60 minutes with the man advantage. Goals from Cahill and Hazard looked to send the disappointing Blues through, but former Chelsea defender David Luiz scored in normal time and Thiago Silva scored in extra time to condemn Chelsea to defeat.

The Blues disappointing form continued as they drew 1–1 to Southampton at Stamford Bridge. Despite the draw, Chelsea extended their lead at the top to six points due to Manchester City's slip at Burnley. Chelsea rounded off March with a hard-fought 3–2 win over Hull City, early goals from Costa and Hazard sent the Blues on their way before two goals in the space of a minute sent Hull City level at the break. Costa went off with an injury after 75 minutes and his replacement Rémy scored moments later to send Chelsea six points clear with a game in hand.

Club captain Terry signed a new, one-year deal with the Blues, keeping him at the club until June 2016. Playing 650 times scoring 59 goals while also lifting a record 15 trophies, he is the most successful captain in the club's history.

Position at the end of March
Pos	Team	Pld	W	D	L	GF	GA	GD	Pts	Qualification
1	Chelsea (T)	29	20	7	2	61	25	+36	67	Qualification for the Champions League group stage
2	Manchester City	30	18	7	5	62	28	+34	61	Qualification for the Champions League group stage
3	Arsenal	30	18	6	6	58	31	+27	60	Qualification for the Champions League group stage
4	Manchester United	30	17	8	5	51	26	+25	59	Qualification for the Champions League play-off round
5	Liverpool	30	16	6	8	42	30	+12	54	Qualification for the Europa League group stage

(T) Qualified, but not yet for the particular phase indicated

=== April ===
The Blues started April with a hard-fought 2–1 home win against Stoke City. A first half penalty kick from Hazard sent Chelsea on their way before Charlie Adam scored from 65 yards to equalise, yet for the second game, Rémy netted a second-half winner. A week later, Chelsea battled to a 0–1 win at QPR, Fàbregas scoring with the Blues' only shot on target in the 88th minute to send them seven points clear of second-place Arsenal.

The Chelsea youth team won the second-ever 2014–15 UEFA Youth League, defeating Shakhtar Donetsk 3–2 in the final. Dominic Solanke finished as the competition's top scorer with 12 goals.

Hazard and Costa were then nominated for the PFA Players' Player of the Year, while Thibaut Courtois and Hazard were also nominated for the PFA Young Player of the Year, an accolade which Hazard received in the previous season; it was the third consecutive year that Hazard had been nominated in the PFA Players' Player of the Year and PFA Young Player of the Year.

A 1–0 home win over Manchester United extended the Blues lead at the top of the table to ten points. Hazard notched the only goal of the game in the 38th minute, after good work from Fàbregas and Oscar. Despite Manchester United having 70 per cent of the ball's possession, they rarely troubled Courtois' goal and the Blues held resolute to record a 13th win in 16 games at Stamford Bridge.

Chelsea had a club-record six players named in the 2014–15 PFA Team of the Year. Defenders Ivanović, Terry and Cahill, and Hazard, Matić and Costa were all included, the latter two for the first time. Ivanović and Cahill had both been named once before, Terry received the honour for the fourth time and Hazard had his third consecutive nomination. Later that evening, the Belgian also won the PFA Player of the Year award.

Arsenal faced Chelsea in a match at the top of the table on 26 April. The match finished a 0–0 draw; Chelsea and the Blues regained their ten-point lead at the top of the table.

Following their victory in the 2014–15 UEFA Youth League, Chelsea Youth Team record a 5–2 aggregate victory over the Manchester City Elite Development Squad in the 2014–15 FA Youth Cup Final. The young Blues won the FA Youth Cup for a second consecutive season thanks to goals from Tammy Abraham, Dominic Solanke and Isaiah Brown over two legs.

The Blues rounded off April with a 3–1 away win over Leicester City. Despite conceding first, goals from Drogba, Terry and Ramires sent Chelsea 13 points clear at the top of the table, guaranteeing them a spot in 2015–16 UEFA Champions League group stage.

Position at the end of April
Pos	Team	Pld	W	D	L	GF	GA	GD	Pts	Qualification
1	Chelsea (Q)	34	24	8	2	68	27	+41	80	Qualification for the Champions League group stage
2	Manchester City	34	20	7	7	70	36	+34	67	Qualification for the Champions League group stage
3	Arsenal	33	20	7	6	63	32	+31	67	Qualification for the Champions League group stage
4	Manchester United	34	19	8	7	58	33	+25	65	Qualification for the Champions League play-off round
5	Liverpool	34	17	7	10	45	35	+10	58	Qualification for the Europa League group stage

(Q) Qualified for the phase indicated

=== May ===
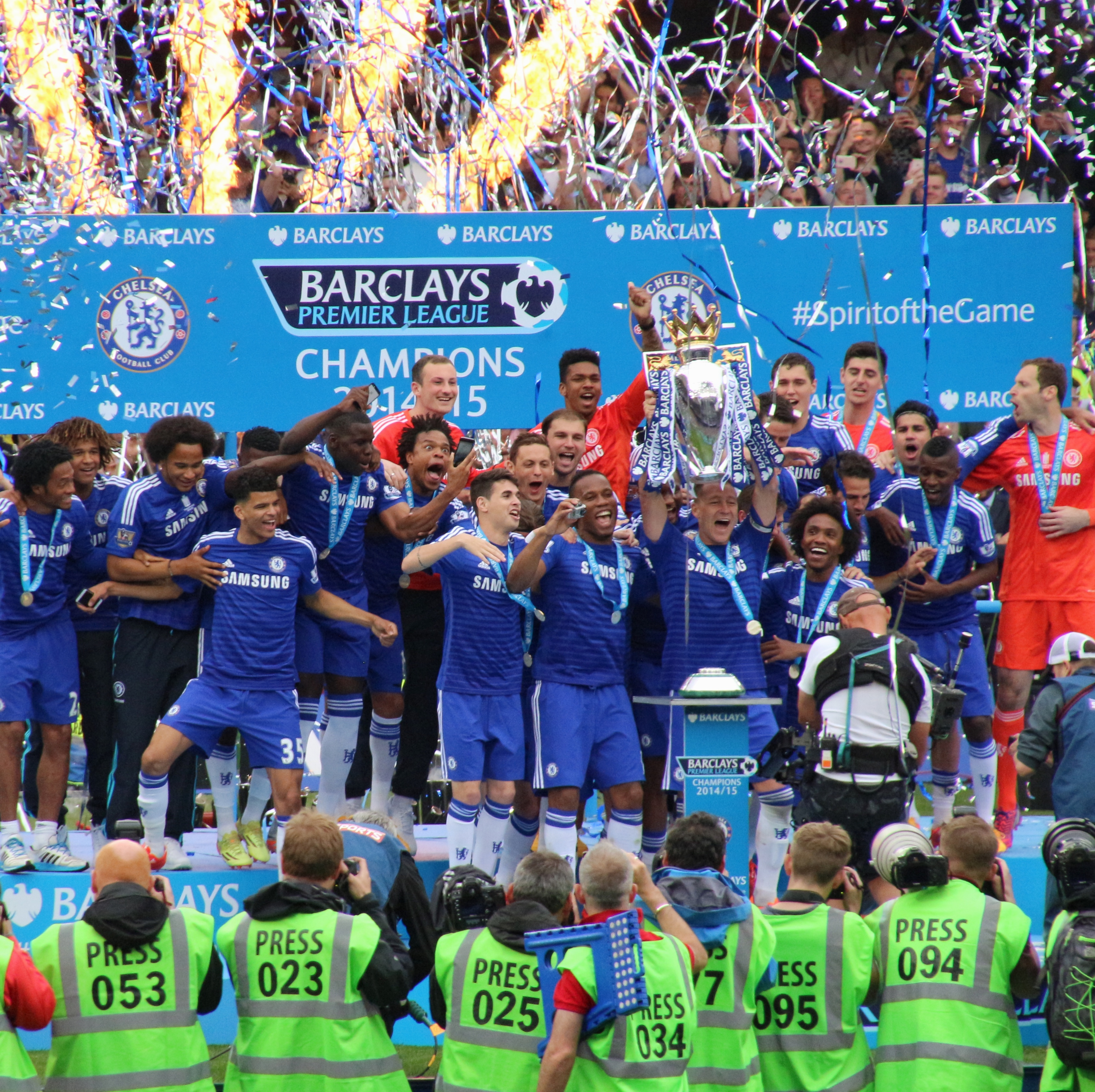
Terry lifting the Premier League trophy after the last game.

Chelsea secured their fourth Premier League trophy and their fifth top division trophy overall, after a 1–0 victory over Crystal Palace. A Hazard goal was enough to send the Blues 16 points clear and unable to be caught. This was José Mourinho's third Premier League and eighth title overall. The title victory also put him level with Arsène Wenger in the second-most Premier League wins behind Alex Ferguson. Chelsea had spent 253 days at the top of the Premier League table to date this season, and only Chelsea in 2005–06 (257 days) and Manchester United in 1993–94 (262 days) had been at the top of the table for longer in a single campaign. Due to the Blues securing the title against Palace, Chelsea spent 274 days at the top of the table and set a new record.. Mourinho continued his unbeaten run against Liverpool after drawing 1–1. The Blues goal came from Terry, who broke the record for the most goals by a defender in Premier League history. The Blues last away game of the year was a 0–3 defeat at West Brom. However, the game made no difference to either of the teams' league positions, yet it gave Mourinho the chance to assess youngsters Ruben Loftus-Cheek, Nathan Aké and Isaiah Brown in a league match. The Blues finished their season with a 3–1 victory over Sunderland at Stamford Bridge. Despite falling behind to an early goal, Costa and Rémy gave Chelsea all three points.

Chelsea finished the season as 2014–15 Premier League champions and winners of the 2014–15 Football League Cup. Mourinho's side broke numerous records on their way to the title, most significantly remaining top of the Premier League for 274 days and recording the fewest losses in all competitions. Terry became the first player since Gary Pallister to play in every minute of the title-winning campaign. Striker Drogba announced he was leaving the club for a second time. He left the Blues having scored a total of 164 goals in 381 appearances, and winning numerous trophies including the Premier League and UEFA Champions League.

Mourinho won the Premier League Manager of the Season and LMA Manager of the Year awards, while Hazard won a triple award at the end of the season, with the PFA Player of the Year, FWA Footballer of the Year and the Premier League Player of the Season awards. And at the end of season club awards, Zouma won the young player of the year, and Oscar won the goal of the year for his stunner with the outside of the box against QPR. Hazard won a second consecutive Chelsea Player of the Year and won the Players' Player of the Year award.

==== Final league position ====
Pos	Team	Pld	W	D	L	GF	GA	GD	Pts	Qualification or relegation
1	Chelsea (C)	38	26	9	3	73	32	+41	87	Qualification for the Champions League group stage
2	Manchester City	38	24	7	7	83	38	+45	79	Qualification for the Champions League group stage
3	Arsenal	38	22	9	7	71	36	+35	75	Qualification for the Champions League group stage
4	Manchester United	38	20	10	8	62	37	+25	70	Qualification for the Champions League play-off round
5	Tottenham Hotspur	38	19	7	12	58	53	+5	64	Qualification for the Europa League group stage (Note: Since winners of the 2014–15 FA Cup, Arsenal, and winners of the 2014–15 Football League Cup, Chelsea, qualified for the Champions League based on league position, the spot awarded to the FA Cup winners (Europa League group stage) was passed to the sixth-placed team, Liverpool, and the spot awarded to the League Cup winners (Europa League third qualifying round) was passed to the seventh-placed team, Southampton, since those teams were the first teams in the table not already qualified for any European competition.)

Source: Barclays Premier League
Rules for classification: 1) Points; 2) Goal difference; 3) Goals scored; 4) Play-offs (only if needed to decide champion, teams for relegation or teams for UEFA competitions).
(C) Champions

== Club ==
=== Coaching staff ===
Position	Staff
Manager	(Portugal) José Mourinho
Assistant Manager	(England) Steve Holland
Assistant Manager	(Portugal) Silvino Louro
Assistant Manager	(Portugal) Rui Faria
Technical Director	(Nigeria) Michael Emenalo
Goalkeeper Coach	(France) Christophe Lollichon
Fitness Coach	(England) Chris Jones
Assistant Fitness Coach	(Spain) Carlos Lalin
Senior Opposition Scout	(England) Mick McGiven
Medical Director	(Spain) Paco Biosca
Assistant Medical Director	(Gibraltar) Eva Carneiro
Head of Youth Development	(England) Neil Bath
Under 21 Team Manager	(England) Adi Viveash
Under 18 Team Manager	(England) Joe Edwards
Head of Match Analysis/Scout	(England) James Melbourne
International Head Coach	(England) Dermot Drummy

Source: Chelsea F.C.

=== Other information ===
Owner	(Russia) Roman Abramovich
Chairman	(United States) Bruce Buck
Chief Executive	(England) Ron Gourlay (until 22 October)
Directors	(Russia) (Canada) Marina Granovskaia (Ukraine) (Canada) Eugene Tenenbaum
Ground (capacity and dimensions)	Stamford Bridge (41,623 / 103x67 metres)
Training Ground	Cobham Training Centre

Source: Chelsea F.C.

== First team squad ==
As of 24 May 2015.

Squad No.	Name	Nationality	Position(s)	Since	Date of birth (age)	Signed from	Games played	Goals Scored
Goalkeepers
1	Petr Čech	(Czech Republic)	GK	2004	20 May 1982 (aged 33)	(France) Rennes	493	0
13	Thibaut Courtois	(Belgium)	GK	2011	11 May 1992 (aged 23)	(Belgium) Genk	39	0
46	Jamal Blackman	(England)	GK	2012	27 October 1993 (aged 21)	Chelsea Academy	0	0
Defenders
2	Branislav Ivanović	(Serbia)	RB / CB	2008	22 February 1984 (aged 31)	(Russia) Lokomotiv Moscow	317	31
3	Filipe Luís	(Brazil)	LB	2014	5 August 1985 (aged 29)	(Spain) Atlético Madrid	25	1
5	Kurt Zouma	(France)	CB / RB	2014	27 October 1994 (aged 20)	(France) Saint-Étienne	25	2
6	Nathan Aké	(Netherlands)	CB	2012	18 February 1995 (aged 20)	Chelsea Academy	12	0
24	Gary Cahill	(England)	CB	2012	19 December 1985 (aged 29)	(England) Bolton Wanderers	157	13
26	John Terry (c)	(England)	CB	1998	7 December 1980 (aged 34)	Chelsea Academy	637	61
28	César Azpilicueta	(Spain)	RB / LB	2012	28 August 1989 (aged 25)	(France) Marseille	131	1
31	Andreas Christensen	(Denmark)	CB	2014	10 April 1996 (aged 19)	Chelsea Academy	3	0
Midfielders
4	Cesc Fàbregas	(Spain)	CM / AM	2014	4 May 1987 (aged 28)	(Spain) Barcelona	46	5
7	Ramires	(Brazil)	CM / RM	2010	24 March 1987 (aged 28)	(Portugal) Benfica	230	31
8	Oscar	(Brazil)	AM / RW / CM	2012	9 September 1991 (aged 23)	(Brazil) Internacional	152	30
10	Eden Hazard	(Belgium)	LW / AM / RW	2012	7 January 1991 (aged 24)	(France) Lille	162	49
12	John Obi Mikel	(Nigeria)	DM / CM	2006	22 April 1987 (aged 28)	(Norway) Lyn	338	5
21	Nemanja Matić	(Serbia)	DM / CM	2014	1 August 1988 (aged 26)	(Portugal) Benfica	70	3
22	Willian	(Brazil)	AM / RW	2013	9 August 1988 (aged 26)	(Russia) Anzhi Makhachkala	90	8
23	Juan Cuadrado	(Colombia)	RW / RWB / AM	2015	26 May 1988 (aged 26)	(Italy) Fiorentina	13	0
36	Ruben Loftus-Cheek	(England)	CM	2014	23 January 1996 (aged 19)	Chelsea Academy	3	0
37	Isaiah Brown	(England)	RW / LW / CF	2015	7 January 1997 (aged 18)	(England) West Brom	1	0
Strikers
11	Didier Drogba (vc)	(Ivory Coast)	CF	2014	11 March 1978 (aged 37)	(Turkey) Galatasaray	381	164
18	Loïc Rémy	(France)	CF	2014	2 January 1987 (aged 28)	(England) QPR	26	9
19	Diego Costa	(Spain)	CF	2014	7 October 1988 (aged 26)	(Spain) Atlético Madrid	37	20

== New contracts ==
No.	Pos	Player	Contract length	Contract end	Date	Source
26	CB	(England) John Terry	1 year	2015	13 May 2014	
59	CB	(Nigeria) Kenneth Omeruo	4 years	2018	28 May 2014	
46	GK	(England) Jamal Blackman	5 years	2019	5 June 2014	
23	GK	(Australia) Mark Schwarzer	1 year	2015	1 July 2014	
40	GK	(Croatia) Matej Delač	2 years	2016	12 July 2014	
20	CM	(Spain) Oriol Romeu	3 years	2017	17 July 2014	
34	CM	(England) Lewis Baker	5 years	2019	29 August 2014	
28	RB	(Spain) César Azpilicueta	5 years	2019	2 September 2014	
13	GK	(Belgium) Thibaut Courtois	5 years	2019	11 September 2014	
35	ST	(England) Dominic Solanke	3 years	2017	15 September 2014	
8	AM	(Brazil) Oscar	5 years	2019	5 November 2014	
10	LW	(Belgium) Eden Hazard	5 years	2020	12 February 2015	
26	CB	(England) John Terry	1 year	2016	27 March 2015	

== Transfers ==
=== In ===
==== Summer ====
No.	Pos	Player	Transferred from	Fee	Date	Source
4	CM	(Spain) Cesc Fàbregas	(Spain) Barcelona	£27,000,000	13 June 2014	
—	LW	(Switzerland) Miro Muheim	(Switzerland) FC Zürich	Undisclosed	1 July 2014	
19	ST	(Spain) Diego Costa	(Spain) Atlético Madrid	£32,000,000	15 July 2014	
3	LB	(Brazil) Filipe Luís	(Spain) Atlético Madrid	£15,800,000	16 July 2014	
11	ST	(Ivory Coast) Didier Drogba	(Turkey) Galatasaray	Free	25 July 2014	
—	AM	(Poland) Hubert Adamczyk	(Poland) Zawisza Bydgoszcz	Undisclosed	16 August 2014	
18	ST	(France) Loïc Rémy	(England) Queens Park Rangers	£10,500,000	31 August 2014	

==== Winter ====
No.	Pos	Player	Transferred from	Fee	Date	Source
23	RW	(Colombia) Juan Cuadrado	(Italy) Fiorentina	£23,300,000	2 February 2015	

=== Out ===
==== Summer ====
No.	Pos	Player	Transferred to	Fee	Date	Source
4	CB	(Brazil) David Luiz	(France) Paris Saint-Germain	£50,000,000	13 June 2014	
40	GK	(Portugal) Henrique Hilário	—	Retired	30 June 2014	
66	ST	(Uruguay) Jhon Pírez	(Spain) Getafe B	Free	30 June 2014	
27	RB	(England) Sam Hutchinson	(England) Sheffield Wednesday	Free	1 July 2014	
3	LB	(England) Ashley Cole	(Italy) Roma	Free	1 July 2014	
8	CM	(England) Frank Lampard	(England) Manchester City	Free	1 July 2014	
—	GK	(England) Jordan Beeney	(England) Charlton	Free	1 July 2014	
—	LW	(England) Ambrose Gnahore	(Sweden) Assyriska BK	Free	1 July 2014	
—	ST	(Wales) Chike Kandi	(England) Brighton	Free	1 July 2014	
19	ST	(Senegal) Demba Ba	(Turkey) Beşiktaş	£4,700,000	18 July 2014	
38	LB	(Netherlands) Patrick van Aanholt	(England) Sunderland	£1,500,000	25 July 2014	
64	LW	(Slovakia) Milan Lalkovič	(Czech Republic) Mladá Boleslav	Free	25 July 2014	
18	ST	(Belgium) Romelu Lukaku	(England) Everton	£28,000,000	30 July 2014	
—	RB	(Sweden) Isak Ssewankambo	(Netherlands) NAC Breda	Free	31 July 2014	
58	CB	(Ghana) Daniel Pappoe	(England) Brighton & Hove Albion	Free	4 August 2014	
—	CM	(England) George Cole	(England) Brighton & Hove Albion	Free	4 August 2014	
47	CM	(England) Billy Clifford	(England) Walsall	Free	7 August 2014	
56	AM	(England) George Saville	(England) Wolverhampton Wanderers	£1,000,000	26 August 2014	
29	ST	(Cameroon) Samuel Eto'o	(England) Everton	Free	26 August 2014	
—	CB	(Tanzania) Adam Nditi	(England) Fleetwood Town	Free	23 October 2014	

==== Winter ====
No.	Pos	Player	Transferred to	Fee	Date	Source
9	ST	(Spain) Fernando Torres	(Italy) Milan	Undisclosed	5 January 2015	
23	GK	(Australia) Mark Schwarzer	(England) Leicester City	Free	6 January 2015	
14	LW	(Germany) André Schürrle	(Germany) Wolfsburg	£22,000,000	2 February 2015	
34	LB	(England) Ryan Bertrand	(England) Southampton	£10,000,000	2 February 2015	
—	AM	(Belgium) Thorgan Hazard	(Germany) Borussia Mönchengladbach	£5,850,000	25 February 2015 (Note: Transfer to go through on 1 July 2015.)	

=== Loan out ===
==== Summer ====
No.	Pos	Player	Loaned to	Start	End	Source
33	CB	(Czech Republic) Tomáš Kalas	(Germany) Köln	11 June 2014	9 January 2015	
32	RB	(Brazil) Wallace	(Netherlands) Vitesse Arnhem	30 June 2014	30 June 2015	
—	LB	(Chile) Cristián Cuevas	Club Universidad de Chile	30 June 2014	30 June 2015	
—	AM	(Belgium) Thorgan Hazard	(Germany) Borussia Mönchengladbach	5 July 2014	30 June 2015	|
37	RW	(Burkina Faso) Bertrand Traoré	(Netherlands) Vitesse Arnhem	7 July 2014	30 June 2015	
—	CM	(Croatia) Mario Pašalić	(Spain) Elche	20 July 2014	30 June 2015	
30	LW	(Brazil) Lucas Piazon	(Germany) Eintracht Frankfurt	24 July 2014	30 June 2015	
34	LB	(England) Ryan Bertrand	(England) Southampton	31 July 2014	2 February 2015	
31	LW	(France) Gaël Kakuta	(Spain) Rayo Vallecano	31 July 2014	30 June 2015	
49	CM	(England) John Swift	(England) Rotherham United	1 August 2014	14 November 2014	
6	DM	(Spain) Oriol Romeu	(Germany) Stuttgart	4 August 2014	30 June 2015	
—	ST	(Colombia) Joao Rodríguez	(France) Bastia	5 August 2014	9 January 2015	
59	CB	(Nigeria) Kenneth Omeruo	(England) Middlesbrough	6 August 2014	30 June 2015	
—	RW	(Ghana) Christian Atsu	(England) Everton	13 August 2014	30 June 2015	
—	ST	(Croatia) Stipe Perica	(Netherlands) NAC Breda	15 August 2014	2 February 2015	
18	RW	(Nigeria) Victor Moses	(England) Stoke City	16 August 2014	30 June 2015	
20	CM	(England) Josh McEachran	(Netherlands) Vitesse Arnhem	17 August 2014	30 June 2015	
—	AM	(Germany) Marko Marin	(Italy) Fiorentina	18 August 2014	20 January 2015	
—	ST	(England) Patrick Bamford	(England) Middlesbrough	29 August 2014	30 June 2015	
9	ST	(Spain) Fernando Torres	(Italy) Milan	29 August 2014	5 January 2015	
16	CM	(Netherlands) Marco van Ginkel	(Italy) Milan	31 August 2014	30 June 2015	
39	DM	(England) Nathaniel Chalobah	(England) Burnley	1 September 2014	1 January 2015	
—	ST	(Scotland) Islam Feruz	(Greece) OFI	1 September 2014	1 January 2015	
40	GK	(Croatia) Matej Delač	(France) Arles-Avignon	1 September 2014	30 June 2015	
—	AM	(Mexico) Ulises Dávila	(Spain) Tenerife	1 September 2014	22 January 2015	
46	GK	(England) Jamal Blackman	(England) Middlesbrough	1 September 2014	17 January 2015	
—	RB	(England) Todd Kane	(England) Bristol City	15 November 2014	18 January 2015	
—	CB	(England) Alex Davey	(England) Scunthorpe United	26 November 2014	3 January 2015	

==== Winter ====
No.	Pos	Player	Loaned to	Start	End	Source
—	CB	(England) Alex Davey	(England) Scunthorpe United	1 January 2015	30 June 2015	
—	ST	(England) Alex Kiwomya	(England) Barnsley	3 January 2015	3 March 2015	
49	CM	(England) John Swift	(England) Swindon Town	3 January 2015	31 May 2015	
54	RB	(England) Todd Kane	(England) Nottingham Forest	8 January 2015	31 May 2015	
34	AM	(England) Lewis Baker	(England) Sheffield Wednesday	8 January 2015	11 February 2015	
—	CB	(Czech Republic) Tomáš Kalas	(England) Middlesbrough	9 January 2015	30 June 2015	
—	ST	(Scotland) Islam Feruz	(England) Blackpool	16 January 2015	3 May 2015	
—	AM	(Germany) Marko Marin	(Belgium) Anderlecht	22 January 2015	30 June 2015	
—	AM	(Mexico) Ulises Dávila	(Portugal) Vitória Setúbal	22 January 2015	30 June 2015	
39	DM	(England) Nathaniel Chalobah	(England) Reading	22 January 2015	30 June 2015	
—	ST	(Colombia) Joao Rodríguez	(Portugal) Vitória Setúbal	2 February 2015	30 June 2015	
17	AM	(Egypt) Mohamed Salah	(Italy) Fiorentina	2 February 2015	30 June 2015	
—	ST	(Croatia) Stipe Perica	(Italy) Udinese	2 February 2015	2 August 2016	
34	AM	(England) Lewis Baker	(England) Milton Keynes Dons	25 February 2015	30 June 2015	
6	CB	(Netherlands) Nathan Aké	(England) Reading	25 March 2015	22 April 2015	

=== Overall transfer activity ===
==== Spending ====
Summer: ▼£85,300,000

Winter: ▼£23,300,000

Total: ▼£108,600,000

==== Income ====
Summer: ▲£75,200,000

Winter: ▲£37,585,000

Total: ▲£112,785,000

==== Expenditure ====
Summer: ▼£10,100,000

Winter: ▲£14,285,000

Total: ▲£4,185,000

== Pre-season ==
=== Friendlies ===
16 July 2014 Friendly	Wycombe Wanderers	0–5	Chelsea	High Wycombe, England
19:45 BST		Report	Bamford 20'; Brown 48', 87'; Terry 52'; Ivanović 67'	Stadium: Adams Park; Attendance: 7,774; Referee: M. Russell (England)

19 July 2014 Friendly	AFC Wimbledon	2–3	Chelsea	Kingston upon Thames, England
15:00 BST	Bennett 1'; Tubbs 40' (pen.)	Report	Terry 74', 90'; Salah 83'	Stadium: Kingsmeadow; Attendance: 4,634; Referee: L. Collins (England)

23 July 2014 Friendly	Wolfsberger AC	1–1	Chelsea	Klagenfurt, Austria
19:30 CEST	Silvio 55'	Report	Boga 83'	Stadium: Wörthersee Stadion; Attendance: 28,700; Referee: H. Trattnig (Austria)

27 July 2014 Friendly	Olimpija	1–2	Chelsea	Ljubljana, Slovenia
17:15 CEST	Kapun 40'	Report	Costa 56'; Zouma 64'	Stadium: Stožice; Attendance: 15,972; Referee: R. Obrenović (Slovenia)

30 July 2014 Friendly	Vitesse	1–3	Chelsea	Arnhem, Netherlands
19:30 CEST	Đurđević 89'	Report	Salah 4'; Fàbregas 24'; Matić 76'	Stadium: GelreDome; Attendance: 19,273; Referee: K. Blom (Netherlands)

3 August 2014 Friendly	Werder Bremen	3–0	Chelsea	Bremen, Germany
17:00 CEST	Elia 20' (pen.); Obraniak 37'; Kroos 89' (pen.)	Report		Stadium: Weserstadion; Attendance: 30,118; Referee: H. Osmers (Germany)

8 August 2014 Friendly (45 min)	Fenerbahçe	0–2	Chelsea	Istanbul, Turkey
21:30 EEST		Report	Costa 24'; Ivanović 31'	Stadium: Şükrü Saracoğlu Stadium

8 August 2014 Friendly (45 min)	Beşiktaş	1–0	Chelsea	Istanbul, Turkey
22:30 EEST	Gülüm 43'	Report		Stadium: Şükrü Saracoğlu Stadium

10 August 2014 Friendly	Ferencváros	1–2	Chelsea	Budapest, Hungary
20:45 CEST	Gera 17'	Report	Ramires 51'; Fàbregas 81'	Stadium: Groupama Arena; Referee: I. Vad II (Hungary)

12 August 2014 Friendly	Chelsea	2–0	Real Sociedad	London, England
19:45 BST	Costa 1', 7'	Report		Stadium: Stamford Bridge; Attendance: 41,201; Referee: Craig Pawson

== Post-season ==
=== Friendlies ===
30 May 2015 Friendly	Thailand All-Stars	0–1	Chelsea	Bangkok, Thailand
12:00 BST		Report	Solanke 13'	Stadium: Rajamangala Stadium

2 June 2015 Friendly	Sydney FC	0–1	Chelsea	Sydney, Australia
11:00 BST		Report	Rémy 30'	Stadium: ANZ Stadium; Attendance: 83,598

== Competitions ==
=== Overall ===
Competition	Started round	Final position / round	First match	Last match
Premier League	—	Winners	18 August 2014	24 May 2015
FA Cup	Third round	Fourth round	4 January 2015	24 January 2015
League Cup	Third round	Winners	24 September 2014	1 March 2015
UEFA Champions League	Group stage	Round of 16	17 September 2014	11 March 2015

Source: Competitions

=== Premier League ===
==== League table ====
Pos	Team	Pld	W	D	L	GF	GA	GD	Pts	Qualification or relegation
1	Chelsea (C)	38	26	9	3	73	32	+41	87	Qualification for the Champions League group stage
2	Manchester City	38	24	7	7	83	38	+45	79	Qualification for the Champions League group stage
3	Arsenal	38	22	9	7	71	36	+35	75	Qualification for the Champions League group stage
4	Manchester United	38	20	10	8	62	37	+25	70	Qualification for the Champions League play-off round
5	Tottenham Hotspur	38	19	7	12	58	53	+5	64	Qualification for the Europa League group stage (Note: Since winners of the 2014–15 FA Cup, Arsenal, and winners of the 2014–15 Football League Cup, Chelsea, qualified for the Champions League based on league position, the spot awarded to the FA Cup winners (Europa League group stage) was passed to the sixth-placed team, Liverpool, and the spot awarded to the League Cup winners (Europa League third qualifying round) was passed to the seventh-placed team, Southampton, since those teams were the first teams in the table not already qualified for any European competition.)

Source: Barclays Premier League
Rules for classification: 1) Points; 2) Goal difference; 3) Goals scored; 4) Play-offs (only if needed to decide champion, teams for relegation or teams for UEFA competitions).
(C) Champions

==== Results summary ====
Overall								Home						Away					
Pld	W	D	L	GF	GA	GD	Pts	W	D	L	GF	GA	GD	W	D	L	GF	GA	GD
38	26	9	3	73	32	+41	87	15	4	0	36	9	+27	11	5	3	37	23	+14

Source: Premier League

==== Results by matchday ====
Matchday	1	2	3	4	5	6	7	8	9	10	11	12	13	14	15	16	17	18	19	20	21	22	23	24	25	26	27	28	29	30	31	32	33	34	35	36	37	38
Ground	A	H	A	H	A	H	H	A	A	H	A	H	A	H	A	H	A	H	A	A	H	A	H	A	H	H	A	H	A	H	A	H	A	A	H	H	A	H
Result	W	W	W	W	D	W	W	W	D	W	W	W	D	W	L	W	W	W	D	L	W	W	D	W	W	D	W	D	W	W	W	W	D	W	W	D	L	W
Position	1	1	1	1	1	1	1	1	1	1	1	1	1	1	1	1	1	1	1	1	1	1	1	1	1	1	1	1	1	1	1	1	1	1	1	1	1	1
Points	3	6	9	12	13	16	19	22	23	26	29	32	33	36	36	39	42	45	46	46	49	52	53	56	59	60	63	64	67	70	73	76	77	80	83	84	84	87

Source: Statto.com
A = Away; H = Home; W = Win; D = Draw; L = Loss

==== Matches ====
The fixtures for the 2014–15 season were announced on 18 June 2014 at 9:00 BST.

18 August 2014 1	Burnley	1–3	Chelsea	Burnley
20:00 BST	Arfield 14'; Sordell (yellow card) 87'	Report	Costa 17', (yellow card) 31'; Schürrle 21'; Ivanović 34'	Stadium: Turf Moor; Attendance: 20,699; Referee: Michael Oliver

23 August 2014 2	Chelsea	2–0	Leicester City	London
15:00 BST	Costa 62'; Hazard 77'	Report	Hammond (yellow card) 51'	Stadium: Stamford Bridge; Attendance: 41,604; Referee: Lee Mason

30 August 2014 3	Everton	3–6	Chelsea	Liverpool
17:30 BST	Mirallas 45'; Naismith 69'; Howard (yellow card) 69'; Eto'o 76'	Report	Costa 1', 90', (yellow card) 56'; Ivanović 3'; Ramires (yellow card) 64', (goal) 77'; Coleman 67' (o.g.); Matić 74'; Fàbregas (yellow card) 81'	Stadium: Goodison Park; Attendance: 39,402; Referee: Jonathan Moss

13 September 2014 4	Chelsea	4–2	Swansea City	London
15:00 BST	Costa 45', 56', 67'; Rémy 81'	Report	Terry 11' (o.g.); Amat (yellow card) 26'; Shelvey (yellow card) 32', (goal) 86'; Taylor (yellow card) 51'	Stadium: Stamford Bridge; Attendance: 41,400; Referee: Kevin Friend

21 September 2014 5	Manchester City	1–1	Chelsea	Manchester
16:00 BST	Fernandinho (yellow card) 12'; Zabaleta (yellow card) 32' (yellow-red card) 66'; Silva (yellow card) 40'; Touré (yellow card) 44'; Lampard 85'	Report	Ramires (yellow card) 35'; Matić (yellow card) 39'; Costa (yellow card) 66'; Schürrle 71'; Ivanović (yellow card) 77'	Stadium: City of Manchester Stadium; Attendance: 45,602; Referee: Mike Dean

27 September 2014 6	Chelsea	3–0	Aston Villa	London
15:00 BST	Oscar 7'; Cahill (yellow card) 26'; Fàbregas (yellow card) 58'; Costa 59'; Willian 79'	Report	Cleverley (yellow card) 51'; Senderos (yellow card) 62'	Stadium: Stamford Bridge; Attendance: 41,616 (1,550 away); Referee: Phil Dowd

5 October 2014 7	Chelsea	2–0	Arsenal	London
14:05 BST	Cahill (yellow card) 20'; Hazard 27' (pen.); Ivanović (yellow card) 53'; Schürrle (yellow card) 66'; Costa 78'; Oscar (yellow card) 86'	Report	Chambers (yellow card) 22'; Koscielny (yellow card) 27'; Welbeck (yellow card) 90+1'	Stadium: Stamford Bridge; Attendance: 41,607 (2,902 away); Referee: Martin Atkinson

18 October 2014 8	Crystal Palace	1–2	Chelsea	London
15:00 BST	Delaney (yellow card) 30' (yellow-red card) 43'; Campbell (yellow card) 41', (goal) 90'	Report	Oscar 6'; Azpilicueta (red card) 40'; Fàbregas (yellow card) 41', (goal) 51'	Stadium: Selhurst Park; Attendance: 24,451; Referee: Craig Pawson

26 October 2014 9	Manchester United	1–1	Chelsea	Manchester
16:00 BST	Rafael (yellow card) 12'; Fellaini (yellow card) 77'; Van Persie 90+4', (yellow card) 90+5'	Report	Drogba (yellow card) 22', (goal) 53'; Matić (yellow card) 39'; Fàbregas (yellow card) 50'; Oscar (yellow card) 62'; Ivanović (yellow card) 65' (yellow-red card) 90+3'; Hazard (yellow card) 88'	Stadium: Old Trafford; Attendance: 75,327; Referee: Phil Dowd

1 November 2014 10	Chelsea	2–1	Queens Park Rangers	London
15:00 GMT	Oscar 32'; Hazard 75' (pen.)	Report	Austin 62'	Stadium: Stamford Bridge; Attendance: 41,486; Referee: Mike Jones

8 November 2014 11	Liverpool	1–2	Chelsea	Liverpool
12:45 GMT	Can 9'; Sterling (yellow card) 43'; Balotelli (yellow card) 65'	Report	Cahill 14'; Ivanović (yellow card) 48'; Costa 67', (yellow card) 87'; Matić (yellow card) 69'; Oscar (yellow card) 83'; Courtois (yellow card) 90+4'	Stadium: Anfield; Attendance: 44,698; Referee: Anthony Taylor

22 November 2014 12	Chelsea	2–0	West Bromwich Albion	London
15:00 GMT	Costa 11'; Hazard 22'; Willian (yellow card) 75'	Report	Yacob (red card) 28'	Stadium: Stamford Bridge; Attendance: 41,600; Referee: Lee Mason

29 November 2014 13	Sunderland	0–0	Chelsea	Sunderland
17:30 GMT	O'Shea (yellow card) 75'; Vergini (yellow card) 89'; Gómez (yellow card) 90+2'	Report	Costa (yellow card) 55'; Matić (yellow card) 86'	Stadium: Stadium of Light; Attendance: 45,232 (2,978 away); Referee: Kevin Friend

3 December 2014 14	Chelsea	3–0	Tottenham Hotspur	London
19:45 GMT	Hazard 19'; Drogba 22'; Matić (yellow card) 50'; Rémy 73'	Report	Chiricheș (yellow card) 49'	Stadium: Stamford Bridge; Attendance: 41,518; Referee: Mike Dean

6 December 2014 15	Newcastle United	2–1	Chelsea	Newcastle upon Tyne
12:45 GMT	Sissoko (yellow card) 48'; Taylor (yellow card) 56' (yellow-red card) 81'; Cissé 57', 78'; Tioté (yellow card) 74'	Report	Schürrle (yellow card) 64'; Fàbregas (yellow card) 79'; Costa (yellow card) 80'; Drogba 83'	Stadium: St James' Park; Attendance: 52,019; Referee: Martin Atkinson

13 December 2014 16	Chelsea	2–0	Hull City	London
15:00 GMT	Hazard 7'; Willian (yellow card) 31'; Cahill (yellow card) 38'; Costa (yellow card) 58', (goal) 68'	Report	Huddlestone (yellow card) 15', (red card) 60'; Meyler (yellow card) 26'; Bruce (yellow card) 57'; Chester (yellow card) 66'	Stadium: Stamford Bridge; Attendance: 41,626 (1,550 away); Referee: Chris Foy

22 December 2014 17	Stoke City	0–2	Chelsea	Stoke-on-Trent
20:00 GMT	Bardsley (yellow card) 20'; Pieters (yellow card) 53'; Walters (yellow card) 90'	Report	Terry 2'; Fàbregas 78'	Stadium: Britannia Stadium; Attendance: 27,550; Referee: Neil Swarbrick

26 December 2014 18	Chelsea	2–0	West Ham United	London
12:45 GMT	Terry 31'; Costa 62'	Report	Collins (yellow card) 28'; Cresswell (yellow card) 33'; Reid (yellow card) 58'	Stadium: Stamford Bridge; Attendance: 41,589 (3,020 away); Referee: Michael Oliver

28 December 2014 19	Southampton	1–1	Chelsea	Southampton
14:05 GMT	Mané 17'; Yoshida (yellow card) 57'; Schneiderlin (yellow card) 71' (yellow-red card) 88'; Pellè (yellow card) 90+5'	Report	Matić (yellow card) 31'; Hazard 45+1'; Fàbregas (yellow card) 55'	Stadium: St Mary's Stadium; Attendance: 31,641; Referee: Anthony Taylor

1 January 2015 20	Tottenham Hotspur	5–3	Chelsea	London
17:30 GMT	Kane 30', 52', (yellow card) 88'; Rose 44'; Townsend 45+4' (pen.); Bentaleb (yellow card) 66'; Paulinho (yellow card) 72'; Chadli 78'	Report	Costa 18'; Hazard 61'; Fàbregas (yellow card) 82'; Terry 87'	Stadium: White Hart Lane; Attendance: 35,903; Referee: Phil Dowd

10 January 2015 21	Chelsea	2–0	Newcastle United	London
15:00 GMT	Oscar 43', (yellow card) 76'; Costa 59'; Matić (yellow card) 71'	Report	Williamson (yellow card) 45+1'; Colback (yellow card) 58'; Dummett (yellow card) 65'	Stadium: Stamford Bridge; Attendance: 41,612 (2,230 away); Referee: Roger East

17 January 2015 22	Swansea City	0–5	Chelsea	Swansea
15:00 GMT		Report	Oscar 1', 36'; Costa 20', 34'; Schürrle 79'	Stadium: Liberty Stadium; Attendance: 20,785; Referee: Jonathan Moss

31 January 2015 23	Chelsea	1–1	Manchester City	London
17:30 GMT	Rémy 41'	Report	Silva 45', (yellow card) 52'; Fernando (yellow card) 74'	Stadium: Stamford Bridge; Attendance: 41,620; Referee: Mark Clattenburg

7 February 2015 24	Aston Villa	1–2	Chelsea	Birmingham
15:00 GMT	Cleverley (yellow card) 5'; Westwood (yellow card) 44'; Okore 48', (yellow card) 49'	Report	Hazard 8'; Ramires (yellow card) 35'; Ivanović 66', (yellow card) 90+5'	Stadium: Villa Park; Attendance: 35,969; Referee: Neil Swarbrick

11 February 2015 25	Chelsea	1–0	Everton	London
19:45 GMT	Azpilicueta (yellow card) 15'; Fàbregas (yellow card) 88'; Ramires (yellow card) 89'; Willian 89'	Report	Bešić (yellow card) 5'; Barry (yellow card) 24' (yellow-red card) 88'; Coleman (yellow card) 58'; McCarthy (yellow card) 89'	Stadium: Stamford Bridge; Attendance: 41,592; Referee: Jonathan Moss

21 February 2015 26	Chelsea	1–1	Burnley	London
15:00 GMT	Ivanović 14', (yellow card) 71'; Matić (red card) 70'	Report	Boyd (yellow card) 41'; Kightly (yellow card) 62'; Mee 81'	Stadium: Stamford Bridge; Attendance: 41,629; Referee: Martin Atkinson

4 March 2015 27	West Ham United	0–1	Chelsea	London
19:45 GMT	Kouyaté (yellow card) 13'; Collins (yellow card) 43'; Nolan (yellow card) 67'	Report	Terry (yellow card) 15'; Hazard 22', (yellow card) 45+4'; Fàbregas (yellow card) 70'; Drogba (yellow card) 90+7'	Stadium: Boleyn Ground; Attendance: 34,927; Referee: Andre Marriner

15 March 2015 28	Chelsea	1–1	Southampton	London
13:30 GMT	Costa 11'; Matić (yellow card) 18'; Ivanović (yellow card) 63'; Cahill (yellow card) 68'	Report	Tadić 19' (pen.); Mané (yellow card) 29'; Wanyama (yellow card) 63'; Đuričić (yellow card) 82'	Stadium: Stamford Bridge; Attendance: 41,624; Referee: Mike Dean

22 March 2015 29	Hull City	2–3	Chelsea	Kingston upon Hull
16:00 GMT	Elmohamady 26'; Hernández 28'	Report	Hazard 2'; Costa 9'; Cahill (yellow card) 13'; Rémy 77'; Matić (yellow card) 89'	Stadium: KC Stadium; Attendance: 24,598; Referee: Michael Oliver

4 April 2015 30	Chelsea	2–1	Stoke City	London
17:30 BST	Hazard 39' (pen.); Rémy 62'; Drogba (yellow card) 90+4'	Report	Whelan (yellow card) 26'; Shawcross (yellow card) 31'; Adam 44', (yellow card) 66'; Ireland (yellow card) 45+3'; Wollscheid (yellow card) 69'; Crouch (yellow card) 90+3'	Stadium: Stamford Bridge; Attendance: 41,098; Referee: Jonathan Moss

12 April 2015 31	Queens Park Rangers	0–1	Chelsea	London
13:30 BST	Zamora (yellow card) 75'; Sandro (yellow card) 78'	Report	Drogba (yellow card) 60'; Fàbregas 88'	Stadium: Loftus Road; Attendance: 17,939; Referee: Andre Marriner

18 April 2015 32	Chelsea	1–0	Manchester United	London
17:30 BST	Hazard 38'; Drogba (yellow card) 54'; Ivanović (yellow card) 57'; Oscar (yellow card) 63'	Report	Herrera (yellow card) 90+5'	Stadium: Stamford Bridge; Attendance: 41,422; Referee: Mike Dean

26 April 2015 33	Arsenal	0–0	Chelsea	London
16:00 BST	Coquelin (yellow card) 34'; Ramsey (yellow card) 89'; Cazorla (yellow card) 90+3'; Monreal (yellow card) 90+5'	Report	Fàbregas (yellow card) 23'; Willian (yellow card) 68'; Ivanović (yellow card) 72'	Stadium: Emirates Stadium; Attendance: 60,066; Referee: Michael Oliver

29 April 2015 34	Leicester City	1–3	Chelsea	Leicester
19:45 BST	Konchesky (yellow card) 36'; Albrighton 45+3'	Report	Drogba 48'; Terry 79'; Ramires 83'	Stadium: King Power Stadium; Attendance: 32,021; Referee: Mark Clattenburg

3 May 2015 35	Chelsea	1–0	Crystal Palace	London
13:30 BST	Ivanović (yellow card) 27'; Terry (yellow card) 38'; Hazard (penalty missed) 45', 45'	Report	Dann (yellow card) 23'; Mariappa (yellow card) 45+2'	Stadium: Stamford Bridge; Attendance: 41,566; Referee: Kevin Friend

10 May 2015 36	Chelsea	1–1	Liverpool	London
16:00 BST	Fàbregas (yellow card) 2'; Terry 5'; Ivanović (yellow card) 43'; Mikel (yellow card) 58'; Filipe Luís (yellow card) 82'	Report	Lallana (yellow card) 20'; Škrtel (yellow card) 26'; Lambert (yellow card) 29'; Gerrard 44'	Stadium: Stamford Bridge; Attendance: 41,547; Referee: Andre Marriner

18 May 2015 37	West Bromwich Albion	3–0	Chelsea	West Bromwich
20:00 BST	Berahino 9', 47' (pen.); Fletcher (yellow card) 29'; Olsson (yellow card) 37'; Brunt 60'; Gardner (yellow card) 62'	Report	Costa (yellow card) 28'; Fàbregas (red card) 29'; Cuadrado (yellow card) 82'	Stadium: The Hawthorns; Attendance: 24,750; Referee: Mike Jones

24 May 2015 38	Chelsea	3–1	Sunderland	London
15:00 BST	Costa 37' (pen.); Cuadrado (yellow card) 42'; Rémy 70', 88'; Matić (yellow card) 82'	Report	Fletcher 26'; Rodwell (yellow card) 32'	Stadium: Stamford Bridge; Attendance: 41,620; Referee: Lee Mason

=== FA Cup ===
4 January 2015 Third round	Chelsea	3–0	Watford	London
16:00 GMT	Willian 58'; Rémy 70'; Zouma 72'	Report	Paredes (yellow card) 26'; Tőzsér (yellow card) 66'	Stadium: Stamford Bridge; Attendance: 41,010; Referee: Kevin Friend

24 January 2015 Fourth round	Chelsea	2–4	Bradford City	London
15:00 GMT	Cahill 21'; Ramires 38'	Report	McArdle (yellow card) 23'; Stead 41'; Morais 75'; Halliday 82'; Darby (yellow card) 90+1'; Yeates 90+3'	Stadium: Stamford Bridge; Attendance: 41,014; Referee: Andre Marriner

=== League Cup ===
24 September 2014 Third round	Chelsea	2–1	Bolton Wanderers	London
19:45 BST	Zouma 25'; Oscar 55'	Report	Mills 31'; Pratley (yellow card) 37'; Herd (yellow card) 45+1'; Spearing (yellow card) 86'	Stadium: Stamford Bridge; Attendance: 40,988; Referee: Graham Scott

28 October 2014 Fourth round	Shrewsbury Town	1–2	Chelsea	Shrewsbury
19:45 BST	Mangan 77'	Report	Aké (yellow card) 21'; Drogba 48'; Grandison 81' (o.g.)	Stadium: New Meadow; Attendance: 10,210; Referee: Neil Swarbrick

16 December 2014 Fifth round	Derby County	1–3	Chelsea	Derby
19:45 GMT	Bryson 71'; Buxton (red card) 78'; Martin (yellow card) 80'	Report	Schürrle (yellow card) 3', (goal) 82'; Hazard 23'; Filipe Luís 56'	Stadium: iPro Stadium; Attendance: 30,639; Referee: Jonathan Moss

20 January 2015 Semi-finals; First leg	Liverpool	1–1	Chelsea	Liverpool
19:45 GMT	Gerrard (yellow card) 39'; Lucas (yellow card) 44'; Sterling 59'	Report	Hazard 18' (pen.); Filipe Luís (yellow card) 45'; Mikel (yellow card) 74'	Stadium: Anfield; Attendance: 44,573; Referee: Martin Atkinson

27 January 2015 Semi-finals; Second leg	Chelsea	1–0 (a.e.t.) (2–1 agg.)	Liverpool	London
19:45 GMT	Terry (yellow card) 74'; Ivanović (yellow card) 89', (goal) 94'; Costa (yellow card) 102'; Oscar (yellow card) 108'	Report	Henderson (yellow card) 42'; Lucas (yellow card) 53'; Gerrard (yellow card) 102'; Can (yellow card) 114'; Škrtel (yellow card) 116'	Stadium: Stamford Bridge; Attendance: 40,659; Referee: Michael Oliver

1 March 2015 Final	Chelsea	2–0	Tottenham Hotspur	London
16:00 GMT	Terry 45'; Costa 56'; Willian (yellow card) 70'; Cahill (yellow card) 72'; Cuadrado (yellow card) 85'	Report	Dier (yellow card) 31'; Bentaleb (yellow card) 78'	Stadium: Wembley Stadium; Attendance: 89,294; Referee: Anthony Taylor; Man of the Match: John Terry

=== UEFA Champions League ===
==== Group stage ====
Pos	Team	Pld	W	D	L	GF	GA	GD	Pts	Qualification	CHE	SCH	SPO	MRB
1	(England) Chelsea	6	4	2	0	17	3	+14	14	Advance to knockout phase	—	1–1	3–1	6–0
2	(Germany) Schalke 04	6	2	2	2	9	14	−5	8	Advance to knockout phase	0–5	—	4–3	1–1
3	(Portugal) Sporting CP	6	2	1	3	12	12	0	7	Transfer to Europa League	0–1	4–2	—	3–1
4	(Slovenia) Maribor	6	0	3	3	4	13	−9	3		1–1	0–1	1–1	—

Source: UEFA
Rules for classification: Group stage tiebreakers

17 September 2014 1	Chelsea (England)	1–1	(Germany) Schalke 04	London, England
19:45 BST	Fàbregas 11'; Terry (yellow card) 59'; Willian (yellow card) 71'	Report	Huntelaar (yellow card) 11', (goal) 62'; Boateng (yellow card) 26'; Höger (yellow card) 87'	Stadium: Stamford Bridge; Attendance: 40,648; Referee: Ivan Bebek (Croatia)

30 September 2014 2	Sporting CP (Portugal)	0–1	(England) Chelsea	Lisbon, Portugal
19:45 BST	Carvalho (yellow card) 25'; João Mário (yellow card) 43'; Maurício (yellow card) 60'; Soares (yellow card) 74'	Report	Matić 34'; Ivanović (yellow card) 58'; Hazard (yellow card) 72'; Filipe Luís (yellow card) 75'; Fàbregas (yellow card) 90+3'	Stadium: Estádio José Alvalade; Attendance: 40,734; Referee: Antonio Mateu Lahoz (Spain)

21 October 2014 3	Chelsea (England)	6–0	(Slovenia) Maribor	London, England
19:45 BST	Rémy 13'; Drogba 23' (pen.); Terry 31'; Viler 54' (o.g.); Hazard 77' (pen.), 90'	Report		Stadium: Stamford Bridge; Attendance: 41,126; Referee: Danny Makkelie (Netherlands)

5 November 2014 4	Maribor (Slovenia)	1–1	(England) Chelsea	Maribor, Slovenia
19:45 GMT	Filipović (yellow card) 36'; Ibraimi 50'; Stojanović (yellow card) 53'; Viler (yellow card) 85'	Report	Filipe Luís (yellow card) 24'; Matić 73'	Stadium: Ljudski vrt Attendance: 12,646; Referee: Daniele Orsato (Italy)

25 November 2014 5	Schalke 04 (Germany)	0–5	(England) Chelsea	Gelsenkirchen, Germany
19:45 GMT	Höger (yellow card) 18'	Report	Terry 2'; Willian 29'; Kirchhoff 44' (o.g.); Drogba 76'; Ramires 78'	Stadium: Veltins-Arena; Attendance: 54,442; Referee: Jonas Eriksson (Sweden)

10 December 2014 6	Chelsea (England)	3–1	(Portugal) Sporting CP	London, England
19:45 GMT	Fàbregas 8' (pen.); Schürrle 16'; Mikel 56'; Azpilicueta (yellow card) 87'	Report	J. Silva 50', (yellow card) 82'; Carvalho (yellow card) 58'; A. Silva (yellow card) 79'; Oliveira (yellow card) 90+2'	Stadium: Stamford Bridge; Attendance: 40,734; Referee: Svein Oddvar Moen (Norway)

==== Knockout phase ====
===== Round of 16 =====
17 February 2015 First leg	Paris Saint-Germain (France)	1–1	(England) Chelsea	Paris, France
19:45 GMT	Van der Wiel (yellow card) 52'; Cavani 54'; Verratti (yellow card) 78'	Report	Ivanović 36', (yellow card) 65'; Fàbregas (yellow card) 73'	Stadium: Parc des Princes; Attendance: 46,146; Referee: Cüneyt Çakır (Turkey)

11 March 2015 Second leg	Chelsea (England)	2–2 (a.e.t.) (3–3 a agg.)	(France) Paris Saint-Germain	London, England
19:45 GMT	Oscar (yellow card) 37'; Ramires (yellow card) 52'; Costa (yellow card) 73'; Cahill 81'; Hazard 96' (pen.)	Report	Ibrahimović (red card) 31'; Motta (yellow card) 33'; Matuidi (yellow card) 40'; David Luiz (yellow card) 73', (goal) 86'; Verratti (yellow card) 74'; Thiago Silva 114'	Stadium: Stamford Bridge; Attendance: 37,692; Referee: Björn Kuipers (Netherlands)

== Statistics ==
=== Appearances ===
Source: Chelsea F.C.

No.	Pos.	Name	League		FA Cup		League Cup		Champions League		Total		Discipline	
No.	Pos.	Name	Apps	Goals	Apps	Goals	Apps	Goals	Apps	Goals	Apps	Goals	Yellow card	Red card
1	GK	(Czech Republic) Petr Čech	6 (1)	0	2	0	4	0	3	0	15 (1)	0	0	0
2	DF	(Serbia) Branislav Ivanović	38	4	0	0	3 (1)	1	7	1	49 (1)	6	11	1
3	DF	(Brazil) Filipe Luís	9 (6)	0	1	0	5	1	5	0	20 (6)	1	3	0
4	MF	(Spain) Cesc Fàbregas	33 (1)	3	0 (1)	0	4	0	8	2	45 (2)	5	9	0
5	DF	(France) Kurt Zouma	7 (8)	0	2	1	5	1	3 (1)	0	17 (9)	2	0	0
6	DF	(Netherlands) Nathan Aké	0 (1)	0	0 (1)	0	2	0	0 (1)	0	2 (3)	0	1	0
7	MF	(Brazil) Ramires	11 (12)	2	2	1	1 (2)	0	3 (3)	1	17 (17)	4	4	0
8	MF	(Brazil) Oscar	26 (2)	6	2	0	3 (1)	1	4 (3)	0	35 (6)	7	4	0
10	MF	(Belgium) Eden Hazard	38	14	0 (1)	0	4 (2)	2	7	3	49 (3)	19	3	0
11	FW	(Ivory Coast) Didier Drogba	8 (20)	4	2	0	2 (3)	1	2 (3)	2	14 (26)	7	4	0
12	MF	(Nigeria) John Obi Mikel	6 (12)	0	2	0	4	0	1 (1)	1	13 (13)	1	1	0
13	GK	(Belgium) Thibaut Courtois	32	0	0	0	2	0	5	0	39	0	1	0
18	FW	(France) Loïc Rémy	6 (13)	7	2	1	1 (1)	0	1 (3)	1	10 (17)	9	0	0
19	FW	(Spain) Diego Costa	24 (2)	20	0 (1)	0	3	1	5 (2)	0	32 (5)	21	9	0
21	MF	(Serbia) Nemanja Matić	35 (1)	1	0	0	3 (2)	0	8	2	46 (3)	3	10	1
22	MF	(Brazil) Willian	28 (8)	2	0 (2)	1	3 (1)	0	5 (2)	1	36 (13)	4	5	0
23	MF	(Colombia) Juan Cuadrado	4 (8)	0	0	0	0 (1)	0	0 (1)	0	4 (10)	0	1	0
24	DF	(England) Gary Cahill	33 (3)	1	2	1	4	0	6	1	45 (3)	3	6	0
26	DF	(England) John Terry	38	5	0	0	4	1	7	2	49	8	3	0
28	DF	(Spain) César Azpilicueta	29	0	2	0	3 (2)	0	4	0	38 (2)	0	1	1
31	DF	(Denmark) Andreas Christensen	0 (1)	0	1	0	1	0	0	0	2 (1)	0	0	0
33	GK	(England) Mitchell Beeney	0	0	0	0	0	0	0	0	0	0	0	0
35	FW	(England) Dominic Solanke	0	0	0	0	0	0	0 (1)	0	0 (1)	0	0	0
36	MF	(England) Ruben Loftus-Cheek	2 (1)	0	0	0	0	0	0 (1)	0	1 (2)	0	0	0
37	FW	(England) Isaiah Brown	0 (1)	0	0	0	0	0	0	0	0	0	0	0
46	GK	(England) Jamal Blackman	0	0	0	0	0	0	0	0	0	0	0	0
Players who left the club in January transfer window or on loan
14	MF	(Germany) André Schürrle	5 (9)	3	1	0	3	1	3 (1)	1	12 (10)	5	2	0
17	MF	(Egypt) Mohamed Salah	0 (3)	0	0 (1)	0	2	0	1 (1)	0	3 (5)	0	0	0

=== Top scorers ===
Source: BBC Sport

The list is sorted by shirt number when total goals are equal.

Rnk	Pos	No.	Player	Premier League	FA Cup	League Cup	Champions League	Total
1	FW	19	(Spain) Costa	20	0	1	0	21
2	MF	10	(Belgium) Hazard	14	0	2	3	19
3	FW	18	(France) Rémy	7	1	0	1	9
4	DF	26	(England) Terry	5	0	1	2	8
5	MF	8	(Brazil) Oscar	6	0	1	0	7
5	FW	11	(Ivory Coast) Drogba	4	0	1	2	7
7	DF	2	(Serbia) Ivanović	4	0	1	1	6
8	MF	4	(Spain) Fàbregas	3	0	0	2	5
8	MF	14	(Germany) Schürrle (Note: Left Chelsea during the 2015 January transfer window)	3	0	1	1	5
10	MF	7	(Brazil) Ramires	2	1	0	1	4
10	MF	22	(Brazil) Willian	2	1	0	1	4
10	Own goals			1	0	1	2	4
13	MF	21	(Serbia) Matić	1	0	0	2	3
13	DF	24	(England) Cahill	1	1	0	1	3
15	DF	5	(France) Zouma	0	1	1	0	2
16	DF	3	(Brazil) Filipe Luís	0	0	1	0	1
16	MF	12	(Nigeria) Mikel	0	0	0	1	1
TOTALS				73	5	11	20	109

=== Clean sheets ===
Source: Chelsea F.C.

The list is sorted by shirt number when total appearances are equal.

Rnk	Pos	No.	Player	Premier League	FA Cup	League Cup	Champions League	Total
1	GK	13	(Belgium) Courtois	12	0	1	2	15
2	GK	1	(Czech Republic) Čech	5	1	1	1	8
TOTALS				17	1	2	3	23

=== Summary ===
Source: Chelsea F.C.

Games played	54 (38 Premier League) (2 FA Cup) (8 UEFA Champions League) (6 Football League Cup)
Games won	36 (26 Premier League) (1 FA Cup) (4 UEFA Champions League) (5 Football League Cup)
Games drawn	14 (9 Premier League) (0 FA Cup) (4 UEFA Champions League) (1 Football League Cup)
Games lost	4 (3 Premier League) (1 FA Cup) (0 UEFA Champions League) (0 Football League Cup)
Goals scored	109 (73 Premier League) (5 FA Cup) (20 UEFA Champions League) (11 Football League Cup)
Goals conceded	46 (32 Premier League) (4 FA Cup) (6 UEFA Champions League) (4 Football League Cup)
Goal difference	+63 (+38 Premier League) (+1 FA Cup) (+14 UEFA Champions League) (+7 Football League Cup)
Clean sheets	23 (17 Premier League) (1 FA Cup) (3 UEFA Champions League) (2 Football League Cup)
Most appearances	(Belgium) Eden Hazard (52 appearances)
Top scorer	(Spain) Diego Costa (21 goals)

== Awards ==
=== Player ===
No.	Player	Award	Month	Source
19	(Spain) Diego Costa	August Player of the Month	August	
14	(Germany) André Schürrle	August Goal of the Month	August	
13	(Belgium) Thibaut Courtois	Belgian Sportsman of the year	December	
35	(England) Dominic Solanke	England Men's Youth Player of the Year	January	
11	(Ivory Coast) Didier Drogba	FWA Tribute Award	January	
2	(Serbia) Branislav Ivanović	PFA Team of the Year	April	
26	(England) John Terry	PFA Team of the Year	April	
24	(England) Gary Cahill	PFA Team of the Year	April	
21	(Serbia) Nemanja Matić	PFA Team of the Year	April	
10	(Belgium) Eden Hazard	PFA Team of the Year	April	
19	(Spain) Diego Costa	PFA Team of the Year	April	
10	(Belgium) Eden Hazard	PFA Player of the Year	April	
11	(Ivory Coast) Didier Drogba	Barclays Spirit of the Game Award	April	
10	(Belgium) Eden Hazard	FWA Footballer of the Year	May	
10	(Belgium) Eden Hazard	Premier League Player of the Season	May	
5	(France) Kurt Zouma	Chelsea Young Player of the Year	May	
8	(Brazil) Oscar	Chelsea Goal of the Year	May	
35	(England) Dominic Solanke	Academy Player of the Year	May	
10	(Belgium) Eden Hazard	Chelsea Players' Player of the Year	May	
10	(Belgium) Eden Hazard	Chelsea Player of the Year	May	

=== Manager ===
Manager	Award	Month	Source
(Portugal) José Mourinho	Premier League Manager of the Season	May	
(Portugal) José Mourinho	LMA Manager of the Year	May	
