= César Azpilicueta =

Spanish footballer (born 1989)

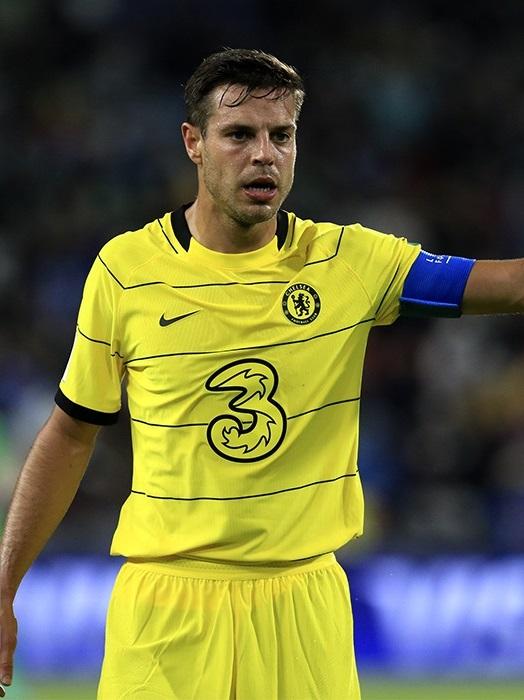
- Azpilicueta playing for Chelsea in 2022

Personal information
- Full name: César Azpilicueta Tanco
- Date of birth: 28 August 1989 (age 37)
- Place of birth: Zizur Mayor, Spain
- Height: 1.78 m (5 ft 10 in)
- Position: Defender

Youth career
- 2001–2006: Osasuna

Senior career*
Years	Team	Apps	(Gls)
2006–2007	Osasuna B	27	(1)
2007–2010	Osasuna	99	(0)
2010–2012	Marseille	47	(1)
2012–2023	Chelsea	349	(10)
2023–2025	Atlético Madrid	39	(1)
2025–2026	Sevilla	17	(0)
Total		578	(13)

International career
2005	Spain U16	3	(0)
2006	Spain U17	14	(0)
2007–2008	Spain U19	18	(2)
2009	Spain U20	5	(0)
2008–2011	Spain U21	19	(1)
2012	Spain U23	6	(0)
2013–2023	Spain	44	(1)
Medal record
Men's football
Representing Spain
UEFA European Under-19 Championship
Winner	2007 Austria
UEFA European Under-21 Championship
Winner	2011 Denmark
UEFA Nations League
Runner-up	2021 Italy
FIFA Confederations Cup
Runner-up	2013 Brazil
UEFA European Championship
Bronze medal – third place	2020 Europe
- * Club domestic league appearances and goals

César Azpilicueta Tanco (Spanish pronunciation: [aθpiliˈkweta], born 28 August 1989) is a Spanish former professional footballer who played as a right-back or centre-back.

A youth product of Osasuna, Azpilicueta spent three seasons in La Liga before switching to Marseille. In the summer of 2012, he moved to Chelsea, winning the Europa League in his first season and a domestic double two years later. He made over 500 appearances for the club and was sixth on their list of all-time appearances when he departed in 2023, having played more times for them than any other non-English player. Described as a Stamford Bridge 'legend', he captained Chelsea to 2018–19 UEFA Europa League, 2020–21 UEFA Champions League and 2021 FIFA Club World Cup victories.

Azpilicueta earned 55 caps for Spain at youth level in all age groups, and represented the under-21s in two European Championships, winning the 2011 edition. He made his first appearance with the senior team in 2013 and was selected for 2014, 2018 and 2022 editions of the FIFA World Cup, as well as UEFA Euro 2016 and UEFA Euro 2020.

== Club career ==
=== Osasuna ===
A product of hometown club Osasuna's youth system, he made his La Liga debut on 8 April 2007 in a 0–2 away loss against Real Madrid, while still registered with the reserve team; he started his career as a forward then switched to midfielder and, throughout both his club and international career (senior and youth), appeared in several positions, including centre-back and central midfielder.

In 2007–08, due to injuries in the main squad, Azpilicueta established himself as a first-team regular at the age of just 18, albeit as a right-back. He went on to retain this position for the following season, appearing in all but two league games.

=== Marseille ===
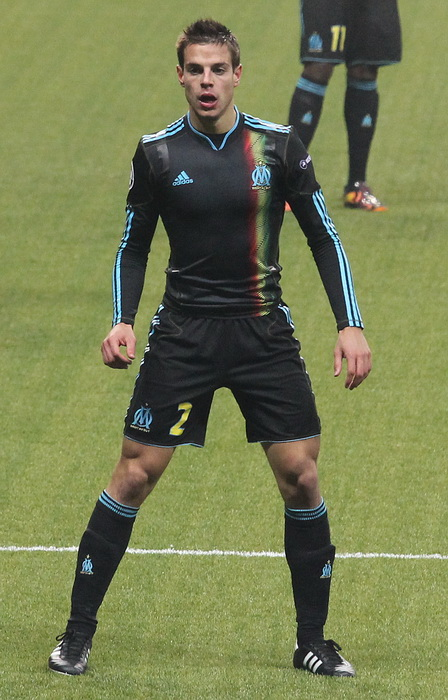
Azpilicueta playing for Marseille in 2010

On 21 June 2010, French club Marseille confirmed an agreement had been reached with Osasuna for the transfer of Azpilicueta, in a four-year contract for €7 million. A week later, the Navarrese confirmed the agreement, with the transfer fee possibly rising to as much as €9.5 million depending on appearances. On his UEFA Champions League debut, he scored the match's only goal in a group stage home match against Spartak Moscow, though it was into his own net.

On 27 November 2010, in the early minutes of a 4–0 home win against Montpellier – which meant Marseille climbed to the top of the league – Azpilicueta ruptured the anterior cruciate ligament in his left knee. He was sidelined for six months. On 13 May 2012, he scored his first and only Ligue 1 goal for Marseille in a 3–0 win over Auxerre.

In August 2012, amid speculation of clubs showing interest in Azpilicueta, including Premier League club Chelsea, Marseille confirmed that he could leave, saying: "If Chelsea makes a fair offer for Azpi [Azpilicueta], we will let him leave." Despite his loyalty to Marseille, the footballer said he was willing to leave if his "departure can help Marseille's finances".

=== Chelsea ===
==== 2012–2013: Inaugural season and first Europa League title ====
On 24 August 2012, Chelsea completed the signing of Azpilicueta for an undisclosed fee, reported as £7 million. According to teammate and countryman Juan Mata, "He is a strong running right-back who has pace as well, so I think he is already a complete player." Due to his surname being difficult for some speakers of English to pronounce, club fans gave him the mononymous nickname "Dave".

Azpilicueta made his debut on 25 September 2012, starting in a 6–0 home win against Wolverhampton Wanderers in a League Cup tie. He played his first Premier League game the following week, coming on as a substitute for Branislav Ivanović in a 4–1 success over Norwich City, also at Stamford Bridge.

On 3 November 2012, Azpilicueta made his first league start, appearing against Swansea City in a 1–1 away draw. He played 48 official contests in his first year with the Rafael Benítez-led side, including eight in the Blues' victorious campaign in the UEFA Europa League. In the final against Benfica, his 67th-minute handball led to Óscar Cardozo equalising through a penalty kick, in an eventual 2–1 win in Amsterdam.

==== 2013–2017: Two Premier League titles ====
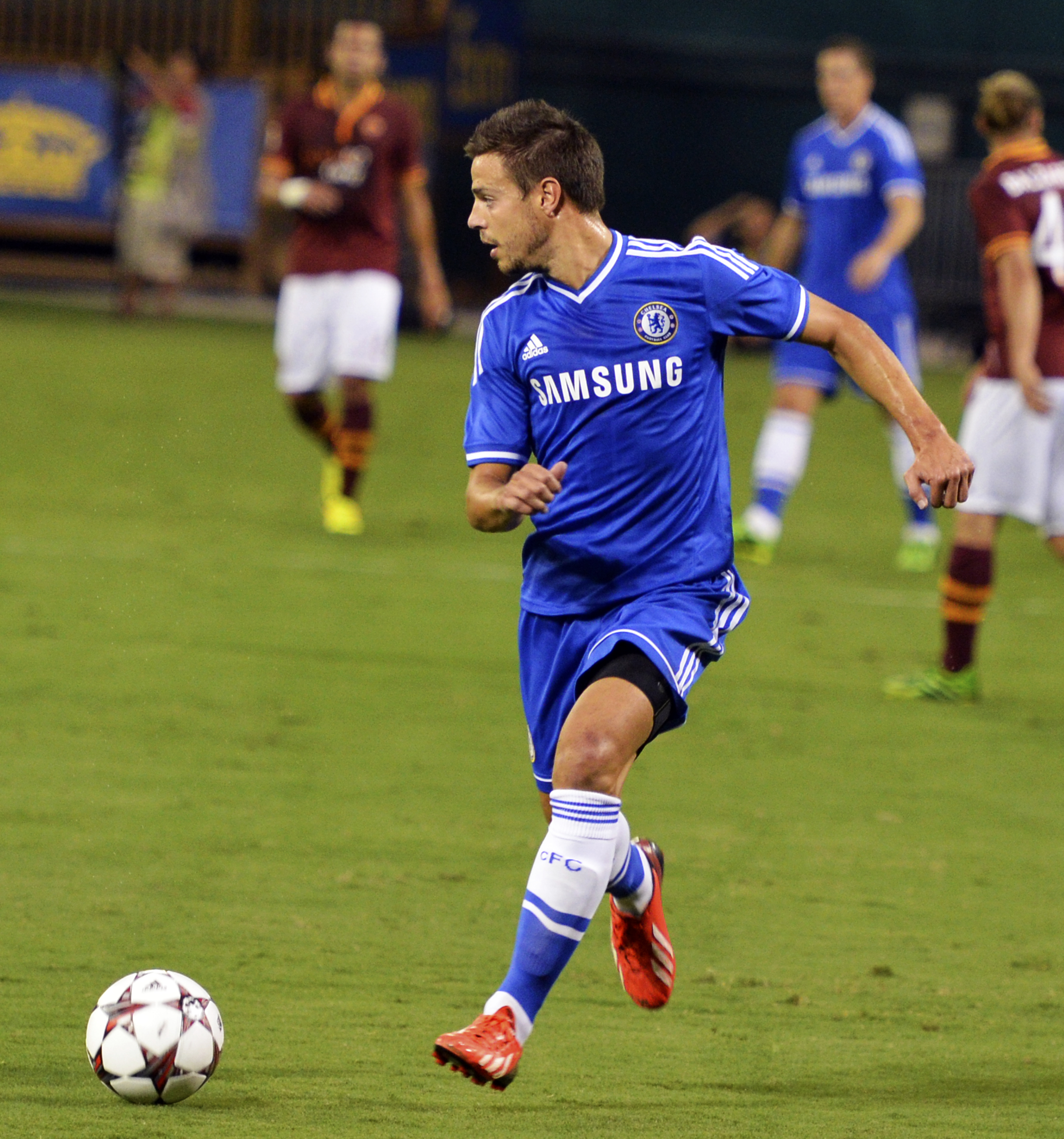
Azpilicueta playing for Chelsea in 2013

Azpilicueta scored his first competitive goal for Chelsea on 29 October 2013, netting the first in a 2–0 victory at Arsenal in the fourth round of the League Cup. Following the arrival of new manager José Mourinho, he began appearing regularly as a left-back, taking the place of longtime incumbent Ashley Cole. Mourinho said of him: "Azpilicueta is the kind of player I like a lot. I think a team with 11 Azpilicuetas would probably win the competition (Champions League) because football is not just about pure talent". At the end of the season, he was voted the club's Players' Player of the Year.

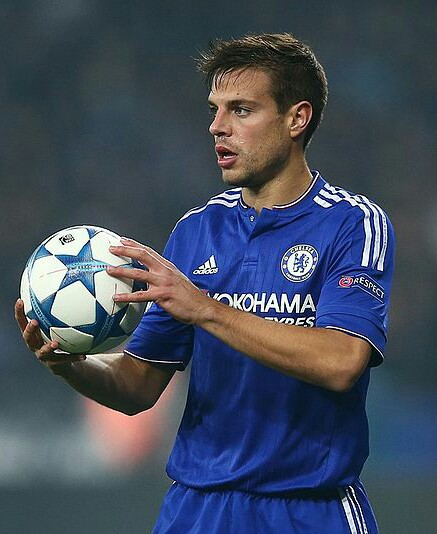
Azpilicueta playing for Chelsea in 2015

Before the start of the 2014–15 season, Cole was released and the club spent £15.8 million on Filipe Luís, but Azpilicueta began the season as first-choice left-back. On 2 September 2014, he signed a new five-year contract with the club and on 18 October, he was sent off in the first half of a 2–1 win at Crystal Palace for a foul on Mile Jedinak.

Azpilicueta started as Chelsea won the League Cup on 1 March 2015. In the second half, he was injured in a collision with Tottenham Hotspur's Eric Dier, and had to leave the pitch for a bandage to be wrapped around his head. The campaign ended with the additional conquest of the domestic league title, after a five-year wait.

On 2 August 2015, Azpilicueta featured for 69 minutes in the 1–0 FA Community Shield loss to Arsenal. Nineteen days later, he scored the team's third goal in a 3–2 away win over West Bromwich Albion, for what was his first Premier League goal, and he netted again in a 2–2 draw in the reverse fixture on 13 January 2016.

Although Azpilicueta was initially used as a left-back under new coach Antonio Conte, after two consecutive league defeats, the latter changed to a back-three formation, with the former playing as a centre-back in the following match against Hull City on 1 October 2016, which ended in a 2–0 away win. On 13 December 2016, he signed a new three-and-a-half-year contract with Chelsea, running until 2020; in his first appearance following the agreement he made his 200th competitive appearance for the club, in a 1–0 away victory over Sunderland.

Azpilicueta played every minute of the season as his team won the domestic league, and scored in a 4–3 home win against Watford after the title was already won.

==== 2017–2020: FA Cup victory, second Europa League title and assuming captaincy ====
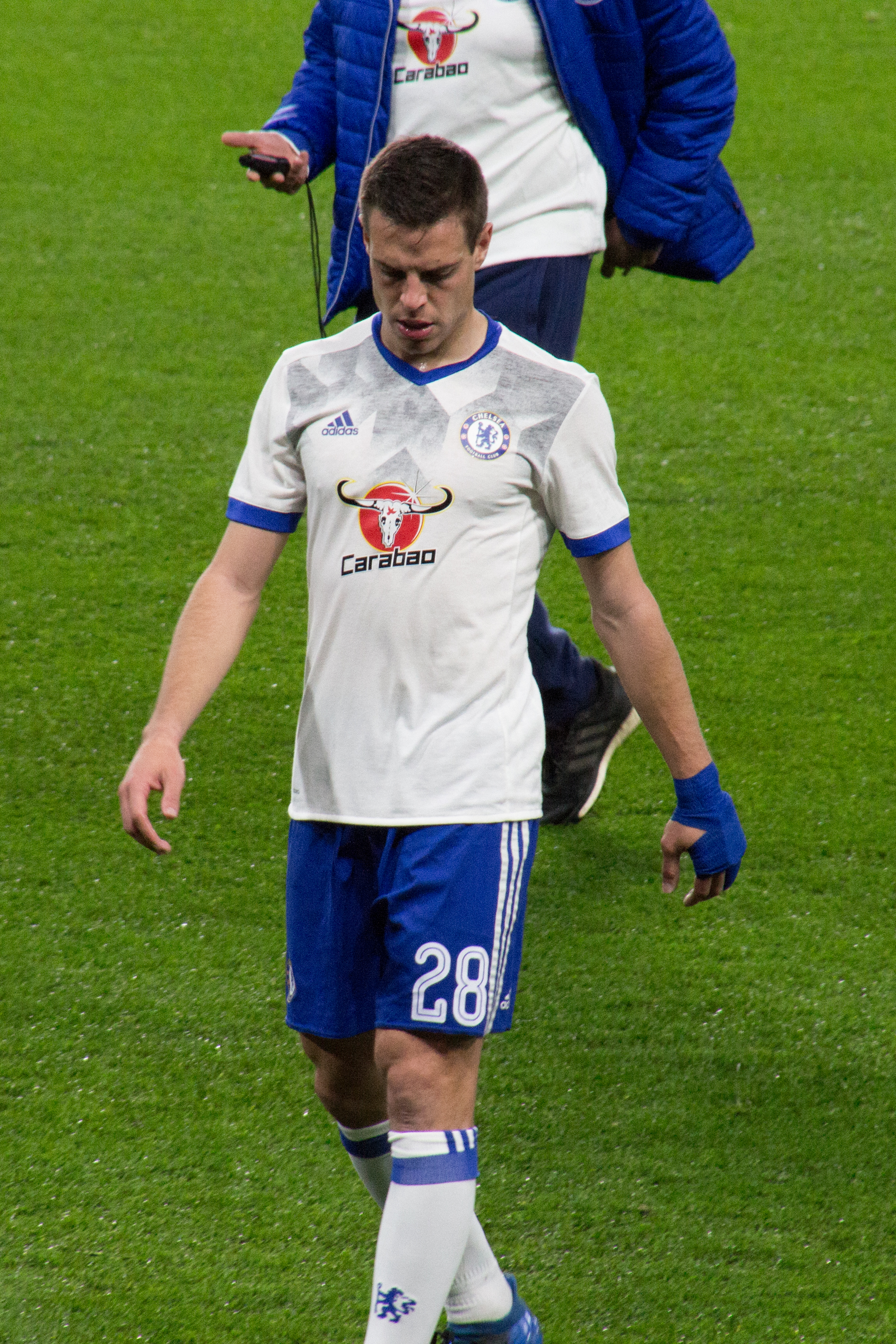
Azpilicueta playing for Chelsea in 2017

In late July 2017, after the departure of John Terry, he was appointed vice-captain to Gary Cahill. On 12 September that year, he scored his first Champions League goal, in a 6–0 group stage home win against Qarabağ FK. On 19 May 2018, he won the FA Cup title after a 1–0 victory for Chelsea over Manchester United in the final.

Azpilicueta signed a new deal in December 2018, lasting to 2022. On 29 May 2019, he won his second Europa League with Chelsea after a 4–1 victory over Arsenal in the final at the Baku Olympic Stadium.

After Cahill left Chelsea, he was named club captain ahead of the 2019–20 season; he had already worn the armband on the pitch while the Englishman was out of the team, including in the Europa League final victory against Arsenal in Azerbaijan. On 23 October 2019, he marked his 350th Chelsea appearance with a 1–0 group stage away win against Ajax in the Champions League.

On 1 January 2020, Azpilicueta marked his 100th appearance as club captain with a goal and being named man of the match in the 1–1 draw against Brighton & Hove Albion. On 1 August, during the 2–1 defeat to Arsenal in the 2020 FA Cup Final, Azpilicueta conceded a penalty and was later injured, leading to his substitution.

==== 2020–21 season: Champions League triumph ====
Azpilicueta became the 13th player in Chelsea's history to make 400 appearances, when he featured against Manchester City on 3 January 2021. On 23 May, the final matchday of the league season, he was sent off for appearing to strike Aston Villa's Jack Grealish during a 1–2 defeat, but the three-game suspension was overturned on appeal. Six days later, he captained the team to a 1–0 victory in the UEFA Champions League Final against Manchester City at the Estádio do Dragão, Porto, winning their first Champions League title in 9 years.

On 28 August 2021, Azpilicueta reached a milestone as he became the fourth Chelsea player to reach 300 Premier League appearances after John Terry (492), Frank Lampard (429) and Petr Čech (333). He started against Liverpool in a 1–1 draw.

==== 2021–22 season: UEFA Super Cup and FIFA Club World Cup titles ====
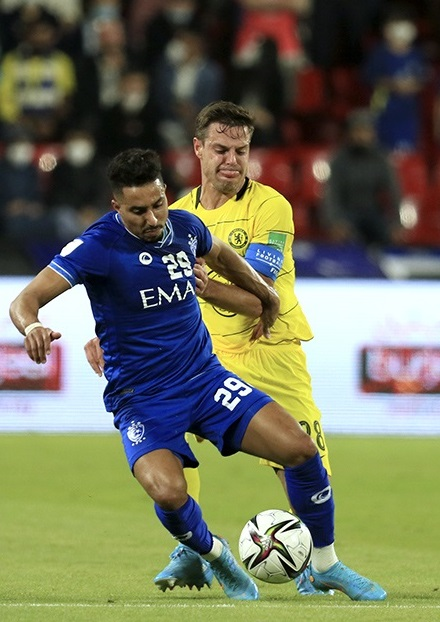
Azpilicueta (right) and Al Hilal's Salem Al-Dawsari clashing during the 2021 FIFA Club World Cup

On 8 October 2021, Azpilicueta was one of five Chelsea players included in the final 30-man shortlist for the 2021 Ballon d'Or.

On 12 February 2022, Azpilicueta lifted the trophy in the 2021 FIFA Club World Cup Final in their second FIFA Club World Cup Final, the first one being in 2012 when Chelsea lost to Corinthians. With this trophy and the UEFA Super Cup secured shortly before, it meant he became the first and only Chelsea player to have won every major trophy at the club.

==== 2022–23 season: Appearance records and departure ====
On 4 August 2022, he signed a new contract with Chelsea until 2024.

On 1 January 2023, Azpilicueta played his 495th game for Chelsea, surpassing Petr Čech as the non-Englishman with the most appearances for the club. On 21 January, he played his 500th match for the club, becoming only the sixth player (and first foreigner) in its history to reach that milestone.

On 18 February, during a game between Chelsea and Southampton, Azpilicueta was knocked unconscious after being accidentally kicked in the head by Southampton's Sékou Mara. Mara was attempting an overhead kick late in the game when he missed the ball and connected with Azpilicueta instead. Azpilicueta was rushed to hospital after the incident after being stretchered off the pitch.

On 6 July 2023, Azpilicueta announced his parting with Chelsea, marking the end of a decade-long association with the club. His departure was confirmed via a video message he shared on social media, wherein he signed off as "Your captain Cesar Azpilicueta, aka 'Dave' ".

=== Atlético Madrid ===
Following the departure from Chelsea, Azpilicueta returned to La Liga after 13 years and joined Atlético Madrid by signing a one-year contract. He made his debut for the club on 14 August, in a 3–1 league win over Granada.

Having played a total number of 34 games in his first season, he renewed his contract with the club for another year in June 2024. A year later, it was announced that Azpilicueta would not be extending his contract with Atletico Madrid beyond the 2024–25 La Liga season.

=== Sevilla ===
On 29 August 2025, Azpilicueta signed a one-year deal with La Liga club Sevilla. The contract also included an option to extend until 2027. On 22 May 2026, he announced his retirement from professional football by the end of the season. Next day, on 23 May 2026, at the 2025–26 La Liga final round against Celta Vigo, he played his last professional match.

== International career ==
=== Youth ===
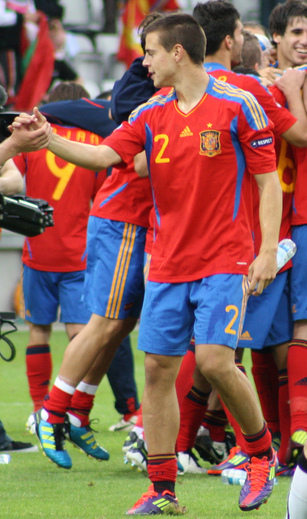
Azpilicueta playing for Spain under-21s in 2011

In 2007, Azpilicueta helped the Spain under-19 team win the UEFA European Championship. Shortly after he moved to the under-21s, being picked for the 2009 European Championships in Sweden where he started three matches in an eventual group stage exit.

On 11 May 2010, 20-year-old Azpilicueta was named by senior side manager Vicente del Bosque in a provisional list of 30 players, in view of the forthcoming edition of the FIFA World Cup. Eventually, he did not make the final cut. A year later, after recovering from a long-term injury, he went to the European Under-21 Championship in Denmark, and won the tournament.

Azpilicueta was picked for Spain's squad for the 2012 Summer Olympics, after missing out on selection for the UEFA Euro 2012 tournament. Due to the presence of Álvaro Domínguez, he only appeared in the last group match, a 0–0 draw with Morocco at Old Trafford, as the national team exited in the group stage.

=== Senior ===
On 1 February 2013, Azpilicueta was named in the squad for the upcoming international friendly against Uruguay. The manager said of the selection: 'Azpilicueta is playing many games for Chelsea. He has a lot of energy, defends well and is always willing to attack. We have a lot of hope for him. He made his debut five days later, playing the full 90 minutes in the 3–1 win in Doha, Qatar; after the match, he said that it was his "dream to play for Spain" at the senior level. Azpilicueta was selected to the 2013 FIFA Confederations Cup tournament held in Brazil: he started in the second group game against Tahiti which Spain won 10–0 in a record for the largest margin of victory in the competition, and replaced Álvaro Arbeloa at half-time in the final against the hosts, in an eventual 3–0 loss.

In June 2014, Azpilicueta was selected to represent Spain in the 2014 FIFA World Cup in Brazil. He was the starting right-back during the first two fixtures, against the Netherlands and Chile, as the nation was eliminated at the group stage.

Azpilicueta was also included in the 23-man squad for the 2018 World Cup in Russia, as well as the 24-man squad for UEFA Euro 2020. At the latter, he scored his first senior international goal, his team's second of a 5–3 win against Croatia in the round of 16.

Azpilicueta captained Spain for the first time in a 2022 FIFA World Cup qualification match against Georgia on 5 September 2021. He was included in Spain's 26-man squad for the 2022 World Cup in Qatar, appearing twice at the tournament.

== Personal life ==
Azpilicueta was born in Zizur Mayor, Navarre, to Patxi Azpilicueta, a decorator and Charo Tanco, a primary school teacher. Azpilicueta's older brother, Juan Pablo (born 1980), was also a footballer. A midfielder, he competed exclusively in lower-league football. Since retiring, Juan Pablo has transitioned into management. Most recently, he served as manager of CD Subiza in Spain's Tercera División.

In June 2015, Azpilicueta married his long-term girlfriend Adriana Guerendiain. Together, the couple have three children; two daughters and a son. Adriana gave birth to the couple's first daughter, Martina, in March 2014.

Since 2018, Azpilicueta has been a board member and co-owner of English non-league side Hashtag United, which plays in the Isthmian League North Division. In 2020, Azpilicueta announced the formation of his own esports team, Falcons. He is part-owner along with Jose Antonio Cacho and Jesus Rincon, both of whom are top players in Spain with millions of YouTube subscribers.

Azpilicueta is trilingual. He is fluent in Spanish, French, and English. As of 2021, he was working to complete an online degree, an MBA in Business Management from the Berlin School of Business and Innovation. In June 2023, Azpilicueta announced on his Instagram page that he had successfully completed a 4-day course and received a certificate in the business of entertainment, media and sports from Harvard Business School.

== Career statistics ==
=== Club ===
Appearances and goals by club, season and competition
Club	Season	League			National cup (Note: Includes Copa del Rey, Coupe de France, FA Cup)		League cup (Note: Includes Coupe de la Ligue, Football League/EFL Cup)		Europe		Other		Total	
Club	Season	Division	Apps	Goals	Apps	Goals	Apps	Goals	Apps	Goals	Apps	Goals	Apps	Goals
Osasuna B	2006–07	Segunda División B	24	1	—		—		—		—		24	1
Osasuna B	2007–08	Segunda División B	3	0	—		—		—		—		3	0
Osasuna B	Total		27	1	—		—		—		—		27	1
Osasuna	2006–07	La Liga	1	0	1	0	—		1 (Note: Appearance in UEFA Cup)	0	—		3	0
Osasuna	2007–08	La Liga	29	0	0	0	—		—		—		29	0
Osasuna	2008–09	La Liga	36	0	2	0	—		—		—		38	0
Osasuna	2009–10	La Liga	33	0	5	0	—		—		—		38	0
Osasuna	Total		99	0	8	0	—		1	0	—		108	0
Marseille	2010–11	Ligue 1	15	0	0	0	1	1	4 (Note: Appearances in UEFA Champions League)	0	1 (Note: Appearance in Trophée des Champions)	0	21	1
Marseille	2011–12	Ligue 1	30	1	3	0	3	0	8	0	0	0	44	1
Marseille	2012–13	Ligue 1	2	0	—		—		1 (Note: Appearance(s) in UEFA Europa League)	0	—		3	0
Marseille	Total		47	1	3	0	4	1	13	0	1	0	68	2
Chelsea	2012–13	Premier League	27	0	5	0	5	0	9 (Note: One appearance in UEFA Champions League, eight appearances in UEFA Europa League)	0	2 (Note: Appearances in FIFA Club World Cup)	0	48	0
Chelsea	2013–14	Premier League	29	0	2	0	3	1	10	0	0	0	44	1
Chelsea	2014–15	Premier League	29	0	2	0	5	0	4	0	—		40	0
Chelsea	2015–16	Premier League	37	2	3	0	0	0	8	0	1 (Note: Appearance in FA Community Shield)	0	49	2
Chelsea	2016–17	Premier League	38	1	6	0	3	1	—		—		47	2
Chelsea	2017–18	Premier League	37	2	4	0	2	0	8	1	1	0	52	3
Chelsea	2018–19	Premier League	38	1	3	0	6	0	9	0	1	0	57	1
Chelsea	2019–20	Premier League	36	2	5	0	0	0	7	2	1 (Note: Appearance in UEFA Super Cup)	0	49	4
Chelsea	2020–21	Premier League	26	1	4	0	2	0	11	0	—		43	1
Chelsea	2021–22	Premier League	27	1	4	1	4	0	9	1	3 (Note: One appearance in UEFA Super Cup, two appearances in FIFA Club World Cup)	0	47	3
Chelsea	2022–23	Premier League	25	0	1	0	1	0	5	0	—		32	0
Chelsea	Total		349	10	39	1	31	2	80	4	9	0	508	17
Atlético Madrid	2023–24	La Liga	25	0	2	0	—		6	0	1 (Note: Appearance in Supercopa de España)	0	34	0
Atlético Madrid	2024–25	La Liga	14	1	4	0	—		2	0	0	0	20	1
Atlético Madrid	Total		39	1	6	0	—		8	0	1	0	54	1
Sevilla	2025–26	La Liga	17	0	0	0	—		—		—		17	0
Career total			578	13	56	1	35	3	102	4	11	0	782	21

=== International ===
Appearances and goals by national team and year
National team	Year	Apps	Goals
Spain	2013	4	0
Spain	2014	6	0
Spain	2015	2	0
Spain	2016	6	0
Spain	2017	2	0
Spain	2018	5	0
Spain	2019	0	0
Spain	2020	0	0
Spain	2021	11	1
Spain	2022	8	0
Total		44	1

Spain score listed first, score column indicates score after each Azpilicueta goal

List of international goals scored by César Azpilicueta
No.	Date	Venue	Cap	Opponent	Score	Result	Competition
1	28 June 2021	Parken Stadium, Copenhagen, Denmark	27	Croatia	2–1	5–3 (a.e.t.)	UEFA Euro 2020

== Honours ==
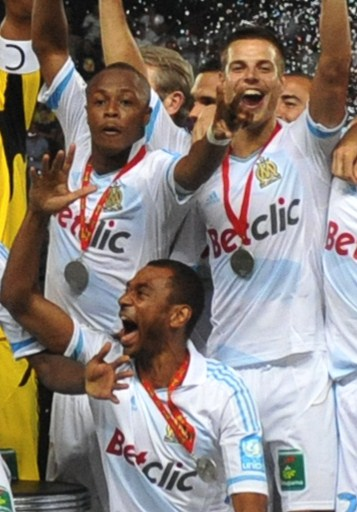
Azpilicueta (standing right), André Ayew and Édouard Cissé celebrate winning the 2011 Trophée des Champions with Marseille.

Marseille

- Coupe de la Ligue: 2011–12
- Trophée des Champions: 2010, 2011

Chelsea

- Premier League: 2014–15, 2016–17
- FA Cup: 2017–18; runner-up: 2016–17, 2019–20, 2020–21, 2021–22
- Football League/EFL Cup: 2014–15; runner-up: 2018–19, 2021–22
- UEFA Champions League: 2020–21
- UEFA Europa League: 2012–13, 2018–19
- UEFA Super Cup: 2021
- FIFA Club World Cup: 2021; runner-up: 2012

Spain U19

- UEFA European Under-19 Championship: 2007

Spain U21

- UEFA European Under-21 Championship: 2011

Spain

- FIFA Confederations Cup runner-up: 2013
- UEFA Nations League runner-up: 2020–21

Individual

- Chelsea Players' Player of the Year: 2013–14
- UEFA Europa League Squad of the Season: 2018–19
- UEFA Champions League Squad of the Season: 2020–21

Sporting positions
Preceded by Gary Cahill	Chelsea F.C. captain 2019–2023	Succeeded by Reece James
