= 2016–17 Chelsea F.C. season =

English football club season

Chelsea
2016–17 season
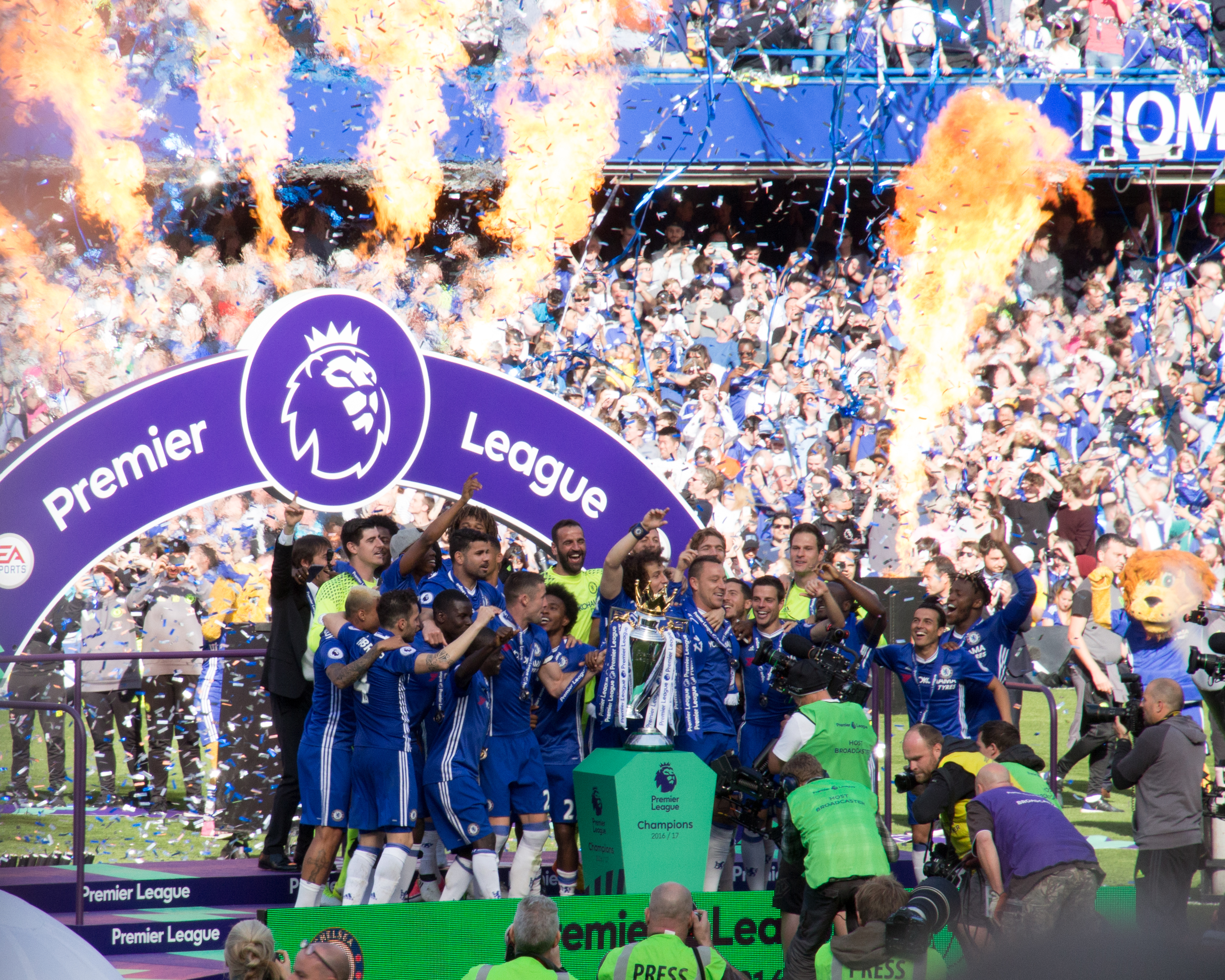
- Chelsea crowned English football champions for the sixth time
- Owner: Roman Abramovich
- Chairman: Bruce Buck
- Head coach: Antonio Conte
- Stadium: Stamford Bridge
- Premier League: 1st
- FA Cup: Runners-up
- League Cup: Fourth round
- Top goalscorer: League: Diego Costa (20); All: Diego Costa (22)
- Highest home attendance: 41,618 vs Sunderland (21 May 2017)
- Lowest home attendance: 39,266 vs Bristol Rovers (23 August 2016)
- Average home league attendance: 41,507
Home colours	Away colours	Third colours

The 2016–17 season was Chelsea's 103rd competitive season, 28th consecutive season in the top flight of English football, 25th consecutive season in the Premier League and 112th year in existence as a football club. In addition to the domestic league, Chelsea participated in the FA Cup and League Cup; however, they did not participate in any UEFA competition for the first time since the 1996–97 season. The season covered the period from 1 July 2016 to 30 June 2017.

Chelsea won their fifth Premier League title with a 1–0 win away to West Bromwich Albion on 12 May. Chelsea controversially lost the FA Cup Final to Arsenal after a 2–1 loss on 27 May. This season was the last for John Terry, who announced he would leave when his contract ended at the end of the season.

The season saw Chelsea equal the Premier League records for consecutive wins in a season (13), fewest draws in a season (3), fewest home draws in a season (0), and home and away wins against different sides (12). They also managed to break the record for number of wins in a season (30), as well as record the second-highest points tally in Premier League history (93).

== Team kits ==
Supplier: Adidas / Sponsor: Yokohama Tyres

Home	Home alt.	Away	Third	Goalkeeper 1	Goalkeeper 2

== Month by month review ==
=== June ===
On 9 June, Vitesse signed an extension on Nathan's loan and then two weeks later also signed an extension on Lewis Baker's loan.

On 13 June, Chelsea announced it had released Marco Amelia and Kevin Wright, and also confirmed that loanees Radamel Falcao and Alexandre Pato would be returning to their respective teams. After spending a season-and-a-half on loan at Udinese, Udinese activated a clause in Stipe Perica's contract to sign him permanently.

On 22 June, Charly Musonda's loan at Real Betis was extended for the 2016–17 campaign. On 27 June Chelsea youngster Kyle Scott joined Dutch club Willem II on trial after handing in multiple transfer requests in April 2016. On 29 June, Nathan Aké joined AFC Bournemouth on loan after a successful loan season with Watford in 2015–16.

In June, Chelsea submitted a total of three bids for Roma's Radja Nainggolan, with the third reportedly valued at €40 million; the player ultimately decided to stay after receiving an improved contract from Roma the following month.

=== July ===
On 1 July, it was announced that Pedro would switch to the number 11 shirt, recently vacated by the loan expiration of Alexandre Pato.

On 3 July, Michy Batshuayi signed a five-year deal at Chelsea after an accepted bid of €40 million (£33.2 million). Batshuayi became the first signing by new Chelsea manager Antonio Conte. After being linked with multiple teams, on 6 July Jérémie Boga joined La Liga side Granada on a season-long loan.

After months of speculation, promising right-back Ola Aina signed a new four-year contract. Although Tika Musonda was on the release list, Chelsea opted to give him a new one-year contract.

On 11 July, Chelsea under-21 assistant manager Andy Myers joined Vitesse on a one-year deal as Henk Fraser's assistant manager. With Myers joining the Dutch side, Ian Howell is promoted as the new U-21 assistant manager.

On 12 July, Players' Player of the Year Willian signed a new four-year contract. On 13 July, Tomáš Kalas returned to the Championship, joining Fulham on a season-long loan. After promotion to the first-team in the previous season, Kasey Palmer joins Huddersfield Town on 15 July. On 20 July, Kiwomya joined League 2 side Crewe Alexandra on loan until 9 January 2017. On 22 July, it was announced that Matej Delač would join Belgian side Mouscron-Péruwelz on a season-long loan.

John Swift was given a new contract in June, but decided to turn it down to sign with Championship side Reading on 14 July.

On 16 July, N'Golo Kanté signed a five-year contract with Chelsea valued at £30 million from Leicester City, becoming Conte's second signing.

Chelsea lost its first pre-season match, against Rapid Wien, which ended in a 2–0 defeat. In the following match of its Austrian tour, Chelsea won 3–0 against Wolfsberger AC, with youngsters Bertrand Traoré, Ruben Loftus-Cheek and Nathaniel Chalobah each scoring a goal. The following day, Chelsea had a closed-door friendly with local team Atus Ferlach, ending its Austrian tour with an 8–0 win over the champions of the Austrian fourth-tier Kärntner Liga.

On 28 July, Chelsea started its tour of the United States with a 1–0 victory over Premier League rival Liverpool thanks to an early goal from Gary Cahill. On 30 July, Chelsea set a record during the 3–2 loss against Real Madrid, with a record attendance of 105,826.

=== August ===
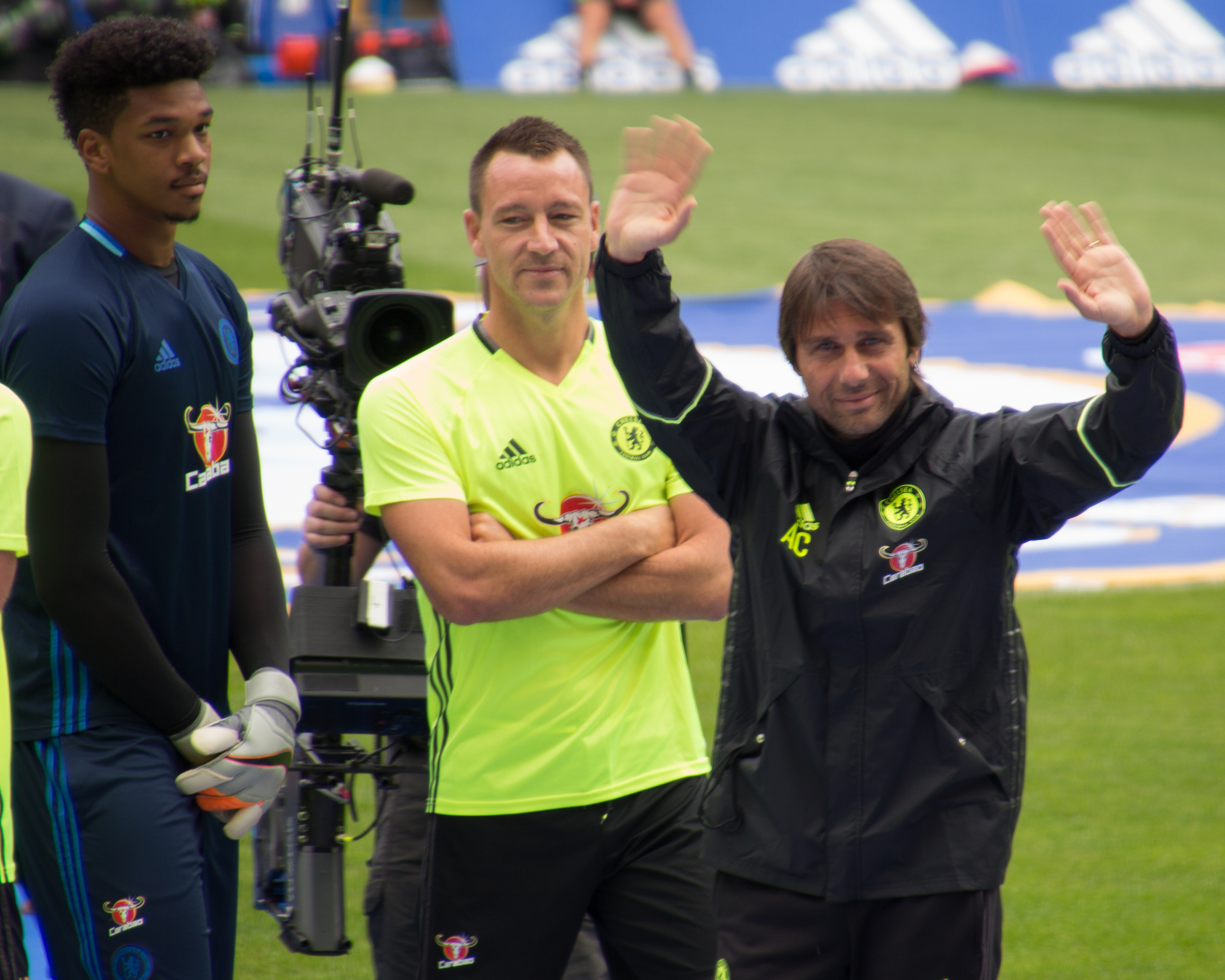
Antonio Conte (arms raised) at an open training session, five days before his first Premier League match.

Youngsters Fikayo Tomori and Mukhtar Ali both signed new long-term contracts.

On 2 August, Baba Rahman returned to the Bundesliga on a season-long loan with Schalke 04 after failing to impress Conte during the pre-season. Although Roma announced the signing Mohamed Salah back in October 2015, on 3 August Chelsea finalised the move for an additional €15 million. On 5 August, Abraham signed for Championship side Bristol City on a season-long loan, with no recall clause and Papy Djilobodji joined Sunderland for a fee reported to be in the region of £8 million. On 6 August, Houghton joined Doncaster Rovers on loan until 3 January 2017.

On 3 August, in its U.S. tour, Chelsea defeated Milan 3–1. Chelsea concluded its pre-season campaign with a 4–2 victory over Werder Bremen.

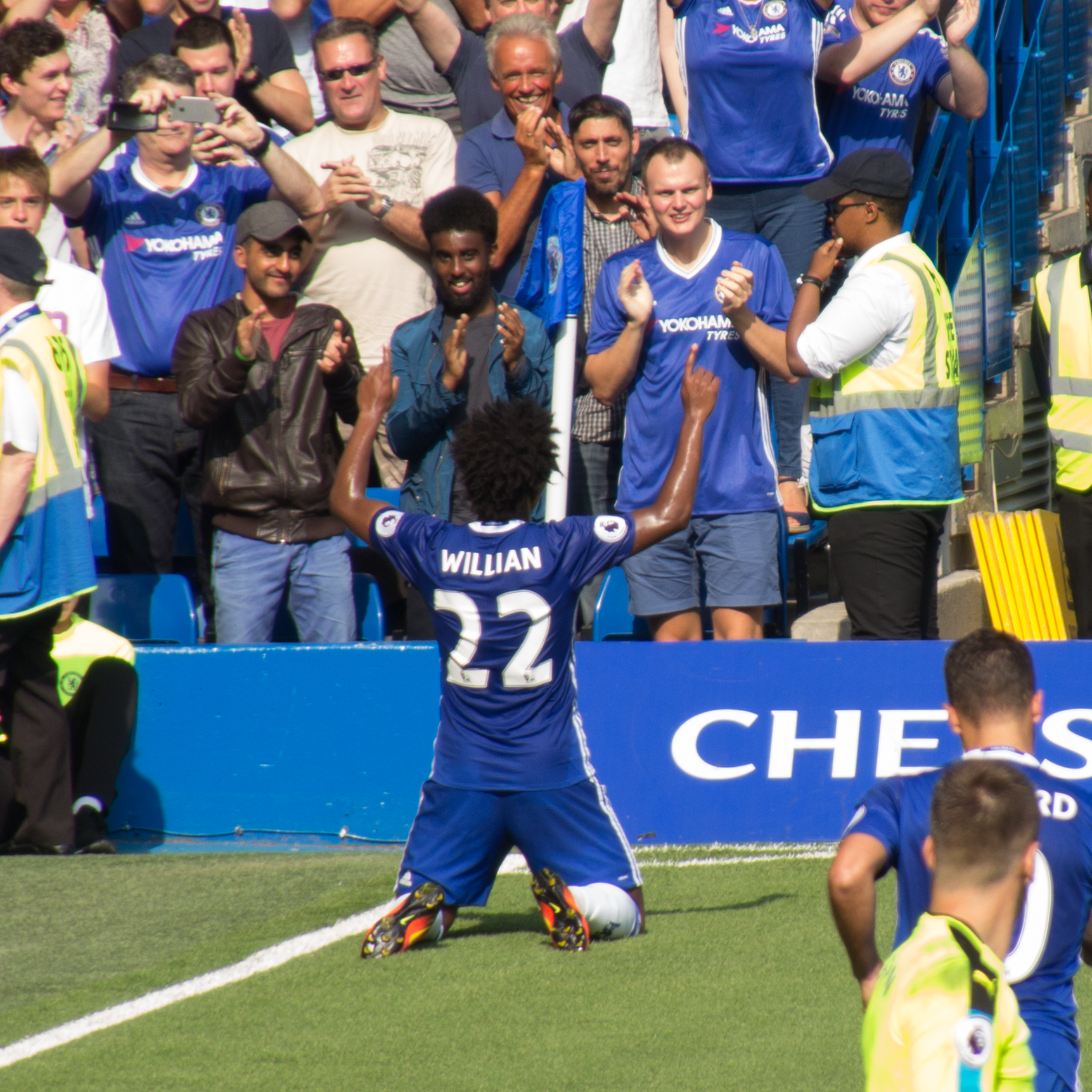
Willian celebrates his goal against Burnley, part of a 3–0 victory.

On 12 August, Bertrand Traoré signed a new three-year contract. He then joined Ajax on loan for the season while Danilo Pantić joined Excelsior on loan. On 14 August 2016, Michael Hector joined German side Eintracht Frankfurt on a season-long loan. On 15 August 2016, goalkeeper Jamal Blackman joined League Two side Wycombe Wanderers on loan until 3 January 2017, while Isaiah Brown joined Rotherham United on loan until the end of the 2016–17 season. On 23 August, Marko Marin joined Greek side Olympiacos on a three-year deal for a fee thought to be in the region of £3 million. On 25 August 2016, Eduardo joined Chelsea on free transfer, signing a one-year deal. On 27 August, Mario Pašalić joined Milan on a season-long loan.

On 30 August, strikers Patrick Bamford and Loïc Rémy joined Burnley and Crystal Palace respectively on season-long loans. Later in the day, Kenedy was also confirmed to have left on a season-long loan deal, to Watford.

Chelsea started its Premier League season with a 2–1 win over London rivals West Ham United, with goals scored by Eden Hazard and Diego Costa. In its second league game, Chelsea left it late yet again, scoring two late goals in the second half to earn their first away win of the season over Watford. Chelsea continued its winning streak after beating Bristol Rovers to advance to the third round of the EFL Cup.

On 27 August, in the 3–0 home victory over Burnley, goalkeeper Thibaut Courtois kept the first clean sheet of the season and broke a run of 13 home Premier League games without a clean sheet, with their last being in a 1–0 win over Norwich City in November 2015. In the month of August, Chelsea earned all nine available points and was in second place of the Premier League.

==== Last day of the transfer window ====
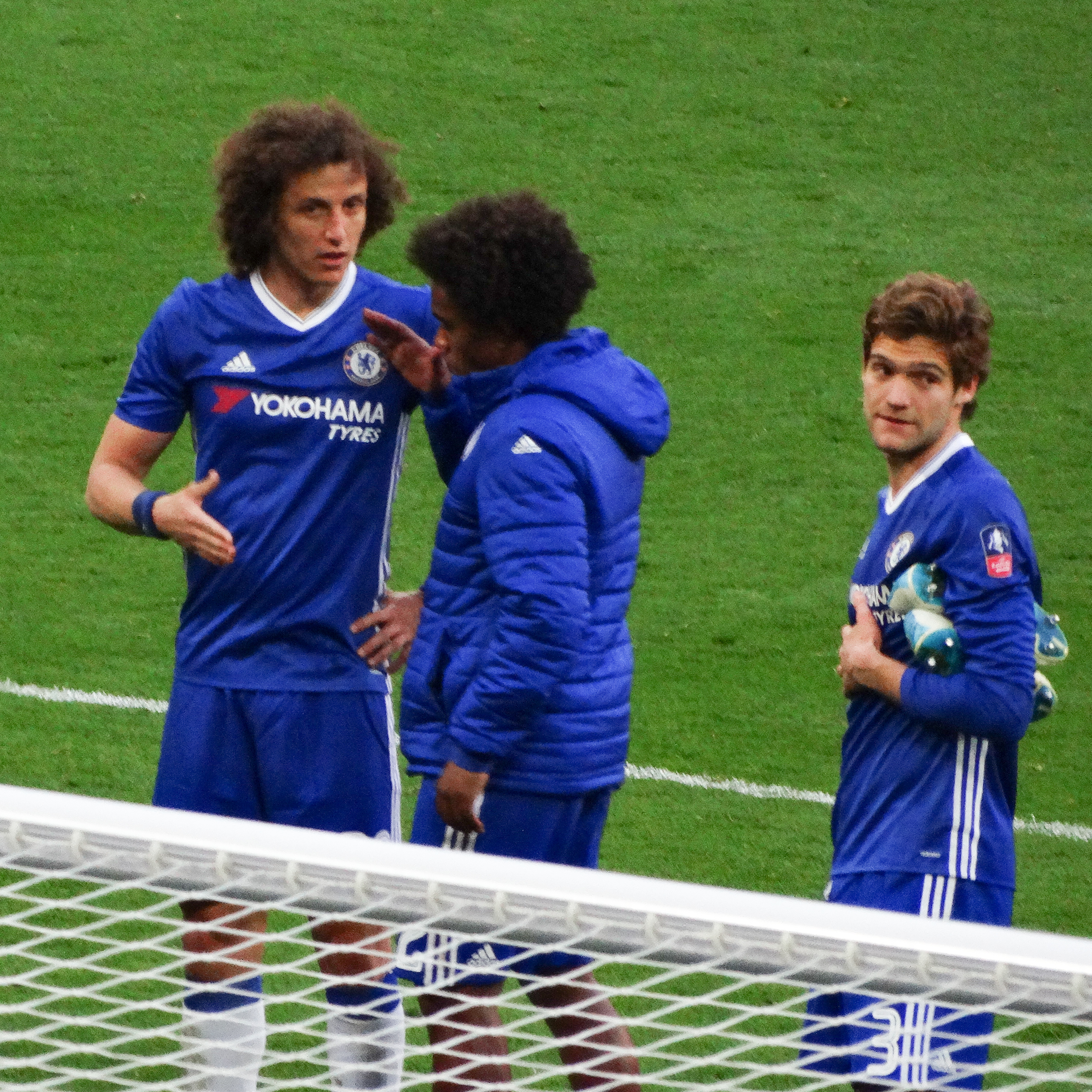
David Luiz and Marcos Alonso returned to the Premier League by signing for Chelsea on the last day of the 2016 summer transfer window.

On the last day of the transfer window, Chelsea completed a total of thirteen transfers, with 11 loan deals and two additions. Youngsters, Dion Conroy and Nathan Baxter, both joined up with semi-professional clubs, while Jake Clarke-Salter and Charlie Colkett both joined League One side Bristol Rovers. Lucas Piazon joined Tomáš Kalas at Fulham until 15 January 2017 while Christian Atsu joined Newcastle United on a season loan. Kenneth Omeruo returned to the Turkish league, joining newly promoted side Alanyaspor after signing a new contract until 2019. Cristián Cuevas returned to Sint-Truiden for a second season while Islam Feruz joined fellow loanee Matej Delač at Mouscron-Péruwelz. Matt Miazga joined up with the Dutch side Vitesse after his move to Espanyol fell through due to paperwork.

Juan Cuadrado would return on loan to Juventus for three seasons which will see Juventus pay a loan fee of €5 million a season, and also contain a buy-out clause €25 million with add-on clauses.

Marcos Alonso returned to the Premier League for a fee believed to be £23 million from Fiorentina, signing a five-year contract. Chelsea's last summer transfer deal was the £30 million signing of David Luiz, who returned to the London side from Paris Saint-Germain after joining PSG from Chelsea in 2014. His return was completed after he insisted on the move and stated that it was a "good deal" for the French champions after the club had initially refused the offer.

Position at the end of August
Pos	Team	Pld	W	D	L	GF	GA	GD	Pts	Qualification
1	Manchester City	3	3	0	0	9	3	+6	9	Qualification for the Champions League group stage
2	Chelsea	3	3	0	0	7	2	+5	9	Qualification for the Champions League group stage
3	Manchester United	3	3	0	0	6	1	+5	9	Qualification for the Champions League group stage
4	Everton	3	2	1	0	4	2	+2	7	Qualification for the Champions League play-off round
5	Hull City	3	2	0	1	4	2	+2	6	Qualification for the Europa League group stage

=== September ===
After the international break, Chelsea faced Swansea City at the Liberty Stadium in Wales on 11 September. The match ended in a 2–2 draw, with both of Chelsea's goals coming from Diego Costa. The draw meant that it was the first game of the season in which Chelsea dropped points. In the closing minutes, John Terry suffered an ankle injury and left the pitch on crutches; scans later showed that his injury was to rule him out for approximately ten days.

On 16 September, Chelsea suffered their first defeat of the season at home, as Liverpool won 2–1 at Stamford Bridge. David Luiz made his second Chelsea debut following his deadline day move from PSG. Two Liverpool goals in the first half, from Dejan Lovren's close range finish and Jordan Henderson's thunderous 25-yard strike, put the game out of reach for the hosts, who managed to peg one goal back through Diego Costa.

On 20 September, Chelsea beat Leicester City 4–2 after extra-time to advance into the fourth round of the EFL Cup. In the match, youngster Nathaniel Chalobah made his first-team debut and Gary Cahill served as captain for the first time.

Disappointment followed on 24 September in the form of another league defeat, this time a 3–0 defeat against Arsenal at the Emirates Stadium. Alexis Sánchez pounced in the 11th minute after a horrific defensive error from Gary Cahill let him roam free on goal, followed three minutes later by another goal from Theo Walcott. Mesut Özil then exposed Chelsea on the counter-attack five minutes before the break, putting the game beyond Chelsea's reach and sending them further down the league table. The win was also Arsenal's first against Chelsea in the league since October 2011. In the month of September, Chelsea earned only a single point out of nine available points and were in eighth place in the Premier League.

Position at the end of September
Pos	Team	Pld	W	D	L	GF	GA	GD	Pts
6	Manchester United	6	4	0	2	12	7	+5	12
7	Crystal Palace	7	3	2	2	11	8	+3	11
8	Chelsea	6	3	1	2	10	9	+1	10
9	Southampton	6	2	2	2	7	6	+1	8
10	West Bromwich Albion	6	2	2	2	7	6	+1	8

=== October ===
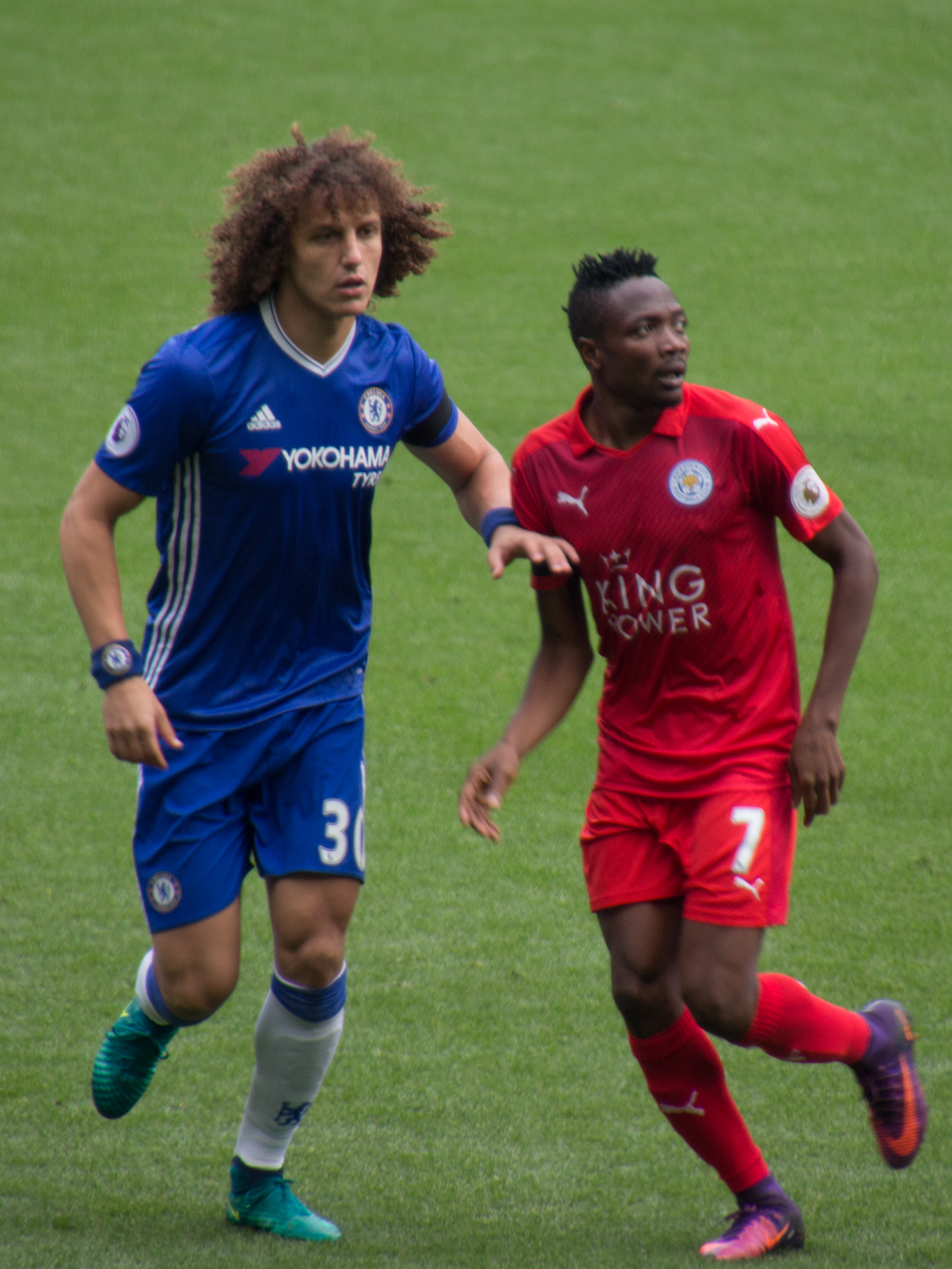
Luiz marks Ahmed Musa while Chelsea overcome champions Leicester City's challenge.

After suffering back-to-back Premier League losses to top-four rivals Liverpool and Arsenal, Antonio Conte switched to a 3–4–3 formation against Hull City on the 1 October which earned him a 2–0 victory, thanks to a goal apiece from Willian and Diego Costa. The new formation featured a back-three pairing of Gary Cahill, David Luiz and César Azpilicueta, with two wing-backs providing cover in the form of Marcos Alonso on the left-hand side and Victor Moses on the right-hand side.

On 15 October, Chelsea earned a 3–0 home victory over reigning Premier League champions Leicester. The hosts put in a domineering performance against the champions, with Diego Costa opening the scoring for Chelsea in the seventh minute. Two further goals followed from Eden Hazard and Victor Moses to inflict Leicester's fourth consecutive away league defeat. Leicester could have potentially pegged a goal back following David Luiz hitting his own goalpost as a result of himself attempting to clear a Leicester corner, however it would merely have been a consolation as Chelsea comfortably claimed another three points.

On 23 October, Chelsea stunned Manchester United and former manager José Mourinho at Stamford Bridge with a thumping 4–0 win. Chelsea went into the lead within 30 seconds of the match, thanks to Spanish winger Pedro capitalizing on poor defending with a goal. Gary Cahill smashed in the second after United allowed Eden Hazard's corner to bounce into their box. United offered little sign of making a comeback, falling further behind when Hazard drilled in a precise 15-yard strike. The game was well and truly over with a rare 70th-minute goal from N'Golo Kanté compounding Mourinho's misery on his return to Stamford Bridge. With this win, Chelsea had gone eight league games, winning four and drawing four, without losing against Manchester United, making it their best run against the Red Devils in club history.

Chelsea lost their next game, an EFL Cup game, 2–1 against West Ham at the newly renovated Olympic Stadium on 26 October 2016, knocking them out of the competition. The game was marred by crowd disturbances amongst both sets of rival fans, with plastic bottles, coins and seats being thrown across the London Stadium. Prior to the match, there had been nine arrests outside the stadium and 23 banning orders issued by West Ham for disorderly fan behaviour since moving into their new stadium.

Chelsea bounced back with a 2–0 win in the Premier League over Southampton at St Mary's Stadium on 30 October. The win meant Chelsea won all their Premier League matches in the month of October; a run of four wins, scoring 11 goals without conceding any. The last time Chelsea had a four-game winning run was April 2015 and the four consecutive clean sheets were also the first since August 2010 when Chelsea had a run of six consecutive Premier League games without conceding.

Position at the end of October
Pos	Team	Pld	W	D	L	GF	GA	GD	Pts	Qualification
2	Arsenal	10	7	2	1	23	10	+13	23	Qualification for the Champions League group stage
3	Liverpool	10	7	2	1	24	13	+11	23	Qualification for the Champions League group stage
4	Chelsea	10	7	1	2	21	9	+12	22	Qualification for the Champions League play-off round
5	Tottenham Hotspur	10	5	5	0	14	5	+9	20	Qualification for the Europa League group stage
6	Everton	10	5	3	2	15	8	+7	18	

=== November ===
On 5 November, Chelsea stunned Everton at Stamford Bridge with a 5–0 win. The hosts scored two goals in quick succession, coming from Eden Hazard and Marcos Alonso in the 19th and 20th minutes of the game. Diego Costa added a third goal before half time to seal the game, however Chelsea did not relent with two further goals coming in the second half, one of these being a Pedro goal into an open net. Everton were completely dominated throughout the whole game and penned into their own half, only having one off-target shot in comparison to Chelsea's 21 shots. With this win, Chelsea had five consecutive league victories, scoring 16 goals and conceding none in their last five games. The win also sent The Blues top of the Premier League table going into the international break.

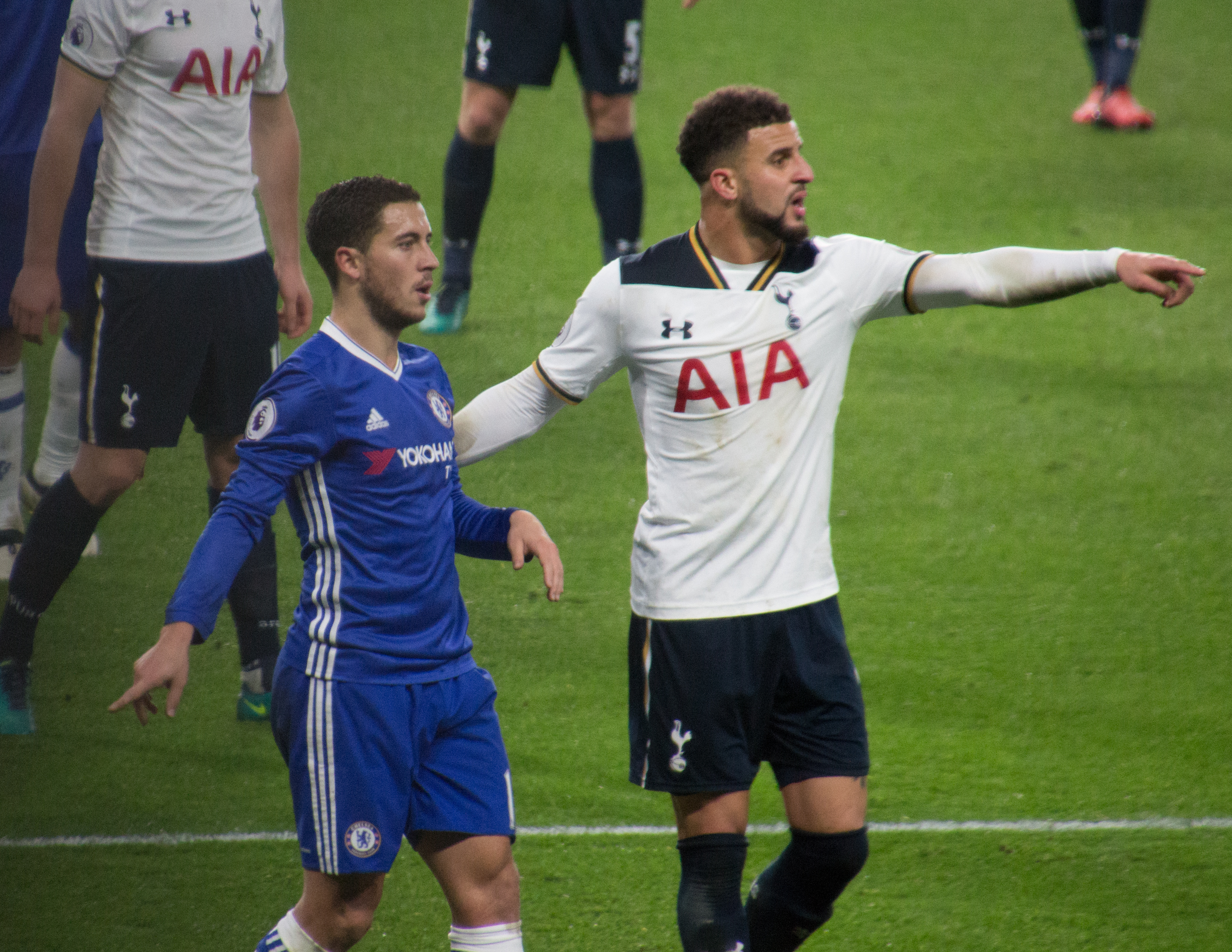
Premier League Player of the Month for October Eden Hazard and Tottenham Hotspur's Kyle Walker as Chelsea end Spurs' unbeaten run.

On 18 November, Chelsea's Eden Hazard and Antonio Conte both won the Premier League Player of the Month and the Premier League Manager of the Month awards respectively for the month of October.

On 20 November, Chelsea earned their sixth consecutive league victory, beating Middlesbrough 1–0 at the Riverside Stadium. In the process, Diego Costa became the first player to reach double digits in league goals when he scored his tenth goal of the season.

On 26 November, Chelsea ended Tottenham Hotspur's unbeaten run since the start of the Premier League season, where Chelsea won 2–1. Chelsea conceded their first goal since the 3–0 away defeat to Arsenal in the form of a fantastic long-distance strike from Tottenham's Christian Eriksen, and were dominated throughout much of the first half, however Chelsea were able to equalize just before half time with a spectacular right-footed curled effort from Pedro. Spurs' miserable record at Stamford Bridge was extended to 30 games without a win – dating back to February 1990 – after Victor Moses scored what proved to be the winner six minutes after the restart. The win ensured that Chelsea would enter the month of December top of the Premier League.

Position at the end of November
Pos	Team	Pld	W	D	L	GF	GA	GD	Pts	Qualification
1	Chelsea	13	10	1	2	29	10	+19	31	Qualification for the Champions League group stage
2	Liverpool	13	9	3	1	32	14	+18	30	Qualification for the Champions League group stage
3	Manchester City	13	9	3	1	29	12	+17	30	Qualification for the Champions League group stage
4	Arsenal	13	8	4	1	28	13	+15	28	Qualification for the Champions League play-off round
5	Tottenham Hotspur	13	6	6	1	19	10	+9	24	Qualification for the Europa League group stage

=== December ===
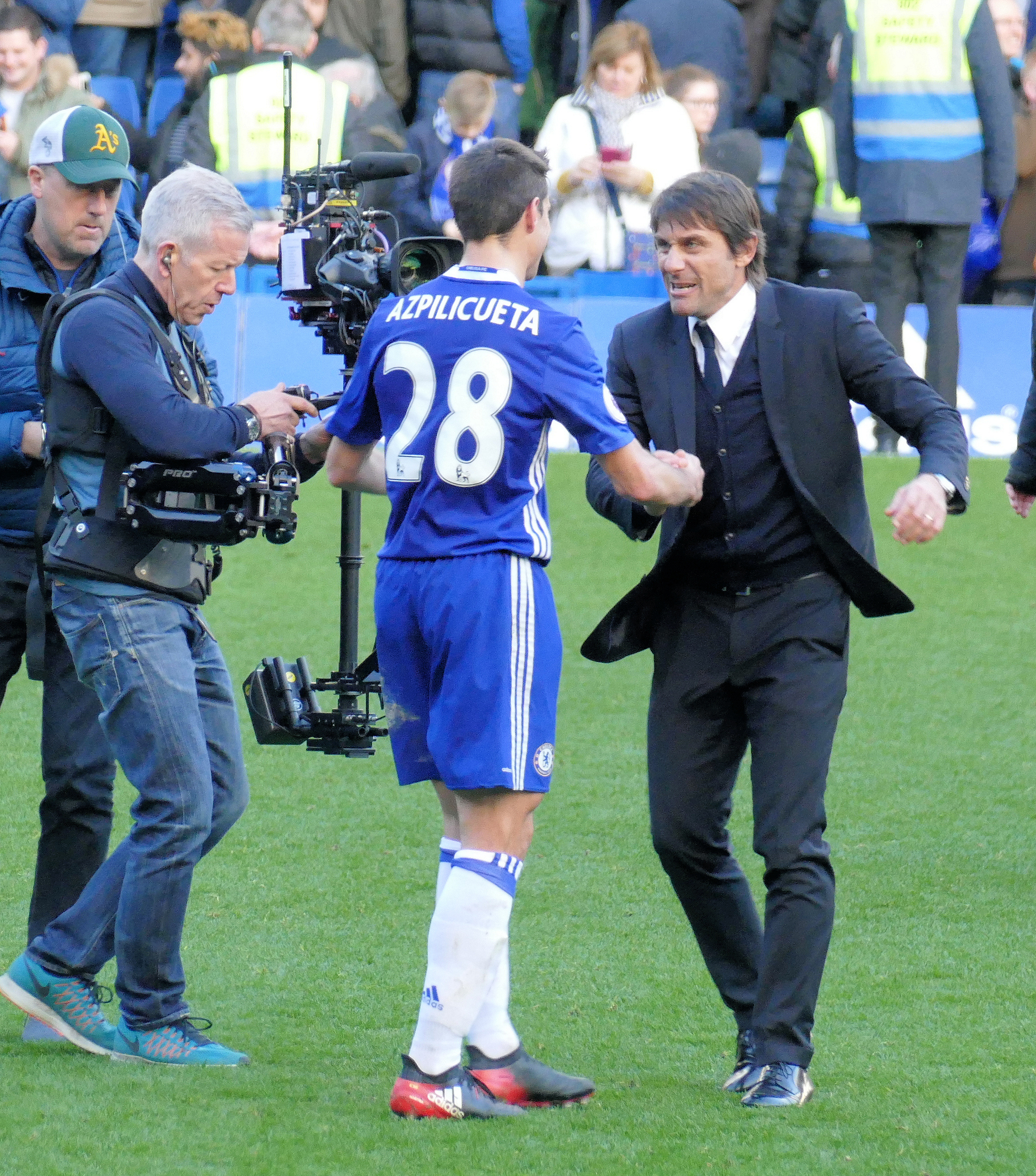
Conte and César Azpilicueta shake hands after Chelsea win over West Bromwich Albion.

On 3 December, Chelsea handed Manchester City their first home defeat after the Blues came back from a Gary Cahill own goal in the first half with three second-half goals to earn a 3–1 victory. The match ended in a wide-scale brawl that occurred as a result of a Sergio Agüero two legged lunge tackle on Chelsea defender David Luiz. Following the brawl, Agüero and Fernandinho were both sent off with straight red cards, Fernandinho being sent off due to his violent conduct against Chelsea midfielder Cesc Fàbregas. Agüero received a four-match ban for his actions, while Fernandinho received a three-match ban. Following the game, the FA charged both clubs involved with failing to control their player's on-pitch behaviour, with both clubs having until 8 December 2016 to respond to the charges.

On 9 December, Chelsea became the first club to collect three Premier League awards in the same month, picking up all the prizes for November: Diego Costa was named Player of the Month after registering two goals and two assists in three November contests; Antonio Conte was named Manager of the Month for the second successive month after guiding the club a perfect three wins out of three matches; and Pedro won Premier League Goal of the Month for November thanks to his curling effort from outside the box in the match against Spurs on 26 November.

On 11 December, Chelsea prevailed over West Bromwich Albion with a close 1–0 win, the only goal of the game coming in the 76th minute from Diego Costa, the Spaniard scoring his 12th goal of the season. The win sent Chelsea top of the table again, three points clear of second-placed Arsenal, and gave Chelsea their ninth consecutive league victory.

On 13 December, manager Antonio Conte confirmed that 20-year-old Brazilian winger Kenedy had returned to Chelsea from his loan spell at Watford. Kenedy had made just one substitute appearance for Watford during his loan spell.

On 14 December, Chelsea secured their tenth consecutive league victory with a 1–0 away win over Sunderland. Cesc Fàbregas scored his first league goal of the season in the 40th minute after an assist from Willian. Eden Hazard missed his first league game of the season after picking up a knock during the win over West Brom. César Azpilicueta made his 200th appearance for the Blues in the match, just one day after signing a three-and-a-half-year contract that will keep him at the club through the 2020 season.

On 17 December, Gary Cahill made his 300th appearance for the club as Chelsea narrowly won over Crystal Palace 1–0, away at Selhurst Park. The win takes Chelsea nine points clear of title chasers Liverpool and Arsenal, both having a game in hand over Chelsea. The win also meant that Chelsea are the third team in Premier League history to reach 500 league wins, after Arsenal and Manchester United. Chelsea also equal a club record with 11-straight league wins; Chelsea last achieved this feat from April to September 2009. Diego Costa and N'Golo Kanté both accumulated their fifth yellow cards of the season, resulting in themselves not being available for selection in the Boxing Day match against AFC Bournemouth. Diego Costa scored his 13th league goal of the season and his 50th for Chelsea since first signing. Diego Costa's 50th goal in 97 games for Chelsea meant that he eclipsed Didier Drogba's record of 50 goals in 112 games.

On 22 December, young Chelsea midfielder Charly Musonda made an early return from his loan spell at Real Betis after struggling for fitness and form while on loan. Musonda only made one start throughout his loan spell, having apparently fallen out with former Betis manager Gus Poyet.

On 23 December, Chelsea announced the permanent transfer of Oscar to Shanghai SIPG for a club record £52,000,000, to be completed within the January transfer window.

On 26 December, Chelsea earned their 12th straight league victory and broke their all-time record of successive league victories with a 3–0 home win over Bournemouth. A curled effort from Spanish winger Pedro, and a penalty from Eden Hazard in the 49th minute effectively sealed the game for the hosts. Chelsea's third, a stoppage time goal, came in the form of a Bournemouth own goal from defender Steve Cook, this being as a result of a Pedro shot deflecting off the Bournemouth defender and spinning over the goal line. Chelsea put up an encouraging performance in spite of having two of their key players, Diego Costa and N'Golo Kanté, suspended for the game. The win means that Chelsea remain top of the table and six points clear of second-placed Liverpool.

On 31 December, Chelsea equalled a top flight record of 13 consecutive wins in a single season with a thrilling 4–2 home victory over Stoke City. Goals from Gary Cahill with a headed effort, a second-half brace from Willian to help Chelsea regain the lead on two occasions in the match, and an 85th minute Diego Costa strike sent the Blues nine points clear of second-placed Liverpool going into the New Year, with Liverpool being able to cut the deficit to six points should they earn a victory against fellow title challengers Manchester City.

On the same day, Dutch midfielder Marco van Ginkel signed a new contract with the Blues, keeping him at Stamford Bridge until the end of the 2018–19 season, whilst also rejoining his former loan club PSV Eindhoven for the rest of the 2016–17 season.

Position at the end of December
Pos	Team	Pld	W	D	L	GF	GA	GD	Pts	Qualification
1	Chelsea	19	16	1	2	42	13	+29	49	Qualification for the Champions League group stage
2	Liverpool	19	13	4	2	46	21	+25	43	Qualification for the Champions League group stage
3	Manchester City	19	12	3	4	39	21	+18	39	Qualification for the Champions League group stage
4	Arsenal	18	11	4	3	39	19	+20	37	Qualification for the Champions League play-off round
5	Tottenham Hotspur	18	10	6	2	33	13	+20	36	Qualification for the Europa League group stage

=== January ===
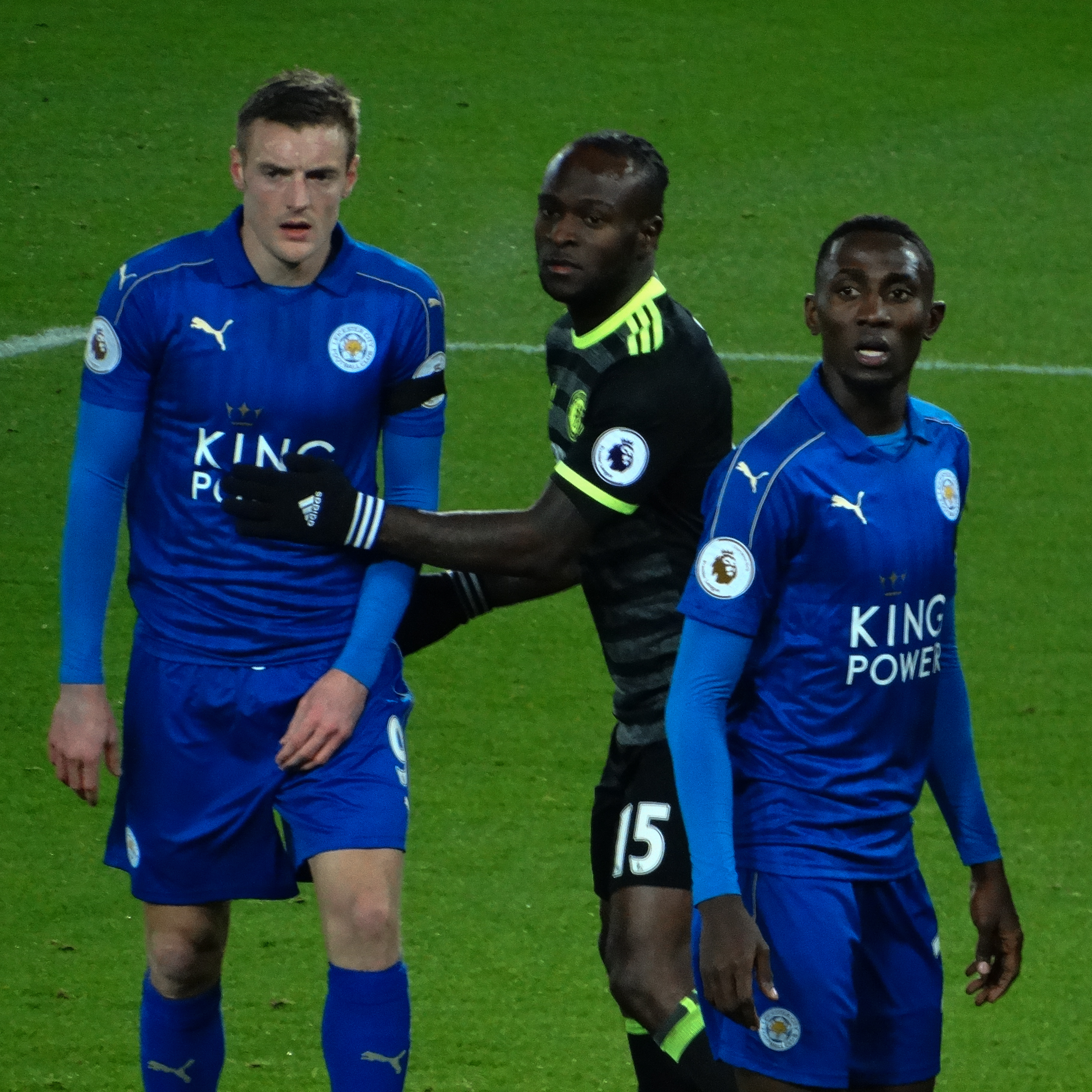
Victor Moses is sandwiched by Jamie Vardy and Wilfred Ndidi in Chelsea's third triumph this term over title-defending Leicester.

On 1 January, goalkeeper Jamal Blackman extended his loan spell with League Two club Wycombe Wanderers until the end of the 2016–17 season.

On 4 January, Tottenham ended Chelsea's 13-game winning run by defeating them 2–0 at White Hart Lane. A brace from midfielder Dele Alli with goals just before and after half time, prevented Chelsea from writing Premier League history with a fourteenth successive win. However, the result itself did not affect Chelsea's position in the Premier League, with the Blues remaining in first place and five points clear of second-placed Liverpool following their draw with Sunderland.

On 6 January, long-serving midfielder Mikel John Obi completed a move to Chinese Super League club Tianjin TEDA for an undisclosed fee, having played 376 times for the Blues since joining in 2006, winning two Premier League titles, four FA Cups and the 2012 Champions League during his time at Stamford Bridge. Mikel had not featured under new Chelsea boss Antonio Conte all season, with Mikel himself stating that the time was right for "a new challenge".

Besides, Chelsea recalled young forward Isaiah Brown from his loan spell at Rotherham United, with Huddersfield Town signing him on loan for the remainder of the 2016–17 season. He joins fellow Chelsea loanee Kasey Palmer at Huddersfield.

On 8 January, Chelsea defeated Peterborough United 4–1 at home in the third round of the FA Cup. Goals from Michy Batshuayi, Willian and a brace from Pedro ensured that Chelsea would advance into the fourth round. Chelsea captain John Terry was sent off on his first start for the club since October, but the Blues held on for a convincing victory over Posh.

On the same day, Chelsea exercised a recall clause in Dutch defender Nathan Ake's season-long loan deal at Premier League club Bournemouth, following some impressive performances for the south coast club.

On 13 January, Antonio Conte won the December Premier League Manager of the Month. As a result, he became the first manager in history to win the award in three successive months.

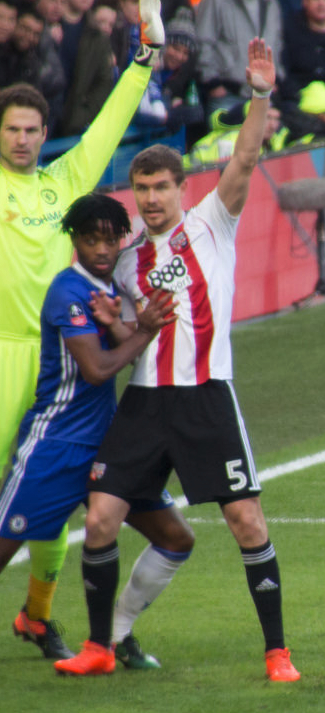
Crowded penalty area during the West London derby between Chelsea and Brentford.

On 14 January, Chelsea returned to winning ways in the league with a 3–0 victory over last season's Premier League champions Leicester City at the King Power Stadium. Marcos Alonso opened the scoring early on with Eden Hazard providing the assist, later scoring another to put the Blues 2–0 up shortly after half time. A third Chelsea goal from Pedro in the 71st minute secured up the three points for the away team, sending Chelsea seven points clear of second-placed Tottenham Hotspur at the summit of the Premier League. The win and three points also meant that Chelsea had surpassed their points total from the 2015–16 Premier League season, reaching 52 points compared to last season's 50 points.

On 17 January, Brazilian midfielder Lucas Piazon's loan at Fulham was extended until the end of the season.

On 18 January, young forward Patrick Bamford rejoined his former loan club Middlesbrough on a permanent basis for a reported £6 million.

On 22 January, The Blues defeated Hull City 2–0 at home. Diego Costa scored at his 100th appearance for the club at the 7th minute of first-half injury time. The long stoppage was a result of a clash of heads with between Gary Cahill and Hull midfielder Ryan Mason. Mason was sent to hospital and it was later confirmed that he sustained a skull fracture, while Cahill remained on the pitch and secured the victory with a header goal in the second half.

On 28 January, Chelsea defeated Brentford 4–0 at home in the West London derby in the fourth round of the FA Cup, Branislav Ivanović scored his first goal of the season and was later fouled to allow Michy Batshuayi to add a fourth from the penalty spot.

Youngsters Fikayo Tomori and Mukhtar Ali joined Brighton & Hove Albion and Vitesse respectively on loans until the end of the season.

On 31 January, Chelsea recorded their second draw of the season as they drew against Liverpool at Anfield. David Luiz scored a stunning freekick in the first half at his 100th Premier League appearance. It was also his first goal in his second spell at Chelsea. Georginio Wijnaldum equalised with his head after the break. The final result held to 1–1 after Diego Costa's penalty was saved by Simon Mignolet in the 76th minute. The Blues extended their lead at top of the Premier League to nine points as the two title contenders Arsenal and Tottenham Hotspur both dropped points on the same night.

Position at the end of January
Pos	Team	Pld	W	D	L	GF	GA	GD	Pts	Qualification
1	Chelsea	23	18	2	3	48	16	+32	56	Qualification for the Champions League group stage
2	Tottenham Hotspur	23	13	8	2	45	16	+29	47	Qualification for the Champions League group stage
3	Arsenal	23	14	5	4	51	25	+26	47	Qualification for the Champions League group stage
4	Liverpool	23	13	7	3	52	28	+24	46	Qualification for the Champions League play-off round
5	Manchester City	22	13	4	5	43	28	+15	43	Qualification for the Europa League group stage

=== February ===
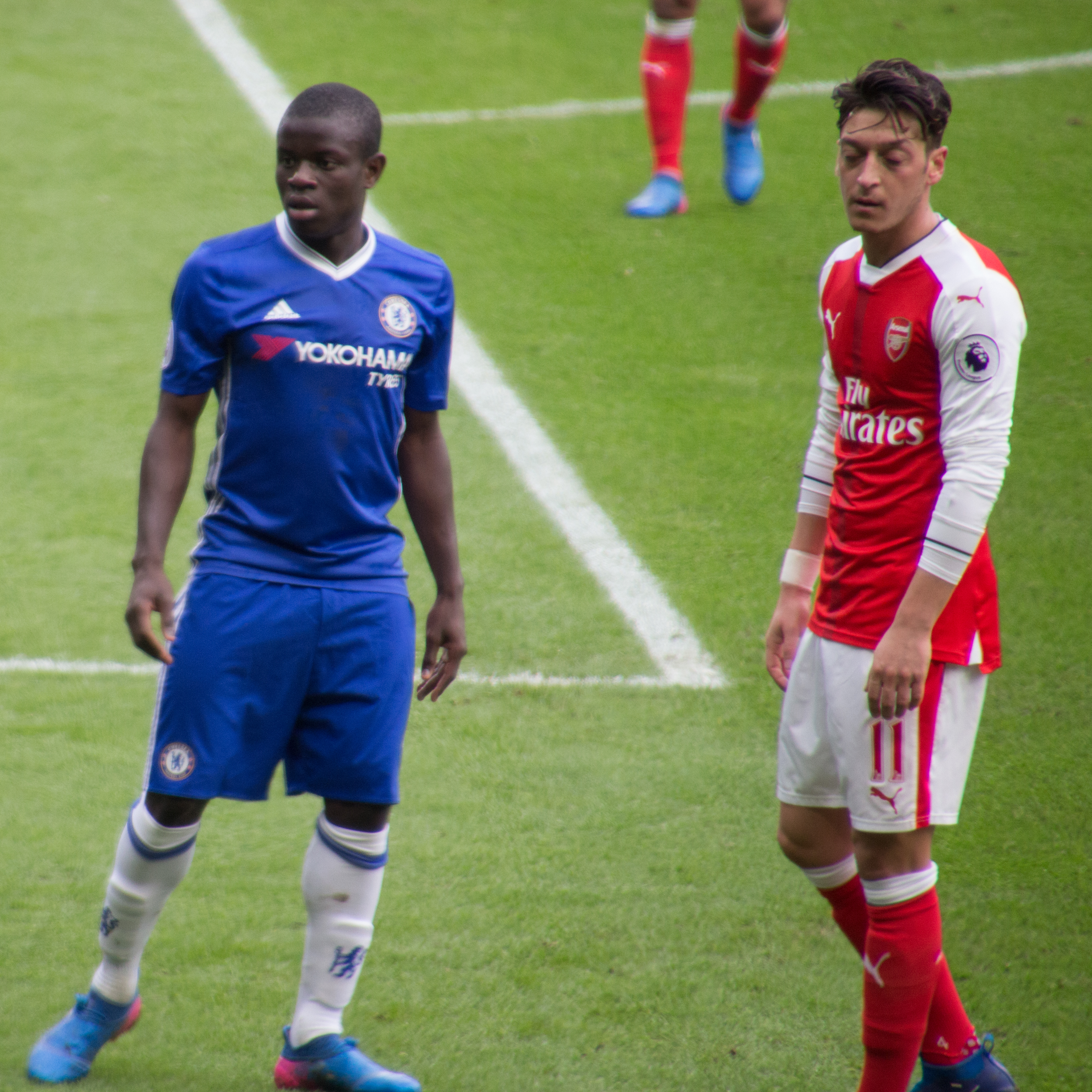
Midfielders N'Golo Kanté and Mesut Özil at Stamford Bridge, as Chelsea renew their rivalry against Arsenal.

On 1 February, Chelsea announced the departure of 32-year-old Serbian defender Branislav Ivanović. Ivanovic joined Russian side Zenit Saint Petersburg on a free transfer after nine years of service, having scored 34 goals in 377 appearances and won two Premier League medals, one Champions League medal, one Europa League medal, three FA Cup medals and one League Cup medal. He is also one of only five foreign players to reach the 300-game landmark for the Blues.

Branislav Ivanovic missed the 2012 UEFA Champions League Final due to suspension. However, he starred in the 2013 UEFA Europa League Final, scoring in the final minute of stoppage time to clinch a 2–1 win for Chelsea and with it their first Europa League title. He was subsequently named Man of the Match. Ivanovic was also outstanding during the title-winning campaign of 2014–15 and played in every minute of the 38 games. The Blues boasted the best defensive record in the league and he was one of six Chelsea players named in the Team of the Season. He ended his Chelsea career with a goal against Brentford in his final game.

On 4 February, Chelsea beat Arsenal 3–1 at home. Eden Hazard scored a magnificent solo goal in the 8th minute of second half. Cesc Fàbregas scored the third goal for the Blues against his former captained team, after an error by ex-Chelsea goalkeeper Petr Čech.

On the same day, the Blues announced that on 22 July, they would play Arsenal at Beijing National Stadium in preparation for next season.

Position at the end of February
Pos	Team	Pld	W	D	L	GF	GA	GD	Pts	Qualification
1	Chelsea	26	20	3	3	55	19	+36	63	Qualification for the Champions League group stage
2	Tottenham Hotspur	26	15	8	3	50	18	+32	53	Qualification for the Champions League group stage
3	Manchester City	25	16	4	5	51	29	+22	52	Qualification for the Champions League group stage
4	Arsenal	25	15	5	5	54	28	+26	50	Qualification for the Champions League play-off round
5	Liverpool	26	14	7	5	55	33	+22	49	Qualification for the Europa League group stage

=== March ===
On 8 March, Chelsea returned to the Olympic Stadium to face West Ham; this time the home side were beaten.

On 13 March, a goal from N'Golo Kanté in the FA Cup quarter-finals put holders Manchester United out of the tournament.

On 18 March, Chelsea won at Stoke 2–1, thus emerging from March unbeaten.

Position at the end of March
Pos	Team	Pld	W	D	L	GF	GA	GD	Pts	Qualification
1	Chelsea	28	22	3	3	59	21	+38	69	Qualification for the Champions League group stage
2	Tottenham Hotspur	28	17	8	3	55	21	+34	59	Qualification for the Champions League group stage
3	Manchester City	28	17	6	5	54	30	+24	57	Qualification for the Champions League group stage
4	Liverpool	29	16	8	5	61	36	+25	56	Qualification for the Champions League play-off round
5	Manchester United	27	14	10	3	42	23	+19	52	Qualification for the Europa League group stage

=== April ===
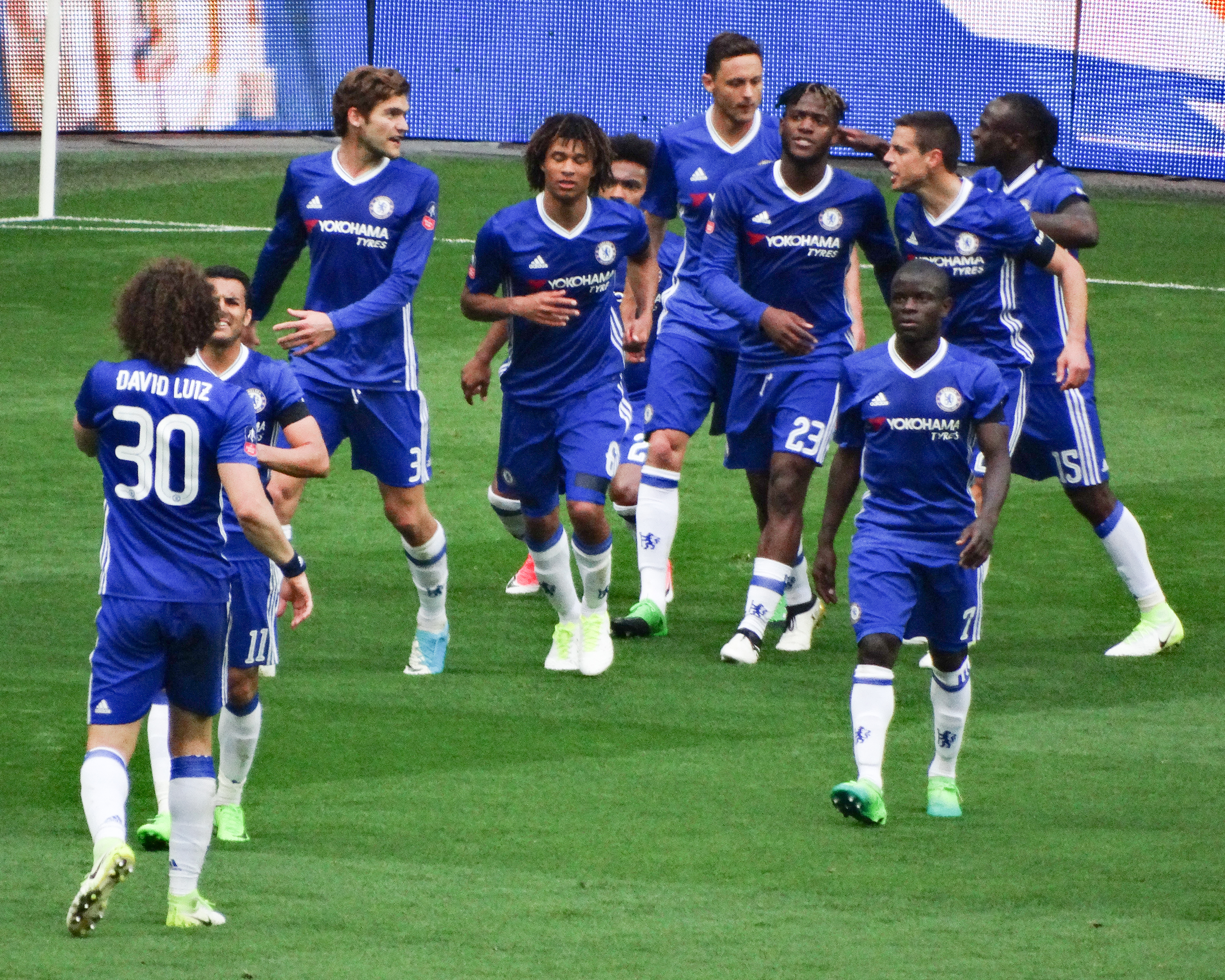
Chelsea players in their FA Cup semi-final against Tottenham, an all-London affair at Wembley Stadium.

On 1 April, having taken the lead through Cesc Fàbregas, Chelsea lost 2–1 at home to South London club Crystal Palace, with all the goals being scored in the first eleven minutes.

On 5 April, Chelsea return to winning ways with a 2–1 home win over Manchester City.

On 16 April, Manchester United exacted revenge for being eliminated from the FA Cup the previous month with league victory over Chelsea at Old Trafford.

On 22 April, Chelsea won their FA Cup semi-final at the neutral venue of Wembley Stadium, despatching Tottenham 4–2.

On 25 April, Chelsea were 4–2 winners over Southampton: Eden Hazard and Gary Cahill netting in the first half and a Diego Costa double in the second-half; former Blues Oriol Romeu and Ryan Bertrand scored for Saints.

On 30 April, Chelsea won at Everton 3–0, featuring an "effort from outside the box" scored by Pedro, Gary Cahill scoring in his second consecutive game, and an 86th-minute strike from Willian.

Position at the end of April
Pos	Team	Pld	W	D	L	GF	GA	GD	Pts	Qualification
1	Chelsea (Q)	34	26	3	5	72	29	+43	81	Qualification for the Champions League group stage
2	Tottenham Hotspur (T)	34	23	8	3	71	22	+49	77	Qualification for the Champions League group stage
3	Liverpool	34	19	9	6	70	42	+28	66	Qualification for the Champions League group stage
4	Manchester City	34	19	9	6	65	37	+28	66	Qualification for the Champions League play-off round
5	Manchester United (T)	34	17	14	3	51	25	+26	65	Qualification for the Europa League group stage

(Q) Qualified for the phase indicated; (T) Qualified, but not yet for the particular phase indicated

=== May ===
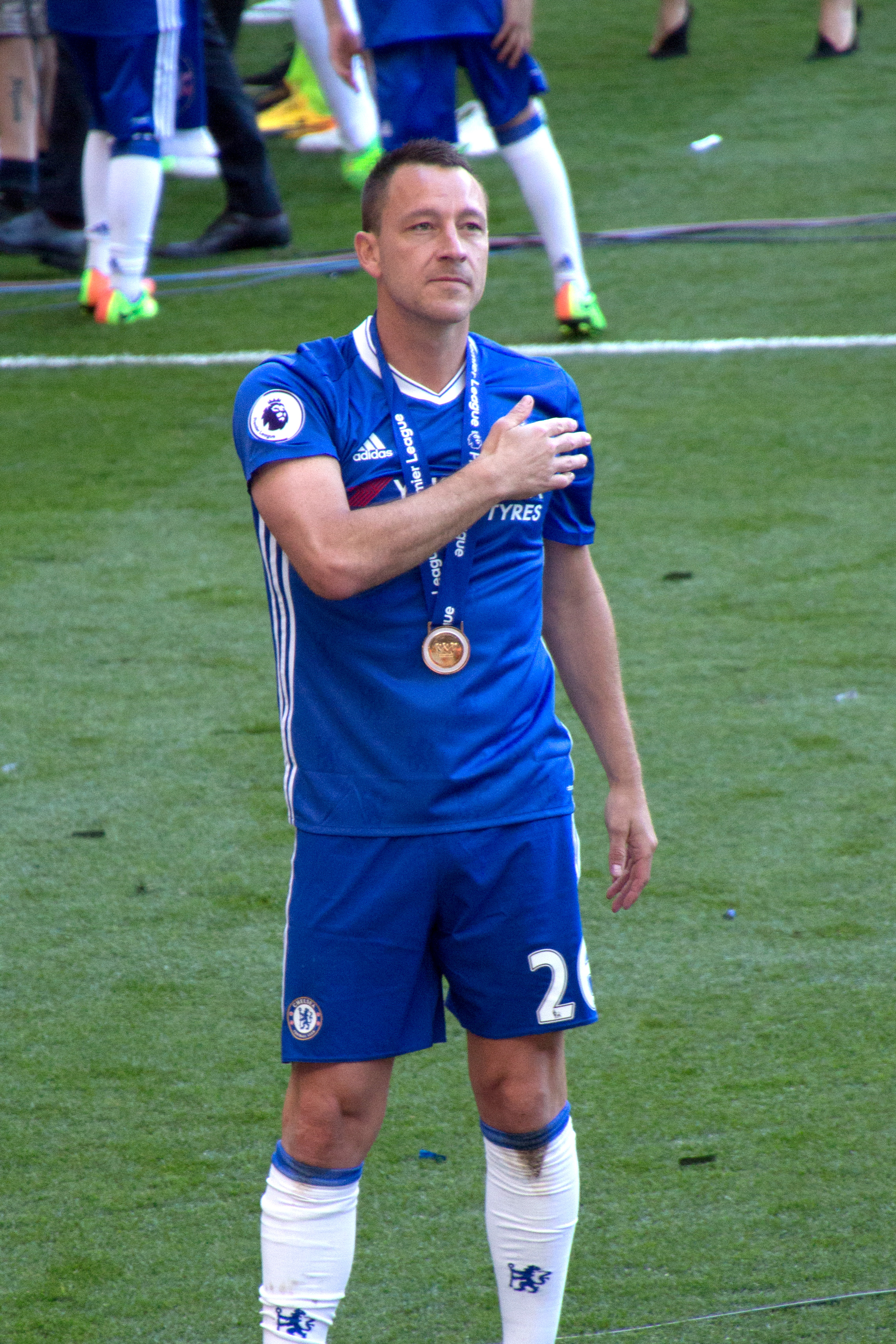
Captain John Terry after his final match for Chelsea.

On 8 May, goals from Diego Costa, Marcos Alonso and Nemanja Matić were enough to relegate visitors Middlesbrough back to the English Football League after just one season in the top-flight.

On 12 May, Chelsea defeated West Bromwich Albion 1–0 to clinch the Premier League title as they went ten points clear with two games remaining. Michy Batshuayi scored the winning goal in the 82nd minute. On the same day, Pedro was awarded his second – and Chelsea's third – Goal of the Month this season with his strike at Goodison Park.

On 15 May, a much-changed Chelsea side were 4–3 winners over Watford, with substitute Cesc Fàbregas finding the winner shortly before the away side had a man sent off, the other Blues goalscorers were John Terry, César Azpilicueta, and Michy Batshuayi. The Hertfordshire club gave the champions-elect that day a guard of honour; this included Kenedy, the player making his Chelsea league début having made one appearance for Watford earlier in the season before his loan deal was cancelled.

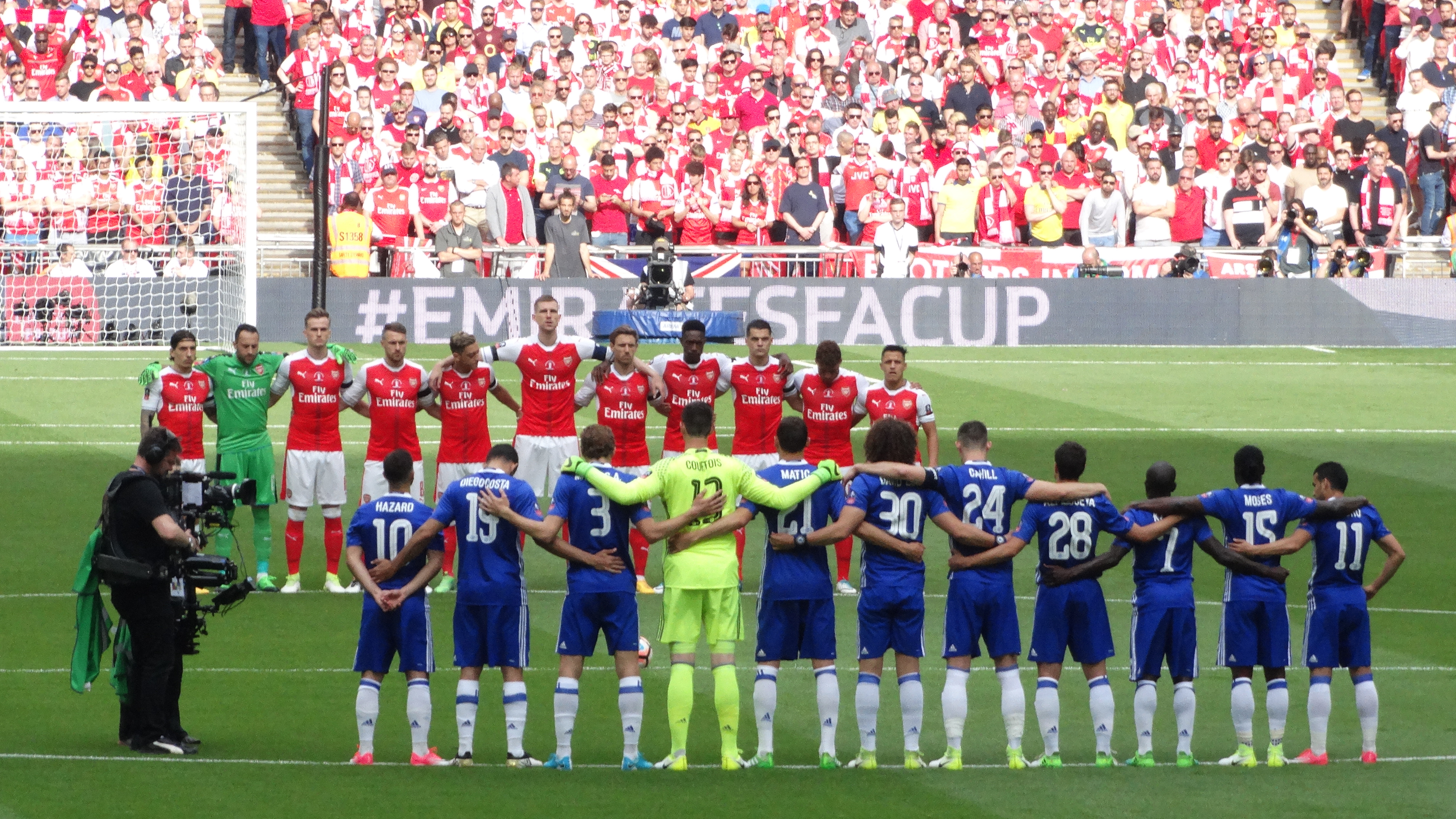
The line-ups for the 2017 FA Cup Final, won by Arsenal.

On 21 May, Chelsea defeated already-relegated Sunderland 5–1 with goals from Willian, Eden Hazard, Pedro and a brace from Michy Batshuayi – his fourth in three matches. It was the last league game for John Terry, who was subbed in the 26th minute to a standing ovation from all the supporters. This marked Chelsea's 30th league win this season, most by any team in a single Premier league season.

On 27 May, Chelsea controversially fell behind to Arsenal in the FA Cup Final in the fourth minute to Alexis Sánchez's goal. They were later reduced to ten men when Victor Moses received his second yellow card. However, despite Arsenal's extra-man advantage, Chelsea equalised through Diego Costa in the 76th minute. The London clubs would stay level for only three minutes before Arsenal's Aaron Ramsey headed in the winner.

==== Final league position ====
Pos	Team	Pld	W	D	L	GF	GA	GD	Pts	Qualification or relegation
1	Chelsea (C)	38	30	3	5	85	33	+52	93	Qualification for the Champions League group stage
2	Tottenham Hotspur	38	26	8	4	86	26	+60	86	Qualification for the Champions League group stage
3	Manchester City	38	23	9	6	80	39	+41	78	Qualification for the Champions League group stage
4	Liverpool	38	22	10	6	78	42	+36	76	Qualification for the Champions League play-off round
5	Arsenal	38	23	6	9	77	44	+33	75	Qualification for the Europa League group stage (Note: Arsenal qualified for the Europa League group stage by winning the 2016–17 FA Cup. As they had also qualified there by the virtue of their league position (5th), this spot was passed to the next-highest ranked team (6th), Manchester United.)

Source: Premier League
Rules for classification: 1) Points; 2) Goal difference; 3) Goals scored; 4) Play-offs (only if needed to decide champion, teams for relegation or teams for UEFA competitions).
(C) Champions

== Coaching staff ==
Position	Staff
First-team Manager	(Italy) Antonio Conte
Assistant Managers	(Italy) Angelo Alessio
Assistant Managers	(England) Steve Holland
Assistant Managers	(Italy) Gianluca Conte
Technical Director	(Nigeria) Michael Emenalo
Club Ambassador/Assistant to the First-team	(Italy) Carlo Cudicini
Goalkeeper Coach	(Italy) Gianluca Spinelli
Assistant Goalkeeper Coach	(Portugal) Henrique Hilário
Head Fitness Coaches	(Italy) Paolo Bertelli
Head Fitness Coaches	(Spain) Julio Tous
Head Fitness Coaches	(England) Chris Jones
Assistant Fitness Coach	(Italy) Constantino Coratti
Consultant Personal Trainer/Nutritionist	(Italy) Tiberio Ancora
Senior Opposition Scout	(England) Mick McGiven
Medical Director	(Spain) Paco Biosca
Head of Youth Development	(England) Neil Bath
Under-21 Team Manager	(England) Adi Viveash
Under-18 Team Manager	(England) Jody Morris
Head of Match Analysis Scout	(England) James Melbourne

Source: Chelsea F.C.

=== Other information ===
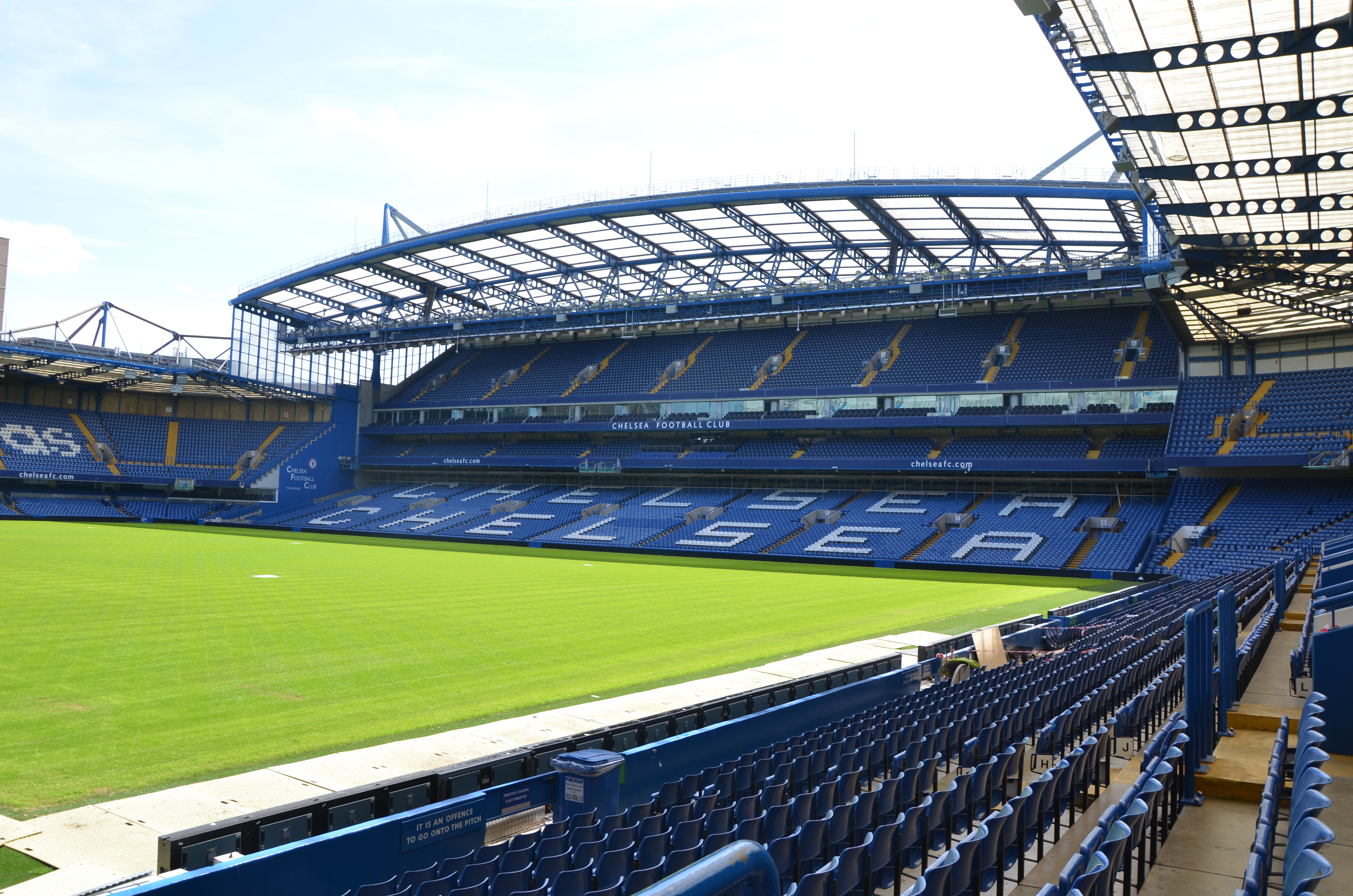
Stamford Bridge

Owner	(Russia) Roman Abramovich
Chairman	(United States) Bruce Buck
Directors	(Russia) (Canada) Marina Granovskaia (Ukraine) (Canada) Eugene Tenenbaum
Ground (capacity and dimensions)	Stamford Bridge (41,663 / 103x67 metres)
Training Ground	Cobham Training Centre

Source: Chelsea F.C.

== Squad information ==
=== First team squad ===
As of 1 February 2017.

Squad no.	Name	Nationality	Position(s)	Date of birth (age)
Goalkeepers
1	Asmir Begović HG^{1}	(Bosnia and Herzegovina)	GK	20 June 1987 (aged 29)
13	Thibaut Courtois	(Belgium)	GK	11 May 1992 (aged 25)
37	Eduardo	(Portugal)	GK	19 September 1982 (aged 34)
Defenders
3	Marcos Alonso	(Spain)	LWB / LB / CB	28 December 1990 (aged 26)
5	Kurt Zouma	(France)	CB / DM	27 October 1994 (aged 22)
6	Nathan Aké HG^{2}	(Netherlands)	LB / CB / DM	18 February 1995 (aged 22)
24	Gary Cahill HG^{1}	(England)	CB	19 December 1985 (aged 31)
26	John Terry HG^{2}	(England)	CB	7 December 1980 (aged 36)
28	César Azpilicueta	(Spain)	RB / LB / CB	28 August 1989 (aged 27)
30	David Luiz	(Brazil)	CB / DM	22 April 1987 (aged 30)
34	Ola Aina U21 HG^{2}	(England)	RB / LB	8 October 1996 (aged 20)
Midfielders
4	Cesc Fàbregas HG^{1}	(Spain)	CM / AM	4 May 1987 (aged 30)
7	N'Golo Kanté	(France)	CM / DM	29 March 1991 (aged 26)
10	Eden Hazard	(Belgium)	LW / AM / RW / CF	7 January 1991 (aged 26)
11	Pedro	(Spain)	RW / LW	28 July 1987 (aged 29)
14	Ruben Loftus-Cheek U21 HG^{2}	(England)	CM / AM / CF	23 January 1996 (aged 21)
15	Victor Moses HG^{1}	(Nigeria)	RWB / RW	12 December 1990 (aged 26)
16	Kenedy U21	(Brazil)	LW / CF	8 February 1996 (aged 21)
21	Nemanja Matić	(Serbia)	DM / CM	1 August 1988 (aged 28)
22	Willian	(Brazil)	RW / AM	9 August 1988 (aged 28)
29	Nathaniel Chalobah HG^{2}	(England)	DM / CM	3 December 1994 (aged 22)
35	Charly Musonda U21 HG^{2}	(Belgium)	LW / RW / AM	15 October 1996 (aged 20)
Strikers
19	Diego Costa	(Spain)	CF	7 October 1988 (aged 28)
23	Michy Batshuayi	(Belgium)	CF	2 October 1993 (aged 23)
41	Dominic Solanke U21 HG^{2}	(England)	CF	14 September 1997 (aged 19)

- HG^{1} = Association-trained player
- HG^{2} = Club-trained player
- U21 = Under-21 player

== New contracts ==
No.	Pos	Player	Contract length	Contract end	Date	Source
54	CB	(England) Trevoh Chalobah	3 years	2019	29 June 2016	
55	RB	(Sweden) Joseph Colley	3 years	2019	29 June 2016	
40	GK	(England) Nathan Baxter	2 years	2018	29 June 2016	
62	LW	(Scotland) Harvey St Clair	2 years	2018	29 June 2016	
77	CF	(England) Malakai Hinckson-Mars	2 years	2018	29 June 2016	
56	LB	(Wales) Cole Dasilva	1 year	2017	29 June 2016	
42	GK	(England) Bradley Collins	2 years	2018	1 July 2016	
—	RW	(England) Alex Kiwomya	1 year	2017	1 July 2016	
34	RB	(England) Ola Aina	4 years	2020	6 July 2016	
—	DM	(Belgium) Tika Musonda	1 year	2017	6 July 2016	
22	RW	(Brazil) Willian	4 years	2020	12 July 2016	
33	CB	(England) Fikayo Tomori	4 years	2020	1 August 2016	
45	CM	(England) Mukhtar Ali	2 years	2018	3 August 2016	
50	CM	(Scotland) Ruben Sammut	2 years	2018	4 August 2016	
61	RB	(England) Richard Nartey	1 year	2017	4 August 2016	
14	RW	(Burkina Faso) Bertrand Traoré	3 years	2019	12 August 2016	
—	CB	(Nigeria) Kenneth Omeruo	3 years	2019	31 August 2016	
—	RB	(England) Todd Kane	3 years	2019	23 September 2016	
28	RB	(Spain) César Azpilicueta	4 years	2020	13 December 2016	
73	CF	(England) Martell Taylor-Crossdale	3 years	2019	23 December 2016	
27	CM	(Netherlands) Marco van Ginkel	3 years	2019	31 December 2016	
—	DM	(England) Jordan Houghton	2 years	2018	1 January 2017	
66	GK	(England) Jamie Cumming	3 years	2019	5 January 2017	
59	CM	(England) Luke McCormick	2 years	2018	6 February 2017	
15	RW	(Nigeria) Victor Moses	4 years	2021	1 March 2017	
69	RM	(England) Reece James	3 years	2019	3 March 2017	
67	CM	(England) Conor Gallagher	3 years	2019	3 March 2017	
60	AM	(England) Mason Mount	5 years	2021	4 April 2017	
37	GK	(Portugal) Eduardo	1 year	2018	23 May 2017	

== Transfers ==
=== In ===
==== Summer ====
No.	Pos	Player	Transferred from	Fee	Date	Source
65	CM	(Netherlands) Juan Castillo	(Netherlands) Ajax	Free (scholar)	1 July 2016	
23	CF	(Belgium) Michy Batshuayi	(France) Marseille	£33,200,000	3 July 2016	
—	CF	(England) Charlie Brown	(England) Ipswich Town	Free (scholar)	9 July 2016	
7	CM	(France) N'Golo Kanté	(England) Leicester City	£32,000,000	16 July 2016	
75	GK	(Poland) Marcin Bułka	(Poland) FCB Escola Varsovia	Free (scholar)	29 July 2016	
37	GK	(Portugal) Eduardo	(Croatia) Dinamo Zagreb	Free	25 August 2016	
3	LB	(Spain) Marcos Alonso	(Italy) Fiorentina	£23,000,000	31 August 2016	
30	CB	(Brazil) David Luiz	(France) Paris Saint-Germain	£30,000,000	31 August 2016	

==== Winter ====
No.	Pos	Player	Transferred from	Fee	Date	Source
—	CB	(England) Kyle Jameson	(England) Southport	Free (scholar)	5 January 2017	

=== Out ===
==== Summer ====
No.	Pos	Player	Transferred to	Fee	Date	Source
—	CF	(Croatia) Stipe Perica	(Italy) Udinese	£3,400,000	1 July 2016	
—	LW	(England) Reece Mitchell	(England) Chesterfield	Free	1 July 2016	
—	CM	(England) John Swift	(England) Reading	Free	14 July 2016	
—	RW	(Egypt) Mohamed Salah	(Italy) Roma	£14,500,000	3 August 2016	
—	CB	(Senegal) Papy Djilobodji	(England) Sunderland	£8,000,000	5 August 2016	
—	AM	(Germany) Marko Marin	(Greece) Olympiacos	£3,000,000	23 August 2016	
—	LB	(Sierra Leone) Kevin Wright	(England) Carlisle United	Free	1 December 2016	
—	CB	(England) Zech Medley	(England) Arsenal	Free	6 December 2016	
32	GK	(Italy) Marco Amelia	(Italy) Vicenza	Free	27 February 2017	

==== Winter ====
No.	Pos	Player	Transferred to	Fee	Date	Source
8	AM	(Brazil) Oscar	(China) Shanghai SIPG	£60,000,000	23 December 2016	
12	CM	(Nigeria) Mikel John Obi	(China) Tianjin TEDA	Undisclosed	6 January 2017	
—	CF	(England) Patrick Bamford	(England) Middlesbrough	£6,000,000	18 January 2017	
—	CB	(England) Dion Conroy	(England) Swindon Town	Undisclosed	27 January 2017	
2	CB	(Serbia) Branislav Ivanović	(Russia) Zenit Saint Petersburg	Free	1 February 2017	

=== Loan out ===
==== Summer ====
No.	Pos	Player	Loaned to	Start	End	Source
—	RB	(Brazil) Wallace	(Brazil) Grêmio	7 January 2016	30 June 2017	
—	LB	(Netherlands) Nathan Aké	(England) Bournemouth	1 July 2016	8 January 2017 (Note: On 8 January 2017, Ake's loan spell was terminated.)	
—	CM	(England) Lewis Baker	(Netherlands) Vitesse	1 July 2016	30 June 2017	
—	GK	(England) Mitchell Beeney	(England) Crawley Town	1 July 2016	3 January 2017	
—	CB	(Denmark) Andreas Christensen	(Germany) Borussia Mönchengladbach	1 July 2016	30 June 2017	
—	LW	(Belgium) Charly Musonda	(Spain) Real Betis	1 July 2016	1 January 2017 (Note: On 1 January 2017, Musonda's loan spell was terminated.)	ov
—	LW	(Brazil) Nathan	(Netherlands) Vitesse	1 July 2016	30 June 2017	
—	CF	(Colombia) Joao Rodríguez	(Colombia) Santa Fe	1 July 2016	1 January 2017 (Note: On 28 December 2016, Rodríguez's loan spell was terminated.)	
—	AM	(Ivory Coast) Jérémie Boga	(Spain) Granada	6 July 2016	30 June 2017	
—	CB	(Czech Republic) Tomáš Kalas	(England) Fulham	13 July 2016	30 June 2017	
38	AM	(England) Kasey Palmer	(England) Huddersfield Town	15 July 2016	30 June 2017	
—	RW	(England) Alex Kiwomya	(England) Crewe Alexandra	20 July 2016	30 June 2017	
—	DM	(Ivory Coast) Victorien Angban	(Spain) Granada	22 July 2016	30 June 2017	
—	GK	(Croatia) Matej Delač	(Belgium) Mouscron-Péruwelz	22 July 2016	30 June 2017	
6	LB	(Ghana) Baba Rahman	(Germany) Schalke 04	2 August 2016	30 June 2017 (Note: A £500,000 loan fee has been applied to the loan for Baba Rahman.)	
32	CF	(England) Tammy Abraham	(England) Bristol City	5 August 2016	30 June 2017	
—	CM	(England) Jordan Houghton	(England) Doncaster Rovers	6 August 2016	21 February 2017 (Note: On 1 January 2017, Jordan Houghton's loan at Doncaster Rovers was extended until the end of the season.) (Note: On 21 February 2017, Houghton's loan spell was terminated.)	
—	CB	(Scotland) Alex Davey	(England) Crawley Town	11 August 2016	3 January 2017	
14	RW	(Burkina Faso) Bertrand Traoré	(Netherlands) Ajax	12 August 2016	30 June 2017	
—	CM	(Serbia) Danilo Pantić	(Netherlands) Excelsior	12 August 2016	30 June 2017	
30	CB	(Jamaica) Michael Hector	(Germany) Eintracht Frankfurt	14 August 2016	30 June 2017	
27	GK	(England) Jamal Blackman	(England) Wycombe Wanderers	15 August 2016	30 June 2017 (Note: On 1 January 2017, Jamal Blackman's loan at Wycombe Wanderers was extended until the end of the season.)	
—	RW	(England) Isaiah Brown	(England) Rotherham United	15 August 2016	5 January 2017 (Note: On 5 January 2017, Brown's loan spell was terminated.)	
—	CM	(Croatia) Mario Pašalić	(Italy) Milan	27 August 2016	30 June 2017	
—	CF	(England) Patrick Bamford	(England) Burnley	30 August 2016	14 January 2017 (Note: On 14 January 2017, Bamford's loan was terminated.)	
18	CF	(France) Loïc Rémy	(England) Crystal Palace	30 August 2016	30 June 2017	
16	LW	(Brazil) Kenedy	(England) Watford	30 August 2016	12 December 2016 (Note: On 12 December 2016, Kenedy's loan spell was terminated.)	
—	CB	(England) Dion Conroy	(England) Aldershot Town	31 August 2016	27 January 2017 (Note: On 27 January 2017, Conroy's loan spell was terminated.)	
—	LM	(Chile) Cristián Cuevas	(Belgium) Sint-Truiden	31 August 2016	30 June 2017	
40	GK	(England) Nathan Baxter	(England) Metropolitan Police	31 August 2016	15 January 2017	
—	CF	(Scotland) Islam Feruz	(Belgium) Mouscron-Péruwelz	31 August 2016	7 January 2017	
—	CB	(Nigeria) Kenneth Omeruo	(Turkey) Alanyaspor	31 August 2016	30 June 2017	
17	RW	(Colombia) Juan Cuadrado	(Italy) Juventus	31 August 2016	30 June 2019 (Note: A £5,000,000 loan fee has been applied to the loan for Juan Cuadrado.)	
—	CB	(England) Jake Clarke-Salter	(England) Bristol Rovers	31 August 2016	30 June 2017	
—	CM	(England) Charlie Colkett	(England) Bristol Rovers	31 August 2016	5 January 2017 (Note: On 5 January 2017, Colkett's loan spell was terminated.)	
—	LW	(Brazil) Lucas Piazon	(England) Fulham	31 August 2016	30 June 2017 (Note: On 17 January 2017, Lucas Piazon's loan at Fulham was extended until the end of the season.)	
—	RW	(Ghana) Christian Atsu	(England) Newcastle United	31 August 2016	30 June 2017	
20	CB	(United States) Matt Miazga	(Netherlands) Vitesse	31 August 2016	30 June 2017	

==== Winter ====
No.	Pos	Player	Loaned to	Start	End	Source
48	LB	(England) Jay Dasilva	(England) Charlton Athletic	1 January 2017	30 June 2017	
27	CM	(Netherlands) Marco van Ginkel	(Netherlands) PSV Eindhoven	2 January 2017	30 June 2017	
—	LW	(England) Isaiah Brown	(England) Huddersfield Town	6 January 2017	30 June 2017	
—	CF	(Colombia) Joao Rodríguez	(Colombia) Cortuluá	6 January 2017	30 June 2017	
—	CM	(England) Charlie Colkett	(England) Swindon Town	11 January 2017	30 June 2017	
43	RB	(England) Fankaty Dabo	(England) Swindon Town	11 January 2017	30 June 2017	
—	CF	(Scotland) Islam Feruz	(England) Swindon Town	11 January 2017	30 June 2017	
40	GK	(England) Nathan Baxter	(England) Solihull Moors	16 January 2017	14 May 2017	
33	CB	(England) Fikayo Tomori	(England) Brighton & Hove Albion	23 January 2017	30 June 2017	
45	DM	(England) Mukhtar Ali	(Netherlands) Vitesse	29 January 2017	30 June 2017	
49	AM	(Switzerland) Miro Muheim	(Switzerland) Zürich	3 February 2017	30 June 2017	

=== Overall transfer activity ===
==== Expenditure ====
Summer: ▼£118,200,000

Winter: ▼£0

Total: ▼£118,200,000

==== Income ====
Summer: ▲£34,400,000

Winter: ▲£66,000,000

Total: ▲£100,400,000

==== Net Totals ====
Summer: ▼£83,800,000

Winter: ▲£66,000,000

Total: ▼£17,800,000

== Pre-season ==
On 13 April 2016, it was announced that Chelsea would visit Austria for two pre-season friendlies against Rapid Wien and Wolfsberger AC. Chelsea concluded their pre-season campaign facing Bundesliga side Werder Bremen in Germany.

16 July 2016 Friendly	Rapid Wien	2–0	Chelsea	Vienna, Austria
17:00 CEST	Joelinton 8'; Tomi 82'	Report		Stadium: Allianz Stadion; Referee: Harald Lechner (Austria)

20 July 2016 Friendly	Wolfsberger AC	0–3	Chelsea	Klagenfurt, Austria
19:00 CEST		Report	Ivanović (yellow card) 39'; Traoré 41'; Loftus-Cheek 84'; Chalobah 90+1'	Stadium: Wörthersee Stadion; Attendance: 7800; Referee: Christian-Petru Ciochirca (Austria)

21 July 2016 Friendly	Atus Ferlach	0–8	Chelsea	Ferlach, Austria
10:00 CEST		Report	Rémy 11', 41', 81'; Mikel 35'; Batshuayi 49', 67'; Pedro 56', 76'	Attendance: 0 (Behind closed doors)

7 August 2016 Friendly	Werder Bremen	2–4	Chelsea	Bremen, Germany
15:00 CEST	Pizarro 33' (pen.); Thy 65'; Fritz (yellow card) 69'	Report	Hazard 7'; Oscar 9'; Matić (yellow card) 32'; Costa 45'; Pedro 90'	Stadium: Weserstadion; Attendance: 23,611; Referee: Sven Jablonski (Germany)

=== International Champions Cup ===
On 22 March 2016, the schedule for the 2016 International Champions Cup was announced that Chelsea would play Liverpool, Real Madrid and Milan.

27 July 2016 ICC	Chelsea	1–0	Liverpool	Pasadena, United States
20:00 PDT	Cahill 10', (yellow card) 24'; Fàbregas (red card) 70'	Report	Moreno (yellow card) 6'; Grujić (yellow card) 12'; Ejaria (yellow card) 39'; Lovren (yellow card) 53'; Stewart (yellow card) 72'	Stadium: Rose Bowl; Attendance: 53,117; Referee: Baldomero Toledo (United States)

30 July 2016 ICC	Real Madrid	3–2	Chelsea	Ann Arbor, United States
15:00 EDT	Marcelo 19', 26'; Mariano 37'; Casemiro (yellow card) 57'; Enzo (yellow card) 78'	Report	Traoré (yellow card) 28'; Pedro (yellow card) 33'; Cahill (yellow card) 42'; Hazard 80', 90+1'	Stadium: Michigan Stadium; Attendance: 105,826; Referee: Younes Marrakchi (United States)

3 August 2016 ICC	Milan	1–3	Chelsea	Minneapolis, United States
20:00 CDT	Romagnoli (yellow card) 5'; Bonaventura 38'; Calabria (yellow card) 64'	Report	Traoré 24'; Oscar 70' (pen.), 87'	Stadium: U.S. Bank Stadium; Attendance: 64,101; Referee: Edvin Jurisevic (United States)

== Competitions ==
=== Premier League ===
==== League table ====
Pos	Team	Pld	W	D	L	GF	GA	GD	Pts	Qualification or relegation
1	Chelsea (C)	38	30	3	5	85	33	+52	93	Qualification for the Champions League group stage
2	Tottenham Hotspur	38	26	8	4	86	26	+60	86	Qualification for the Champions League group stage
3	Manchester City	38	23	9	6	80	39	+41	78	Qualification for the Champions League group stage
4	Liverpool	38	22	10	6	78	42	+36	76	Qualification for the Champions League play-off round
5	Arsenal	38	23	6	9	77	44	+33	75	Qualification for the Europa League group stage (Note: Arsenal qualified for the Europa League group stage by winning the 2016–17 FA Cup. As they had also qualified there by the virtue of their league position (5th), this spot was passed to the next-highest ranked team (6th), Manchester United.)

Source: Premier League
Rules for classification: 1) Points; 2) Goal difference; 3) Goals scored; 4) Play-offs (only if needed to decide champion, teams for relegation or teams for UEFA competitions).
(C) Champions

==== Results by matchday ====
Matchday	1	2	3	4	5	6	7	8	9	10	11	12	13	14	15	16	17	18	19	20	21	22	23	24	25	26	27	28	29	30	31	32	33	34	35	36	37	38
Ground	H	A	H	A	H	A	A	H	H	A	H	A	H	A	H	A	A	H	H	A	A	H	A	H	A	H	A	A	H	H	A	A	H	A	H	A	H	H
Result	W	W	W	D	L	L	W	W	W	W	W	W	W	W	W	W	W	W	W	L	W	W	D	W	D	W	W	W	L	W	W	L	W	W	W	W	W	W
Position	3	4	2	2	3	8	6	5	4	4	2	1	1	1	1	1	1	1	1	1	1	1	1	1	1	1	1	1	1	1	1	1	1	1	1	1	1	1
Points	3	6	9	10	10	10	13	16	19	22	25	28	31	34	37	40	43	46	49	49	52	55	56	59	60	63	66	69	69	72	75	75	78	81	84	87	90	93

Source: Statto
A = Away; H = Home; W = Win; D = Draw; L = Loss

==== Score overview ====
Win Draw Loss

Opposition	Home score	Away score	Aggregate score	Double
Arsenal	3–1	3–0	3–4	No
Bournemouth	3–0	3–1	6–1	Yes
Burnley	3–0	1–1	4–1	No
Crystal Palace	1-2	0-1	2-2	No
Everton	5–0	3–0	8–0	Yes
Hull City	2–0	2–0	4–0	Yes
Leicester City	3–0	3–0	6–0	Yes
Liverpool	1–2	1–1	2–3	No
Manchester City	2–1	3–1	5–2	Yes
Manchester United	4–0	2–0	4–2	No
Middlesbrough	1–0	3–0	4–0	Yes
Southampton	4–2	2–0	6–2	Yes
Stoke City	4–2	2–1	6–3	Yes
Sunderland	5–1	1–0	6–1	Yes
Swansea City	3–1	2–2	5–3	No
Tottenham Hotspur	2–1	2–0	2–3	No
Watford	4–3	2–1	6–4	Yes
West Bromwich Albion	1–0	1–0	2–0	Yes
West Ham United	2–1	2–1	4–2	Yes

==== Matches ====
Win Draw Loss

The fixtures for the 2016–17 season were announced on 15 June 2016 at 9:00 BST.

15 August 2016 1	Chelsea	2–1	West Ham United	Fulham, London
20:00 BST	Kanté (yellow card) 3'; Costa (yellow card) 19', (goal) 89'; Hazard 47' (pen.); Azpilicueta (yellow card) 75'; Matić (yellow card) 90+2'; Pedro (yellow card) 90+3'	Report	Collins (yellow card) 21', (goal) 77'; Antonio (yellow card) 46'	Stadium: Stamford Bridge; Attendance: 41,521; Referee: Anthony Taylor

20 August 2016 2	Watford	1–2	Chelsea	Watford
15:00 BST	Deeney (yellow card) 19'; Capoue 55'; Britos (yellow card) 69'; Holebas (yellow card) 70'	Report	Cahill (yellow card) 20'; Costa (yellow card) 56', (goal) 87'; Batshuayi 80'; Hazard (yellow card) 90+2'	Stadium: Vicarage Road; Attendance: 20,772; Referee: Jonathan Moss

27 August 2016 3	Chelsea	3–0	Burnley	Fulham, London
15:00 BST	Hazard 9'; Oscar (yellow card) 31'; Willian 41'; Ivanović (yellow card) 44'; Moses 89'	Report	Keane (yellow card) 50'; Tarkowski (yellow card) 90'	Stadium: Stamford Bridge; Attendance: 41,607; Referee: Mark Clattenburg

11 September 2016 4	Swansea City	2–2	Chelsea	Swansea
16:00 BST	Fer (yellow card) 26', (goal) 62'; Fernández (yellow card) 42'; Amat (yellow card) 48'; Sigurðsson 59' (pen.)	Report	Costa 18', 81', (yellow card) 40'; Courtois (yellow card) 59'; Hazard (yellow card) 89'; Terry (yellow card) 90+2'	Stadium: Liberty Stadium; Attendance: 20,865; Referee: Andre Marriner

16 September 2016 5	Chelsea	1–2	Liverpool	Fulham, London
20:00 BST	Willian (yellow card) 45+1'; Costa 61'	Report	Lovren 17'; Henderson 36'; Lucas (yellow card) 88'	Stadium: Stamford Bridge; Attendance: 41,514; Referee: Martin Atkinson

24 September 2016 6	Arsenal	3–0	Chelsea	Holloway, London
17:30 BST	Sánchez 11'; Walcott 14'; Özil 40'	Report	Ivanović (yellow card) 28'; Costa (yellow card) 83'	Stadium: Emirates Stadium; Attendance: 60,028; Referee: Michael Oliver

1 October 2016 7	Hull City	0–2	Chelsea	Kingston upon Hull
15:00 BST	Livermore (yellow card) 42'; Robertson (yellow card) 79'	Report	Moses (yellow card) 35'; Matić (yellow card) 41'; Willian 61'; Costa 67'	Stadium: KCOM Stadium; Attendance: 21,257; Referee: Anthony Taylor

15 October 2016 8	Chelsea	3–0	Leicester City	Fulham, London
12:30 BST	Costa 7'; Hazard 33'; Azpilicueta (yellow card) 51'; Moses 80'	Report	Huth (yellow card) 27'	Stadium: Stamford Bridge; Attendance: 41,547; Referee: Andre Marriner

23 October 2016 9	Chelsea	4–0	Manchester United	Fulham, London
16:00 BST	Pedro 1', (yellow card) 1'; Cahill 21'; David Luiz (yellow card) 41'; Hazard 62'; Alonso (yellow card) 66'; Kanté 70'	Report	Bailly (yellow card) 29'; Pogba (yellow card) 75'	Stadium: Stamford Bridge; Attendance: 41,424; Referee: Martin Atkinson

30 October 2016 10	Southampton	0–2	Chelsea	Southampton
16:00 GMT		Report	Hazard 6'; Costa 55'	Stadium: St Mary's Stadium; Attendance: 31,827; Referee: Mike Jones

5 November 2016 11	Chelsea	5–0	Everton	Fulham, London
17:30 GMT	Hazard 19', 56'; Alonso 20'; Costa 42'; Pedro 65'	Report	Bolasie (yellow card) 15'; Jagielka (yellow card) 30'; Barry (yellow card) 64'	Stadium: Stamford Bridge; Attendance: 41,429; Referee: Robert Madley

20 November 2016 12	Middlesbrough	0–1	Chelsea	Middlesbrough
16:00 GMT	Clayton (yellow card) 8'; Chambers (yellow card) 74'	Report	Costa 41'; Azpilicueta (yellow card) 51'; David Luiz (yellow card) 64'; Kanté (yellow card) 73'	Stadium: Riverside Stadium; Attendance: 32,704; Referee: Jonathan Moss

26 November 2016 13	Chelsea	2–1	Tottenham Hotspur	Fulham, London
17:30 GMT	David Luiz (yellow card) 19'; Pedro 45'; Moses 51'; Willian (yellow card) 85'	Report	Eriksen 11'; Dembélé (yellow card) 26'	Stadium: Stamford Bridge; Attendance: 41,513; Referee: Michael Oliver

3 December 2016 14	Manchester City	1–3	Chelsea	Manchester
12:30 GMT	Otamendi (yellow card) 17'; Cahill 45' (o.g.); Navas (yellow card) 81'; Agüero (red card) 90+6'; Fernandinho (red card) 90+7'	Report	Kanté (yellow card) 49'; Costa 60'; Willian 70'; Hazard 90'; Chalobah (yellow card) 90+8'; Fàbregas (yellow card) 90+8'	Stadium: City of Manchester Stadium; Attendance: 54,457; Referee: Anthony Taylor

11 December 2016 15	Chelsea	1–0	West Bromwich Albion	Fulham, London
12:00 GMT	Kanté (yellow card) 48'; Costa 76'; Matić (yellow card) 88'	Report	Brunt (yellow card) 19'; McAuley (yellow card) 29'; Dawson (yellow card) 51'; Yacob (yellow card) 56'	Stadium: Stamford Bridge; Attendance: 41,622; Referee: Mike Dean

14 December 2016 16	Sunderland	0–1	Chelsea	Sunderland
19:45 GMT	Defoe (yellow card) 43'; O'Shea (yellow card) 45+2'; Borini (yellow card) 72'	Report	Fàbregas 40'; Pedro (yellow card) 56'; Moses (yellow card) 90+2'	Stadium: Stadium of Light; Attendance: 41,008; Referee: Neil Swarbrick

17 December 2016 17	Crystal Palace	0–1	Chelsea	Selhurst, London
12:30 GMT	Ward (yellow card) 17'; Delaney (yellow card) 82'	Report	Costa (yellow card) 22', (goal) 43'; Kanté (yellow card) 60'; Fàbregas (yellow card) 90+2'	Stadium: Selhurst Park; Referee: Jonathan Moss

26 December 2016 18	Chelsea	3–0	Bournemouth	Fulham, London
15:00 GMT	Pedro 24', (yellow card) 63'; Hazard 49' (pen.); S. Cook 90+3' (o.g.)	Report	Wilshere (yellow card) 14'	Stadium: Stamford Bridge; Attendance: 41,384; Referee: Mike Jones

31 December 2016 19	Chelsea	4–2	Stoke City	Fulham, London
15:00 GMT	Moses (yellow card) 24'; Cahill 34'; Willian 57', 65'; Fàbregas (yellow card) 59'; Alonso (yellow card) 70'; Costa 85'	Report	Martins Indi 46'; Crouch 64'; Diouf (yellow card) 70'; Adam (yellow card) 86'	Stadium: Stamford Bridge; Attendance: 41,601; Referee: Bobby Madley

4 January 2017 20	Tottenham Hotspur	2–0	Chelsea	Tottenham, London
20:00 GMT	Wanyama (yellow card) 40'; Alli 45+1', 54', (yellow card) 45+2'; Rose (yellow card) 87'	Report	Pedro (yellow card) 18'; Cahill (yellow card) 38'	Stadium: White Hart Lane; Attendance: 31,491; Referee: Martin Atkinson

14 January 2017 21	Leicester City	0–3	Chelsea	Leicester
17:30 GMT	Fuchs (yellow card) 51'	Report	Alonso 6', 51'; Pedro 71'	Stadium: King Power Stadium; Attendance: 32,066; Referee: Andre Marriner

22 January 2017 22	Chelsea	2–0	Hull City	Fulham, London
16:30 GMT	Kanté (yellow card) 43'; Costa 45+7'; Cahill 81'	Report	Dawson (yellow card) 7'; Davies (yellow card) 26'; Robertson (yellow card) 52'	Stadium: Stamford Bridge; Attendance: 41,605; Referee: Neil Swarbrick

31 January 2017 23	Liverpool	1–1	Chelsea	Liverpool
20:00 GMT	Henderson (yellow card) 45'; Wijnaldum 57'; Milner (yellow card) 59'	Report	David Luiz 24'; Costa (penalty missed) 77'; Willian (yellow card) 79'	Stadium: Anfield; Attendance: 53,157; Referee: Mark Clattenburg

4 February 2017 24	Chelsea	3–1	Arsenal	Fulham, London
12:30 GMT	Alonso 13'; Hazard 53'; Matić (yellow card) 70'; Fàbregas 85'	Report	Mustafi (yellow card) 23'; Giroud 90+1'	Stadium: Stamford Bridge; Attendance: 41,490; Referee: Martin Atkinson

12 February 2017 25	Burnley	1–1	Chelsea	Burnley
13:30 GMT	Brady 24'; Westwood (yellow card) 69'; Lowton (yellow card) 77'; Barton (yellow card) 88'	Report	Pedro 7'; David Luiz (yellow card) 75'; Fàbregas (yellow card) 89'	Stadium: Turf Moor; Attendance: 21,744; Referee: Kevin Friend

25 February 2017 26	Chelsea	3–1	Swansea City	Fulham, London
15:00 GMT	Fàbregas 19'; Pedro 72'; David Luiz (yellow card) 75'; Costa 84'	Report	Naughton (yellow card) 35'; Olsson (yellow card) 36'; Llorente 45+2'; Fer (yellow card) 80'	Stadium: Stamford Bridge; Attendance: 41,612; Referee: Neil Swarbrick

6 March 2017 27	West Ham United	1–2	Chelsea	Stratford, London
20:00 GMT	Lanzini 90+2'	Report	Hazard 25'; Fàbregas (yellow card) 45+2'; Costa 50'	Stadium: Olympic Stadium; Attendance: 56,984; Referee: Andre Marriner

18 March 2017 28	Stoke City	1–2	Chelsea	Stoke-on-Trent
15:00 GMT	Allen (yellow card) 15'; Walters 38' (pen.); Bardsley (yellow card) 40' (yellow-red card) 90+5'; Pieters (yellow card) 65'; Martins Indi (yellow card) 65'; Cameron (yellow card) 90+1'	Report	Willian 13'; Costa (yellow card) 17'; Cahill 87'; Fàbregas (yellow card) 90+4'	Stadium: bet365 Stadium; Attendance: 27,724; Referee: Anthony Taylor

1 April 2017 29	Chelsea	1–2	Crystal Palace	Fulham, London
15:00 BST	Fàbregas 5'; Costa (yellow card) 50'; Cahill (yellow card) 79'; David Luiz (yellow card) 83'	Report	Zaha 9'; Benteke 11', (yellow card) 68'; Milivojević (yellow card) 73'	Stadium: Stamford Bridge; Attendance: 41,489; Referee: Craig Pawson

5 April 2017 30	Chelsea	2–1	Manchester City	Fulham, London
20:00 BST	Hazard 10', (penalty missed) 35', 35'; Kanté (yellow card) 90+3'	Report	Agüero 26'; Clichy (yellow card) 52'; Delph (yellow card) 77'; Kompany (yellow card) 83'	Stadium: Stamford Bridge; Attendance: 41,528; Referee: Mike Dean

8 April 2017 31	Bournemouth	1–3	Chelsea	Bournemouth
17:30 BST	Arter (yellow card) 38'; King 42'; Gradel (yellow card) 90+1'	Report	Moses (yellow card) 8'; Smith 17' (o.g.); Hazard 20'; Kanté (yellow card) 58'; Alonso 68'; Pedro (yellow card) 74'	Stadium: Dean Court; Attendance: 11,283; Referee: Andre Marriner

16 April 2017 32	Manchester United	2–0	Chelsea	Manchester
16:00 BST	Rashford 7'; Herrera 49'; Rojo (yellow card) 75'; Ibrahimović (yellow card) 90'	Report	Costa (yellow card) 33'; Cahill (yellow card) 48'; Fàbregas (yellow card) 90'	Stadium: Old Trafford; Attendance: 75,272; Referee: Robert Madley

25 April 2017 33	Chelsea	4–2	Southampton	Fulham, London
19:45 BST	Hazard 5'; Kanté (yellow card) 40'; Cahill 45+1'; Fàbregas (yellow card) 49'; Costa 54', 89'	Report	Romeu 24', (yellow card) 60'; Tadić (yellow card) 73'; Bertrand 90+4'	Stadium: Stamford Bridge; Attendance: 41,168; Referee: Lee Mason

30 April 2017 34	Everton	0–3	Chelsea	Liverpool
14:05 BST	Baines (yellow card) 38'; Valencia (yellow card) 58'; Gueye (yellow card) 78'	Report	Cahill (yellow card) 35', (goal) 79'; Azpilicueta (yellow card) 40'; Costa (yellow card) 56'; Pedro 66'; Matić (yellow card) 75'; Willian 86'	Stadium: Goodison Park; Attendance: 39,595; Referee: Jonathan Moss

8 May 2017 35	Chelsea	3–0	Middlesbrough	Fulham, London
20:00 BST	Costa 23'; Alonso 34'; Matić 65'	Report	Fábio (yellow card) 60'; Bamford (yellow card) 89'	Stadium: Stamford Bridge; Attendance: 41,500; Referee: Craig Pawson

12 May 2017 36	West Bromwich Albion	0–1	Chelsea	West Bromwich
20:00 BST	McClean (yellow card) 20'; Field (yellow card) 36'; Wilson (yellow card) 71'	Report	Batshuayi 82'	Stadium: The Hawthorns; Attendance: 25,367; Referee: Michael Oliver

15 May 2017 37	Chelsea	4–3	Watford	Fulham, London
20:00 BST	Terry 22'; Aké (yellow card) 30'; Azpilicueta 36'; Batshuayi 49'; Chalobah (yellow card) 58'; Fàbregas 88'	Report	Holebas (yellow card) 4'; Amrabat (yellow card) 11'; Capoue 24'; Janmaat 51'; Okaka 74', (yellow card) 90+4'; Prödl (yellow card) 83' (yellow-red card) 90+2'; Deeney (yellow card) 90+4'	Stadium: Stamford Bridge; Attendance: 41,473; Referee: Lee Mason

21 May 2017 38	Chelsea	5–1	Sunderland	Fulham, London
15:00 BST	Willian 8'; Costa (yellow card) 39'; Hazard 61'; Pedro 77'; Batshuayi 90', 90+2'	Report	Manquillo 3'; Jones (yellow card) 48'	Stadium: Stamford Bridge; Attendance: 41,618; Referee: Neil Swarbrick

=== FA Cup ===
Win Draw Loss

8 January 2017 Third round	Chelsea	4–1	Peterborough United	Fulham, London
15:00 GMT	Pedro 18', 75'; Fàbregas (yellow card) 24'; Batshuayi 43'; Willian 52'; Terry (red card) 67'	Report	Forrester (yellow card) 23'; Tafazolli (yellow card) 33'; Nichols 70'	Stadium: Stamford Bridge; Attendance: 41,003; Referee: Kevin Friend

28 January 2017 Fourth round	Chelsea	4–0	Brentford	Fulham, London
15:00 GMT	Willian 14'; Pedro 21'; Ivanović 69'; Batshuayi 81' (pen.); Chalobah (yellow card) 89'	Report	Colin (yellow card) 55'	Stadium: Stamford Bridge; Attendance: 41,042; Referee: Michael Oliver

18 February 2017 Fifth round	Wolverhampton Wanderers	0–2	Chelsea	Wolverhampton
17:30 GMT	Saville (yellow card) 21'; Weimann (yellow card) 33'	Report	Pedro (yellow card) 49', (goal) 65'; Costa 89'	Stadium: Molineux; Attendance: 30,193; Referee: Jonathan Moss

13 March 2017 Quarter-final	Chelsea	1–0	Manchester United	Fulham, London
19:45 GMT	Kanté 51'; Costa (yellow card) 87'	Report	Herrera (yellow card) 20' (yellow-red card) 35'; Young (yellow card) 79'	Stadium: Stamford Bridge; Attendance: 40,801; Referee: Michael Oliver

22 April 2017 Semi-final	Chelsea	4–2	Tottenham Hotspur	Wembley, London
17:15 BST	Willian 5', 43' (pen.); Alonso (yellow card) 45+3'; Hazard 75'; Matić 80'; Kanté (yellow card) 90+3'	Report	Alderweireld (yellow card) 4'; Kane 18'; Alli 52', (yellow card) 73'	Stadium: Wembley Stadium; Attendance: 86,355; Referee: Martin Atkinson

27 May 2017 Final	Arsenal	2–1	Chelsea	Wembley, London
17:30 BST	Sánchez 4'; Ramsey (yellow card) 9', (goal) 79'; Holding (yellow card) 54'; Xhaka (yellow card) 81'; Coquelin (yellow card) 83'	Report	Moses (yellow card) 57' (yellow-red card) 68'; Kanté (yellow card) 59'; Costa 76'	Stadium: Wembley Stadium; Attendance: 89,472; Referee: Anthony Taylor

=== EFL Cup ===
Win Draw Loss

23 August 2016 Second round	Chelsea	3–2	Bristol Rovers	Fulham, London
19:45 BST	Batshuayi 29', 41'; Moses 31'; Pedro (yellow card) 48'	Report	Hartley 35'; Harrison 48' (pen.); Easter (yellow card) 71'; Taylor (yellow card) 86'	Stadium: Stamford Bridge; Attendance: 39,266; Referee: Keith Stroud

20 September 2016 Third round	Leicester City	2–4 (a.e.t.)	Chelsea	Leicester
19:45 BST	Okazaki 17', 34'; Wasilewski (yellow card) 52' (yellow-red card) 89'; Drinkwater (yellow card) 87'; Chilwell (yellow card) 103'	Report	Cahill 45+2'; Azpilicueta 49'; Matić (yellow card) 83'; Fàbregas 92', 94'; David Luiz (yellow card) 109'	Stadium: King Power Stadium; Attendance: 29,899; Referee: Robert Madley

26 October 2016 Fourth round	West Ham United	2–1	Chelsea	Stratford, London
19:45 BST	Kouyaté 11', (yellow card) 90+4'; Fernandes 48'; Noble (yellow card) 64'; Reid (yellow card) 76'	Report	Cahill 90+4'	Stadium: Olympic Stadium; Attendance: 45,957; Referee: Craig Pawson

== Statistics ==
=== Appearances ===
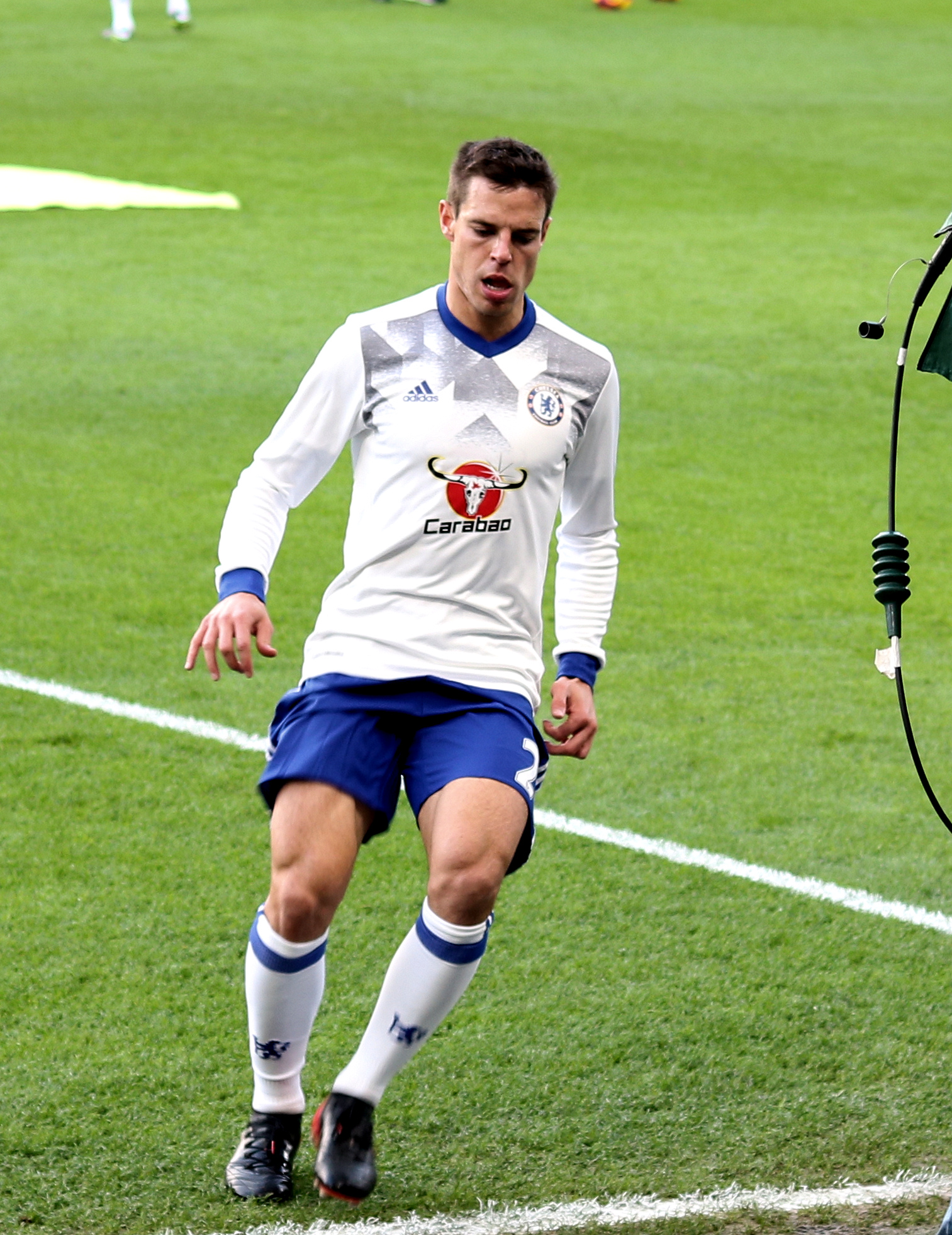
César Azpilicueta featured in the team's all 47 games during the season, more than any other Chelsea player.

No.	Pos.	Name	Premier League		FA Cup		EFL Cup		Total		Discipline	
No.	Pos.	Name	Apps	Goals	Apps	Goals	Apps	Goals	Apps	Goals	Yellow card	Red card
1	GK	(Bosnia and Herzegovina) Asmir Begović	2	0	3	0	3	0	8	0	0	0
3	DF	(Spain) Marcos Alonso	30 (1)	6	3	0	1	0	34 (1)	6	3	0
4	MF	(Spain) Cesc Fàbregas	13 (15)	5	3 (3)	0	2	2	18 (18)	7	8	0
5	DF	(France) Kurt Zouma	2 (6)	0	3 (1)	0	0	0	5 (7)	0	0	0
6	MF	(Netherlands) Nathan Aké	1 (1)	0	3	0	0	0	4 (1)	0	1	0
7	MF	(France) N'Golo Kanté	34	1	3 (2)	1	1	0	38 (2)	2	11	0
10	MF	(Belgium) Eden Hazard	35	16	4	1	0 (3)	0	39 (3)	17	3	0
11	MF	(Spain) Pedro	25 (9)	9	5	4	2 (1)	0	32 (10)	13	8	0
13	GK	(Belgium) Thibaut Courtois	36	0	3	0	0	0	39	0	1	0
14	MF	(England) Ruben Loftus-Cheek	0 (5)	0	2 (1)	0	2	0	4 (6)	0	0	0
15	MF	(Nigeria) Victor Moses	29 (5)	3	4	0	2	1	35 (5)	4	5	1
16	MF	(Brazil) Kenedy	1	0	0 (1)	0	0	0	1 (1)	0	0	0
19	FW	(Spain) Diego Costa	34	20	3 (2)	2	0 (2)	0	37 (4)	22	11	0
21	MF	(Serbia) Nemanja Matić	29 (5)	1	3	1	2	0	34 (5)	2	5	0
22	MF	(Brazil) Willian	15 (18)	8	5 (1)	4	1	0	21 (19)	12	3	0
23	FW	(Belgium) Michy Batshuayi	1 (19)	5	3 (2)	2	3	2	7 (21)	9	0	0
24	DF	(England) Gary Cahill	35 (1)	6	3	0	3	2	41 (1)	8	4	0
26	DF	(England) John Terry	6 (3)	1	3	0	1 (1)	0	10 (4)	1	1	1
28	DF	(Spain) César Azpilicueta	38	1	4 (2)	0	3	1	45 (2)	2	4	0
29	MF	(England) Nathaniel Chalobah	1 (9)	0	3	0	1 (1)	0	5 (10)	0	3	0
30	DF	(Brazil) David Luiz	33	1	3	0	2	0	38	1	7	0
34	DF	(England) Ola Aina	0 (3)	0	0 (1)	0	2	0	2 (4)	0	0	0
35	MF	(Belgium) Charly Musonda	0	0	0	0	0	0	0	0	0	0
37	GK	(Portugal) Eduardo	0	0	0	0	0	0	0	0	0	0
41	FW	(England) Dominic Solanke	0	0	0	0	0	0	0	0	0	0
Players who were transferred or loaned out during the season
2	DF	(Serbia) Branislav Ivanović	6 (7)	0	1 (1)	1	1	0	8 (8)	1	2	0
8	MF	(Brazil) Oscar	5 (4)	0	0	0	1 (1)	0	6 (5)	0	1	0
12	MF	(Nigeria) Mikel John Obi	0	0	0	0	0	0	0	0	0	0

Source: Chelsea F.C.

=== Top scorers ===
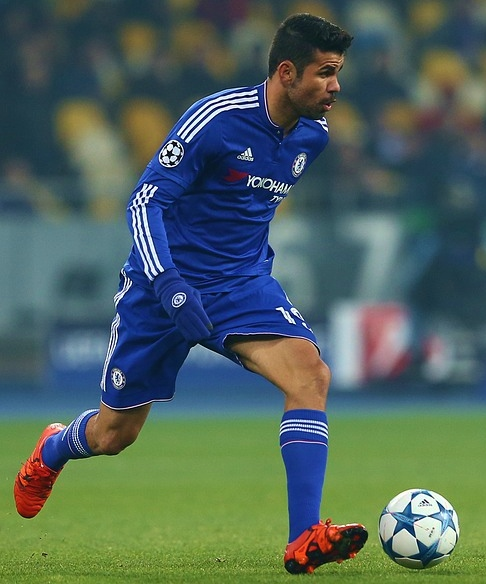
Diego Costa was Chelsea's top scorer with 22 goals, 20 of which were league goals.

The list is sorted by shirt number when total goals are equal.

Rank	Pos.	No.	Player	Premier League	FA Cup	EFL Cup	Total
1	FW	19	(Spain) Diego Costa	20	2	0	22
2	MF	10	(Belgium) Eden Hazard	16	1	0	17
3	MF	11	(Spain) Pedro	9	4	0	13
4	MF	22	(Brazil) Willian	8	4	0	12
5	FW	23	(Belgium) Michy Batshuayi	5	2	2	9
6	DF	24	(England) Gary Cahill	6	0	2	8
7	MF	4	(Spain) Cesc Fàbregas	5	0	2	7
8	DF	3	(Spain) Marcos Alonso	6	0	0	6
9	MF	15	(Nigeria) Victor Moses	3	0	1	4
10	MF	7	(France) N'Golo Kanté	1	1	0	2
10	MF	21	(Serbia) Nemanja Matić	1	1	0	2
10	DF	28	(Spain) César Azpilicueta	1	0	1	2
13	DF	2	(Serbia) Branislav Ivanović	0	1	0	1
13	DF	26	(England) John Terry	1	0	0	1
13	DF	30	(Brazil) David Luiz	1	0	0	1
Own goals				2	0	0	2
Total				85	16	8	109

Last updated: 27 May 2017.
Source: Chelsea F.C.

=== Clean sheets ===
The list is sorted by shirt number when total clean sheets are equal.

Rnk	No.	Player	Premier League	FA Cup	EFL Cup	Total
1	13	(Belgium) Thibaut Courtois	16	1	0	17
2	1	(Bosnia and Herzegovina) Asmir Begović	0	2	0	2
Total			16	3	0	19

Last updated: 12 May 2017.
Source: Chelsea F.C.

=== Summary ===
Games played	47 (38 Premier League) (6 FA Cup) (3 EFL Cup)
Games won	37 (30 Premier League) (5 FA Cup) (2 EFL Cup)
Games drawn	3 (3 Premier League) (1 FA Cup)
Games lost	7 (5 Premier League) (1 EFL Cup) (1 FA Cup)
Goals scored	109 (85 Premier League) (16 FA Cup) (8 EFL Cup)
Goals conceded	44 (33 Premier League) (5 FA Cup) (6 EFL Cup)
Goal difference	+65 (+52 Premier League) (+11 FA Cup) (+2 EFL Cup)
Clean sheets	19 (16 Premier League) (3 FA Cup)
Yellow cards	74 (65 Premier League) (6 FA Cup) (3 EFL Cup)
Red cards	1 (1 FA Cup)
Most appearances	(Spain) César Azpilicueta (46 Appearances)
Top scorer	(Spain) Diego Costa (21 goals)
Winning percentage	78.7% (37/47)

Last updated: 21 May 2017.
Source: Chelsea F.C.

== Awards ==
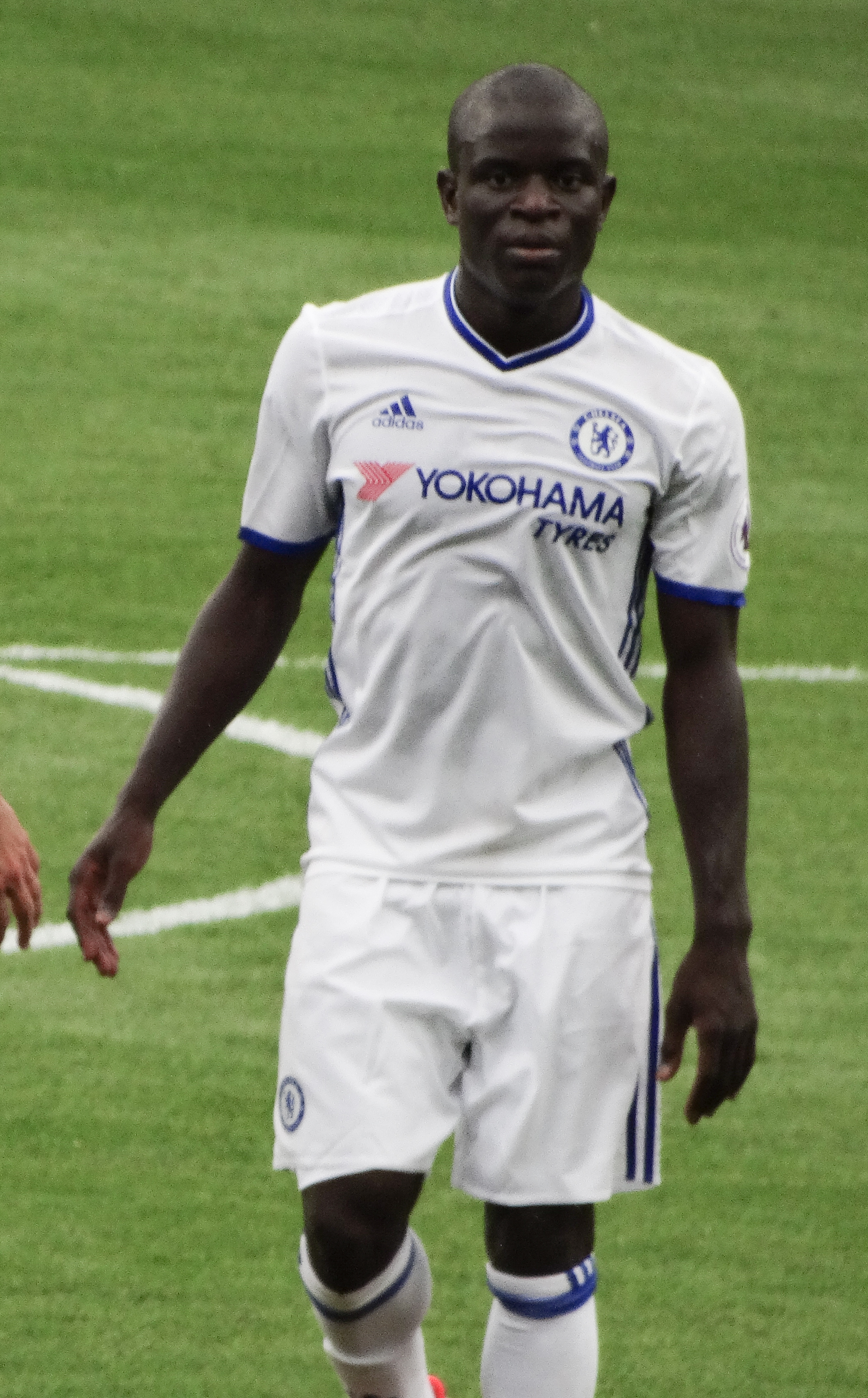
As well as attaining back-to-back league titles, Kanté won the PFA Players' Player of the Year, FWA Footballer of the Year and Premier League Player of the Season awards.

=== Player ===
No.	Player	Award	Month	Source
10	(Belgium) Eden Hazard	Premier League Player of the Month	October	
10	(Belgium) Eden Hazard	PFA Fans' Premier League Player of the Month	October	
19	(Spain) Diego Costa	Premier League Player of the Month	November	
11	(Spain) Pedro	Premier League Goal of the Month	November	
15	(Nigeria) Victor Moses	PFA Fans' Premier League Player of the Month	November	
10	(Belgium) Eden Hazard	Premier League Goal of the Month	February	
7	(France) N'Golo Kante	London Football Awards Premier League Player of the Year	March	
7	(France) N'Golo Kante	PFA Fans' Premier League Player of the Month	March	
7	(France) N'Golo Kante	PFA Players' Player of the Year	April	
11	(Spain) Pedro	Premier League Goal of the Month	April	
7	(France) N'Golo Kante	FWA Footballer of the Year	May	
7	(France) N'Golo Kante	Premier League Player of the Season	May	
7	(France) N'Golo Kante	Chelsea Players' Player of the Year	May	
10	(Belgium) Eden Hazard	Chelsea Player of the Year	May	
10	(Belgium) Eden Hazard	Chelsea Goal of the Year	May	
10	(Belgium) Thibaut Courtois	Premier League Golden Glove	May	

=== Manager ===
Manager	Award	Month	Source
(Italy) Antonio Conte	Premier League Manager of the Month	October	
(Italy) Antonio Conte	Premier League Manager of the Month	November	
(Italy) Antonio Conte	Premier League Manager of the Month	December	
(Italy) Antonio Conte	London Football Awards Manager of the Year	March	
(Italy) Antonio Conte	LMA Manager of the Year	May	
(Italy) Antonio Conte	Premier League Manager of the Season	May	
