= Gianluca Spinelli =

Italian football coach

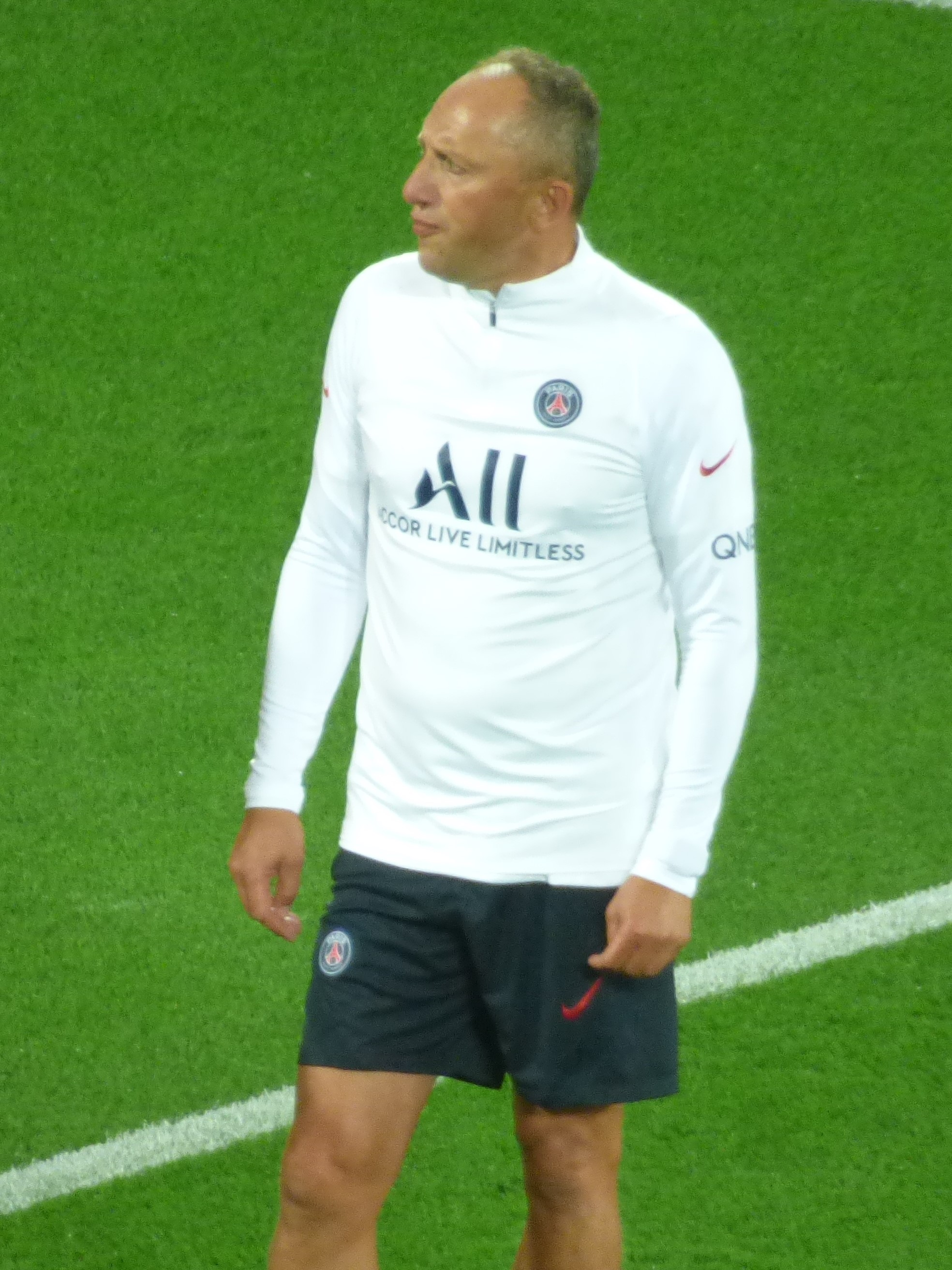
- Spinelli in 2020

Personal information
- Date of birth: 29 October 1966 (age 60)
- Place of birth: Milan, Italy
- Height: 1.83 m (6 ft 0 in)

Team information
- Current team: Italy and Inter Milan (goalkeeping coach)

Managerial career
- Years: Team
- 2002–2004: Como (goalkeeping coach)
- 2004–2014: Genoa (goalkeeping coach)
- 2014–2016: Italy and Genoa (goalkeeping coach)
- 2016–2018: Italy and Chelsea (goalkeeping coach)
- 2018–2023: Italy and PSG (goalkeeping coach)
- 2023–: Italy and Inter Milan (goalkeeping coach)

Gianluca Spinelli (born 29 October 1966) is an Italian professional football goalkeeper coach. He is a goalkeeper coach for Italian club Inter Milan and the Italy national football team.

== Coaching career ==
Spinelli began his career as a goalkeeper coach at local team Como in 2002; as a player, he had previously served as a reserve goalkeeper for the club behind Alex Brunner, and helped the team achieve promotion to Serie A in 2002, starting in his side's decisive 2–0 home win over Empoli at the Stadio Giuseppe Sinigaglia, and keeping a clean sheet.

After spending two years with the Lariani, he was picked up by Serie A team Genoa He spent 12 years at Genoa, serving under 16 managers, and coaching several goalkeepers (in particular Mattia Perin), and helping lead the club out of the Serie C, (Now Lega Pro) to the top flight; during his time with the club, he earned a reputation as one of the best goalkeeping coaches in Italy.

In 2014, Spinelli joined manager Antonio Conte as part of the coaching staff of the Italy national football team, maintaining the dual role of goalkeeping coach for both Genoa and Italy. After Italy's 6–5 penalty shootout loss to Germany in the Euro 2016 quarter-finals, Spinelli followed Conte to English club Chelsea. He held the dual role of goalkeeping coach for both the Italy national football team and Chelsea. During the 2016–17 Premier League season, Chelsea's starting goalkeeper Thibaut Courtois praised Spinelli's abilities as a goalkeeping coach, and has credited Spinelli for helping him to improve his overall game and technique, in particular his foot-work and diving, which enabled him to be more explosive and get to ground more quickly. Chelsea finished the season as Premier League Champions. The following season, Chelsea won the FA Cup.

After Antonio Conte was sacked by Chelsea in July 2018, Spinelli joined Paris Saint-Germain as the team's new goalkeeping coach, where he was re-united with former Italy goalkeeper Gianluigi Buffon. He continued to hold a dual role as both Paris Saint-Germain's goalkeeping coach, and the goalkeeping coach of the Italy national team, under manager Roberto Mancini.

== Honours ==
=== Goalkeeping coach ===
Genoa

- Serie B: 2006–07 (Promoted)
- Serie C1: 2005–06 (Runner-up)

Chelsea

- Premier League: 2016–17
- FA Cup: 2017–18

Paris Saint-Germain

- Ligue 1: 2018–19
- Trophée des Champions: 2018, 2019

Inter Milan

- Serie A: 2025–26
- Coppa Italia: 2025–26

Individual

- Serie A Goalkeeping coach of the Year: 2011–12, 2014–15, 2015–16
