= Gianluca Conte =

Italian football coach (born 1972)

Personal information
- Date of birth: 28 May 1972 (age 54)
- Place of birth: Lecce, Italy

Senior career*
Years	Team	Apps	(Gls)
1985–1993	Lecce	9	(0)

Managerial career
- 2007–2009: Bari (assistant)
- 2010–2011: Siena (assistant)
- 2011–2014: Juventus (assistant)
- 2014–2016: Italy (assistant)
- 2016–2018: Chelsea (assistant)
- 2019–2021: Inter Milan (assistant)
- 2021–2023: Tottenham Hotspur (assistant)
- 2024–2026: Napoli (assistant)
- * Club domestic league appearances and goals

Gianluca Conte (Italian pronunciation: [dʒanˈluːka ˈkonte]; born 28 May 1972) is an Italian professional football coach, analyst and former player and brother of Antonio Conte.

Playing as a defender, Conte began his career at local club Lecce. Conte played from the bench and did not manage to break into the first team. Later he studied the University of Foggia, in sport science, and followed his brother Antonio into a managerial role. His managerial career started in 2007, assisting his brother to lead Bari to the 2008–09 Serie B title, and Siena to promotion from the same division two years later. He then arrived at Juventus in 2011. Winning three consecutive Serie A titles as an assistant manager, he then followed his brother again in taking charge of the Italy national team in 2014 until the UEFA Euro 2016 campaign.

== Club career ==
Conte began his career with the youth team of his hometown club Lecce. Conte made nine appearances for the Salentini in their maiden campaign in the Serie A. Failing to crack the first team, Conte finished his career to pursue a sport science degree.

== Honours ==
=== Assistant manager ===
Bari

- Serie B: 2008–09

Juventus

- Serie A: 2011–12, 2012–13, 2013–14
- Supercoppa Italiana: 2012, 2013

Chelsea

- Premier League: 2016–17
- FA Cup: 2017–18

Inter Milan

- Serie A: 2020–21

Napoli

- Serie A: 2024–25
