= Josh Yorwerth =

Welsh footballer (born 1995)

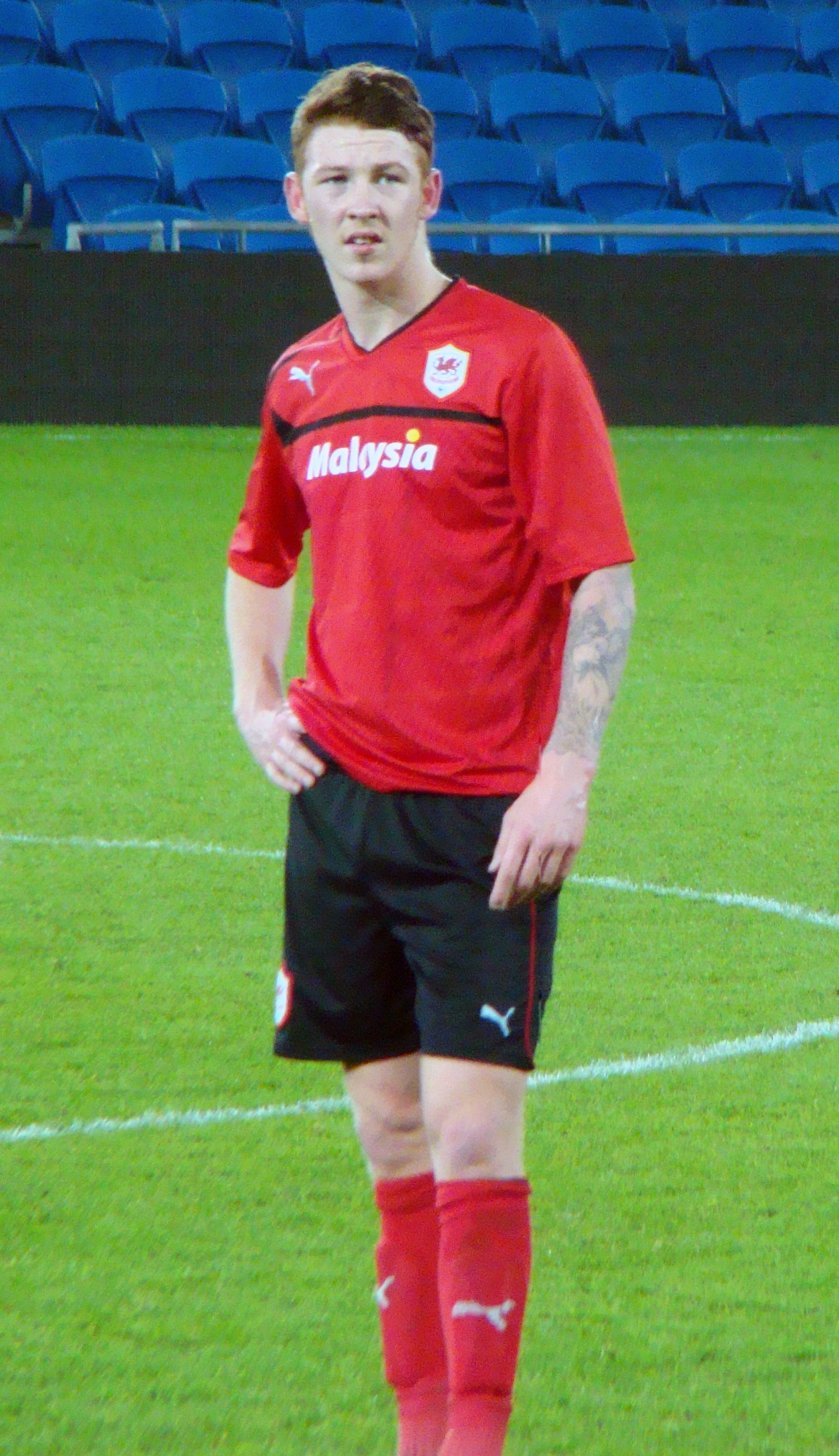
- Yorwerth playing for Cardiff City's development squad in 2013

Personal information
- Full name: Joshua Yorwerth
- Date of birth: 28 February 1995 (age 31)
- Place of birth: Bridgend, Wales
- Height: 1.85 m (6 ft 1 in)
- Position: Defender

Team information
- Current team: Bettws

Youth career
- 2008–2015: Cardiff City

Senior career*
Years	Team	Apps	(Gls)
2014–2015	Cardiff City	0	(0)
2014	→ Hereford United (loan)	0	(0 (Note: Hereford's records for the season were expunged following liquidation of the club meaning Yorwerth's official stats for the loan period were wiped out.))
2015–2016	Ipswich Town	3	(1)
2015–2016	→ Crawley Town (loan)	24	(0)
2016–2018	Crawley Town	60	(4)
2016	→ Merthyr Town (loan)	6	(2)
2018–2019	Peterborough United	2	(0)
2022–2024	Penybont	19	(2)
2024	Merthyr Town	0	(0)
2024–2025	Barry Town United	28	(1)
2025–2026	Llanelli Town		
2026–	Bettws		

International career^{‡}
- Wales U16
2010–2011	Wales U17	5	(0)
2013–2014	Wales U19	7	(1)
2015–2016	Wales U21	7	(1)
- * Club domestic league appearances and goals as of 04:15, 29 September 2025 (UTC) ‡ National team caps and goals as of 21:59, 29 March 2016 (UTC)

Joshua Yorwerth (born 28 February 1995) is a Welsh professional footballer who plays for Bettws. He is a former Wales under-21 international.

Yorwerth began his career as a youth player with Cardiff City, joining the club at the age of 13. He spent time on loan with Hereford United during the club's final months before folding due to financial problems. In 2015, he signed for Ipswich Town where he made his professional debut in the EFL Cup.

After spending several months on loan with Crawley Town, he joined the club on a permanent basis in 2016. He spent time on loan with Merthyr Town before establishing himself in the first team, making 91 appearances in all competitions. He joined Peterborough United in 2018 but was sacked by the club eight months later after evading an anti-doping test and admitting to cocaine use. He received a four-year ban from The Football Association in February 2019, the longest doping-related ban ever sanctioned in English professional football. At international level, he has represented Wales at several youth levels.

== Early life ==
Yorwerth was born in Bridgend, Wales, and grew up in the nearby village of Brynmenyn. As a youngster he played youth football for local sides in Aberkenfig, where he was coached by his father Robert, and Pencoed and was a fan of Manchester United. He attended Ynysawdre Comprehensive School. He also represented Wales at youth level in rugby union.

== Club career ==
=== Early career ===
Yorwerth was a member of the Cardiff City F.C. Academy, signing scholarship forms in 2008 at the age of 13. He progressed up to the under-21 development side in 2014 but, unable to break into the first team, he sought a loan move to gain experience. Yorwerth later admitted that he struggled to find a club willing to take him on loan, commenting "My agent couldn't find me anything and it's quite hard to get loan moves for youngsters who haven't got any experience or not played any games." He eventually joined Southern Football League side Hereford United on loan in November 2014, scoring on his debut in a 3–1 win over Frome Town. However the following month Hereford were forced into liquidation due to financial difficulties and they were removed from the league with their records for the season expunged. With four experienced centre-backs in the squad and competition from other youngsters Ben Nugent and Adedeji Oshilaja, Yorwerth found first team chances non-existent on his return to Cardiff and was not offered an extension to his contract in order to seek regular football elsewhere. He later revealed that he had suffered from a gambling addiction during his time with Cardiff.

After appearing in two under-21 fixtures for the club during a trial period, Yorwerth joined fellow Championship side Ipswich Town on a two-year contract, with the option of a third, in 2015. He made his professional debut for Ipswich in an EFL Cup match against Stevenage on 11 August 2015, and scored in the 55th minute. The goal equalised for Ipswich, who went on to win 2–1. He played in the following two rounds of the competition, featuring in a 4–1 victory over Doncaster Rovers and a 3–0 defeat to Manchester United.

=== Crawley Town ===
Yorwerth joined League Two club Crawley Town on a one-month loan on 29 September 2015 and made his Football League debut against Newport County in a 3–0 win the same day. He made five appearances during the month and his loan spell was extended until 29 December 2015. In April 2016, Ipswich manager Mick McCarthy announced that Yorwerth would leave the club at the end of the season, with the club and player agreeing to a mutual termination of his contract a month later.

On 1 June 2016, Yorwerth rejoined Crawley on a permanent basis on a one-year deal. He made his first appearance of the season as a substitute in place of Jason Banton during a 1–1 draw with Doncaster Rovers on 13 August. Three days later, he again appeared as a late substitute and scored the only goal of the game in a victory over Exeter City. However, Yorwerth was given leave by the club to return home for "personal reasons" in October 2016.

Having returned to Wales, Yorwerth joined local side Merthyr Town on a 28-day loan. Three days later, Yorwerth made his debut in a 2–0 home victory over Dorchester Town. In the following fixture, Yorwerth scored the equaliser in a 1–1 draw against Slough Town. On 4 November 2016, after impressing with the Welsh side, Yorwerth's loan at Merthyr Town was extended until 4 January 2017. However, days after his loan extension, Crawley decided to recall Yorwerth, after injuries to Mark Connolly and Joe McNerney. Following his return, Crawley manager Dermot Drummy credited the loan spell with an improvement in Yorwerth's form.

On 30 May 2017, Yorwerth signed a new one-year deal at Crawley with an option of an extra year. Under Drummy's replacement Harry Kewell, Yorwerth continued as a first team regular. However, he later admitted to clashing with the manager on several occasions over his drinking, and was even dropped on occasion after arriving at training sessions smelling of alcohol. Despite this, Yorwerth excelled for Crawley, stating his belief that he "had a brilliant season." He made 43 appearances for Crawley during the 2017–18 season, scoring once.

=== Peterborough United ===
On 6 July 2018, Yorwerth joined League One side Peterborough United on a three-year deal. Although the sum was undisclosed, it was reported to be a "six-figure fee." He made his debut for the club as a substitute in place of Matt Godden during a 4–1 victory over Rochdale in Peterborough's second game of the season. One month later, he made his first start in a 3–3 draw with Milton Keynes Dons in the EFL Trophy. He made one further appearance for the club in a 4–2 victory over Gillingham on 22 September.

In September 2018, officials visited Yorwerth's home in order to carry out routine random drug tests. In the days prior to the visit he had taken cocaine and, fearing a positive test, he refused to answer the door to testers. Yorwerth feared failing the test would result in an automatic two-year ban, however the offence actually carried a maximum three-month sentence. His understanding of the rules related to the offence were later described as "flimsy" by members of The Football Association (FA) panel during his hearing.

In December 2018, he was charged by the FA with an anti-doping violation. The FA claimed Yorwerth "evaded sample collection or, without compelling justification, refused or failed to submit to sample collection following notification by an anti-doping official." On 26 February 2019, Yorwerth's contract was terminated after he was issued a four-year ban for both evading an anti-doping test and taking cocaine. Yorwerth later admitted to attending the hearing having "slept for one hour, was stinking of booze and [...] used cocaine the night before." The ban is believed to be the longest in the history of English professional football for an anti-doping offence. He subsequently entered rehab, began counselling sessions and planned to appeal the ban on mental health grounds.

=== Return to football ===
Upon the expiration of his ban, Yorwerth joined his hometown club, Cymru Premier side Penybont. In his first season with the club, he made the Cymru Premier Team of the Year. On 31 January 2024 Josh re-signed for Merthyr Town of the Southern League Premier South.

In August 2024 he joined Barry Town United.

In June 2026 he moved to Bettws, in the sixth tier of Welsh football.

== International career ==
Yorwerth has captained Wales at under-16 level and has also played for the under-17, under-19 and under-21 sides. He scored on his debut for Wales under-21s in a 3–1 victory over Bulgaria.

== Style of play ==
Yorwerth has been described as "an attacking defender", frequently looking to move forward with the ball out of defence, and possesses above average pace for a defender. Yorwerth himself has stated "I prefer the physical side of things, no-one is going to beat me on the physical side and I think my rugby background helps." Geraint Williams, who coached Yorwerth for the Wales under-21 side has described him as "comfortable on the ball" but added "his primary concern should be concentrating on his defending."

== Career statistics ==
As of match played 22 September 2018

Appearances and goals by club, season and competition
Club	Season	League			FA Cup		EFL Cup		Other		Total	
Club	Season	Division	Apps	Goals	Apps	Goals	Apps	Goals	Apps	Goals	Apps	Goals
Ipswich Town	2015–16	Championship	0	0	0	0	3	1	—		3	1
Crawley Town (loan)	2015–16	League Two	24	0	1	0	0	0	0	0	25	0
Crawley Town	2016–17	League Two	21	3	0	0	0	0	2 (Note: Appearance(s) in EFL Trophy)	0	23	3
Crawley Town	2017–18	League Two	39	1	0	0	1	0	3	0	43	1
Crawley Town	Total		60	4	0	0	1	0	5	0	66	4
Merthyr Town (loan)	2016–17	Southern League Premier Division	6	2	0	0	—		2 (Note: Appearance(s) in FA Trophy)	1	8	3
Peterborough United	2018–19	League One	2	0	0	0	0	0	1	0	3	0
Career totals			92	6	1	0	4	1	8	1	105	8
