= Alex Davey =

Footballer (born 1994)

Personal information
- Full name: Alexander James Davey
- Date of birth: 24 November 1994 (age 31)
- Place of birth: Welwyn Garden City, England
- Height: 1.91 m (6 ft 3 in)
- Position: Defender

Youth career
- 2005–2013: Chelsea

Senior career*
Years	Team	Apps	(Gls)
2013–2017	Chelsea	0	(0)
2014–2015	→ Scunthorpe United (loan)	13	(0)
2015–2016	→ Peterborough United (loan)	7	(0)
2016	→ Stabæk (loan)	5	(0)
2016–2017	→ Crawley Town (loan)	14	(0)
2017–2018	Cheltenham Town	0	(0)
2017–2018	→ Torquay United (loan)	7	(0)
2018	Boreham Wood	13	(1)
2018–2019	Dagenham & Redbridge	10	(0)
2019–2020	Hartford Athletic	16	(0)
2020	Tampa Bay Rowdies	1	(0)
2021–2024	ÍA	28	(2)

International career^{‡}
2012–2013	Scotland U19	7	(1)
- * Club domestic league appearances and goals as of 16 March 2024 ‡ National team caps and goals as of 15:10, 29 November 2014 (UTC)

Alexander James Davey (born 24 November 1994) is a former professional footballer who played as a defender. Born in England, Davey is a former Scotland under-19 international.

== Club career ==
=== Chelsea ===
Born in Welwyn Garden City, Hertfordshire, Davey joined Chelsea at the age of ten. He made his Under-18 debut for the club as a schoolboy during the 2010–11 season, making 12 appearances. That season Davey also made his debut for the club's Reserves against Manchester United in April 2011.

In 2011–12 Davey lifted the FA Youth Cup and was youth team manager Adi Viveash's pick of the players in the second leg of the final as the trophy was won. Davey signed his first professional contract in July 2012. During the following season he was one of only two players – along with Lewis Baker – to feature in every game of both the NextGen Series and FA Youth Cup campaigns when the final was reached in both. He also became a regular at the heart of the Under-21 team defence, often partnering Nathan Aké. In total, he made 17 appearances for the older age group, finishing the season as the highest appearance maker. In 2014 Chelsea won the inaugural Under-21 Premier League; Davey made 14 appearances and scored in a 4–1 win against Southampton at St Mary's Stadium.

Before Davey was sent on his first loan deal to Scunthorpe United, he signed a new deal keeping him with the Blues until the end of the 2016 season.

On 26 November 2014, Davey joined Scunthorpe of League One on loan until 3 January 2015. He made his debut for the club in a 2–1 victory at Barnsley three days later, playing the full 90 minutes. His loan was extended to 30 June 2015, the end of the season. On 17 December, Davey scored as his team defeated Worcester City 14–13 in a penalty shootout in the FA Cup second round, a record score in the competition. He scored his first senior goal n a 2–2 draw against Chesterfield in the following round on 6 January 2015.

On 8 August 2015, Davey joined another League One team, Peterborough United, on a one-month loan deal. He made his debut for them the same day in a 2–0 away defeat to Rochdale, playing the full 90 minutes. On 1 September, he signed an extension of his loan until 3 January 2016, after impressing under manager Dave Robertson.

On 15 March 2016, Davey joined Norwegian side Stabæk on loan until 22 July 2016. On 20 March 2016, Davey made his Stabæk debut in a 2–1 home defeat to Molde, playing the full 90 minutes. Davey went on to appear four more times for Stabæk before the club terminated his loan in early June 2016.

On 12 August 2016, Davey joined League Two side Crawley Town until 3 January 2017. A day later, Davey made his Crawley Town debut in a 1–1 draw against Doncaster Rovers, playing the full 90 minutes. After falling out of favor under manager; Dermot Drummy, Crawley decided against extending his loan deal in January 2017. So he therefore, returned to Chelsea along with teammate Mitchell Beeney, after appearing 18 times in all competitions.

On 17 May 2017, Davey announced via Twitter that he would be leaving Chelsea upon the expiry of his current deal in June 2017. After leaving Chelsea, Davey joined Coventry City on trial in July 2017, although he did not managed to secure a contract with the Sky Blues.

=== Cheltenham Town ===
On 21 September 2017, Davey signed for League Two club Cheltenham Town. Davey made his Cheltenham debut during their EFL Trophy group stage tie against Forest Green Rovers in October 2017, featuring for the entire 90 minutes in the 2–1 home defeat.

After failing to make a league appearance for Cheltenham, Davey joined National League side Torquay United on a loan deal until January 2018. On the same day, he made his debut during their 1–0 away victory against Sutton United, playing the full 90 minutes. On 1 January 2018, Davey returned to Cheltenham following rumours that he was to leave the club.

=== Boreham Wood ===
On 4 January 2018, following spells at Cheltenham and Torquay, Davey opted to join Boreham Wood. Two days later, he made his debut during the Wood's 0–0 draw with Leyton Orient, playing the full 90 minutes. On 20 January 2018, Davey scored his first goal for the club during their 3–2 defeat against Dover Athletic, striking his effort past Mitch Walker in the 87th minute.

=== Dagenham & Redbridge ===
On 28 June 2018, Davey joined fellow National League side Dagenham & Redbridge on a one-year deal. In May 2019, it was announced that he would be released following the expiration of his contract at the end of the 2018–19 campaign.

=== Hartford Athletic ===
On 12 July 2019, Davey signed for USL Championship side Hartford Athletic season.

=== Tampa Bay Rowdies ===
on 2 September 2020 he joined fellow USL Championship side Tampa Bay Rowdies for the remainder of the 2020 season.

=== ÍA ===
In February 2021, Davey joined Icelandic Úrvalsdeild side ÍA. Following three years with the club, Davey announced his retirement on 5 January 2024.

== International career ==
On the international stage Davey has represented Scotland at under-19 level, though still remains eligible for England.

Davey made his debut against Germany under-19 in August 2012 as part of the UEFA Under-19 European Championship qualifying campaign

== Career statistics ==
As of match played 16 October 2021

Appearances and goals by club, season and competition
Club	Season	League			National Cup (Note: Includes FA Cup and Icelandic Cup)		League Cup (Note: Includes EFL Cup)		Other		Total	
Club	Season	Division	Apps	Goals	Apps	Goals	Apps	Goals	Apps	Goals	Apps	Goals
Chelsea	2013–14	Premier League	0	0	0	0	0	0	0	0	0	0
Chelsea	2014–15	Premier League	0	0	—		0	0	0	0	0	0
Chelsea	2015–16	Premier League	0	0	—		—		0	0	0	0
Chelsea	2016–17	Premier League	0	0	—		0	0	—		0	0
Chelsea	Total		0	0	0	0	0	0	0	0	0	0
Scunthorpe United (loan)	2014–15	League One	13	0	4	1	—		—		17	1
Peterborough United (loan)	2015–16	League One	7	0	0	0	2	0	1 (Note: Appearance in the Football League Trophy)	0	10	0
Stabæk (loan)	2016	Tippeligaen	5	0	—		—		—		5	0
Crawley Town (loan)	2016–17	League Two	14	0	2	0	—		2 (Note: Appearances in EFL Trophy)	0	18	0
Cheltenham Town	2017–18	League Two	0	0	0	0	0	0	1	0	1	0
Torquay United (loan)	2017–18	National League	7	0	—		—		1 (Note: Appearances in FA Trophy)	0	8	0
Boreham Wood	2017–18	National League	12	1	—		—		1 (Note: Appearance in National League play-offs)	0	13	1
Dagenham & Redbridge	2018–19	National League	10	0	1	0	—		0	0	11	0
Hartford Athletic	2019	USL Championship	13	0	—		—		—		13	0
Hartford Athletic	2020	USL Championship	3	0	—		—		—		3	0
Hartford Athletic	Total		16	0	—		—		—		16	0
Tampa Bay Rowdies	2020	USL Championship	1	0	—		—		—		1	0
ÍA	2021	Úrvalsdeild	19	2	5	0	—		—		24	2
Career total			104	3	12	1	2	0	6	0	124	4

== Honours ==
Chelsea Reserves

- FA Youth Cup: 2011–12
- Barclays Under 21 Premier League: 2013–14

IA

- 1. delid karla: 2023
