= Billy Clifford (footballer) =

English footballer (born 1992)

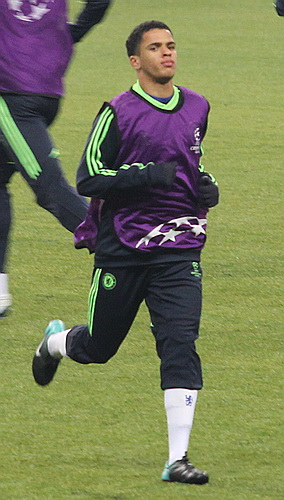
- Clifford warming up for Chelsea in 2010

Personal information
- Full name: Billy Clifford
- Date of birth: 18 October 1992 (age 34)
- Place of birth: Slough, England
- Height: 5 ft 7 in (1.70 m)
- Position: Midfielder

Team information
- Current team: Farnham Town
- Number: 18

Youth career
- 1999–2010: Chelsea

Senior career*
Years	Team	Apps	(Gls)
2010–2014	Chelsea	0	(0)
2013	→ Colchester United (loan)	18	(1)
2013	→ Yeovil Town (loan)	0	(0)
2014	→ Royal Antwerp (loan)	4	(0)
2014–2015	Walsall	13	(0)
2015–2016	Boreham Wood	21	(1)
2016–2018	Crawley Town	43	(1)
2018	Boreham Wood	0	(0)
2018	Hemel Hempstead Town	7	(1)
2018–2019	Billericay Town	11	(0)
2019	→ Slough Town (loan)	8	(1)
2019–2020	Wealdstone	31	(6)
2020–2023	Havant & Waterlooville	70	(4)
2023–2024	Ebbsfleet United	47	(3)
2024–2025	Barnet	21	(0)
2025–2026	Farnborough	28	(1)
2026–	Farnham Town	23	(3)
- * Club domestic league appearances and goals as of 14:22, 20 November 2026 (UTC)

Billy Clifford (born 18 October 1992) is an English footballer who plays as a midfielder for National League South side Farnham Town. He played in the Football League for Colchester United, Walsall and Crawley Town, in the Belgian Second Division for Royal Antwerp and National League South for Wealdstone.

== Club career ==
=== Chelsea ===
Born in Slough, Clifford came through the Chelsea academy, having signed with them at the age of 8. He turned professional in 2010. He played in Chelsea's pre-season friendly away to Ajax, and on 18 October, he joined the first team for an away Champions League game against Spartak Moscow, where he was an unused substitute. Clifford signed a new four-year contract for Chelsea in September 2011. On 19 March 2012, Clifford made headlines when he, along with Jacob Mellis, set off a smoke grenade and caused an evacuation of the club's Cobham training ground. The pair escaped with a fine after admitting he brought the grenade – understood to be from a paintball expedition – into Chelsea's Cobham training headquarters. The pair were suspended after the incident on 2 March, though Mellis was sacked.

On 11 January 2013, he joined Colchester United on a one-month loan deal, and made his debut the next day as they fell to a 2–1 home defeat to Scunthorpe – a club-record ninth successive defeat. Having been joined in Essex by his Chelsea teammate Sam Walker, also on loan, Billy started the remaining four games of his initial loan spell as the U's fortunes began to turn.

On 12 February after a 1–0 win at home to Preston North End, the loan deal was extended until the end of the season with Colchester boss Joe Dunne describing Billy as "tenacious, has great technical ability, his heart is big and it's a chance to get out and play which he has taken."

A fortnight later he scored his first goal for the club in a 2–0 win at home to Yeovil Town, before assisting Jabo Ibehre to open the scoring in another 2–0 win at Stevenage which took the U's out of the bottom four. He made his final appearance for the club on the final day of the 2012–13 season, helping the club secure a 2–0 away victory at Carlisle United to guarantee League One safety.

On 10 July 2013, Clifford joined EFL Championship side Yeovil Town on a six-month loan deal. He made his debut for Yeovil as in their EFL Cup first round victory over Southend United, on 6 August 2013. On 25 August, Clifford returned to Chelsea after failing to break into the Yeovil first team.

On 30 January 2014, Clifford was loaned for the rest of the season to Belgian club Royal Antwerp, then managed by former Chelsea striker Jimmy Floyd Hasselbaink.

=== Later career ===
On 7 August 2014, Clifford agreed to cancel his contract with Chelsea by mutual consent to seek regular football. On 8 August 2014, Walsall signed the midfielder on a six-month contract. The next day, Clifford made his debut for the club, where he came on as substitute for James Baxendale in the 70th minute, in a 1–1 draw against Port Vale. Clifford made thirteen league appearances for Walsall before leaving the club on 9 January 2015 at the end of his contract.

On 15 July 2015, Clifford joined Boreham Wood after a successful trial. He left the Wood at the end of the season after contributing to the club's successful battle against relegation.

On 20 July 2016, Clifford joined Crawley Town on a one-year deal following a successful trial. On 6 August 2016, Clifford made his Crawley debut in a 1–0 victory against Wycombe Wanderers, replacing Jason Banton in the 82nd minute. A week later, manager Dermot Drummy gave Clifford his first Crawley start in a 1–1 draw against Doncaster Rovers, in which he featured up until the 70th minute before being replaced by Bobson Bawling. On 5 November 2016, in an FA Cup tie against Bristol Rovers, Clifford scored Crawley's equaliser in a 1–1 draw, scoring in the 35th minute after Lee Brown had given the visitors the lead. On 14 May 2018, it was announced that Clifford would leave Crawley at the end of his current deal in June.

On 3 August 2018, Clifford agreed to return to Boreham Wood, signing on a non-contract basis following a successful trial period.

After featuring as an unused substitute on two occasions whilst back at Boreham Wood, Clifford opted to join National League South side Hemel Hempstead Town and went on to make his debut in a 2–0 loss against Woking in August 2018. Clifford then followed manager Dean Brennan to Billericay Town in December before joining Slough Town on loan until the end of the season in February 2019.

On 20 July 2019, Clifford signed for Wealdstone. He made his debut on 3 August 2019 in a 4–1 victory against Dartford, and then scored his first goal for the club a week later in a 4–0 win away to Braintree Town. Clifford made a total of 31 league appearances for Wealdstone, scoring 6 times and earning a place in the team of the year as his side won promotion to the National League. He signed a one-year contract extension in July 2020.

On 18 August 2020, Clifford signed for Havant & Waterlooville

On 27 January 2023, Clifford Signed for National League South side Ebbsfleet United after he was released by his former club by mutual consent.

On 24 June 2024, Clifford joined fellow National League side Barnet on a two-year contract. He played in 21 league games as Barnet won the National League title. He left the club at the end of the season.

On 3 July 2025, following his departure from Barnet, Clifford joined National League South side, Farnborough on a two-year deal. In March 2026, he joined Southern League Premier Division South club Farnham Town on a deal until the end of the season.

== Career statistics ==
=== Club ===
As of 14 November 2026

Appearances by club, season and competition
Club	Season	League			National Cup		League Cup		Other		Total	
Club	Season	Division	Apps	Goals	Apps	Goals	Apps	Goals	Apps	Goals	Apps	Goals
Chelsea	2010–11	Premier League	0	0	0	0	0	0	0	0	0	0
Chelsea	2011–12	Premier League	0	0	0	0	0	0	0	0	0	0
Chelsea	2012–13	Premier League	0	0	0	0	0	0	0	0	0	0
Chelsea	2013–14	Premier League	0	0	0	0	0	0	0	0	0	0
Chelsea	Total		0	0	0	0	0	0	0	0	0	0
Colchester United (loan)	2012–13	League One	18	1	0	0	0	0	0	0	18	1
Yeovil Town (loan)	2013–14	Championship	0	0	0	0	1	0	—		1	0
Royal Antwerp (loan)	2013–14	Belgian Second Division	4	0	0	0	—		—		4	0
Walsall	2014–15	League One	13	0	0	0	2	0	1 (Note: Appearance(s) in EFL Trophy)	0	16	0
Boreham Wood	2015–16	National League	21	1	2	0	—		0	0	23	1
Crawley Town	2016–17	League Two	36	0	2	1	0	0	4	0	42	1
Crawley Town	2017–18	League Two	7	1	1	0	1	0	3	0	12	1
Crawley Town	Total		43	1	3	1	1	0	7	0	54	2
Boreham Wood	2018–19	National League	0	0	0	0	—		0	0	0	0
Hemel Hempstead Town	2018–19	National League South	7	1	4	0	—		0	0	11	1
Billericay Town	2018–19	National League South	11	0	0	0	—		2	0	13	0
Slough Town (loan)	2018–19	National League South	8	1	0	0	—		0	0	8	1
Wealdstone	2019–20	National League South	31	6	5	1	—		1 (Note: Appearance(s) in FA Trophy)	0	37	7
Havant & Waterlooville	2020–21	National League South	12	0	2	0	—		2	0	18	0
Havant & Waterlooville	2021–22	National League South	36	3	2	0	—		1	0	39	3
Havant & Waterlooville	2022–23	National League South	22	1	1	0	—		1	0	24	1
Havant & Waterlooville	Total		70	4	5	0	—		4	0	79	4
Ebbsfleet United	2022–23	National League South	17	1	0	0	—		0	0	17	1
Ebbsfleet United	2023–24	National League	30	2	0	0	—		0	0	30	2
Ebbsfleet United	Total		47	3	0	0	—		0	0	47	3
Barnet	2024–25	National League	21	0	0	0	—		2	0	23	0
Farnborough	2025–26	National League South	28	1	1	0	—		1	1	30	2
Farnham Town	2025–26	SFL Premier Division South	7	1	—		—		2 (Note: Appearance(s) in Southern League Premier Division South play-offs)	3	9	4
Farnham Town	2026–27	National League South	16	2	2	0	—		1	0	19	2
Farnham Town	Total		23	3	2	0	—		3	3	28	6
Career total			344	22	22	2	4	0	21	4	391	28

== Honours ==
Wealdstone

- National League South: 2019–20

Barnet

- National League: 2024–25

Farnham Town

- Surrey Senior Cup: 2025–26
- Southern League Premier Division South play-offs: 2025–26
