= Glenn Morris (footballer) =

English footballer (born 1983)

Personal information
- Full name: Glenn James Morris
- Date of birth: 20 December 1983 (age 42)
- Place of birth: Woolwich, England
- Height: 6 ft 0 in (1.83 m)
- Position: Goalkeeper

Team information
- Current team: Dorking Wanderers
- Number: 1

Youth career
- –2001: Leyton Orient

Senior career*
Years	Team	Apps	(Gls)
2001–2010	Leyton Orient	124	(0)
2010–2012	Southend United	57	(0)
2012–2014	Aldershot Town	34	(0)
2014–2016	Gillingham	10	(0)
2016–2023	Crawley Town	257	(0)
2022–2023	→ Gillingham (loan)	18	(0)
2023–2026	Gillingham	98	(0)
2026–	Dorking Wanderers	13	(0)
- * Club domestic league appearances and goals as of 12:38, 31 October 2026 (UTC)

Glenn James Morris (born 20 December 1983) is an English professional footballer who plays as a goalkeeper for National League South club Dorking Wanderers.

== Early life ==
Morris was born in Woolwich, Greater London.

== Career ==
=== Leyton Orient ===
Morris made his professional debut for Leyton Orient in October 2001 in an EFL Trophy fixture away to Dagenham and Redbridge before making his first league appearance in April 2002 in a 1–1 draw at home to Exeter City.

In the 2006–07 season, Morris become an understudy to first choice goalkeeper Glyn Garner. However, late in the 2007–08 season he broke into the first team and made his 100th appearance (including cup matches) for the club. Morris has played in a Youth Alliance Cup Final at the Millennium Stadium in Cardiff, he kept a clean sheet as Orient beat Bradford City. Morris was voted young player of the year at Orient in 2003 and 2004.

Morris was released on 9 May 2010 by Orient manager Russell Slade.

=== Southend United ===
On 5 August 2010, Morris signed a one-year deal with Southend United. Morris was given the number 1 jersey and established himself as Southend's first choice ahead of fellow new signing Rhys Evans. After 37 appearances in all competitions, Morris was rewarded for his performance with a further one-year contract.

On 18 May 2012, Morris was one of eleven players to be released at the end of their contract.

=== Aldershot Town ===
On 1 August 2012, Morris played for Portsmouth in a friendly at Aldershot Town. He then signed for Aldershot on a six-month deal. This was then extended to the end of the season. After making 6 appearances during the 2012–13 season, Morris signed a one-year contract extension.

=== Gillingham ===
In 2014, he signed for Gillingham on a one-year deal. He signed a one-year extension at the end of the 2014–15 season, but was released at the end of his contract.

=== Crawley Town ===
After leaving Gillingham, he joined Crawley Town in May 2016 as a player-coach, on a one-year contract. On 17 September 2016, Morris made his Crawley Town debut in a 2–0 victory over Luton Town. On 10 March 2017, after displacing Yusuf Mersin and Chelsea loanee Mitchell Beeney, Morris signed a new two-year deal with Crawley running until June 2019. He won the Player of the Year award for Crawley Town for the 2016–17 season.

During the 2017–18 season, Morris made 44 league appearances for the club, and won Crawley's Player of the Year award for the second time. before signing a contract extension in January 2018 until the summer of 2020.

He appeared in all 46 of Crawley's league games during 2018–19. At the end of the 2018–19 season, Morris received a trio of awards for his performances that season, again receiving the Player of the Year award, alongside the Players' Player accolade and the award for the best away player. In September 2019 he signed a new contract until 2021. At the conclusion of the 2020–21 season the club triggered a one-year extension to his contract.

In 2021–22 he was named as the side's Player of the Season for a fourth time.

=== Gillingham ===
On 29 July 2022, the eve of the new season, Morris returned to Gillingham on loan until January 2023. Shortly after his loan spell came to an end, he agreed to terminate his contract with Crawley and join Gillingham on a permanent basis. On 28 April 2023 Gillingham confirmed that he had signed a new contract but did not specify its length. On 30 April 2023 he was named as the Kent side's Player of the Season for 2022–23.

On 15 May 2024, the club announced he had been offered a new contract. Six days later, Morris signed a new one-year deal with Gillingham, staying at the club until summer 2025.

In the 2024–25 season Morris became the oldest player to ever feature for Gillingham's first team, overtaking a record that had been held by Andy Hessenthaler since 2005. Having kept three clean sheets in four matches, he was named EFL League Two Player of the Month for September 2024. Morris was again named Gillingham's Player of the Year at the conclusion of the 2024–25 season, in addition to receiving the Players' Player of the Year award. Following the conclusion of the season, he signed a new one-year contract extension.

He was released by Gillingham at the end of the 2025–26 season.

=== Dorking Wanderers ===
On 19 May 2026, Morris agreed to join National League South club Dorking Wanderers.

== Career statistics ==
As of match played 27 October 2026

Appearances and goals by club, season and competition
Club	Season	League			FA Cup		League Cup		Other		Total	
Club	Season	Division	Apps	Goals	Apps	Goals	Apps	Goals	Apps	Goals	Apps	Goals
Leyton Orient	2001–02	Third Division	2	0	0	0	0	0	1 (Note: Appearance(s) in Football League Trophy)	0	3	0
Leyton Orient	2002–03	Third Division	23	0	1	0	2	0	2	0	28	0
Leyton Orient	2003–04	Third Division	27	0	1	0	1	0	0	0	29	0
Leyton Orient	2004–05	League Two	12	0	0	0	1	0	4	0	17	0
Leyton Orient	2005–06	League Two	4	0	0	0	0	0	2	0	6	0
Leyton Orient	2006–07	League One	3	0	0	0	0	0	0	0	3	0
Leyton Orient	2007–08	League One	16	0	1	0	0	0	2	0	19	0
Leyton Orient	2008–09	League One	26	0	3	0	1	0	0	0	30	0
Leyton Orient	2009–10	League One	11	0	2	0	2	0	0	0	15	0
Leyton Orient	Total		124	0	8	0	7	0	11	0	150	0
Southend United	2010–11	League Two	33	0	2	0	2	0	0	0	37	0
Southend United	2011–12	League Two	24	0	0	0	1	0	2	0	27	0
Southend United	Total		57	0	2	0	3	0	2	0	64	0
Aldershot Town	2012–13	League Two	2	0	1	0	0	0	2	0	5	0
Aldershot Town	2013–14	Conference Premier	31	0	1	0	—		2 (Note: Appearances in FA Trophy)	0	34	0
Aldershot Town	Total		33	0	2	0	0	0	4	0	39	0
Gillingham	2014–15	League One	10	0	0	0	1	0	1	0	12	0
Gillingham	2015–16	League One	0	0	0	0	0	0	0	0	0	0
Gillingham	Total		10	0	0	0	1	0	1	0	12	0
Crawley Town	2016–17	League Two	39	0	2	0	0	0	0	0	41	0
Crawley Town	2017–18	League Two	44	0	1	0	1	0	0	0	46	0
Crawley Town	2018–19	League Two	46	0	2	0	0	0	0	0	48	0
Crawley Town	2019–20	League Two	37	0	2	0	0	0	0	0	39	0
Crawley Town	2020–21	League Two	45	0	3	0	0	0	0	0	48	0
Crawley Town	2021–22	League Two	46	0	1	0	0	0	0	0	47	0
Crawley Town	2022–23	League Two	0	0	0	0	0	0	0	0	0	0
Crawley Town	Total		257	0	11	0	1	0	0	0	269	0
Gillingham (loan)	2022–23	League Two	18	0	1	0	0	0	0	0	19	0
Gillingham	2022–23	League Two	22	0	0	0	0	0	0	0	22	0
Gillingham	2023–24	League Two	9	0	0	0	2	0	3	0	14	0
Gillingham	2024–25	League Two	36	0	1	0	1	0	0	0	38	0
Gillingham	2025–26	League Two	31	0	0	0	0	0	0	0	31	0
Gillingham	Total		116	0	2	0	3	0	3	0	124	0
Dorking Wanderers	2026–27	National League South	13	0	4	0	—		0	0	17	0
Career total			610	0	30	0	16	0	21	0	665	0

== Honours ==
Leyton Orient

- Football League Two third-place promotion: 2005–06

Individual

- EFL League Two Player of the Month: September 2024
- Crawley Town Player of the Season: 2016–17, 2017–18, 2018–19, 2021–22
- Gillingham Player of the Season: 2022–23, 2024–25
