= Jason Banton =

English footballer (born 1992)

Personal information
- Full name: Jason Steve Banton
- Date of birth: 15 December 1992 (age 33)
- Place of birth: Tottenham, England
- Height: 6 ft 0 in (1.83 m)
- Positions: Winger; forward

Youth career
- 2000–2008: Arsenal
- 2008–2010: Blackburn Rovers

Senior career*
Years	Team	Apps	(Gls)
2011	Liverpool	0	(0)
2011	Leicester City	0	(0)
2011	→ Burton Albion (loan)	1	(0)
2012–2014	Crystal Palace	0	(0)
2013	→ Plymouth Argyle (loan)	14	(6)
2013–2014	→ Milton Keynes Dons (loan)	11	(2)
2014–2015	Plymouth Argyle	38	(1)
2015–2016	Wycombe Wanderers	5	(1)
2015	→ Hartlepool United (loan)	4	(0)
2016	Notts County	9	(0)
2016–2017	Crawley Town	14	(0)
2017	→ Partick Thistle (loan)	0	(0)
2017–2018	Woking	25	(3)
2018–2019	Torquay United	6	(0)
2018	→ St Albans City (loan)	5	(0)
2018–2019	→ Dulwich Hamlet (loan)	5	(0)
2019	→ Truro City (loan)	7	(0)
2019	Braintree Town	12	(4)
2019–2020	Romford	7	(0)
2020–2021	Cray Wanderers	5	(1)
2020	→ Braintree Town (dual-reg.)	2	(0)
2021–2022	Kingstonian	25	(2)
2022	→ Bishop's Stortford (loan)	9	(0)
2022	Sittingbourne	5	(0)
2022	Herne Bay	8	(0)
2022–2023	Brightlingsea Regent	11	(0)
2023	Hendon	0	(0)
2023–2024	Glebe	15	(2)
2024	Bearsted	8	(0)
2024	Walthamstow	6	(0)

International career
2008	England U17	4	(0)
- * Club domestic league appearances and goals as of 22:02, 17 December 2024 (UTC)

Jason Steve Banton (born 15 December 1992) is an English footballer who plays as a winger.

An England under-17 international, he had a number of clubs as a young player, spending time at Arsenal, Blackburn Rovers, Liverpool and Leicester City, before making his debut in the Football League on loan at Burton Albion in October 2011. He signed with Crystal Palace in 2012, and was loaned out to Plymouth Argyle and Milton Keynes Dons before joining Plymouth permanently in January 2014. He signed with Wycombe Wanderers in June 2015, and spent a brief time on loan at Hartlepool United. On 13 February 2016, he signed for Notts County until the end of the 2015–16 season, he was released by Notts at the end of the season and signed for Crawley Town, subsequently going on loan to Scottish Premiership side Partick Thistle. At the end of the 2016–17 season Banton was released by Crawley and joined National League Woking. On 20 June 2018, he joined Gary Owers' National League South challengers Torquay United. Banton went onto have spells at Braintree Town, Romford and Cray Wanderers before eventually joining Kingstonian ahead of the 2021–22 campaign.He signed with Sittingbourne FC in June 2022. In October 2022, Banton signed for Herne Bay. In December 2022, Banton transferred to Brightlingsea Regent.

== Playing career ==
Banton was born in Tottenham. He began playing for Arsenal's youth teams at the age of seven and progressed through their academy to be offered scholarship terms. He left Arsenal in 2008 after becoming "disillusioned" by his lack of progress, and signed with Blackburn Rovers in October. In his first year with the club, Banton was the top-scorer in their academy side. Banton had his contract at Blackburn terminated towards the end of 2010. He joined Liverpool in January 2011 after spending time there on trial. Banton was released at the end of the season without making a first-team appearance for the club.

He signed a one-year contract with Leicester City in summer 2011. He joined Burton Albion on loan for one month on 30 September, and made his first-team debut the next day against Bradford City. Banton returned to Leicester without making another appearance for Burton and had his contract cancelled by mutual consent in December.

In January 2012, Banton signed with Major League Soccer and entered the MLS SuperDraft. He was selected by Seattle Sounders FC in the second round of the 2012 MLS Supplemental Draft as the 34th pick overall. Describing his position in the draft, Banton said: "It doesn't mean anything. I'm just glad to get the opportunity to come to Seattle." The club's technical director Chris Henderson said: "We think he's a guy who, depending on how things play out with our wingers, can step in on either flank." Banton was cut by the Sounders in February after attending training camps in Washington and Arizona.

Banton then returned to England and joined Crystal Palace on trial in the summer, where he was given a contract through to the end of the 2012–13 season in October. He made his first-team debut for Palace in an FA Cup tie against Stoke City in January 2013. Later that month, Banton joined Plymouth Argyle on loan until March. "He can be a very exciting player," said manager John Sheridan. "I thought it was important we got a player who is going to gain us that ground, 30 or 40 yards on up the pitch, quickly." Banton made his debut in a 0–0 draw with Dagenham & Redbridge, and scored both goals in a 2–1 win at Aldershot Town a week later. In March, he signed a new one-year contract with Palace and extended his loan with Argyle until the end of the season. Banton won the Football League Two Player of the Month award for March after scoring three goals in six appearances. In all, he played in 14 matches for Argyle and scored six goals before being recalled by Palace in April.

At the start of the 2013–14 season, he moved to Milton Keynes Dons on loan until January 2014. Banton made his debut against Shrewsbury Town on 3 August and scored his first goal for the club in a League Cup tie at Northampton Town three days later. He scored two more goals and had made 17 appearances in all competitions before losing his place in the team in December. Having not played in a first team game for nearly a month, and with his loan due to expire, he returned to Crystal Palace at the start of January.

In January 2014, Banton rejoined Plymouth Argyle permanently by signing an 18-month contract. He helped the "Pilgrims" to reach the League Two play-offs in 2014–15, and scored against Wycombe Wanderers in the semi-final first leg at Home Park, though Plymouth lost the tie 5–3 on aggregate. He was released at the end of the 2014–15 season.

In June 2015, Banton joined League Two side Wycombe Wanderers on a one-year contract after impressing manager Gareth Ainsworth in the play-off semi-final encounter against the club. However, having found first-team opportunities hard to come by, in October he moved on loan to Hartlepool United after being described by manager Ronnie Moore as a "winner". He returned to his parent club a month later after having his loan spell cut short. He began training with Port Vale in January 2016 as manager Rob Page considered a loan or transfer deal. Page chose not to sign him due to Banton's lack of match fitness, though Banton still had his contract with Wycombe cancelled by mutual consent. He had a trial with Notts County the following month.

On 13 February 2016, following a successful trial, Banton joined fellow League Two side Notts County on a deal for the remainder of the 2015–16 campaign. Three days later, Banton made his Notts County in their 3–2 away victory against Hartlepool United, featuring for 76 minutes before being replaced by Adam Campbell. Banton went onto feature eight more times for Notts County, before leaving the club at the end of the campaign upon the expiry of his current deal.

On 24 May 2016, it was announced that Banton had signed a one-year contract at League Two side Crawley Town. On the opening day of the 2016–17 campaign, Banton made his Crawley debut in their 1–0 home victory against his former club; Wycombe Wanderers. In which, Banton featured for 82 minutes before being replaced by Billy Clifford. Although Banton impressed within his first few months at Crawley, he was dropped by manager Dermot Drummy and was instead sent out on loan to Scottish side Partick Thistle on loan for the remainder of the campaign. Within his first week at Partick Thistle, Banton suffered an injury which ruled him out for the rest of the season and he therefore, failed to make an appearance for the Jags.

On 30 May 2017, it was announced that Banton would leave Crawley upon the expiry of his contract in June 2017.

On 27 June 2017, it was announced that Banton had signed for National League side Woking. After struggling with a thigh injury, Banton made his Woking debut on 19 August 2017, during their league tie against Leyton Orient, replacing Bobson Bawling in the 2–0 defeat. On 2 September 2017, Banton scored his first Woking goal courtesy of an error by Macclesfield Town goalkeeper Shwan Jalal, during the Cards' 3–1 victory. Just over a week later, Banton scored Woking's first during their 2–1 home victory over Solihull Moors.

On 16 May 2018, during the unveiling of new manager Alan Dowson, it was announced by the director of football, Geoff Chapple, that Banton's two-year deal had been terminated.

Following his release from Woking, Banton joined newly relegated National League South side Torquay United on a one-year deal.

After four months at Braintree Town, Banton joined Romford on 6 December 2019.

Banton joined Isthmian League Premier Division side Cray Wanderers ahead of their 2020–21 season. When the UK entered a second lockdown due to the COVID-19 pandemic in the United Kingdom, Cray Wanderers were unable to play, so Banton went on dual-registration with Braintree Town.

On 27 May 2021, Banton agreed to join Kingstonian ahead of the 2021–22 campaign and went onto make his debut during a 1–0 victory over Haringey Borough.

In February 2022, he signed for Isthmian League rivals Bishop's Stortford on loan, with The Blues sat in the play-off places on the hunt for promotion.

In June 2022, Banton joined Sittingbourne.

In October 2022, Banton signed for Herne Bay.

In December 2022, Banton transferred to Brightlingsea Regent after making 8 appearances for Herne Bay.

On 14 March 2023, Banton announced his retirement from football.

In July 2023, Banton came out of retirement to join Hendon. In December 2023, he joined SCEFL Premier Division club Glebe. He announced his departure from Glebe in April 2024.

Having started the season with Bearsted, Banton joined Walthamstow before departing the club in December 2024.

== Personal life ==
Banton is a convert to Islam.

== Career statistics ==
As of match played 14 December 2024

Appearances and goals by club, season and competition
Club	Season	League			FA Cup		League Cup		Other		Total	
Club	Season	Division	Apps	Goals	Apps	Goals	Apps	Goals	Apps	Goals	Apps	Goals
Liverpool	2010–11	Premier League	0	0	0	0	0	0	0	0	0	0
Leicester City	2011–12	Championship	0	0	0	0	0	0	0	0	0	0
Burton Albion (loan)	2011–12	League Two	1	0	0	0	0	0	0	0	1	0
Crystal Palace	2012–13	Championship	0	0	1	0	0	0	0	0	1	0
Crystal Palace	2013–14	Premier League	0	0	0	0	0	0	0	0	0	0
Crystal Palace	Total		0	0	1	0	0	0	0	0	1	0
Plymouth Argyle (loan)	2012–13	League Two	14	6	0	0	0	0	0	0	14	6
Milton Keynes Dons (loan)	2013–14	League One	11	2	2	0	2	1	2 (Note: Appearances in the Football League Trophy)	0	17	3
Plymouth Argyle	2013–14	League Two	13	1	0	0	0	0	0	0	13	1
Plymouth Argyle	2014–15	League Two	25	0	1	0	1	0	2 (Note: Appearances in the League Two play-offs)	1	29	1
Plymouth Argyle	Total		38	1	1	0	1	0	2	1	42	2
Wycombe Wanderers	2015–16	League Two	5	1	0	0	1	0	1	0	7	1
Hartlepool United (loan)	2015–16	League Two	4	0	1	0	0	0	0	0	6	0
Notts County	2015–16	League Two	9	0	0	0	0	0	0	0	9	0
Crawley Town	2016–17	League Two	14	0	0	0	1	0	4 (Note: Appearances in the EFL Trophy)	0	19	0
Partick Thistle (loan)	2016–17	Scottish Premiership	0	0	0	0	—		—		0	0
Woking	2017–18	National League	25	3	3	0	—		1 (Note: Appearances in the FA Trophy)	0	29	3
Torquay United	2018–19	National League South	6	0	0	0	—		0	0	6	0
St Albans City (loan)	2018–19	National League South	5	0	0	0	—		0	0	5	0
Dulwich Hamlet (loan)	2018–19	National League South	5	0	0	0	—		1	0	6	0
Truro City (loan)	2018–19	National League South	7	0	0	0	—		0	0	7	0
Braintree Town	2019–20	National League South	12	4	1	0	—		1	1	14	5
Romford	2019–20	Isthmian League North Division	7	0	—		—		0	0	7	0
Cray Wanderers	2020–21	Isthmian League Premier Division	5	1	2	2	—		3	1	10	4
Braintree Town (dual-reg.)	2020–21	National League South	2	0	—		—		0	0	2	0
Kingstonian	2021–22	Isthmian League Premier Division	25	2	4	2	—		4	1	33	4
Bishop's Stortford (loan)	2021–22	Isthmian League Premier Division	1	0	—		—		—		1	0
Sittingbourne	2022–23	Isthmian League South East Division	5	0	—		—		—		5	0
Herne Bay	2022–23	Isthmian League Premier Division	6	0	—		1	0	1	0	8	0
Brightlingsea Regent	2022–23	Isthmian League Premier Division	11	0	—		0	0	0	0	11	0
Glebe	2023–24	SCEFL Premier Division	15	2	—		—		0	0	15	2
Bearsted	2024–25	SCEFL Premier Division	8	0	0	0	—		2 (Note: Appearance(s) in FA Vase)	1	10	1
Walthamstow	2024–25	Isthmian League North Division	6	0	—		—		1 (Note: Appearance(s) in Essex Senior Cup)	0	7	0
Career total			249	22	15	4	5	1	22	5	293	32
