= 2016–17 Crawley Town F.C. season =

Crawley Town
2016–17 season
- Chairman: Ziya Eren
- Manager: Dermot Drummy (until 4 May 2017) Matt Harrold (caretaker) (6 May 2017)
- Stadium: Broadfield Stadium
- League Two: 19th
- FA Cup: First round (eliminated by Bristol Rovers)
- EFL Cup: First round (eliminated by Wolverhampton Wanderers)
- EFL Trophy: Second round (eliminated by Coventry City)
- Sussex Senior Cup: Runners-up (eliminated by Brighton & Hove Albion)
- Top goalscorer: League: James Collins (20); All: James Collins (22)
- Highest home attendance: 5,350 vs Portsmouth (7 March 2017)
- Lowest home attendance: 881 vs Colchester United (30 August 2016)
- Average home league attendance: 2,457
Home colours	Away colours

The 2016–17 season will be Crawley Town's 121st season in their history and their second consecutive season in League Two. Along with League Two, the club will also compete in the FA Cup, EFL Cup and EFL Trophy.

The season covers the period from 1 July 2016 to 30 June 2017.

== Players ==
=== First team squad ===
As of 6 May 2017

No.	Name	Nat	Position	Since	Date of birth (age)	Signed from	Games	Goals
Goalkeepers
12	Glenn Morris	(England)	GK	2016	20 December 1983 (age 42)	(England) Gillingham	41	0
13	Yusuf Mersin	(Turkey)	GK	2016	23 September 1994 (age 32)	(Turkey) Kasımpaşa	10	0
Defenders
2	Lewis Young	(England)	RB	2014	27 September 1989 (age 37)	(England) Bury	134	0
3	Chris Arthur	(England)	LB	2016	25 January 1990 (age 36)	(England) Woking	12	0
6	Mark Connolly	(Republic of Ireland)	CB	2016	16 December 1991 (age 34)	(Scotland) Kilmarnock	126	6
14	Andre Blackman	(England)	LB	2016	10 November 1990 (age 36)	(Morocco) MAS Fez	35	0
15	Josh Yorwerth	(Wales)	CB	2016	28 February 1995 (age 31)	(England) Ipswich Town	48	3
16	Addison Garnett	(England)	CB	2016	13 September 1996 (age 30)	(England) Hendon	4	0
22	Joe McNerney	(England)	CB	2015	24 January 1990 (age 36)	(England) Woking	48	4
25	Josh Lelan	(Kenya)	CB	2017	21 December 1994 (age 31)	(England) Derby County	13	0
Midfielders
4	Josh Payne	(England)	DM	2016	25 November 1990 (age 35)	(England) Eastleigh	33	1
7	Enzio Boldewijn	(Netherlands)	RW	2016	17 November 1992 (age 33)	(Netherlands) Almere City	52	6
8	Jimmy Smith	(England)	CM	2014	7 January 1987 (age 39)	(England) Stevenage	126	9
11	Jordan Roberts	(England)	LW	2016	5 January 1994 (age 32)	(Scotland) Inverness Caledonian Thistle	26	4
17	Bobson Bawling	(England)	RM	2014	21 September 1995 (age 31)	(England) Watford	81	0
18	Billy Clifford	(England)	CM	2016	18 October 1992 (age 34)	(England) Boreham Wood	42	1
20	Aryan Tajbakhsh	(England)	DM	2016	27 October 1990 (age 36)	(England) Cray Wanderers	9	0
24	Kaby Djaló	(Guinea-Bissau)	CM	2016	5 February 1992 (age 34)	(Finland) PS Kemi	33	1
28	Dean Cox	(England)	LW	2016	12 August 1987 (age 39)	(England) Leyton Orient	22	2
44	Conor Henderson	(Republic of Ireland)	CM	2016	8 September 1991 (age 35)	(England) Grimsby Town	36	2
Forwards
9	Matt Harrold	(England)	FW	2014	25 July 1984 (age 42)	(England) Bristol Rovers	77	11
19	James Collins	(Republic of Ireland)	FW	2016	1 December 1990 (age 35)	(England) Shrewsbury Town	51	22
39	Rhys Murphy	(Republic of Ireland)	FW	2017	6 November 1990 (age 36)	on loan from (England) Forest Green Rovers	31	10

== New contracts ==
Date	Position	Nationality	Name	Contract length	Contract end	Ref.
28 October 2016	CM	(England)	Jimmy Smith	2 years	2019	
3 March 2017	CB	(England)	Joe McNerney	2 years	2019	
10 March 2017	GK	(England)	Glenn Morris	2 years	2019	
30 May 2017	CB	(Wales)	Josh Yorwerth	1 year	2018	
29 June 2017	CF	(England)	Matt Harrold	1 year	2018	

== Transfers ==
=== In ===
Date from	Position	Nationality	Name	From	Fee	Ref.
1 July 2016	LB	ENG	Chris Arthur	Woking	Free transfer	
1 July 2016	LM	ENG	Jason Banton	Notts County	Free transfer	
1 July 2016	RW	NED	Enzio Boldewijn	Almere City	Free transfer	
1 July 2016	GK	TUR	Yusuf Mersin	Kasımpaşa	Free transfer	
1 July 2016	GK	ENG	Glenn Morris	Gillingham	Free transfer	
1 July 2016	DM	ENG	Josh Payne	Eastleigh	Free transfer	
1 July 2016	LM	ENG	Jordan Roberts	Inverness Caledonian Thistle	Free transfer	
1 July 2016	CB	WAL	Josh Yorwerth	Ipswich Town	Free transfer	
2 July 2016	CB	IRL	Mark Connolly	Kilmarnock	Free transfer	
2 July 2016	RB	TUR	Alper Tursun	Alanyaspor	Free transfer	
11 July 2016	CF	IRL	James Collins	Shrewsbury Town	Free transfer	
12 July 2016	RM	ENG	Aryan Tajbakhsh	Cray Wanderers	Free transfer	
13 July 2016	CB	ENG	Addison Garnett	Hendon	Free transfer	
19 July 2016	LB	ENG	Andre Blackman	MAS Fez	Free transfer	
20 July 2016	CM	ENG	Billy Clifford	Boreham Wood	Free transfer	
9 August 2016	CB	GHA	Daniel Pappoe	Hemel Hempstead Town	Free transfer	
31 August 2016	CM	GNB	Kaby Djaló	PS Kemi	Free transfer	
13 September 2016	LW	ENG	Dean Cox	Leyton Orient	Free transfer	
1 November 2016	CM	IRL	Conor Henderson	Grimsby Town	Free transfer	
1 November 2016	LW	ENG	Sanchez Watt	Kerala Blasters	Free transfer	
26 January 2017	CB	KEN	Josh Lelan	Derby County	Free transfer	

=== Out ===
Date from	Position	Nationality	Name	To	Fee	Ref.
1 July 2016	CB	ENG	Jon Ashton	Braintree Town (Note: Following Ashton's release, he joined Braintree Town.)	Released	
1 July 2016	CF	ENG	Lee Barnard	Braintree Town (Note: Following Barnard's release, he joined Braintree Town.)	Released	
1 July 2016	CM	ENG	Andy Bond	AFC Fylde (Note: Following Bond's release, he joined AFC Fylde.)	Released	
1 July 2016	LM	ENG	Roarie Deacon	Sutton United (Note: Following Deacon's release, he joined Sutton United.)	Released	
1 July 2016	LW	ENG	Lyle Della-Verde	Welling United (Note: Following Della-Verde's release, he joined Welling United.)	Released	
24 June 2016	RW	WAL	Gwion Edwards	Peterborough United	Undisclosed	
1 July 2016	CF	IRL	Shamir Fenelon	Aldershot Town (Note: Following Fenelon's release, he joined Aldershot Town.)	Released	
1 July 2016	RB	IRL	Lanre Oyebanjo	York City (Note: Following Oyebanjo's release, he joined York City.)	Released	
1 July 2016	GK	WAL	Callum Preston	Altrincham (Note: Following Preston's release, he joined Altrincham.)	Released	
1 July 2016	CF	ENG	Gavin Tomlin	Dulwich Hamlet (Note: Following Tomlin's release, he joined Dulwich Hamlet.)	Released	
1 July 2016	CM	ENG	Simon Walton	Garforth Town (Note: Following Walton's release, he joined Garforth Town.)	Released	
11 July 2016	CB	ENG	Sonny Bradley	Plymouth Argyle	Free transfer	
3 August 2016	RB	TUR	Alper Tursun	Darıca Gençlerbirliği (Note: Following Tursun's release, he joined Darıca Gençlerbirliği.)	Released	
11 January 2017	CB	GHA	Daniel Pappoe	New Radiant	Free transfer	
31 January 2017	LW	ENG	Sanchez Watt	Billericay Town (Note: Following Watt's release, he joined Billericay Town.)	Released	

=== Loans in ===
Date from	Position	Nationality	Name	From	Date until	Ref.
1 July 2016	GK	ENG	Mitchell Beeney	Chelsea	3 January 2017	
2 August 2016	CF	TAN	Adi Yussuf	Mansfield Town	1 January 2017 (Note: Yussuf's loan was terminated on 1 January 2017.)	
11 August 2016	CB	SCO	Alex Davey	Chelsea	3 January 2017	
31 January 2017	CF	IRL	Rhys Murphy	Forest Green Rovers	End of Season	

=== Loans out ===
Date from	Position	Nationality	Name	To	Date until	Ref.
22 September 2016	LW	ENG	Dean Cox	Burgess Hill Town	1 January 2017	
8 October 2016	CB	WAL	Josh Yorwerth	Merthyr Town	14 November 2016 (Note: Yorwerth's loan was extended on 4 November 2016, until 4 January 2017.) (Note: Yorwerth's loan was terminated on 14 November 2016.)	
31 January 2017	LB	ENG	Chris Arthur	Woking	8 April 2017 (Note: Arthur's loan was extended on 3 March 2017, until 8 April 2017.)	
31 January 2017	LM	ENG	Jason Banton	Partick Thistle	End of season	
17 February 2017	DM	ENG	Aryan Tajbakhsh	Wealdstone	18 April 2017 (Note: Tajbakhsh's loan was extended on 17 March 2017, until 18 April 2017.)	

== Friendlies ==
=== Pre-season friendlies ===
9 July 2016 Friendly	East Grinstead Town	2–9	Crawley Town	East Grinstead
15:00 BST	Hayes 21'; Healy 73'	Report	Clifford 7'; Adarabioyo 8'; Roberts 22'; Smith 35' (pen.); Young 62', 70', 74'; Banton 75', 80'	Stadium: East Court; Attendance: 420

12 July 2016 Friendly	Three Bridges	0–6	Crawley Town	Three Bridges
19:45 BST		Report	Collins 8', 15'; Oyebanjo 12'; Roberts 33'; Payne 42'; Banton 44'	Stadium: Jubilee Field

16 July 2016 Friendly	Crawley Town	0–4	Brighton & Hove Albion	Crawley
15:00 BST		Report	Kayal 18'; Hemed 32'; Murray 49'; Manu 86'	Stadium: Broadfield Stadium; Attendance: 2,197

19 July 2016 Friendly	Crawley Town	2–1	Worthing	Three Bridges
19:45 BST	Banton 16'; Bawling 54'	Report	Sparkes 41'	Stadium: Jubilee Field; Attendance: 350

23 July 2016 Friendly	Crawley Town	2–3	Millwall	Crawley
15:00 BST	Boldewijn 22'; Roberts 35'	Report	Gregory 17'; Williams 66'; Morison 82'	Stadium: Broadfield Stadium; Attendance: 1,278; Referee: Tim Lawrence

26 July 2016 Friendly	Lewes	1–3	Crawley Town	Lewes
19:45 BST	Perry 72'	Report	Bawling 2', 19'; Clifford 86'	Stadium: The Dripping Pan

30 July 2016 Friendly	Aldershot Town	0–0	Crawley Town	Aldershot
15:00 BST		Report		Stadium: Recreation Ground

== Competitions ==
=== Overview ===
Competition	Record							
Competition	G	W	D	L	GF	GA	GD	Win %
League Two	46	13	12	21	53	71	−18	28.26
FA Cup	2	0	1	1	3	5	−2	0.00
EFL Cup	1	0	0	1	1	2	−1	0.00
EFL Trophy	4	2	0	2	3	5	−2	50.00
Total	53	15	13	25	60	83	−23	28.30

Updated to match played 6 May 2017
Source: Competitions

=== League Two ===
==== League table ====
Pos	Team	Pld	W	D	L	GF	GA	GD	Pts
17	Crewe Alexandra	46	14	13	19	58	67	−9	55
18	Morecambe	46	14	10	22	53	73	−20	52
19	Crawley Town	46	13	12	21	53	71	−18	51
20	Yeovil Town	46	11	17	18	49	64	−15	50
21	Cheltenham Town	46	12	14	20	49	69	−20	50

Updated to match(es) played on 6 May 2017. Source: BBC Sport
Rules for classification: 1) Points; 2) Goal difference; 3) Number of goals scored

==== Results summary ====
Overall								Home						Away					
Pld	W	D	L	GF	GA	GD	Pts	W	D	L	GF	GA	GD	W	D	L	GF	GA	GD
46	13	12	21	53	71	−18	51	8	7	8	29	30	−1	5	5	13	24	41	−17

Last updated: 6 May 2017.
Source: League Two

==== Results by matchday ====
Matchday	1	2	3	4	5	6	7	8	9	10	11	12	13	14	15	16	17	18	19	20	21	22	23	24	25	26	27	28	29	30	31	32	33	34	35	36	37	38	39	40	41	42	43	44	45	46
Ground	H	A	A	H	H	A	A	H	A	H	H	A	A	H	A	H	A	H	A	A	H	A	A	H	H	A	H	A	A	A	H	A	H	H	H	A	H	A	H	A	H	H	A	H	A	H
Result	W	D	W	D	L	L	L	W	W	D	W	D	L	D	L	L	L	W	L	W	W	L	L	W	W	L	L	D	L	W	L	W	L	D	L	D	L	D	W	L	L	D	L	D	L	D
Position	8	8	4	2	9	13	18	13	11	12	5	6	9	9	10	13	16	16	16	15	11	14	15	13	13	15	16	16	17	15	16	16	16	16	16	16	17	19	17	18	18	19	20	19	21	19

Updated to match(es) played on 6 May 2017. Source: Fixtures
A = Away; H = Home; W = Win; D = Draw; L = Loss

==== Matches ====
Win Draw Loss

The fixtures for the 2016–17 season were announced on 22 June 2016 at 9am.

6 August 2016 1	Crawley Town	1–0	Wycombe Wanderers	Crawley
15:00 BST	Smith 59'; Blackman (yellow card) 54' (yellow-red card) 90+2'; Harrold (yellow card) 90+4'	Report	Jacobson (yellow card) 78'	Stadium: Broadfield Stadium; Attendance: 2,471; Referee: Nick Kinseley

13 August 2016 2	Doncaster Rovers	1–1	Crawley Town	Doncaster
15:00 BST	Coppinger 49'; Houghton (yellow card) 83'	Report	Collins 26'; Davey (yellow card) 89'; Smith (yellow card) 90+2'; Blackman (yellow card) 90+5'	Stadium: Keepmoat Stadium; Attendance: 4,327; Referee: Brett Huxtable

16 August 2016 3	Exeter City	0–1	Crawley Town	Exeter
19:45 BST	Simpson (yellow card) 66'; James (yellow card) 81'	Report	Collins (yellow card) 47'; Yorwerth 83'	Stadium: St James Park; Attendance: 2,660; Referee: Lee Collins

20 August 2016 4	Crawley Town	1–1	Barnet	Crawley
15:00 BST	McNerney 67'	Report	Akinde 3'; Watson (yellow card) 53'	Stadium: Broadfield Stadium; Attendance: 1,929; Referee: Lee Probert

27 August 2016 5	Crawley Town	1–3	Notts County	Crawley
15:00 BST	Collins (yellow card) 4'; Boldewijn 47'; McNerney (yellow card) 81'; Young (yellow card) 81'	Report	Collins 54' (og.); Campbell 61'; Dickinson (yellow card) 64'; Oliver (yellow card) 72'; Stead 87' (pen.)	Stadium: Broadfield Stadium; Attendance: 2,087; Referee: John Busby

3 September 2016 6	Portsmouth	3–0	Crawley Town	Portsmouth
15:00 BST	Main 9', 37', (yellow card) 33'; Roberts 12'; Davies (yellow card) 63'	Report	Blackman (yellow card) 30'	Stadium: Fratton Park; Attendance: 16,347; Referee: Ben Toner

10 September 2016 7	Stevenage	2–1	Crawley Town	Stevenage
15:00 BST	Walker 44', (yellow card) 76'; King 55', (yellow card) 73'; Pett (yellow card) 64'	Report	Collins 86', (yellow card) 88'; Payne (yellow card) 90'	Stadium: Broadhall Way; Attendance: 2,157; Referee: Trevor Kettle

17 September 2016 8	Crawley Town	2–0	Luton Town	Crawley
15:00 BST	Djaló (yellow card) 39'; Collins 43'; Banton (yellow card) 65'; Boldewijn 90+3'	Report	Lee (yellow card) 22'; Sheehan (yellow card) 78'	Stadium: Broadfield Stadium; Attendance: 2,904; Referee: Gavin Ward

24 September 2016 9	Morecambe	2–3	Crawley Town	Morecambe
15:00 BST	Barkhuizen (yellow card) 49'; Rose 89'; Stockton 90+3'	Report	Yussuf 72'; Collins 83'; McNerney (yellow card) 88'; Smith 90+1'	Stadium: Globe Arena; Attendance: 1,304; Referee: Chris Sarginson

27 September 2016 10	Crawley Town	1–1	Colchester United	Crawley
19:45 BST	Yussuf 18'; Young (yellow card) 35'; Djaló (yellow card) 84'	Report	Fosu (yellow card) 26'; Porter 88'	Stadium: Broadfield Stadium; Attendance: 1,851; Referee: Andy Haines

1 October 2016 11	Crawley Town	1–0	Blackpool	Crawley
15:00 BST	Connolly (yellow card) 50', (goal) 69'	Report		Stadium: Broadfield Stadium; Attendance: 2,300; Referee: Brett Huxtable

8 October 2016 12	Hartlepool United	1–1	Crawley Town	Hartlepool
15:00 BST	Alessandra 18'; Carroll (yellow card) 73'; Harrison (yellow card) 74'	Report	Blackman (yellow card) 54'; Collins 74' (pen.); Clifford (yellow card) 77'	Stadium: Victoria Park; Attendance: 3,693; Referee: Robert Jones

15 October 2016 13	Cheltenham Town	2–1	Crawley Town	Cheltenham
15:00 BST	Waters 3'; Cranston (yellow card) 45'; Munns 62'; Wright (yellow card) 79'	Report	McNerney (yellow card) 48'; Young (yellow card) 73'; Djaló 78'; Tajbakhsh (yellow card) 81'; Boldewijn (yellow card) 86'	Stadium: Whaddon Road; Attendance: 2,678; Referee: Graham Horwood

22 October 2016 14	Crawley Town	0–0	Accrington Stanley	Crawley
15:00 BST	Djaló (yellow card) 64'; Tajbakhsh (yellow card) 89'	Report	Pearson (yellow card) 45+2'	Stadium: Broadfield Stadium; Attendance: 2,092; Referee: Brendan Malone

29 October 2016 15	Carlisle United	3–1	Crawley Town	Carlisle
15:00 BST	Ibehre 5'; Kennedy 28'; Joyce 45'; Ellis (yellow card) 79'	Report	Davey (yellow card) 66'; Connolly 90+4'	Stadium: Brunton Park; Attendance: 5,619; Referee: Ollie Yates

12 November 2016 16	Crawley Town	1–3	Cambridge United	Crawley
15:00 GMT	Collins 8'; Yussuf (yellow card) 59'; Djaló (yellow card) 60'; Roberts (yellow card) 80'	Report	Taylor 19', (yellow card) 64'; Ikpeazu 28', (yellow card) 83'; Berry 51'; Dunne (yellow card) 90+4'	Stadium: Broadfield Stadium; Attendance: 2,408; Referee: John Busby

19 November 2016 17	Mansfield Town	3–1	Crawley Town	Mansfield
15:00 GMT	Clements 50', 60'; Benning (yellow card) 53'; Hoban 54'	Report	Clifford (yellow card) 37'; Young (yellow card) 45+2'; Davey (yellow card) 55'; Bennett 82' (og.)	Stadium: Field Mill; Attendance: 2,984; Referee: Carl Boyeson

26 November 2016 18	Crawley Town	3–2	Grimsby Town	Crawley
15:00 GMT	Yorwerth (yellow card) 20'; Young (yellow card) 26'; Collins 31'; Roberts 56', 79'; Payne (yellow card) 88'; Boldewijn (yellow card) 90+5'	Report	Bogle 45+2', 90'; Mills (yellow card) 63'	Stadium: Broadfield Stadium; Attendance: 2,315; Referee: Graham Salisbury

3 December 2016 19	Yeovil Town	5–0	Crawley Town	Yeovil
15:00 GMT	Eaves 16'; Hedges 28'; Shephard (yellow card) 38'; Khan 42', 51'; Zoko 73'	Report	Davey (yellow card) 10'; Payne (yellow card) 21'; Tajbakhsh (yellow card) 41'; Roberts (yellow card) 48'	Stadium: Huish Park; Attendance: 2,817; Referee: Charles Breakspear

10 December 2016 20	Crewe Alexandra	0–2	Crawley Town	Crewe
15:00 GMT	Davis (yellow card) 90+4'	Report	Collins 21', 75'	Stadium: Gresty Road; Attendance: 3,392; Referee: David Webb

17 December 2016 21	Crawley Town	3–1	Newport County	Crawley
15:00 GMT	Collins 3'; Blackman (yellow card) 6'; Roberts (yellow card) 26'; Boldewijn (yellow card) 27'; Yorwerth 48'; Connolly (yellow card) 50'; Smith 52'	Report	Labadie (yellow card) 12', (goal) 33'; O'Hanlon (yellow card) 25'; Jones (yellow card) 27'; Bennett (yellow card) 28'; Jackson (yellow card) 37'; Myrie-Williams (yellow card) 48'; Healey (yellow card) 61'; Tozer (yellow card) 66'; Barnum-Bobb (yellow card) 82'	Stadium: Broadfield Stadium; Attendance: 2,022; Referee: Nick Kinseley

26 December 2016 22	Leyton Orient	3–2	Crawley Town	Leyton
13:00 GMT	Dalby 4'; McCallum 11', 45+5' (pen.) (yellow card) 86'; Bowery (yellow card) 75'; Atangana (yellow card) 82'; Hunt (yellow card) 90'	Report	Roberts (yellow card) 45+4'; Mézague 54' (o.g.); Yorwerth (yellow card) 72'; Boldewijn 78'; Young (yellow card) 89'; Collins (yellow card) 90'; Payne (yellow card) 90+1'; Connolly (yellow card) 90+5'	Stadium: Matchroom Stadium; Attendance: 4,486; Referee: Trevor Kettle

31 December 2016 23	Plymouth Argyle	2–0	Crawley Town	Plymouth
15:00 GMT	Miller (yellow card) 35'; Songo'o (yellow card) 44'; Threlkeld 69' (yellow card) 69'; Purrington (yellow card) 75'; Smith (yellow card) 78'; Tanner 90+5'	Report	Roberts (yellow card) 35'; Yorwerth (yellow card) 48'; Connolly (yellow card) 53'; Young (yellow card) 68'; Collins (yellow card) 72'; Smith (yellow card) 84'	Stadium: Home Park; Attendance: 9,039; Referee: Brendan Malone

2 January 2017 24	Crawley Town	2–0	Yeovil Town	Crawley
15:00 GMT	Yorwerth 29', (yellow card) 83'; Collins 38' (pen.); Young (yellow card) 68'; Payne (yellow card) 72'	Report	Mugabi (yellow card) 40'; Zoko (yellow card) 71'; Eaves (yellow card) 73'; Lawless (yellow card) 90+5'	Stadium: Broadfield Stadium; Attendance: 2,304; Referee: John Busby

14 January 2017 25	Crawley Town	1–0	Hartlepool United	Crawley
15:00 GMT	Collins (yellow card) 30', (goal) 63'; Connolly (yellow card) 67'; Young (yellow card) 90+3'	Report	Donnelly (yellow card) 28'; Woods (yellow card) 42'; Laurent (yellow card) 65'; Walker (yellow card) 90+3'	Stadium: Broadfield Stadium; Attendance: 4,266; Referee: Darren Handley

28 January 2017 26	Notts County	2–1	Crawley Town	Nottingham
15:00 GMT	Thompson (yellow card) 30' (yellow-red card) 72'; Audel 75'; Forte 90'	Report	Yorwerth (yellow card) 30'; Young (yellow card) 65'; Connolly (yellow card) 65'; Collins 86'	Stadium: Meadow Lane; Attendance: 5,023; Referee: Nick Kinseley

4 February 2017 27	Crawley Town	1–2	Stevenage	Crawley
15:00 GMT	Collins 28' (pen.), (yellow card) 89'; Yorwerth (yellow card) 45'	Report	Godden 76', 90+5'; Lee (yellow card) 81'; Franks (yellow card) 90+6'	Stadium: Broadfield Stadium; Attendance: 2,124; Referee: Lee Swabey

7 February 2017 28	Blackpool	0–0	Crawley Town	Blackpool
19:45 GMT		Report		Stadium: Bloomfield Road; Attendance: 2,080; Referee: Nigel Miller

11 February 2017 29	Luton Town	2–1	Crawley Town	Luton
15:00 GMT	Hylton 70', 76'; Palmer (yellow card) 90'; Rea (yellow card) 90+7'	Report	Lelan (yellow card) 48'; Collins 60'	Stadium: Kenilworth Road; Attendance: 7,316; Referee: Chris Sarginson

14 February 2017 30	Colchester United	2–3	Crawley Town	Colchester
19:45 GMT	Johnstone 18'; Dickenson 90+3'	Report	Smith 23', 34', 51'	Stadium: Colchester Community Stadium; Attendance: 2,675; Referee: Lee Collins

18 February 2017 31	Crawley Town	1–3	Morecambe	Crawley
15:00 GMT	Collins 77' (pen.); Lelan (yellow card) 87'; Boldewijn (yellow card) 89'	Report	Turner 3'; Mullin (yellow card) 6', (goal) 7', 40'; Evans (yellow card) 52'; Wakefield (yellow card) 76'	Stadium: Broadfield Stadium; Attendance: 2,091; Referee: Charles Breakspear

25 February 2017 32	Wycombe Wanderers	1–2	Crawley Town	High Wycombe
15:00 GMT	Akinfenwa 15' de Havilland (yellow card) 49'; Cowan-Hall (yellow card) 55'; O'Nien (yellow card) 83'; Müller (yellow card) 90+2'	Report	McNerney 43'; Connolly (yellow card) 69'; Payne 84'	Stadium: Adams Park; Attendance: 3,206; Referee: Gavin Ward

28 February 2017 33	Crawley Town	1–2	Exeter City	Crawley
19:45 GMT	Djaló (yellow card) 48'; Connolly 90+1'; Clifford (yellow card) 90+2'	Report	Watkins 50'; Moore-Taylor 68'	Stadium: Broadfield Stadium; Attendance: 1,826; Referee: Dean Whitestone

4 March 2017 34	Crawley Town	0–0	Doncaster Rovers	Crawley
15:00 GMT	McNerney (yellow card) 54'; Smith (yellow card) 55'; Boldewijn (yellow card) 83'	Report	Baudry (yellow card) 63'; Alcock (yellow card) 90+3'	Stadium: Broadfield Stadium; Attendance: 2,417; Referee: Michael Salisbury

7 March 2017 35	Crawley Town	0–2	Portsmouth	Crawley
19:45 GMT	Young (yellow card) 38'	Report	Burgess 54'; Bennett 71'; Hunt (yellow card) 72'; Doyle (yellow card) 90+4'	Stadium: Broadfield Stadium; Attendance: 5,350; Referee: Kevin Johnson

11 March 2017 36	Barnet	2–2	Crawley Town	Canons Park
15:00 GMT	Akinola 39'; Campbell-Ryce 88', (yellow card) 89'	Report	Murphy 31'; Henderson (yellow card) 38'; Boldewijn 54'	Stadium: The Hive Stadium; Attendance: 1,701; Referee: David Webb

14 March 2017 37	Crawley Town	0–3	Crewe Alexandra	Crawley
19:45 GMT	Smith (yellow card) 35'; Yorwerth (yellow card) 82'	Report	Jones 37' (pen.); Bowery 50'; Dagnall 52'; Bakayogo (yellow card) 73'	Stadium: Broadfield Stadium; Attendance: 1,566; Referee: Darren Deadman

18 March 2017 38	Grimsby Town	1–1	Crawley Town	Cleethorpes
15:00 GMT	Jones 22'; Collins (yellow card) 49' (yellow-red card) 81'; Pearson (yellow card) 83'	Report	Collins 45+1'; Payne (yellow card) 80'	Stadium: Blundell Park; Attendance: 4,263; Referee: Carl Boyeson

25 March 2017 39	Crawley Town	3–0	Leyton Orient	Crawley
15:00 GMT	Collins 23'; McNerney 29'; Boldewijn 32'; Clifford (yellow card) 84'	Report	Kelly (yellow card) 28'	Stadium: Broadfield Stadium; Attendance: 2,918; Referee: Trevor Kettle

1 April 2017 40	Newport County	1–0	Crawley Town	Newport
15:00 BST	Demetriou 18' (yellow card) 80'; Labadie (red card) 51'	Report	Djaló (yellow card) 21'; Yorwerth (red card) 51'; Payne (yellow card) 64'; Boldewijn (yellow card) 85'	Stadium: Rodney Parade; Attendance: 2,946; Referee: Darren England

8 April 2017 41	Crawley Town	1–2	Plymouth Argyle	Crawley
15:00 BST	Cox 28'; Collins (yellow card) 60' (yellow-red card) 79'; McNerney (yellow card) 67'	Report	Carey 63' (pen.); Taylor 90+4'	Stadium: Broadfield Stadium; Attendance: 3,432; Referee: Ben Toner

14 April 2017 42	Crawley Town	0–0	Cheltenham Town	Crawley
15:00 BST	Smith (yellow card) 21'; Blackman (yellow card) 26'; Payne (yellow card) 88'	Report	Wright (yellow card) 37'; Davis (yellow card) 42'; Pell (yellow card) 52'; Boyle (yellow card) 82'	Stadium: Broadfield Stadium; Attendance: 2,008; Referee: Charles Breakspear

17 April 2017 43	Accrington Stanley	1–0	Crawley Town	Accrington
15:00 BST	Hughes (yellow card) 40'; McCartan 48'	Report	McNerney (yellow card) 53'	Stadium: Crown Ground; Attendance: 1,652; Referee: David Webb

22 April 2017 44	Crawley Town	3–3	Carlisle United	Crawley
15:00 BST	Collins 12', 25' (pen.); Smith (yellow card) 45+1', (goal) 90+2'; Yorwerth (yellow card) 45+4'	Report	Gillespie (yellow card) 25'; Ibehre 29'; Proctor 42'; Lambe 59', (yellow card) 71'; Bailey (yellow card) 85'	Stadium: Broadfield Stadium; Attendance: 2,003; Referee: Darren Deadman

29 April 2017 45	Cambridge United	2–0	Crawley Town	Cambridge
15:00 BST	Wharton 35'; Legge (yellow card) 45'; McDonagh (yellow card) 62'; Berry 90' (pen.)	Report	Djaló (yellow card) 43'; Blackman (yellow card) 45+1'; Smith (yellow card) 82'; Payne (red card) 89'	Stadium: Abbey Stadium; Attendance: 5,675; Referee: Brett Huxtable

6 May 2017 46	Crawley Town	2–2	Mansfield Town	Crawley
17:30 BST	Cox 34', (yellow card) 57'; Connolly (yellow card) 54'; Roberts 55', (yellow card) 77'	Report	Rose 12'; Whiteman 23'; Pearce (yellow card) 29'; White (yellow card) 57'	Stadium: Broadfield Stadium; Attendance: 2,635; Referee: Carl Boyeson

=== FA Cup ===
Win Draw Loss

5 November 2016 First round	Crawley Town	1–1	Bristol Rovers	Crawley
12:00 GMT	Blackman (yellow card) 19' (yellow-red card) 69'; Smith (yellow card) 32'; Clifford 35'	Report	Brown 15'; Harrison (yellow card) 72'	Stadium: Checkatrade.com Stadium; Attendance: 2,281; Referee: Darren Deadman

15 November 2016 First round replay	Bristol Rovers	4–2 (a.e.t.)	Crawley Town	Bristol
19:45 GMT	Taylor 34', 102' (pen.); Gaffney 52', 96'	Report	Roberts 45+1'; Harrold 65'; Garnett (yellow card) 80'; Collins (yellow card) 114'	Stadium: Memorial Stadium; Attendance: 3,676; Referee: Ben Toner

=== EFL Cup ===
Win Draw Loss

9 August 2016 First round	Wolverhampton Wanderers	2–1	Crawley Town	Wolverhampton
19:45 BST	Mason 7'; Teixeira (yellow card) 57'; Coady 76'	Report	Connolly (yellow card) 2' (yellow-red card) 89'; Boldewijn 13'	Stadium: Molineux Stadium; Attendance: 8,252; Referee: Ross Joyce

=== EFL Trophy ===
==== Group stage ====
Pos	Div	Team	Pld	W	PW	PL	L	GF	GA	GD	Pts	Qualification
1	ACA	Southampton U21	3	2	0	1	0	6	1	+5	7	Advance to Round 2
2	L2	Crawley Town	3	2	0	0	1	3	4	−1	6	Advance to Round 2
3	L1	Charlton Athletic	3	0	1	1	1	1	3	−2	3	
4	L2	Colchester United	3	0	1	0	2	2	4	−2	2	

Source: Sky Sports

30 August 2016 1	Crawley Town	1–0	Colchester United	Crawley
19:45 BST	Collins 34'; Tajbakhsh (yellow card) 74'; Yorwerth (yellow card) 75'		Szmodics (yellow card) 50'; Bonne (yellow card) 54'; Kinsella (yellow card) 60'	Stadium: Broadfield Stadium; Attendance: 881; Referee: Tim Robinson

4 October 2016 2	Charlton Athletic	0–2	Crawley Town	Charlton
19:45 BST		Report	Yussuf 44'; Collins 50'	Stadium: The Valley; Attendance: 1,186; Referee: James Linington

9 November 2016 3	Southampton U23	4–0	Crawley Town	Southampton
19:45 GMT	Mersin 3' (og.); Mdlalose 9'; Slattery 34', (yellow card) 58'; Olomola 78'	Report	Djaló (yellow card) 50'	Stadium: St Mary's Stadium; Attendance: 495; Referee: Keith Stroud

==== Knockout phase ====
7 December 2016 Second round	Coventry City	1–0	Crawley Town	Coventry
19:45 GMT	Sordell 28'; Turnbull (yellow card) 45'	Report		Stadium: Ricoh Arena; Attendance: 1,338; Referee: Graham Horwood

=== Sussex Senior Cup ===
29 November 2016 Second round	Langney Wanderers	1–3	Crawley Town	Eastbourne
19:45 GMT	58' (pen.)	Report	Henderson 5', 28'; Boldewijn 8'	Stadium: The Oval; Referee: Matthew Goldsmith

13 December 2016 Third round	Horsham YMCA	0–3	Crawley Town	Horsham
19:45 GMT		Report	Yussuf 36'; Henderson 44'; Watt 65'	Stadium: Gorings Mead; Referee: Jacob Miles

10 January 2017 Quarter final	Crawley Town	3–1	Whitehawk	Crawley
19:45 GMT	Henderson 4'; Bawling 12', 26'	Report	Lisbie 3'	Stadium: Broadfield Stadium; Attendance: 390; Referee: Marc Meeten

21 February 2017 Semi final	Bognor Regis Town	2–3 (a.e.t.)	Crawley Town	Lancing
19:15 GMT	El-Abd 27'; Pearce 90'	Report	Young 8'; Bawling 78'; Boldewijn 119'	Stadium: Culver Road; Attendance: 507; Referee: Marc Meeten

3 May 2017 Final	Brighton & Hove Albion	3–0 (a.e.t.)	Crawley Town	Brighton
19:45 BST	Hutchinson (yellow card) 67'; Tilley 96'; Towell 111'; Ward 114'	Report	Roberts (yellow card) 65'	Stadium: Falmer Stadium; Attendance: 1,316; Referee: Jacob Miles

== Statistics ==
=== Appearances ===
No.	Pos.	Name	League Two		FA Cup		EFL Cup		EFL Trophy		Total		Discipline	
No.	Pos.	Name	Apps	Goals	Apps	Goals	Apps	Goals	Apps	Goals	Apps	Goals	Yellow card	Red card
2	DF	(England) Lewis Young	42 (1)	0	2	0	1	0	3	0	48 (1)	0	11	0
3	DF	(England) Chris Arthur	3 (3)	0	1	0	1	0	4	0	9 (3)	0	0	0
4	MF	(England) Josh Payne	23 (9)	1	0	0	1	0	0	0	24 (9)	1	8	1
6	DF	(Republic of Ireland) Mark Connolly	40 (1)	3	1	0	1	0	3	0	45 (1)	3	9	1
7	MF	(Netherlands) Enzio Boldewijn	43 (3)	5	1 (1)	0	1	1	1 (2)	0	46 (6)	6	6	0
8	MF	(England) Jimmy Smith	46	7	2	0	1	0	0 (1)	0	49 (1)	7	8	0
9	FW	(England) Matt Harrold	1 (10)	0	0 (2)	1	0 (1)	0	0 (1)	0	1 (14)	1	1	0
11	MF	(England) Jordan Roberts	14 (9)	3	1	1	1	0	0 (1)	0	16 (10)	4	6	0
12	GK	(England) Glenn Morris	39	0	2	0	0	0	0	0	41	0	0	0
13	GK	(Turkey) Yusuf Mersin	6 (2)	0	0	0	1	0	1	0	8 (2)	0	0	0
14	DF	(England) Andre Blackman	31 (1)	0	1	0	0	0	1 (1)	0	33 (2)	0	8	2
15	DF	(Wales) Josh Yorwerth	14 (7)	3	0	0	0	0	2	0	16 (7)	3	8	1
16	DF	(England) Addison Garnett	1 (1)	0	1	0	0	0	0 (1)	0	2 (2)	0	1	0
17	MF	(England) Bobson Bawling	1 (27)	0	1	0	0 (1)	0	3	0	4 (28)	0	0	0
18	MF	(England) Billy Clifford	26 (10)	0	2	1	0	0	3 (1)	0	31 (11)	1	4	0
19	FW	(Republic of Ireland) James Collins	45	20	2	0	1	0	2 (1)	2	50 (1)	22	9	1
20	MF	(England) Aryan Tajbakhsh	2 (2)	0	0 (1)	0	0	0	4	0	6 (3)	0	4	0
22	DF	(England) Joe McNerney	33 (1)	3	0	0	1	0	0	0	34 (1)	3	6	0
24	MF	(Guinea-Bissau) Kaby Djaló	24 (4)	1	2	0	0	0	3	0	29 (4)	1	8	0
25	DF	(Kenya) Josh Lelan	10 (3)	0	0	0	0	0	0	0	10 (3)	0	2	0
28	MF	(England) Dean Cox	20 (2)	2	0	0	0	0	0	0	20 (2)	2	1	0
39	FW	(Republic of Ireland) Rhys Murphy	7 (8)	1	0	0	0	0	0	0	7 (8)	1	0	0
44	MF	(Republic of Ireland) Conor Henderson	8 (4)	0	0 (1)	0	0	0	0 (1)	0	8 (6)	0	1	0
Players who left the club in August/January transfer window or on loan
1	GK	(England) Mitchell Beeney	1	0	0	0	0	0	3	0	4	0	0	0
5	DF	(Scotland) Alex Davey	8 (6)	0	2	0	0	0	2	0	12 (6)	0	4	0
10	MF	(England) Jason Banton	11 (3)	0	0	0	1	0	3 (1)	0	15 (4)	0	2	0
21	FW	(Tanzania) Adi Yussuf	6 (10)	2	1 (1)	0	0 (1)	0	4	1	11 (12)	3	1	0
23	DF	(Ghana) Daniel Pappoe	0	0	0	0	0	0	1 (1)	0	1 (1)	0	0	0
33	MF	(England) Sanchez Watt	0 (2)	0	0	0	0	0	1	0	1 (2)	0	0	0

Last updated: 6 May 2017.
Source: Crawley Town F.C.

=== Top scorers ===
The list is sorted by shirt number when total goals are equal.

Rnk	Pos	No.	Player	League Two	FA Cup	EFL Cup	EFL Trophy	Total
1	FW	19	(Republic of Ireland) James Collins	20	0	0	2	22
2	MF	8	(England) Jimmy Smith	7	0	0	0	7
3	MF	7	(Netherlands) Enzio Boldewijn	5	0	1	0	6
4	MF	11	(England) Jordan Roberts	3	1	0	0	4
5	DF	6	(Republic of Ireland) Mark Connolly	3	0	0	0	3
5	DF	15	(Wales) Josh Yorwerth	3	0	0	0	3
5	FW	21	(Tanzania) Adi Yussuf	2	0	0	1	3
5	DF	22	(England) Joe McNerney	3	0	0	0	3
9	MF	28	(England) Dean Cox	2	0	0	0	2
10	MF	4	(England) Josh Payne	1	0	0	0	1
10	FW	9	(England) Matt Harrold	0	1	0	0	1
10	MF	18	(England) Billy Clifford	0	1	0	0	1
10	MF	24	(Guinea-Bissau) Kaby Djaló	1	0	0	0	1
10	FW	39	(Republic of Ireland) Rhys Murphy	1	0	0	0	1
Own goals				2	0	0	0	2
Total				53	3	1	3	60

Last updated: 6 May 2017.
Source: Crawley Town F.C.

=== Clean sheets ===
The list is sorted by shirt number when total appearances are equal.

Rnk	No.	Player	League Two	FA Cup	EFL Cup	EFL Trophy	Total
1	12	(England) Glenn Morris	10	0	0	0	10
2	1	(England) Mitchell Beeney	0	0	0	2	2
2	13	(Turkey) Yusuf Mersin	2	0	0	0	2
Total			12	0	0	2	14

Last updated: 14 April 2017.
Source: Crawley Town F.C.

=== Summary ===
Games played	53 (46 League Two) (2 FA Cup) (1 EFL Cup) (4 EFL Trophy)
Games won	15 (13 League Two) (2 EFL Trophy)
Games drawn	13 (12 League Two) (1 FA Cup)
Games lost	25 (21 League Two) (1 FA Cup) (1 EFL Cup) (2 EFL Trophy)
Goals scored	60 (53 League Two) (3 FA Cup) (1 EFL Cup) (3 EFL Trophy)
Goals conceded	83 (71 League Two) (5 FA Cup) (2 EFL Cup) (5 EFL Trophy)
Goal difference	–23 (–18 League Two) (–2 FA Cup) (–1 EFL Cup) (–2 EFL Trophy)
Clean sheets	14 (12 League Two) (2 EFL Trophy)
Yellow cards	110 (102 League Two) (4 FA Cup) (1 EFL Cup) (3 EFL Trophy)
Red cards	6 (4 League Two) (1 FA Cup) (1 EFL Cup)
Most appearances	(Netherlands) Enzio Boldewijn (52 appearances)
Top scorer	(Republic of Ireland) James Collins (22 goals)
Winning Percentage	Overall: 15/53 (28.30%)

Last updated: 6 May 2017.
Source: Crawley Town F.C.
