= Andre Blackman =

English footballer (born 1990)

Personal information
- Full name: Andre Alexander-George Blackman
- Date of birth: 10 November 1990 (age 36)
- Place of birth: Lambeth, England
- Height: 5 ft 11 in (1.80 m)
- Positions: Left back; left winger

Youth career
- 2001–2006: Arsenal
- 2006–2007: Tottenham Hotspur
- 2007–2009: Portsmouth

Senior career*
Years	Team	Apps	(Gls)
2009–2010	Bristol City	0	(0)
2010–2011	AFC Wimbledon	13	(0)
2011–2012	Celtic	3	(0)
2012	→ Inverness Caledonian Thistle (loan)	2	(0)
2013–2014	Plymouth Argyle	6	(0)
2014	Dover Athletic	0	(0)
2014	Maidenhead United	2	(0)
2014–2015	Blackpool	3	(0)
2016	MAS Fez	3	(0)
2016–2017	Crawley Town	32	(0)
2017–2018	Barnet	19	(0)
2019	Southend United	3	(0)
2019–2020	Ebbsfleet United	14	(0)
2020–2023	Dulwich Hamlet	43	(2)
- * Club domestic league appearances and goals as of 18:14, 18 September 2022 (UTC)

Andre Alexander-George Blackman (born 10 November 1990) is an English footballer who last played for Dulwich Hamlet.

A left back, he can also play as a left winger.

== Early life ==
Blackman was born in Lambeth, London.

== Career ==
=== Early career ===
Blackman began his career at Afewee Academy in Brixton before joining as a trainee with Arsenal, moving to Tottenham Hotspur and then signing for Portsmouth at the age of 16. He also had spells with Chelsea, and West Ham.

=== Bristol City ===
Blackman started his professional career by signing a two-year contract with Bristol City after his release by Portsmouth.

Blackman made his debut for Bristol City in the League Cup match against Brentford on 11 August 2009. On 1 October 2009, he was released by Bristol City over a disciplinary matter, without making a league appearance. He then went on trial with Championship side Leicester City, which proved to be unsuccessful.

=== AFC Wimbledon ===
After declaring he wanted to "sort his life out", Blackman signed for Conference National club AFC Wimbledon on 1 June 2010, and made his debut in their 1–0 away win against Southport on 14 August; however, after a handful of appearances, Blackman was declared surplus to requirements and was replaced by Chris Bush, and subsequently Gareth Gwillim. Blackman featured in 18 League, Cup and friendly matches scoring twice, including one against an Arsenal XI – his former club.

On 12 January 2011, Blackman went on trial with Oldham Athletic, but was not signed. On 9 February 2011, it was announced that Blackman had joined an unnamed league club on trial.

=== Celtic ===
In October 2011, Blackman had a trial with Scottish Premier League side Celtic, playing his first match in a year when Celtic's development squad played a bounce game against a Rangers XI. This trial resulted in Blackman signing for Celtic in November 2011. He made his debut for Celtic on 3 March, in a 1–1 draw with Aberdeen. Although not featured enough at Celtic, the club won their first title in over four years.

Blackman thanked Neil Lennon for saving his football career after a troubled year and admitted he had to show humility and mental strength to make a breakthrough. At the end of the season, Blackman was awarded 'Tackle of the Year' at Celtic when a video was shown of Blackman accidentally tackling the manager Lennon as he skidding toward him during a match, sending him crashing to the turf.

Blackman was loaned to Inverness Caledonian Thistle for the first part of the 2012–13 season in order to get more first team experience. On 15 September 2012, he made his debut for the club in a 1–1 draw against Aberdeen where he made impressive debut, resulting him earning a man of the match. His loan spell was terminated by Inverness CT, however, three months early. Manager Terry Butcher revealed he terminated Blackman loan spell because of his poor attitude and discipline.

He was released by Celtic in November 2012, just one year after signing for the club.

=== Plymouth Argyle ===
Blackman signed a six-month contract with Plymouth Argyle in July 2013. He made his debut in the club's first game of the new season at Southend United, and also started in the next two matches before losing his place in the team. Blackman scored the first goal of his career in a Football League Trophy tie against Swindon Town, but he remained on the fringes of the team and made his ninth and final appearance for the club in October. He was released when his contract expired in January 2014.

=== Non league spells ===
In March 2014, Blackman joined Conference South club Dover Athletic on non-contract terms and scored on his debut against Dartford in the Kent Senior Cup.

Shortly after his move to Dover Athletic, Blackman joined Conference South side Maidenhead United.

=== Trial with Leeds ===
On 23 May 2014, Blackman was strongly linked with a move to Leeds United, after Leeds owner Massimo Cellino showed an interest in reviving his career. On 28 June 2014, he was pictured with the Leeds United first team squad at the launch of the Leeds 2014–15 shirt at Elland Road. On 30 June 2014, he travelled with Leeds on their two-week pre-season training camp to Santa Cristina in Italy, with Leeds officially announcing Blackman had joined them on trial. After a trial spell, Leeds decided not to take up the option to sign Blackman.

=== Blackpool ===
On 29 September, Blackman joined Blackpool on a one-year contract with the option of a further year. He started against the club he had a trial at in the summer, Leeds United in a 3–1 loss.

=== Crawley Town ===
On 19 July 2016, Blackman joined League Two side Crawley Town on a one-year deal after a short spell with Moroccan side MAS Fez.

=== Barnet ===
Blackman joined Barnet on 26 August 2017. He scored his first goal for Barnet on his debut in an EFL Trophy tie against former club AFC Wimbledon on 29 August 2017. He was released by Barnet at the end of the 2017–18 season.

=== Later career ===
On 11 September 2018, he made a competitive appearance for Gillingham, as a trialist in the Kent Senior Cup. Blackman went on trial with Southend United in July 2019. He joined the Shrimpers on a "monthly multiplicity contract" on 2 August. He later played for Ebbsfleet United that season, before joining Dulwich Hamlet in November 2020.

== Career statistics ==
As of match played 9 October 2021.

Appearances and goals by club, season and competition
Club	Season	League			National Cup		League Cup		Other		Total	
Club	Season	Division	Apps	Goals	Apps	Goals	Apps	Goals	Apps	Goals	Apps	Goals
Bristol City	2009–10	Championship	0	0	0	0	2	0	—		2	0
AFC Wimbledon	2010–11	Conference Premier	13	0	3	0	—		0	0	16	0
Celtic	2011–12	Scottish Premier League	3	0	0	0	0	0	0	0	3	0
Inverness Caledonian Thistle (loan)	2012–13	Scottish Premier League	2	0	0	0	0	0	—		2	0
Plymouth Argyle	2013–14	League Two	6	0	0	0	1	0	2 (Note: Appearance(s) in Football League Trophy)	1	9	1
Maidenhead United	2013–14	Conference South	2	0	0	0	—		0	0	2	0
Blackpool	2014–15	Championship	3	0	0	0	0	0	—		3	0
MAS Fez	2015–16	Botola	3	0	0	0	—		—		3	0
Crawley Town	2016–17	League Two	32	0	1	0	0	0	2 (Note: Appearance(s) in EFL Trophy)	0	35	0
Crawley Town	2017–18	League Two	0	0	0	0	1	0	0	0	1	0
Crawley Town	Total		32	0	1	0	1	0	2	0	36	0
Barnet	2017–18	League Two	19	0	0	0	0	0	2	1	21	1
Southend United	2019–20	League One	3	0	0	0	2	0	2	0	7	0
Ebbsfleet United	2019–20	National League	14	0	2	0	0	0	2 (Note: Appearance(s) in FA Trophy)	0	18	0
Dulwich Hamlet	2020–21	National League South	3	1	0	0	0	0	0	0	3	1
Dulwich Hamlet	2021–22	National League South	5	0	1	0	0	0	0	0	6	0
Dulwich Hamlet	Total		8	1	1	0	0	0	0	0	9	1
Career total			108	1	7	0	6	0	10	2	131	3
