= Aryan Tajbakhsh =

English footballer

Personal information
- Full name: Aryantaj Tajbakhsh
- Date of birth: 20 October 1990 (age 36)
- Place of birth: Hendon, England
- Height: 6 ft 1 in (1.85 m)
- Position: Midfielder

Youth career
- Kentish Town

Senior career*
Years	Team	Apps	(Gls)
2007–2008	Northwood	6	(0)
2008	Barnet	0	(0)
2008–2009	Potters Bar Town		
2009–2010	Maidenhead United	6	(0)
2010–2011	Antalyaspor	0	(0)
2010–2011	→ Yalovaspor (loan)	16	(0)
2011	Pendikspor		
2011	Braintree Town	0	(0)
2011–2012	Billericay Town		
2012	Harrow Borough		
2012	Farnborough		
2012	Maidenhead United		
2012	Walton & Hersham		
2013	Potters Bar Town		
2013	St Albans City	5	(0)
2013–2014	Aveley	12	(1)
2014	Cheshunt	15	(2)
2014	Ware	8	(1)
2014–2015	VCD Athletic	5	(0)
2015	Enfield Town	16	(1)
2015	Hendon	1	(0)
2015–2016	Cray Wanderers	27	(5)
2016–2018	Crawley Town	21	(0)
2017	→ Wealdstone (loan)	11	(2)
2018	Dover Athletic	7	(0)
2018–2019	Maidstone United	12	(0)
2019	Dulwich Hamlet	11	(1)
2020–2021	St. Panteleimon	7	(0)
2021–2022	Potters Bar Town	18	(0)
2022–2023	Kings Langley	21	(1)
2023	FC Romania	4	(0)
2024	Egham Town	1	(0)
2024	Ashford Town (Middlesex)	2	(0)

International career
2018	Barawa	5	(1)
- * Club domestic league appearances and goals as of 14:13, 19 January 2026 (UTC)

Aryantaj Tajbakhsh (born 20 October 1990) is an English footballer who plays as a midfielder.

== Club career ==
Tajbakhsh, who was known as Aryan Taj early in his career, was in the youth team at Kentish Town before joining Northwood. He signed for Barnet at the start of the 2008–09 season and appeared on the bench for first team games, but did not play. Later that season he played for Potters Bar Town and Maidenhead United, before moving to Turkey to play for Antalyaspor in the Süper Lig. Tajbakhsh never played for the first team, but he did play 12 times for the reserves in A2 Ligi, before a spell on loan at Yalovaspor (TFF Third League) and then Pendikspor (TFF Second League). Tajbakhsh then played for Braintree Town, Billericay Town, Harrow Borough, Farnborough, Maidenhead United, Walton & Hersham, Potters Bar Town, St Albans City, Aveley, Cheshunt, Ware, VCD Athletic, Enfield Town, Hendon and Cray Wanderers. While at Enfield Town, Tajbakhsh played in matches while suspended, leading to a three-point deduction for Town which led them to miss out on the Isthmian League playoffs in 2014–15, despite Town identifying that Aryan's former clubs had not correctly reported his personal details when informing the FA of bookings incurred when he was playing for them.

Tajbakhsh joined Crawley Town on 12 July 2016, and made his professional debut for Crawley on 30 August 2016, in an EFL Trophy match against Colchester United. On 17 February 2017, Tajbakhsh joined National League South side Wealdstone on a 28-day loan. A day later, he scored on his Wealdstone debut in their 1–0 victory over Margate, netting in the 45th minute. On 17 March 2017, his loan spell at Wealdstone was extended for a further month. Tajbakhsh left Crawley at the end of his contract in June 2018. He rejoined Braintree on trial in July 2018, scoring twice in a pre-season win over Ipswich Town. He signed for Dover Athletic in August 2018. He moved to Maidstone United in November 2018, and to Dulwich Hamlet in February 2019. Tajbakhsh joined Potters Bar Town in August 2021, before joining Kings Langley in February 2022. In August 2023, Tajbakhsh agreed terms with Spartan South Midlands League Premier Division club FC Romania, making his debut for the Wolves in an FA Cup First Round Qualifying tie as a 45th minute sub in a 5-2 victory away to Colney Heath.

== International career ==
Tajbakhsh was called up to the Barawa football team for the 2018 ConIFA World Football Cup.

== Personal life ==
Tajbakhsh is of Turkish and Iranian descent. His brother Noyan (born 1996) is also a footballer and was in the youth team at Fenerbahçe.

== Career statistics ==
As of 19 February 2022

Appearances and goals by club, season and competition
Club	Season	League			FA Cup		League Cup		Other		Total	
Club	Season	Division	Apps	Goals	Apps	Goals	Apps	Goals	Apps	Goals	Apps	Goals
Northwood	2007–08	Isthmian League Division One North	1	0	0	0	—		0	0	1	0
Northwood	2008–09	Isthmian League Division One North	5	0	0	0	—		0	0	5	0
Northwood	Total		6	0	0	0	—		0	0	6	0
Barnet	2008–09	League Two	0	0	0	0	0	0	1	0	1	0
Maidenhead United	2009–10	Conference South	6	0	1	0	—		2	0	9	0
Yalovaspor (loan)	2010–11	TFF Third League	16	0	0	0	—		0	0	16	0
St Albans City	2013–14	Southern League Premier Division	5	0	0	0	—		0	0	5	0
Aveley	2013–14	Isthmian League Division One North	12	1	0	0	—		2	0	14	1
Ware	2013–14	Isthmian League Division One North	8	1	0	0	—		0	0	8	1
VCD Athletic	2014–15	Isthmian League Premier Division	5	0	0	0	—		0	0	5	0
Enfield Town	2014–15	Isthmian League Premier Division	12	1	0	0	—		0	0	12	1
Enfield Town	2015–16	Isthmian League Premier Division	4	0	0	0	—		1	0	5	0
Enfield Town	Total		16	1	0	0	—		1	0	17	1
Hendon	2015–16	Isthmian League Premier Division	1	0	1	0	—		0	0	2	0
Cray Wanderers	2015–16	Isthmian League Division One North	27	5	0	0	—		1	0	28	5
Crawley Town	2016–17	League Two	4	0	1	0	0	0	4	0	9	0
Crawley Town	2017–18	League Two	17	0	1	0	1	0	3	0	22	0
Crawley Town	Total		21	0	2	0	1	0	7	0	31	0
Wealdstone (loan)	2016–17	National League South	11	2	0	0	—		0	0	11	2
Dover Athletic	2018–19	National League	7	0	0	0	—		0	0	7	0
Maidstone United	2018–19	National League	12	0	2	0	—		6	0	19	0
Dulwich Hamlet	2018–19	National League South	11	1	0	0	—		0	0	11	1
Potters Bar Town	2021–22	Isthmian League Premier Division	18	0	1	0	—		3	0	22	0
Kings Langley	2021–22	SFL Premier Division South	1	0	0	0	—		0	0	1	0
Career total			191	12	8	0	1	0	25	1	224	13
