= Mark Connolly =

Irish footballer (born 1991)

Personal information
- Full name: Mark Gerard Connolly
- Date of birth: 16 December 1991 (age 34)
- Place of birth: Clones, Ireland
- Height: 6 ft 1 in (1.85 m)
- Position: Defender

Team information
- Current team: Derry City (Director of Football)

Youth career
- Monaghan United
- –2009: Wolverhampton Wanderers
- 2009–2010: Bolton Wanderers

Senior career*
Years	Team	Apps	(Gls)
2010–2012	Bolton Wanderers	0	(0)
2010	→ St Johnstone (loan)	1	(0)
2012	→ Macclesfield Town (loan)	7	(0)
2012–2014	Crawley Town	69	(3)
2014–2016	Kilmarnock	36	(4)
2016–2019	Crawley Town	104	(5)
2019–2022	Dundee United	54	(1)
2021–2022	→ Dunfermline Athletic (loan)	14	(1)
2022	→ Dundalk (loan)	20	(1)
2022–2025	Derry City	94	(2)
2026	Coleraine	15	(1)
Total		412	(18)

International career^{‡}
2007–2008	Republic of Ireland U17	12	(1)
2008–2009	Republic of Ireland U19	5	(0)
2011	Republic of Ireland U21	7	(0)

Managerial career
- 2026–: Derry City (Director of Football)
- 2026–: Derry City (interim)
- * Club domestic league appearances and goals as of 5 August 2026 ‡ National team caps and goals as of 27 January 2018 (UTC)

Mark Gerard Connolly (born 16 December 1991) is an Irish retired footballer who played for Bolton Wanderers, St Johnstone, Macclesfield Town, Crawley Town, Kilmarnock, Dundee United, Dunfermline Athletic, Dundalk, Derry City and Coleraine during his career. Connolly also represented the Republic of Ireland at under-21 level.

== Club career ==
=== Bolton Wanderers ===
Connolly was signed from Wolverhampton Wanderers by Bolton Wanderers on the summer transfer deadline in 2009 after the clubs agreed a £1,000,000 fee. Wolves later reported Bolton and their assistant manager Chris Evans, a former academy director at Wolves, for an illegal approach for the player. Connolly later stated he was unaware of the transfer fee Bolton had paid.

On the January transfer deadline day of 2010, Connolly signed on loan for St Johnstone until the end of the season. He made his debut on 27 March 2010 in the loss to Hamilton Academical.

During the 2011–12 season, Connolly was captain of Bolton Wanderers's reserve team and was on the substitutes bench for the first team in their League Cup win against Macclesfield Town and he then joined Macclesfield on 24 February 2012, on a months loan, making his debut the following day in their 1–1 draw at Oxford United.

On 15 May 2012, Connolly confirmed on his Twitter account that he had left Bolton. This was followed by confirmation from the club that Connolly was one of twelve players released following the club's relegation to the Championship.

=== Crawley Town ===
On 9 July 2012, Crawley Town announced that Connolly had signed for them on a two-year contract. Connolly later stated he joined Crawley because he wanted the chance to play first team football. Connolly made his debut on 14 August, starting in a League Cup match as a right-back against Championship side Millwall which ended 2–2, with Crawley winning 4–1 on penalties. He then made his league debut for Crawley, in the opening game of the season, in a 3–0 win over Scunthorpe United. In late August 2012, Connolly was part of the Crawley team which successfully defeated Bolton in the League Cup thanks to a last minute goal by Nicky Ajose. In November 2012, after an earlier spell out of the side, Connolly spoke of his enjoyment at getting back in the team and playing regular first team games. On 1 January 2013, he scored his first Crawley Town goal in the 5th minute, in a 3–0 win over Colchester United. In a home match against Brentford on 26 February 2013, Connolly gave away a penalty and received a red card after 50 seconds, with Crawley going on to lose 2–1. He returned after being on the bench for five matches against Crewe on 26 March 2013. Connolly's second goal for the club came on 20 April 2013, in a 2–1 loss against Oldham Athletic. In his first season at Crawley Town, Connolly scored twice in 35 appearances for the club.

In his second season, Connolly remained at the club after being linked with a move to Championship clubs following his performances during the previous season. He spent most of the first half of the season on the bench before regaining his first team place. Connolly then scored his first goal of the season, with a header, in a 1–0 win over Notts County on 29 December 2013. He went on to make 40 appearances in all competitions. Despite the club starting negotiations over a new contract, Connolly was among 11 players released at the end of the 2013–14 season.

=== Kilmarnock ===
Connolly signed a three-year contract with Scottish club Kilmarnock in July 2014. He made his debut on 9 August 2014, in a 1–1 draw with Dundee Connolly then scored his first Kilmarnock goal from a header and earlier set up a goal for Robbie Muirhead, in a 2–1 win over St Mirren A few weeks later on 3 October 2014, he scored his second goal of the season, in a 2–0 win over Dundee United. On 22 February 2015, Connolly was injured during Kilmarnock's 3–3 draw against Inverness Caledonian Thistle and it was later confirmed he had broken his collarbone with the injury expected to keep him out for the remainder of the season. He returned from injury earlier than expected against Motherwell on 8 May 2015.

Ahead of the 2015–16 season Connolly was named as captain of Kilmarnock, replacing Manuel Pascali who had left the club earlier in the summer. On 23 May 2016, he had his contract cancelled.

=== Return to Crawley Town ===
On 2 July 2016, Connolly re-joined Crawley Town preceding his contract expiry from Kilmarnock. On 6 August 2016, he made his Crawley return in a 1–0 victory against Wycombe Wanderers, playing the full 90 minutes. On 1 October 2016, Connolly scored the winner in Crawley's 1–0 victory over Blackpool, netting in the 69th minute.

On 4 August 2017, he signed a new three-year deal with Crawley.

=== Dundee United ===
On 31 January 2019, Connolly signed for Dundee United of the Scottish Championship for an undisclosed fee, on a two-and-a-half-year contract. He scored his first goal for the club on 4 January 2020, the only goal of their away match against Queen of the South, in what was his first appearance in the starting lineup since the previous August. He was part of the United team that were 14 points clear at the top of the Championship table when the 2019–20 season was curtailed due to the COVID-19 pandemic; they were subsequently declared champions and promoted to the Premiership. In August 2020 he extended his contract with the club until 2023. The following month, he was charged with "not acting in the best interests of football" and breaching COVID regulations, when he allegedly refused to wear a face mask in a taxi. He was subsequently given a suspended two-match ban at a Scottish Football Association disciplinary hearing. In May 2021, Connolly snapped his cruciate ligament in a Premiership match against Motherwell, and was expected to be out injured for several months.

Connolly was loaned to Dunfermline Athletic in September 2021. He departed the club in January 2022 after playing every minute of his 14 appearances for the club, scoring 1 goal.

On 17 January 2022, Connolly returned to his home country, signing for League of Ireland Premier Division club Dundalk on a six-month loan deal. Dundalk confirmed on 22 July 2022 that Connolly had been recalled by Dundee United following his loan spell.

=== Derry City ===
After ending his loan spell at Dundalk, Dundee United sold Connolly to Derry City on 28 July 2022 for an undisclosed fee. On 13 November 2022, he was part of the starting 11 in the 2022 FAI Cup final as his side defeated Shelbourne by a record cup final score of 4–0 at the Aviva Stadium. On 12 November 2025, it was announced that Connolly would be leaving the club at the end of his contract, having captained the club during his three and a half years at the club, scoring 4 goals in 114 appearances in all competitions.

=== Coleraine ===
On 10 December 2025, it was announced that Connolly had signed a pre-contract agreement with NIFL Premiership club Coleraine, joining on 1 January 2026. He scored 1 goal in 20 appearances in all competitions for the club and was part of the squad that won the 2025–26 Irish Cup before retiring at the end of the season.

== Post-playing career ==
On 11 June 2026, Connolly was announced as Director of Football at his former club Derry City. On 5 August 2026, upon the sacking of manager Tiernan Lynch, Connolly was announced as interim manager of the club. In his first game in charge, he led the side to a 2–0 victory over Sligo Rovers, describing the experience of managing the club as "an absolute honour". On 8 November 2026, he led his side to a 1–0 win over Waterford in the 2026 FAI Cup final at the Aviva Stadium.

== Career statistics ==
=== Playing statistics ===
As of match played on 25 April 2026

Appearances and goals by club, season and competition
Club	Season	League			National Cup (Note: Includes FA Cup, Scottish Cup, FAI Cup & Irish Cup)		League Cup (Note: Includes EFL Cup, Scottish League Cup & Northern Ireland Football League Cup)		Other		Total	
Club	Season	Division	Apps	Goals	Apps	Goals	Apps	Goals	Apps	Goals	Apps	Goals
Bolton Wanderers	2009–10	Premier League	0	0	0	0	0	0	–		0	0
Bolton Wanderers	2010–11	Premier League	0	0	0	0	0	0	–		0	0
Bolton Wanderers	2011–12	Premier League	0	0	0	0	0	0	–		0	0
Bolton Wanderers	Total		0	0	0	0	0	0	–		0	0
St Johnstone (loan)	2009–10	Scottish Premier League	1	0	0	0	0	0	–		1	0
Macclesfield Town (loan)	2011–12	League Two	7	0	–		–		–		7	0
Crawley Town	2012–13	League One	33	2	3	0	2	0	2 (Note: Appearances in the Football League Trophy)	0	40	2
Crawley Town	2013–14	League One	36	1	3	0	0	0	1	0	40	1
Crawley Town	Total		69	3	6	0	2	0	3	0	80	3
Kilmarnock	2014–15	Scottish Premiership	26	2	1	0	2	0	–		29	2
Kilmarnock	2015–16	Scottish Premiership	10	2	0	0	0	0	–		10	2
Kilmarnock	Total		36	4	1	0	2	0	–		39	4
Crawley Town	2016–17	League Two	41	3	1	0	1	0	3 (Note: Appearances in the EFL Trophy)	0	46	3
Crawley Town	2017–18	League Two	40	2	1	0	0	0	0	0	41	2
Crawley Town	2018–19	League Two	23	0	2	0	1	1	0	0	26	1
Crawley Town	Total		104	5	4	0	2	1	3	0	113	6
Dundee United	2018–19	Scottish Championship	9	0	2	0	0	0	4 (Note: Appearances in the Scottish Premiership play-offs)	0	15	0
Dundee United	2019–20	Scottish Championship	17	1	2	0	3	0	0	0	22	1
Dundee United	2020–21	Scottish Premiership	25	0	0	0	4	0	–		29	0
Dundee United	2021–22	Scottish Premiership	1	0	–		0	0	–		1	0
Dundee United	Total		52	1	4	0	7	0	4	0	67	1
Dunfermline Athletic (loan)	2021–22	Scottish Championship	14	1	1	0	–		–		15	1
Dundalk (loan)	2022	LOI Premier Division	20	1	–		–		–		20	1
Derry City	2022	LOI Premier Division	11	0	5	1	–		–		16	1
Derry City	2023	LOI Premier Division	16	0	1	0	–		7 (Note: 5 appearances in the UEFA Europa Conference League & 1 appearance in the President of Ireland's Cup)	0	24	0
Derry City	2024	LOI Premier Division	32	1	4	0	–		2	1	38	2
Derry City	2025	LOI Premier Division	35	1	2	0	–		–		37	1
Derry City	Total		94	2	12	1	–		9	1	115	4
Coleraine	2025–26	NIFL Premiership	15	1	4	1	1	0	–		20	1
Career total			412	18	31	2	14	1	18	1	477	21

=== Managerial statistics ===
As of 8 November 2026

Managerial record by team and tenure
Team	From	To	Record							
Team	From	To	G	W	D	L	GF	GA	GD	Win %
Derry City (interim)	5 August 2026	Present	14	9	3	2	26	18	+8	64.29
Total			14	9	3	2	26	18	+8	64.29

== Honours ==
=== As a player ===
Dundee United

- Scottish Championship: 2019–20

Derry City

- FAI Cup: 2022
- President of Ireland's Cup: 2023

Coleraine

- Irish Cup: 2025–26

Individual

- League of Ireland Player of the Month: June 2022,
- PFAI Premier Division Team of the Year (2): 2022, 2024

=== As a manager ===
Derry City

- FAI Cup: 2026
