= Mitchell Beeney =

English footballer (born 1995)

Personal information
- Full name: Mitchell Ryan Beeney
- Date of birth: 3 October 1995 (age 31)
- Place of birth: Leeds, England
- Height: 1.98 m (6 ft 6 in)
- Position: Goalkeeper

Team information
- Current team: Punjab United

Youth career
- 2004–2007: Gillingham
- 2007–2015: Chelsea

Senior career*
Years	Team	Apps	(Gls)
2015–2018	Chelsea	0	(0)
2016	→ Newport County (loan)	4	(0)
2016–2017	→ Crawley Town (loan)	1	(0)
2018	→ Sligo Rovers (loan)	16	(0)
2018–2019	Sligo Rovers	22	(0)
2019–2020	Hartlepool United	6	(0)
2020	Cheshunt	2	(0)
2021–2022	Bowers and Pitsea	35	(0)
2022	Horsham	13	(0)
2022–2023	Concord Rangers	31	(0)
2023	Dartford	16	(0)
2023–2024	Horsham	3	(0)
2024	Chatham Town	11	(0)
2024–2025	Ashford United	26	(0)
2025	Beckenham Town	18	(0)
2025	Sittingbourne	12	(0)
2025–2026	Faversham Town	11	(0)
2026–	Punjab United	8	(0)

International career^{‡}
2013–2014	England U19	4	(0)
- * Club domestic league appearances and goals as of 13:11, 20 May 2026 (UTC) ‡ National team caps and goals as of 12:10, 13 June 2023 (UTC)

Mitchell Ryan Beeney (born 3 October 1995) is an English professional footballer who plays as a goalkeeper for Isthmian League South East Division club Punjab United.

== Club career ==
=== Chelsea ===
In 2007, Beeney joined Chelsea's academy from Gillingham, along with his brother Jordan. After becoming a key member of Chelsea's under-18 squad, Beeney was promoted up to the under-21 squad. On 10 May 2015, he was named on the bench to face Liverpool, remaining unused in the 1–1 draw at Stamford Bridge.

==== Loan to Newport County ====
On 15 January 2016, Beeney joined League Two side Newport County on a one-month loan deal. The next day, he made his professional debut in a 1–0 victory over York City at Bootham Crescent, therefore earning a clean sheet. The loan period was extended on 18 February, to 16 April. However, on 25 February 2016 Beeney was released from his loan by Newport manager Warren Feeney.

==== Loan to Crawley Town ====
On 23 June 2016, it was announced that Beeney would be joining League Two side Crawley Town until January 2017. On 20 July 2016, it was announced that Beeney would wear the number one jersey ahead of Crawley Town's 2016–17 campaign. Then later on he signed a one-year extension at Chelsea. On 30 August 2016, Beeney was given his first start in an EFL Trophy tie against Colchester United, after being used as a back-up to Yusuf Mersin. The game resulted in a 1–0 victory for the Reds, with James Collins scoring the only goal. On 10 September 2016, Beeney made his league debut in a 2–1 away defeat against Stevenage.

==== Loan to Sligo Rovers ====
On 22 February 2018, Beeney was announced as having signed on loan for Sligo Rovers of the League of Ireland until 30 June 2018. A day later, he made his debut during their 2–1 home victory over Derry City, playing the full 90 minutes as Sligo Rovers claimed their first three points of the season.

=== Sligo Rovers ===
After being released by Chelsea, Beeney re-signed for Rovers on a permanent deal.

=== Non-league ===
Beeney signed for National League side Hartlepool on a short-term contract on 7 December 2019. He went on to make six league appearances before being released at the end of the 2019–20 season. Following his departure from Pools, Beeney signed for Cheshunt.

In the 2021–22 season, Beeney made 36 league appearances for Bowers & Pitsea.

On June 17, 2022, it was announced that he had signed for Isthmian League Premier Division side Horsham.

On 31 October 2022, Beeney signed for Concord Rangers.

On 13 June 2023, Beeney signed for Dartford.

On 29 November 2023, it was confirmed that Beeney had left the club by mutual consent.

After re-joining Horsham in December 2023, he signed for Chatham Town on 10 February 2024.

In July 2024, Beeney signed for Isthmian League South East Division side Ashford United. In May 2025, he joined Sittingbourne.

In November 2025, Beeney joined fellow Isthmian League South East Division club Faversham Town. He joined SCEFL Premier Division club Punjab United in March 2026.

== Personal life ==
Mitchell Beeney attended Imberhorne School in East Grinstead. He is the son of Mark Beeney. His brother, Jordan, previously played for Charlton Athletic.

== Career statistics ==
As of end of 2025–26 season

Appearances and goals by club, season and competition
Club	Season	League			National Cup		League Cup		Other		Total	
Club	Season	Division	Apps	Goals	Apps	Goals	Apps	Goals	Apps	Goals	Apps	Goals
Chelsea	2014–15	Premier League	0	0	0	0	0	0	0	0	0	0
Chelsea	2015–16	Premier League	0	0	0	0	0	0	0	0	0	0
Chelsea	2016–17	Premier League	0	0	0	0	0	0	0	0	0	0
Chelsea	2017–18	Premier League	0	0	0	0	0	0	0	0	0	0
Chelsea	Total		0	0	0	0	0	0	0	0	0	0
Newport County (loan)	2015–16	League Two	4	0	0	0	0	0	0	0	4	0
Crawley Town (loan)	2016–17	League Two	1	0	0	0	0	0	3 (Note: Appearance(s) in EFL Trophy)	0	4	0
Sligo Rovers	2018	League of Ireland Premier Division	25	0	0	0	3	0	1	0	29	0
Sligo Rovers	2019	League of Ireland Premier Division	13	0	0	0	0	0	0	0	13	0
Sligo Rovers	Total		38	0	0	0	3	0	1	0	42	0
Hartlepool United	2019–20	National League	6	0	1	0	—		0	0	7	0
Cheshunt	2020–21	Isthmian Premier Division	2	0	0	0	—		1	0	3	0
Bowers & Pitsea	2021–22	Isthmian Premier Division	35	0	5	0	—		6	0	46	0
Horsham	2022–23	Isthmian Premier Division	13	0	1	0	—		2	0	16	0
Concord Rangers	2022–23	National League South	31	0	0	0	—		0	0	31	0
Dartford	2023–24	National League South	16	0	1	0	—		1 (Note: One appearance in the Kent Senior Cup)	0	18	0
Horsham	2023–24	Isthmian Premier Division	3	0	0	0	—		1	0	4	0
Chatham Town	2023–24	Isthmian Premier Division	11	0	0	0	—		5	0	16	0
Ashford United	2024–25	Isthmian South East Division	26	0	6	0	—		5 (Note: Four appearances in FA Trophy, one appearance in Alan Turvey Trophy)	0	37	0
Beckenham Town	2024–25	Isthmian South East Division	18	0	0	0	—		0	0	18	0
Sittingbourne	2025–26	Isthmiam South East Division	12	0	2	0	—		3 (Note: Two appearances in FA Trophy, one appearance in Alan Turvey Trophy)	0	17	0
Faversham Town	2025–26	Isthmian South East Division	11	0	0	0	—		0	0	11	0
Punjab United	2025–26	SCEFL Premier Division	8	0	—		—		3 (Note: One appearance in FA Vase, two appearances in SCEFL Premier Division play-offs)	0	11	0
Career total			235	0	16	0	3	0	31	0	285	0
