= Joe McNerney =

English footballer

Personal information
- Full name: Joseph John McNerney
- Date of birth: 24 January 1990 (age 36)
- Place of birth: Chertsey, England
- Height: 6 ft 4 in (1.93 m)
- Position: Defender

Youth career
- 2006–2008: Woking

Senior career*
Years	Team	Apps	(Gls)
2008–2015	Woking	203	(11)
2009	→ Corinthian-Casuals (loan)		
2009–2010	→ Ashford Town (loan)	3	(1)
2015–2021	Crawley Town	122	(7)
2021–2023	Woking	59	(2)
2023–2025	Havant & Waterlooville	55	(3)
2025	Weymouth	5	(0)

International career
2014	England C	1	(0)
- * Club domestic league appearances and goals as of 14:10, 5 September 2025 (UTC)

Joseph John McNerney (born 24 January 1990) is an English professional footballer who plays as a defender. He is currently a free agent.

== Early life ==
McNerney was born in Chertsey on 24 January 1990.

== Club career ==
=== Woking ===
After joining Woking's academy at the age of 16, McNerney made his professional debut in a 1–0 away defeat against Altrincham on 21 February 2009, replacing Charlie Moone with four minutes remaining. McNerney went onto appear two more times for the Cards in his debut season, before enjoying two successful loan spells at Corinthian-Casuals and Ashford Town in the 2009–10 campaign.

McNerney became a key figure in Woking's promotion bid in the 2010–11 campaign, appearing in forty-nine games in all competitions, including six in their impressive FA Cup run, which saw the Cards lose on penalties to League One side Brighton & Hove Albion in a first-round replay. The following season saw McNerney and Woking win promotion back to the Conference Premier after a three-year absence, sealing the title on 14 April 2012, in a 1–0 home victory against Maidenhead United. In September 2014, after impressing for the Cards, McNerney received a call-up for the England C squad. However, the centre-half failed to appear in both games against Turkey A2 and Estonia U23, remaining as an unused substitute. McNerney went on to make over 120 league appearances in the next three years, before leaving the Surrey-based side in 2015.

=== Crawley Town ===
On 19 June 2015, McNerney joined League Two side Crawley Town on a two-year deal after impressing whilst at Woking. After being assigned the number five jersey, McNerney made his debut in Crawley's 1–1 away draw against Oxford United, featuring for the entire 90 minutes. On 10 October 2015, McNerney supposedly dislocated his kneecap after landing awkwardly from a jump in a match against Leyton Orient. However, a month later, it was revealed that the injury was not as bad as first thought. On 28 March 2016, McNerney made his return from his long-term injury, in a 2–0 home defeat against Exeter City, replacing Jon Ashton with just over ten minutes remaining. On 9 April 2016, McNerney went onto score his first Crawley goal in their reverse home fixture against Oxford United, which resulted in a 5–1 shock defeat, with the centre-half netting the opener in the 28th minute.

On 6 August 2016, McNerney made his first appearance of the 2016–17 campaign, in a 1–0 home victory over Wycombe Wanderers. Two weeks later, McNerney scored Crawley's equaliser in their 1–1 home draw with Barnet after John Akinde had given the visitors the lead in the 3rd minute. A couple of weeks after scoring in Crawley's away victory over Wycombe Wanderers, McNerney was rewarded with a new two-year contract, with the option for a third-year.

On 18 May 2021, it was announced that McNerney would leave the club upon the expiry of his contract following a six-year spell.

=== Return to Woking ===
On 7 June 2021, following his release from Crawley, McNerney opted to return to his boyhood club, Woking on a two-year deal. On 21 August 2021, McNerney made his return in a Woking shirt, playing the full 90 minutes during their 2–1 away victory against Wealdstone on the opening day of the 2021–22 campaign.

Following 69 appearances and 2 goals, it was announced that after two years back at the Cardinals, McNerney would once again leave the club following the conclusion of his contract in June 2023.

=== Havant & Waterlooville ===
On 9 June 2023, Havant & Waterlooville announced the signing of McNerney on a two-year contract. He was chosen as the team's captain for the 2024–25 season.

=== Weymouth ===
On 24 June 2024, Weymouth announced the signing of McNerney. He debuted for Weymouth in the 4–2 friendly win against Portland United on 5 July 2025.

He left the club on 5 September 2025 after making six competitive appearances including one in the FA Cup against Tadley Calleva.

== International career ==
In September 2014, McNerney was called up to the England C team for International Challenge Trophy qualifying fixtures the following month. He won one England C cap.

== Career statistics ==
As of match played 23 September 2023

Appearances and goals by club, season and competition
Club	Season	League			FA Cup		League Cup		Other		Total	
Club	Season	Division	Apps	Goals	Apps	Goals	Apps	Goals	Apps	Goals	Apps	Goals
Woking	2008–09	Conference Premier	3	0	0	0	—		0	0	3	0
Woking	2009–10	Conference South	8	0	4	0	—		4 (Note: One appearance in FA Trophy, three in Conference South play-offs)	0	16	0
Woking	2010–11	Conference South	37	1	6	1	—		6 (Note: Four appearances in FA Trophy, two in Conference South play-offs)	0	49	2
Woking	2011–12	Conference South	31	3	2	0	—		0	0	33	3
Woking	2012–13	Conference Premier	45	3	0	0	—		2 (Note: Appearance(s) in FA Trophy)	0	47	3
Woking	2013–14	Conference Premier	46	4	1	0	—		2	0	49	4
Woking	2014–15	Conference Premier	33	0	2	0	—		5	0	40	0
Woking	Total		203	11	15	1	—		19	0	237	12
Crawley Town	2015–16	League Two	11	1	0	0	1	0	1 (Note: Appearance(s) in Football League Trophy)	0	13	1
Crawley Town	2016–17	League Two	34	3	0	0	1	0	0	0	35	3
Crawley Town	2017–18	League Two	16	1	1	0	1	0	3 (Note: Appearance(s) in EFL Trophy)	0	21	1
Crawley Town	2018–19	League Two	29	1	1	0	0	0	3	0	33	1
Crawley Town	2019–20	League Two	6	0	0	0	0	0	1	0	7	0
Crawley Town	2020–21	League Two	26	1	1	0	1	0	3	0	31	1
Crawley Town	Total		122	7	3	0	4	0	11	0	140	7
Woking	2021–22	National League	24	2	1	0	—		1	0	26	2
Woking	2022–23	National League	35	0	1	0	—		1 (Note: One appearance in National League play-offs)	0	37	0
Woking	Total		59	2	2	0	—		2	0	69	2
Havant & Waterlooville	2023–24	National League South	7	0	0	0	—		0	0	7	0
Career total			391	20	20	1	4	0	33	0	453	21

== Honours ==
=== Club ===
Woking

- Conference South: 2011–12
