= Yusuf Mersin =

Turkish footballer (born 1994)

Personal information
- Full name: Yusuf Mersin
- Date of birth: 23 September 1994 (age 32)
- Place of birth: Greenwich, England
- Height: 1.95 m (6 ft 5 in)
- Position: Goalkeeper

Team information
- Current team: Leek Town

Youth career
- Millwall
- 2011–2014: Liverpool

Senior career*
Years	Team	Apps	(Gls)
2014–2016	Kasımpaşa	0	(0)
2016–2019	Crawley Town	10	(0)
2019–2021	Dover Athletic	17	(0)
2021–2023	Maidstone United	27	(0)
2023	→ Welling United (loan)	2	(0)
2023–2024	H&W Welders		
2024–2025	Mickleover	48	(0)
2025–2026	Hyde United	24	(0)
2026	→ Runcorn Linnets (loan)	2	(0)
2026	Runcorn Linnets		
2026	Nantwich Town	3	(0)
2026–	Leek Town	6	(0)

International career^{‡}
2010	Turkey U16	2	(0)
2010–2011	Turkey U17	5	(0)
2012	Turkey U18	1	(0)
- * Club domestic league appearances and goals as of 08:59, 14 February 2026 (UTC) ‡ National team caps and goals as of 9 December 2017

Yusuf Mersin (born 23 September 1994) is a professional footballer who plays as a goalkeeper for Northern Premier League Division One West club Runcorn Linnets. Born in England, he represented Turkey at youth international level.

== Club career ==
Born in London, Mersin moved from Millwall to Liverpool in January 2011.

He signed for Kasımpaşa in August 2014, before returning to England with Crawley Town in June 2016. He was offered a new contract by Crawley at the end of the 2017–18 season. On 9 May 2019, Mersin was released by Crawley after making 19 appearances for the club.

On 20 May 2019, Mersin joined National League side Dover Athletic on a two-year contract. He made his debut for the club on 19 October in the FA Cup 4th qualifying round, a 2–1 victory over National League South side Weymouth and made his league debut the following week in a 1–0 defeat to Stockport County, being caught out from 45 yards for the only goal of the match. Following the arrival of Charlton Athletic loanee Ashley Maynard-Brewer, in February 2020 Mersin was placed on the transfer list by Dover. Following's Dover's decision to not play any more matches in the 2020–21 season, made in late January, and subsequent null and voiding of all results, on 5 May 2021 it was announced that Mersin was out of contract and had left the club.

He signed for Maidstone United in November 2021, making his debut as a substitute in February 2022 after first-choice goalkeeper Tom Hadler was sent off.

In March 2023, he joined Welling United on a two-week emergency loan deal. He was released by Maidstone at the end of the 2022–23 season.

In July 2023 he signed for H&W Welders in Northern Ireland. In March 2024 he returned to England, signing for Mickleover.

In May 2025, Mersin joined Northern Premier League Premier Division side Hyde United, and went on to play 33 matches in all competitions for the club. On 12 February 2026, he transferred to Runcorn Linnets of the NPL Division One West, following a brief loan spell there the previous month.

In August 2026, Mersin joined Nantwich Town following a successful trial period. He joined Leek Town in October 2026.

== International career ==
He has represented Turkey at under-17 and under-18 youth international levels.

== Career statistics ==
As of match played 25 August 2026

Appearances and goals by club, season and competition
Club	Season	League			FA Cup		League Cup		Other		Total	
Club	Season	Division	Apps	Goals	Apps	Goals	Apps	Goals	Apps	Goals	Apps	Goals
Crawley Town	2016–17	League Two	8	0	0	0	1	0	1 (Note: Appearance(s) in EFL Trophy.)	0	10	0
Crawley Town	2017–18	League Two	2	0	0	0	0	0	3	0	5	0
Crawley Town	2018–19	League Two	0	0	0	0	1	0	3	0	4	0
Crawley Town	Total		10	0	0	0	2	0	7	0	19	0
Dover Athletic	2019–20	National League	10	0	2	0	–		0	0	12	0
Dover Athletic	2020–21	National League	7	0	0	0	—		1 (Note: Appearance(s) in FA Trophy)	0	8	0
Dover Athletic	Total		17	0	2	0	—		1	0	20	0
Maidstone United	2021–22	National League South	7	0	0	0	—		0	0	7	0
Maidstone United	2022–23	National League	20	0	1	0	—		0	0	21	0
Maidstone United	Total		27	0	1	0	0	0	0	0	28	0
Welling United (loan)	2022–23	National League South	2	0	—		—		0	0	2	0
Mickleover	2023–24	Southern League Premier Central	8	0	0	0	—		1 (Note: Appearance(s) in Southern League Premier Division Central play-offs)	0	9	0
Mickleover	2024–25	Northern Premier League Premier Division	40	0	2	0	—		5 (Note: Two appearances in FA Trophy, three appearances in Derbyshire Senior Cup)	0	47	0
Mickleover	Total		48	0	2	0	0	0	6	0	56	0
Hyde United	2025–26	Northern Premier League Premier Division	24	0	5	0	—		4 (Note: Two appearances in FA Trophy, one appearance in Cheshire Senior Cup, one appearance in Manchester Premier Cup)	0	33	0
Runcorn Linnets (loan)	2025–26	Northern Premier League Division One West	2	0	—		—		0	0	2	0
Runcorn Linnets	2025–26	Northern Premier League Division One West	0	0	—		—		0	0	0	0
Nantwich Town	2026–27	Northern Premier League Division One West	3	0	0	0	—		0	0	3	0
Career total			133	0	10	0	2	0	18	0	163	0
