= Bobson Bawling =

English footballer (born 1995)

Personal information
- Full name: Alfred Bobson Bawling
- Date of birth: 21 September 1995 (age 31)
- Place of birth: Islington, England
- Height: 5 ft 10 in (1.78 m)
- Position: Midfielder

Team information
- Current team: Haringey Borough

Youth career
- 2005–2008: Chelsea
- 2008–2013: Watford

Senior career*
Years	Team	Apps	(Gls)
2013–2014	Watford	0	(0)
2013–2014	→ Wealdstone (loan)	3	(0)
2014–2017	Crawley Town	71	(6)
2017–2018	Woking	12	(1)
2018	Torquay United	6	(0)
2018	→ Oxford City (loan)	3	(0)
2018–2019	Oxford City	23	(1)
2019	St Albans City	11	(0)
2019–2020	Enfield Town	7	(0)
2020–2022	Haringey Borough	51	(9)
2022	Hendon	13	(0)
2022–	Haringey Borough	64	(5)
- * Club domestic league appearances and goals as of 17:05, 18 March 2025 (UTC)

Alfred Bobson Bawling (born 21 September 1995) is a semi-professional footballer who plays for Haringey Borough as a midfielder.

== Club career ==
After competing in athletics at county level, Bawling decided to take up football and joined the Watford academy at a young age after being released by Chelsea in 2008. Bawling progressed through the youth set-up, and signed a two-year scholarship in 2012. and as part of his development moved to Wealdstone on a one-month work experience loan in December 2013 where he made a handful of appearances. Upon the expiration of his contract, Bawling was released by Watford at the end of the 2013–14 season.

After leaving Watford, Bawling went on trial at League One side Crawley Town in the summer of 2014 and later signed a one-year deal at the club. He made his professional debut as a half-time substitute in their 1–0 win at Barnsley on 9 August 2014. Three days later, Bawling made his first start for Crawley in their League Cup tie against Ipswich Town, featuring for 63 minutes before being replaced by Ryan Dickson in their 1–0 victory. On 30 May 2017, it was announced that Bawling would leave Crawley upon the expiry of his contract in June 2017.

On 31 May 2017, it was announced that Bawling had signed for Woking of the National League for the 2017–18 season. On 5 August 2017, Bawling made his Woking debut during their 2–1 home victory over Gateshead, featuring for 70 minutes before being replaced by Jamie Philpot. On 28 August 2017, during Woking's 4–1 victory over Torquay United, Bawling scored his first ever professional goal, placing his effort into the top right hand corner past goalkeeper, Dan Lavercombe.

On 16 May 2018, it was announced that Bawling would join National League South side Torquay United, following his release from Woking. Shortly into 2018/19, on 5 October 2018, Bawling joined Oxford City on a one-month loan, making an instant impact by scoring against Dartford on his debut. The move was made permanent in November 2018.

Bawling joined St Albans City in the summer 2019 but left the club again on 12 October 2019 to join Enfield Town.

Following a two-year spell with Haringey Borough, Bawling joined Hendon in July 2022. He returned to Haringey just five months later following thirteen league appearances with Hendon.

== Career statistics ==
As of match played 15 March 2025

Appearances and goals by club, season and competition
Club	Season	League			FA Cup		League Cup		Other		Total	
Club	Season	Division	Apps	Goals	Apps	Goals	Apps	Goals	Apps	Goals	Apps	Goals
Watford	2013–14	Championship	0	0	0	0	0	0	—		0	0
Wealdstone (loan)	2013–14	Isthmian League Premier Division	3	0	0	0	—		0	0	3	0
Crawley Town	2014–15	League One	28	0	0	0	2	0	2 (Note: Appearance in Football League Trophy)	0	32	0
Crawley Town	2015–16	League Two	15	0	0	0	1	0	0	0	16	0
Crawley Town	2016–17	League Two	28	0	1	0	1	0	3 (Note: Appearances in EFL Trophy)	0	33	0
Crawley Town	Total		71	0	1	0	4	0	5	0	81	0
Woking	2017–18	National League	12	1	1	0	—		0	0	13	1
Torquay United	2018–19	National League South	6	0	0	0	—		0	0	6	0
Oxford City (loan)	2018–19	National League South	3	0	2	1	—		0	0	5	1
Oxford City	2018–19	National League South	23	1	—		—		2 (Note: Appearances in FA Trophy)	0	25	1
St Albans City	2019–20	National League South	11	0	1	0	—		0	0	12	0
Enfield Town	2019–20	Isthmian League Premier Division	7	0	—		—		1 (Note: Appearance in Alan Turvey Trophy)	0	8	0
Haringey Borough	2020–21	Isthmian League Premier Division	8	3	4	3	—		5	2	17	8
Haringey Borough	2021–22	Isthmian League Premier Division	34	6	0	0	—		3 (Note: One appearance in FA Trophy, two in Alan Turvey Trophy)	0	37	6
Haringey Borough	Total		51	9	4	3	—		8	2	63	14
Hendon	2022–23	Southern League Premier Division South	13	0	4	0	—		1	0	18	0
Haringey Borough	2022–23	Isthmian League Premier Division	16	3	—		—		—		16	3
Haringey Borough	2023–24	Isthmian League Premier Division	33	1	4	0	—		5 (Note: Two appearances in FA Trophy, three in Alan Turvey Trophy)	0	42	1
Haringey Borough	2024–25	Isthmian League North Division	15	1	0	0	—		0	0	15	1
Haringey Borough	Total		64	5	4	0	—		5	0	73	5
Career total			255	16	14	4	4	0	22	2	295	22
