= Dermot Drummy =

English footballer and manager

Personal information
- Date of birth: 16 January 1961
- Place of birth: Hackney, London, England
- Date of death: 27 November 2017 (aged 56)
- Place of death: Hoddesdon, Hertfordshire, England
- Position: Midfielder

Youth career
- 1974–1979: Arsenal

Senior career*
Years	Team	Apps	(Gls)
1979–1980	Arsenal	0	(0)
1979–1980	→ Blackpool (loan)	5	(0)
1980–1990	Hendon	240	(38)
- Wealdstone
- Enfield
- Ware
1990	St Albans City	7	(0)
Total		251	(38)

Managerial career
- 1996–1997: Ware
- 2009–2011: Chelsea Academy
- 2011–2014: Chelsea Reserves
- 2016–2017: Crawley Town
- * Club domestic league appearances and goals

Dermot Drummy (16 January 1961 – 27 November 2017) was an English football coach and professional player. He was the head coach of Crawley Town, a position he took up in April 2016 after serving three years as manager of the Chelsea reserves and two years as the youth team manager.

Drummy died by suicide at the age of 56 in November 2017.

== Club career ==
Drummy, who played as a midfielder, began his career with the youth team at Arsenal. He never made the first team at Arsenal, but did make five appearances in the Football League on loan at Blackpool. He later played non-league football for Hendon, Wealdstone, Enfield, Ware and St Albans City. While at Hendon, Drummy scored in the final of the 1988 Middlesex Senior Charity Cup where Hendon were crowned champions.

== Coaching career ==
Drummy was player-manager at Ware during the 1996–97 season. He left halfway through to become a youth coach at Arsenal, before becoming manager of the Chelsea Academy in January 2009. The academy won the 2009–10 FA Youth Cup in his second year in charge, beating the Aston Villa Academy 3–2 on aggregate – the academy's first Youth Cup victory in 49 years. After a successful spell managing the youth team, Drummy was appointed reserve team manager in July 2011, replacing Steve Holland who went on to work with the first team.

For the 2012–13 season the old reserve team league was replaced by a new under-21 format, with Drummy taking control of that squad, as well as an under-19 team that competed in a European competition – the NextGen Series. The final of that was reached with Barcelona, Ajax, Juventus and Arsenal beaten along the way, before defeat to Aston Villa in a match held in Italy. In the 2013–14 season, Drummy won the Under-21 Premier League.

Drummy moved to the role of international head coach in June 2014.

In June 2015, Drummy was offered the manager's job at Brazilian side Bangu.

He became head coach of Crawley Town in April 2016. He left in May 2017.

== Death ==
Drummy died at the age of 56 in November 2017. The cause of death was announced on 5 April 2018 as suicide.

== Managerial statistics ==
As of match played 29 April 2017

Managerial record by team and tenure
Team	From	To	Record					Ref
Team	From	To	P	W	D	L	Win %	Ref
Crawley Town	27 April 2016	4 May 2017	54	15	12	27	27.8	
Total			54	15	12	27	27.8	—
