= 2017–18 Crawley Town F.C. season =

Crawley Town
2017–18 season
- Chairman: Ziya Eren
- Manager: Harry Kewell
- Stadium: Broadfield Stadium
- League Two: 14th
- FA Cup: First round (eliminated by Wigan Athletic)
- EFL Cup: First round (eliminated by Birmingham City)
- EFL Trophy: Group stage
- Sussex Senior Cup: Runners up (eliminated by Brighton & Hove Albion U23)
- Top goalscorer: League: Enzio Boldewijn (10 goals); Jimmy Smith (10 goals); All: Enzio Boldewijn (10 goals); Jimmy Smith (10 goals)
- Highest home attendance: 5,008 vs Swindon Town, League Two, 2 April 2018
- Lowest home attendance: 435 vs Fulham U23s, EFL Trophy, 29 November 2017
- Average home league attendance: 2,268
Home colours	Away colours

The 2017–18 season was Crawley Town's 122nd season in their history and their third consecutive season in League Two. Along with League Two, the club also competed in the FA Cup, EFL Cup and EFL Trophy.

The season covered the period from 1 July 2017 to 30 June 2018.

== Players ==
=== First team squad ===
As of 5 May 2018

No.	Name	Nat	Position	Since	Date of birth (age)	Signed from	Games	Goals
Goalkeepers
1	Glenn Morris	(England)	GK	2016	20 December 1983 (age 42)	(England) Gillingham	87	0
12	Yusuf Mersin	(Turkey)	GK	2016	23 September 1994 (age 32)	(Turkey) Kasımpaşa	15	0
Defenders
2	Lewis Young	(England)	RB	2014	27 September 1989 (age 37)	(England) Bury	177	3
3	Josh Doherty	(Northern Ireland)	LB	2017	15 March 1996 (age 30)	(Northern Ireland) Ards	16	0
5	Joe McNerney	(England)	CB	2015	24 January 1990 (age 36)	(England) Woking	69	5
6	Mark Connolly	(Republic of Ireland)	CB	2016	16 December 1991 (age 34)	(Scotland) Kilmarnock	167	8
15	Josh Yorwerth	(Wales)	CB	2016	28 February 1995 (age 31)	(England) Ipswich Town	91	4
19	Cedric Evina	(Cameroon)	LB	2017	16 November 1991 (age 34)	(England) Doncaster Rovers	34	0
22	Josh Lelan	(Kenya)	CB	2017	21 December 1994 (age 31)	(England) Derby County	46	0
Midfielders
4	Josh Payne	(England)	DM	2016	25 November 1990 (age 35)	(England) Eastleigh	72	6
8	Jimmy Smith	(England)	CM	2014	7 January 1987 (age 39)	(England) Stevenage	165	19
9	Karlan Ahearne-Grant	(England)	AM	2018	18 September 1997 (age 29)	(England) Charlton Athletic	15	9
10	Dean Cox	(England)	LW	2016	12 August 1987 (age 39)	(England) Leyton Orient	27	2
11	Jordan Roberts	(England)	LW	2016	5 January 1994 (age 32)	(Scotland) Inverness Caledonian Thistle	62	11
17	Kaby Djaló	(Guinea-Bissau)	CM	2016	5 February 1992 (age 34)	(Finland) PS Kemi	39	1
18	Billy Clifford	(England)	CM	2016	18 October 1992 (age 34)	(England) Boreham Wood	54	2
20	Aryan Tajbakhsh	(England)	DM	2016	27 October 1990 (age 36)	(England) Cray Wanderers	31	0
21	Dannie Bulman	(England)	CM	2017	24 January 1979 (age 47)	(England) AFC Wimbledon	328	12
25	Mark Randall	(England)	CM	2017	28 September 1989 (age 37)	(Wales) Newport County	33	1
27	Moussa Sanoh	(Netherlands)	RW	2017	20 July 1995 (age 31)	(Netherlands) RKC Waalwijk	16	1
Forwards
7	Enzio Boldewijn	(Netherlands)	RW	2016	17 November 1992 (age 33)	(Netherlands) Almere City	100	16
23	Thomas Verheydt	(Netherlands)	CF	2017	24 January 1992 (age 34)	(Netherlands) MVV Maastricht	22	2
28	Panutche Camará	(Guinea-Bissau)	CF	2017	28 February 1997 (age 29)	(England) Dulwich Hamlet	34	3

== New contracts ==
Date	Position	Nationality	Name	Contract length	Contract end	Ref.
19 September 2017	CB	(Wales)	Josh Yorwerth	3 years	2020	
31 January 2018	GK	(England)	Glenn Morris	2.5 years	2020	
1 February 2018	CM	(England)	Josh Payne	2.5 years	2020	
2 May 2018	RB	(Northern Ireland)	Josh Doherty	2 years	2020	

== Transfers ==
=== In ===
Date from	Position	Nationality	Name	From	Fee	Ref.
1 July 2017	CM	ENG	Dannie Bulman	AFC Wimbledon	Free	
1 July 2017	CF	GNB	Panutche Camará	Dulwich Hamlet	Free	
1 July 2017	CM	ENG	Mark Randall	Newport County	Free	
1 July 2017	RW	NED	Moussa Sanoh	RKC Waalwijk	Free	
6 July 2017	CF	NED	Thomas Verheydt	MVV Maastricht	Undisclosed	
5 September 2017	CB	NIR	Josh Doherty	Ards	Free	
13 October 2017	CB	POL	Nathan Okoye	Waltham Forest	Free	

=== Out ===
Date from	Position	Nationality	Name	To	Fee	Ref.
30 June 2017	LW	ENG	Jason Banton	Woking	Released	(Note: Jason Banton joined Woking following his release.)
30 June 2017	RM	ENG	Bobson Bawling	Woking	Released	(Note: Bobson Bawling joined Woking following his release.)
30 June 2017	CM	IRL	Conor Henderson	Eastbourne Borough	Released	(Note: Conor Henderson joined Eastbourne Borough following his release.)
1 July 2017	CF	IRL	James Collins	Luton Town	Undisclosed	
1 August 2017	LB	ENG	Chris Arthur	Aldershot Town	Mutual consent	(Note: Chris Arthur joined Aldershot Town following his release.)
25 August 2017	LB	ENG	Andre Blackman	Barnet	Mutual consent	(Note: Andre Blackman joined Barnet following his release.)
31 August 2017	CF	ENG	Matt Harrold	Leyton Orient	Free	
18 January 2018	CB	ENG	Addison Garnett	Bedfont Sports	Mutual consent	(Note: Addison Garnett joined Bedfont Sports following his release.)
13 February 2018	CB	POL	Nathan Okoye	Romford	Free	

=== Loans in ===
Date from	Position	Nationality	Name	From	Date until	Ref.
1 July 2017	LB	CMR	Cedric Evina	Doncaster Rovers	30 June 2018	
6 July 2017	RW	ENG	Dennon Lewis	Watford	31 December 2017	
25 August 2017	CF	ENG	Ibrahim Meite	Cardiff City	1 January 2018	
30 January 2018	FW	ENG	Karlan Ahearne-Grant	Charlton Athletic	30 June 2018	

=== Loans out ===
Date from	Position	Nationality	Name	To	Date until	Ref.
25 August 2017	CB	ENG	Addison Garnett	Whitehawk	7 October 2017	

== Pre-season ==
As of 22 June 2017, Crawley Town have announced seven pre-season fixtures against Brighton & Hove Albion, East Grinstead Town, Dulwich Hamlet, Bognor Regis Town, Oakwood, Chelsea XI and Portsmouth.

Win Draw Loss

8 July 2017	East Grinstead Town	1–6	Crawley Town	East Grinstead
15:00 BST	Elliott 18'	Report	Boldewijn 10'; Smith 45'; Cox 45'; Camara 52'; Harrold 61', 85'	Stadium: East Court

11 July 2017	Oakwood	0–2	Crawley Town	Crawley
19:00 BST		Report	Randall 48'; Young 52'	Stadium: Tinsley Lane

11 July 2017	Oakwood	0–9	Crawley Town	Crawley
20:15 BST		Report	Roberts 2', 25'; Harrold 6', 20', 30'; Tajbakhsh 13'; Camara 30'; Sanoh 33'; 42' (og.)	Stadium: Tinsley Lane

15 July 2017	Crawley Town	1–1	Chelsea XI	Crawley
15:00 BST	McNerney 87'	Report	Brown 75'	Stadium: Broadfield Stadium; Attendance: 3,546

18 July 2017	Dulwich Hamlet	2–4	Crawley Town	East Dulwich
19:45 BST	Dumaka 30', 42'	Report	Boldewijn 2'; Camara 29', 53'; Harrold 85'	Stadium: Champion Hill; Attendance: 392

22 July 2017	Crawley Town	0–6	Brighton & Hove Albion	Crawley
15:00 BST		Report	March 3'; Groß 30'; Hemed 38'; Murphy 41'; Goldson 67'; Murray 78'	Stadium: Broadfield Stadium

26 July 2017	Bognor Regis Town	1–2	Crawley Town	Bognor Regis
19:45 BST	Pearce 22'	Report	Sanoh 83'; Lewis 90'	Stadium: Nyewood Lane

29 July 2017	Crawley Town	1–2	Portsmouth	Crawley
15:00 BST	Verheydt 3'	Report	Pitman 55', 75'	Stadium: Broadfield Stadium; Attendance: 1,603

== Competitions ==
=== Overview ===
Competition	Record							
Competition	G	W	D	L	GF	GA	GD	Win %
League Two	46	16	11	19	58	66	−8	34.78
FA Cup	1	0	0	1	1	2	−1	0.00
EFL Cup	1	0	0	1	1	5	−4	0.00
EFL Trophy	3	0	0	3	2	8	−6	0.00
Total	51	16	11	24	62	81	−19	31.37

Updated to match played 5 May 2018
Source: Competitions

=== League Two ===
==== League table ====
Pos	Team	Pld	W	D	L	GF	GA	GD	Pts
12	Cambridge United	46	17	13	16	56	60	−4	64
13	Colchester United	46	16	14	16	53	52	+1	62
14	Crawley Town	46	16	11	19	58	66	−8	59
15	Crewe Alexandra	46	17	5	24	62	75	−13	56
16	Stevenage	46	14	13	19	60	65	−5	55

Source: BBC Sport
Rules for classification: 1) Points; 2) Goal difference; 3) Number of goals scored

==== Results summary ====
Overall								Home						Away					
Pld	W	D	L	GF	GA	GD	Pts	W	D	L	GF	GA	GD	W	D	L	GF	GA	GD
46	16	11	19	58	66	−8	59	8	4	10	27	25	+2	8	7	9	31	41	−10

Last updated: 5 May 2018.

==== Results by matchday ====
Matchday	1	2	3	4	5	6	7	8	9	10	11	12	13	14	15	16	17	18	19	20	21	22	23	24	25	26	27	28	29	30	31	32	33	34	35	36	37	38	39	40	41	42	43	44	45	46
Ground	H	A	H	A	H	A	A	H	A	H	H	A	A	H	H	A	H	A	H	A	H	A	A	H	H	A	H	A	A	H	A	H	A	H	A	H	A	H	H	A	H	A	H	A	H	A
Result	L	L	L	W	W	L	D	L	W	L	L	W	D	L	D	D	D	L	W	D	W	L	W	L	W	W	W	L	W	W	W	W	L	W	L	D	D	L	L	L	D	W	L	D	L	D
Position	22	23	24	20	16	18	18	20	17	19	20	18	18	19	19	19	18	20	17	17	17	17	17	18	18	16	14	14	12	12	12	10	11	9	11	12	12	12	13	14	13	12	13	13	14	14

Updated to match(es) played on 5 May 2018. Source: Statto.com
A = Away; H = Home; W = Win; D = Draw; L = Loss

==== Matches ====
Win Draw Loss

The fixtures for the 2017–18 season were announced on 21 June 2017 at 9am.

5 August 2017 1	Crawley Town	1–3	Port Vale	Crawley
15:00 BST	Roberts (yellow card) 25'; Boldewijn 53'; Randall (yellow card) 69'	Report	Tonge 9'; Kay 26'; Turner 82' (yellow card) 84'; Reeves (yellow card) 86'; Gunning (yellow card) 89'	Stadium: Broadfield Stadium; Attendance: 2,270; Referee: Charles Breakspear

12 August 2017 2	Cheltenham Town	1–0	Crawley Town	Cheltenham
15:00 BST	Eisa 38'	Report	Payne (yellow card) 63'	Stadium: Whaddon Road; Attendance: 2,384; Referee: Scott Oldham

19 August 2017 3	Crawley Town	0–1	Cambridge United	Crawley
15:00 BST	Roberts (yellow card) 34'	Report	Legge (yellow card) 10'; Ikpeazu (yellow card) 40'; Ibehre 63'	Stadium: Broadfield Stadium; Attendance: 2,059; Referee: Charles Breakspear

26 August 2017 4	Swindon Town	0–3	Crawley Town	Swindon
15:00 BST	Conroy (yellow card) 45+2'; Lancashire (yellow card) 71'	Report	Evina (yellow card) 26'; Lancashire 36' (o.g.); Smith 79', 85'	Stadium: County Ground; Attendance: 6,613; Referee: Brett Huxtable

2 September 2017 5	Crawley Town	2–0	Yeovil Town	Crawley
15:00 BST	Roberts 12', 51'; Young (yellow card) 27'; Smith (yellow card) 29'; Bulman (yellow card) 61'; Meite (yellow card) 88'	Report	Nelson (yellow card) 17'; Khan (yellow card) 60'; Smith (yellow card) 69'	Stadium: Broadfield Stadium; Attendance: 2,024; Referee: Trevor Kettle

9 September 2017 6	Colchester United	3–1	Crawley Town	Colchester
15:00 BST	Szmodics 8'; Jackson 14'; Kinsella (yellow card) 21'; Mandron 38'; Walker (yellow card) 67'; Lapslie (yellow card) 90+1'	Report	Cox (yellow card) 23'; Smith 66'; Lewis (yellow card) 90'	Stadium: Colchester Community Stadium; Attendance: 2,923; Referee: Graham Horwood

12 September 2017 7	Stevenage	1–1	Crawley Town	Stevenage
19:45 BST	Newton 45+1'	Report	Meite 49'	Stadium: Broadhall Way; Attendance: 1,922; Referee: Andy Haines

16 September 2017 8	Crawley Town	0–1	Notts County	Crawley
15:00 BST	Yorwerth (yellow card) 79'	Report	Grant 55'; Forte (yellow card) 88'	Stadium: Broadfield Stadium; Attendance: 2,352; Referee: John Busby

23 September 2017 9	Barnet	1–2	Crawley Town	Canons Park
15:00 BST	Akinola 65'; Tutonda (yellow card) 79'	Report	Lelan (yellow card) 28'; Smith 63', 89'; Connolly (yellow card) 68'	Stadium: The Hive Stadium; Attendance: 1,602; Referee: Darren Handley

26 September 2017 10	Crawley Town	1–2	Newport County	Crawley
19:45 BST	Connolly 30'; Tajbakhsh (yellow card) 78'; Roberts (yellow card) 85'	Report	Demetriou 40', 51'; Butler (yellow card) 48'; Labadie (yellow card) 51'; Tozer (yellow card) 79'	Stadium: Broadfield Stadium; Attendance: 1,455; Referee: Craig Hicks

30 September 2017 11	Crawley Town	0–1	Carlisle United	Crawley
15:00 BST	Roberts (yellow card) 40'; Evina (yellow card) 64'; Yorwerth (red card) 90+4'; Young (yellow card) 90+5'; Boldewijn (yellow card) 90+5'	Report	Hope 51'; Hill (yellow card) 56'; Bennett (red card) 74'; Parkes (red card) 90+5'; Jones (yellow card) 90+6'	Stadium: Broadfield Stadium; Attendance: 2,021; Referee: Kevin Johnson

7 October 2017 12	Morecambe	0–1	Crawley Town	Morecambe
15:00 BST	Campbell (yellow card) 29'; Ellison (red card) 34'	Report	Clifford 18'; Sanoh (yellow card) 36'; Roberts (yellow card) 45+2'; McNerney (yellow card) 87'	Stadium: Globe Arena; Attendance: 1,222; Referee: Anthony Backhouse

14 October 2017 13	Grimsby Town	0–0	Crawley Town	Cleethorpes
15:00 BST		Report	Smith (yellow card) 40'; Bulman (yellow card) 76'	Stadium: Blundell Park; Attendance: 4,007; Referee: Gavin Ward

17 October 2017 14	Crawley Town	0–2	Chesterfield	Crawley
19:45 BST		Report	Weir (yellow card) 22'; Dennis 73'; Rowley (yellow card) 75'; Flores 88'	Stadium: Broadfield Stadium; Attendance: 1,516; Referee: Nick Kinseley

21 October 2017 15	Crawley Town	0–0	Luton Town	Crawley
15:00 BST	Lelan (yellow card) 83'	Report	Berry (yellow card) 33'; Stacey (yellow card) 38'; Sheehan (yellow card) 53'; Potts (yellow card) 68'	Stadium: Broadfield Stadium; Attendance: 3,494; Referee: Trevor Kettle

28 October 2017 16	Lincoln City	0–0	Crawley Town	Lincoln
15:00 BST	Woodyard (yellow card) 41'; Rhead (yellow card) 67'	Report	Yorwerth (yellow card) 51'; Randall (yellow card) 84'	Stadium: Sincil Bank; Attendance: 8,038; Referee: Darren Handley

11 November 2017 17	Crawley Town	1–1	Forest Green Rovers	Crawley
15:00 GMT	Morris (yellow card) 37'; Connolly (yellow card) 42'; Payne (yellow card) 70'; Verheydt 79'	Report	Monthé (yellow card) 46'; Doidge 67'	Stadium: Broadfield Stadium; Attendance: 2,149; Referee: Tom Nield

18 November 2017 18	Wycombe Wanderers	4–0	Crawley Town	High Wycombe
15:00 GMT	Mackail-Smith (yellow card) 30', (goal) 72', 81', 83'; Eze 50'; Bloomfield (yellow card) 76'; Brown (yellow card) 86'	Report	Evina (yellow card) 33'; Connolly (yellow card) 73'	Stadium: Adams Park; Attendance: 4,494; Referee: Anthony Coggins

21 November 2017 19	Crawley Town	3–1	Exeter City	Crawley
19:45 GMT	Payne 34' (pen.), (yellow card) 90+2'; Roberts 60', 81'	Report	Moxey 23', (yellow card) 78'; Woodman (yellow card) 33'; Taylor (yellow card) 35'; Brown (yellow card) 68'; Reid (yellow card) 85'	Stadium: Broadfield Stadium; Attendance: 1,580; Referee: Andy Haines

25 November 2017 20	Coventry City	1–1	Crawley Town	Coventry
15:00 GMT	Davies (yellow card) 30'; Haynes (yellow card) 60'; McNulty 74'; McDonald (yellow card) 90+4'	Report	Randall (yellow card) 3'; Roberts 42'	Stadium: Ricoh Arena; Attendance: 6,381; Referee: Craig Hicks

9 December 2017 21	Crawley Town	2–0	Mansfield Town	Crawley
15:00 GMT	Smith (yellow card) 42'; McNerney 63'; Meite 90+1' (yellow card) 90+3'	Report	MacDonald (yellow card) 53'	Stadium: Broadfield Stadium; Attendance: 1,791; Referee: Gavin Ward

16 December 2017 22	Crewe Alexandra	3–0	Crawley Town	Crewe
15:00 GMT	Ainley 40'; Dagnall 45', 90+4'; Raynes (yellow card) 49'; Pickering (yellow card) 75'	Report	Yorwerth (yellow card) 23'; Morris (yellow card) 34'; Evina (yellow card) 56'; Roberts (yellow card) 59' (yellow-red card); Smith (red card) 61'; Meite (yellow card) 88'	Stadium: Gresty Road; Attendance: 3,155; Referee: Ben Toner

23 December 2017 23	Accrington Stanley	2–3	Crawley Town	Accrington
15:00 GMT	Kee 45+5' (pen.); Richards-Everton 53'	Report	Clark 9' (og.); Boldewijn 10', 41', (yellow card) 44'; Randall (yellow card) 27'; Yorwerth (yellow card) 39'; Meite (yellow card) 52'; Evina (yellow card) 89'; Clifford (yellow card) 89'	Stadium: Crown Ground; Attendance: 1,295; Referee: Scott Oldham

26 December 2017 24	Crawley Town	0–2	Colchester United	Crawley
15:00 GMT	Lelan (yellow card) 45+2'	Report	Mandron 4'; Kent (yellow card) 45+1'; Szmodics 57', (yellow card) 86'	Stadium: Broadfield Stadium; Attendance: 2,154; Referee: Anthony Coggins

30 December 2017 25	Crawley Town	1–0	Stevenage	Crawley
15:00 GMT	Boldewijn 33'; Payne (red card) 35'	Report	Godden (yellow card) 75'; King (yellow card) 77'; Gray (yellow card) 90+1'	Stadium: Broadfield Stadium; Attendance: 2,075; Referee: John Busby

1 January 2018 26	Yeovil Town	1–2	Crawley Town	Yeovil
15:00 GMT	Surridge 19'; Smith (yellow card) 24' (yellow-red card) 37'; Sowunmi (red card) 45+3'; Zoko (yellow card) 90+13'	Report	Roberts (yellow card) 14'; Morris (yellow card) 15'; Young (yellow card) 31'; Yorwerth (yellow card) 32'; Randall (yellow card) 38', (goal) 44'; Verheydt 90+8'	Stadium: Huish Park; Attendance: 2,635; Referee: Brett Huxtable

13 January 2018 27	Crawley Town	2–0	Barnet	Crawley
15:00 GMT	Connolly (yellow card) 11'; Randall (yellow card) 15'; Boldewijn 75', 86'	Report	Clough (yellow card) 37'; Coulthirst (yellow card) 54'	Stadium: Broadfield Stadium; Attendance: 1,874; Referee: Nick Kinseley

19 January 2018 28	Newport County	2–1	Crawley Town	Newport
19:45 GMT	Amond 40'; Demetriou 44' (pen.); Pipe (yellow card) 72'	Report	Smith 48'; Connolly (yellow card) 90'	Stadium: Rodney Parade; Attendance: 5,741; Referee: Simon Hooper

23 January 2018 29	Notts County	1–2	Crawley Town	Nottingham
19:45 GMT	Virtue (yellow card) 28' (yellow-red card) 90'; Brisley (yellow card) 45'; Stead 58' (pen.); Fitzsimons (red card) 90+3'; Hewitt (yellow card) 90+5'	Report	Smith 25'; Verheydt (yellow card) 37'; Lelan (yellow card) 48'; Payne 90+5' (pen.)	Stadium: Meadow Lane; Attendance: 3,738; Referee: Rob Lewis

27 January 2018 30	Crawley Town	2–1	Accrington Stanley	Crawley
15:00 GMT	Boldewijn 15', 33', (yellow card) 90+5'; Young (yellow card) 73'	Report	Yorwerth 57' (og.); Johnson (yellow card) 62'; Hughes (yellow card) 66'; McConville (yellow card) 85'	Stadium: Broadfield Stadium; Attendance: 2,153; Referee: Gavin Ward

3 February 2018 31	Chesterfield	1–2	Crawley Town	Chesterfield
15:00 GMT	Reed 18'; Kay (yellow card) 47'	Report	Randall (yellow card) 45+2'; Ahearne-Grant 57'; Young 90+3'	Stadium: Proact Stadium; Attendance: 5,159; Referee: Ross Joyce

10 February 2018 32	Crawley Town	3–0	Grimsby Town	Crawley
15:00 GMT	Yorwerth (yellow card) 39'; Smith 45+1' (pen.); Ahearne-Grant 62'; Boldewijn 69'	Report	Wilks (yellow card) 10'	Stadium: Broadfield Stadium; Attendance: 2,055; Referee: Kevin Johnson

13 February 2018 33	Luton Town	4–1	Crawley Town	Luton
19:45 GMT	Downes (yellow card) 15'; Lee 29'; Collins 45', 75' (pen.); Berry 55', (yellow card) 80'	Report	Payne (yellow card) 58'; Ahearne-Grant 87'	Stadium: Kenilworth Road; Attendance: 8,020; Referee: Craig Hicks

17 February 2018 34	Crawley Town	3–1	Lincoln City	Crawley
15:00 GMT	Smith 15'; Payne (yellow card) 48', (goal) 68' (pen.); Roberts (yellow card) 68'; Connolly 72'; Yorwerth (yellow card) 85'; Randall (yellow card) 86'	Report	Green (yellow card) 18', (goal) 52'; Waterfall (yellow card) 45+2'; Wharton (yellow card) 67'; Woodyard (yellow card) 90+1'	Stadium: Broadfield Stadium; Attendance: 2,809; Referee: Trevor Kettle

24 February 2018 35	Forest Green Rovers	2–0	Crawley Town	Nailsworth
15:00 GMT	Reid 10'; Doidge 24'; Osbourne (yellow card) 79'	Report	Yorwerth (yellow card) 36'; Connolly (yellow card) 90+5'	Stadium: The New Lawn; Attendance: 2,346; Referee: Andy Woolmer

10 March 2018 36	Crawley Town	1–1	Morecambe	Crawley
15:00 GMT	Payne (yellow card) 69'; Connolly (yellow card) 83'; Yorwerth (yellow card) 90'; Ahearne-Grant 90+3'	Report	Lavelle (yellow card) 59'; Lang 90+1', (yellow card) 90+2'	Stadium: Broadfield Stadium; Attendance: 1,642; Referee: Brendan Malone

17 March 2018 37	Carlisle United	2–2	Crawley Town	Carlisle
15:00 GMT	Bennett 38'; Hill (yellow card) 45+2'; Hope 47', (yellow card) 60'; Parkes (yellow card) 48'	Report	Ahearne-Grant 56', 81'; Boldewijn (yellow card) 60'	Stadium: Brunton Park; Attendance: 4,097; Referee: Martin Coy

21 March 2018 38	Crawley Town	2–3	Wycombe Wanderers	Crawley
19:45 GMT	Ahearne-Grant 33'; Payne (yellow card) 45+5'; Smith (yellow card) 56'; Camará 83'; Connolly (yellow card) 88' (yellow-red card) 91'	Report	Tyson 25'; Moore (yellow card) 31'; Akinfenwa 39'; Jombati 62'; Jacobson (yellow card) 87'	Stadium: Broadfield Stadium; Attendance: 2,133; Referee: Graham Horwood

24 March 2018 39	Crawley Town	3–5	Cheltenham Town	Crawley
15:00 GMT	Ahearne-Grant 50'; Camará 73'; Young 84'; McNerney (yellow card) 90+3'	Report	Pell 7', 12', (yellow card) 75'; Eisa 36', 47'; Boyle 53'	Stadium: Broadfield Stadium; Attendance: 2,172; Referee: Chris Sarginson

30 March 2018 40	Cambridge United	3–1	Crawley Town	Cambridge
15:00 BST	Ibehre 4'; Maris 22'; Brown 58'	Report	Payne 49' (pen.)	Stadium: Abbey Stadium; Attendance: 4,131; Referee: Craig Hicks

2 April 2018 41	Crawley Town	1–1	Swindon Town	Crawley
15:00 BST	Smith 25', (yellow card) 83'	Report	Richards (yellow card) 70', (goal) 85'	Stadium: Broadfield Stadium; Attendance: 5,008; Referee: Dean Whitestone

7 April 2018 42	Port Vale	1–2	Crawley Town	Stoke-on-Trent
15:00 BST	Pope 20', (yellow card) 22'; Smith (yellow card) 29'; Montaño (yellow card) 80'; Gibbons (yellow card) 84'	Report	Payne 29' (pen.); Tajbakhsh (yellow card) 40'; Camará (yellow card) 47'; Smith 82' (og.); Sanoh (yellow card) 90+6'	Stadium: Vale Park; Attendance: 4,005; Referee: Mike Jones

14 April 2018 43	Crawley Town	1–2	Coventry City	Crawley
15:00 BST	Young 13'; Tajbakhsh (yellow card) 29'	Report	Ponticelli 5', 77'; Doyle (yellow card) 64'	Stadium: Broadfield Stadium; Attendance: 3,294; Referee: Lee Swabey

21 April 2018 44	Exeter City	2–2	Crawley Town	Exeter
15:00 BST	Stockley 42', 57'; James (yellow card) 72'; Wilson (yellow card) 73'	Report	Boldewijn 29', (yellow card) 64'; Young (yellow card) 65'; Yorwerth 66'	Stadium: St James Park; Attendance: 3,998; Referee: Anthony Coggins

28 April 2018 45	Crawley Town	1–2	Crewe Alexandra	Crawley
15:00 BST	Smith 9'; Yorwerth (yellow card) 90+5'	Report	Ng 5'; Pickering 51'	Stadium: Broadfield Stadium; Attendance: 2,089; Referee: Tom Nield

5 May 2018 46	Mansfield Town	1–1	Crawley Town	Mansfield
15:00 BST	Hemmings 64'	Report	Ahearne-Grant 7'; Young (yellow card) 68'; Connolly (yellow card) 75'	Stadium: Field Mill; Attendance: 4,734; Referee: Ben Toner

=== FA Cup ===
Win Draw Loss

4 November 2017 First round	Wigan Athletic	2–1	Crawley Town	Wigan
15:00 GMT	Morsy (yellow card) 26'; Toney 29'; Evans 71'	Report	Roberts 20'	Stadium: DW Stadium; Attendance: 3,288; Referee: Martin Coy

=== EFL Cup ===
Win Draw Loss

On 16 June 2017, Crawley Town were drawn away to Birmingham City in the first round.

8 August 2017 First round	Birmingham City	5–1	Crawley Town	Birmingham
19:45 BST	Adams 27', 42', 66'; Davis 38'; Tesche 49'	Report	Payne (yellow card) 43'; Clifford (yellow card) 75'; Camará 86'	Stadium: St Andrew's; Attendance: 7,814; Referee: Michael Salisbury

=== EFL Trophy ===
On 12 July 2017, Crawley Town were drawn in Southern Group A against Charlton Athletic, Fulham U23s and Portsmouth.

Pos	Lge	Team	Pld	W	PW	PL	L	GF	GA	GD	Pts	Qualification
1	L1	Portsmouth (Q)	3	2	0	1	0	7	4	+3	7	Round 2
2	L1	Charlton Athletic (Q)	3	2	0	0	1	5	3	+2	6	Round 2
3	ACA	Fulham U21 (E)	3	1	1	0	1	8	7	+1	5	
4	L2	Crawley Town (E)	3	0	0	0	3	2	8	−6	0	

Updated to match(es) played on 7 November 2017. Source: EFL.com
(E) Eliminated; (Q) Qualified to the phase indicated

Win Draw Loss

29 August 2017 1	Crawley Town	0–2	Charlton Athletic	Crawley
19:45 BST	Djaló (yellow card) 10'; Yorwerth (yellow card) 43'; Sanoh (yellow card) 59'	Report	Reeves 37'; Lapslie 70'	Stadium: Broadfield Stadium; Attendance: 1,666; Referee: Nick Kinseley

3 October 2017 2	Portsmouth	3–1	Crawley Town	Portsmouth
19:45 BST	May (yellow card) 27'; Clarke 30'; Hawkins 35'; O'Keefe 71'	Report	Djaló (yellow card) 53'; Sanoh 65'	Stadium: Fratton Park; Attendance: 1,527; Referee: Tim Robinson

29 November 2017 3	Crawley Town	1–3	Fulham U23s	Crawley
19:45 GMT	Meite 74'	Report	Adebayo 31'; Graham 45', 85'	Stadium: Broadfield Stadium; Attendance: 435; Referee: John Busby

=== Sussex Senior Cup ===
31 October 2017 Second round	Crawley Town	3–1	Bognor Regis Town	Crawley
19:45 GMT	Clifford 44'; Meite 57'; Boldewijn 80'	Report	Pearce 75'	Stadium: Broadfield Stadium; Attendance: 208; Referee: Matthew Goldsmith

18 December 2017 Third round	Hastings United	0–2	Crawley Town	Hastings
19:45 GMT		Report	Lelan 5'; Meite 37'	Stadium: The Pilot Field; Attendance: 161; Referee: Steven Hughes

9 January 2018 Quarter-final	Eastbourne Borough	3–4 (a.e.t.)	Crawley Town	Eastbourne
19:45 GMT	Dawes 16', 67'; McCallum 69'	Report	Verheydt 43', 96' (pen.); Haran 58' (og.); Cox 90+4'	Stadium: Priory Lane; Attendance: 184; Referee: John Pike

6 March 2018 Semi-final	Saltdean United	0–6	Crawley Town	Lancing
19:15 GMT		Report	Smith 30', 56' (pen.), 60'; Randall 35'; Camará 54', 90'	Stadium: Culver Road; Referee: David Spain

9 May 2018 Final	Brighton & Hove Albion U23	2–1	Crawley Town	Brighton
19:45 GMT	Tilley 82'; Kerr 85'	Report	Kerr 69' (og.)	Stadium: Falmer Stadium; Attendance: 1,503; Referee: Matthew Goldsmith

== Statistics ==
=== Appearances ===
No.	Pos.	Name	League Two		FA Cup		EFL Cup		EFL Trophy		Total		Discipline	
No.	Pos.	Name	Apps	Goals	Apps	Goals	Apps	Goals	Apps	Goals	Apps	Goals	Yellow card	Red card
1	GK	(England) Glenn Morris	44	0	1	0	1	0	0	0	46	0	3	0
2	DF	(England) Lewis Young	41	3	1	0	0	0	1	0	43	3	6	0
3	DF	(Northern Ireland) Josh Doherty	11 (3)	0	1	0	0	0	1	0	13 (3)	0	0	0
4	MF	(England) Josh Payne	23 (12)	5	0	0	1	0	3	0	27 (12)	5	8	1
5	DF	(England) Joe McNerney	10 (6)	1	1	0	1	0	3	0	15 (6)	1	2	0
6	DF	(Republic of Ireland) Mark Connolly	40	2	1	0	0	0	0	0	41	2	9	1
7	FW	(Netherlands) Enzio Boldewijn	44 (1)	10	1	0	0 (1)	0	0 (1)	0	45 (3)	10	5	0
8	MF	(England) Jimmy Smith	36 (1)	10	1	0	0	0	0 (1)	0	37 (2)	10	5	1
9	MF	(England) Karlan Ahearne-Grant	15	9	0	0	0	0	0	0	15	9	0	0
10	MF	(England) Dean Cox	3 (1)	0	0	0	1	0	0	0	4 (1)	0	1	0
11	MF	(England) Jordan Roberts	25 (10)	6	1	1	0	0	0	0	26 (10)	7	7	1
12	GK	(Turkey) Yusuf Mersin	2	0	0	0	0	0	3	0	5	0	0	0
15	DF	(Wales) Josh Yorwerth	37 (2)	1	0	0	1	0	3	0	41 (2)	1	11	1
17	MF	(Guinea-Bissau) Kaby Djaló	1 (1)	0	0	0	1	0	3	0	5 (1)	0	2	0
18	MF	(England) Billy Clifford	4 (3)	1	0 (1)	0	0 (1)	0	1 (2)	0	5 (7)	1	2	0
19	DF	(Cameroon) Cedric Evina	32 (2)	0	0	0	0	0	0	0	32 (2)	0	5	0
20	MF	(England) Aryan Tajbakhsh	8 (9)	0	0 (1)	0	1	0	1 (2)	0	10 (12)	0	2	0
21	MF	(England) Dannie Bulman	34 (3)	0	1	0	0	0	2	0	37 (3)	0	2	0
22	DF	(Kenya) Josh Lelan	29 (2)	0	1	0	0	0	1	0	31 (2)	0	4	0
23	FW	(Netherlands) Thomas Verheydt	16 (4)	2	0 (1)	0	0	0	1	0	17 (5)	2	1	0
25	MF	(England) Mark Randall	24 (8)	1	0	0	0	0	1	0	25 (8)	1	8	0
27	MF	(Netherlands) Moussa Sanoh	4 (8)	0	0	0	1	0	1 (2)	1	6 (10)	1	3	0
28	FW	(Guinea-Bissau) Panutche Camará	14 (15)	2	1	0	0 (1)	1	3	0	18 (16)	3	1	0
Players who left the club in August/January transfer window or on loan
9	FW	(England) Matt Harrold	0 (2)	0	0	0	1	0	0	0	1 (2)	0	0	0
14	DF	(England) Andre Blackman	0	0	0	0	1	0	0	0	1	0	0	0
16	DF	(England) Addison Garnett	0	0	0	0	0	0	0	0	0	0	0	0
24	MF	(England) Dennon Lewis	3 (7)	0	0	0	1	0	2 (1)	0	6 (8)	0	1	0
26	FW	(England) Ibrahim Meite	6 (13)	2	0	0	0	0	3	1	9 (13)	3	4	0
29	DF	(Poland) Nathan Okoye	0	0	0	0	0	0	0	0	0	0	0	0

Last updated: 5 May 2018.
Source: Crawley Town F.C.

=== Top scorers ===
The list is sorted by shirt number when total goals are equal.

Rnk	Pos	No.	Player	League Two	FA Cup	EFL Cup	EFL Trophy	Total
1	FW	7	(Netherlands) Enzio Boldewijn	10	0	0	0	10
1	MF	8	(England) Jimmy Smith	10	0	0	0	10
3	MF	9	(England) Karlan Ahearne-Grant	9	0	0	0	9
4	MF	11	(England) Jordan Roberts	6	1	0	0	7
5	MF	4	(England) Josh Payne	5	0	0	0	5
6	DF	2	(England) Lewis Young	3	0	0	0	3
6	FW	26	(England) Ibrahim Meite	2	0	0	1	3
6	FW	28	(Guinea-Bissau) Panutche Camará	2	0	1	0	3
9	DF	6	(Republic of Ireland) Mark Connolly	2	0	0	0	2
9	FW	23	(Netherlands) Thomas Verheydt	2	0	0	0	2
11	DF	5	(England) Joe McNerney	1	0	0	0	1
11	DF	15	(Wales) Josh Yorwerth	1	0	0	0	1
11	MF	18	(England) Billy Clifford	1	0	0	0	1
11	MF	25	(England) Mark Randall	1	0	0	0	1
11	MF	27	(Netherlands) Moussa Sanoh	0	0	0	1	1
Own goals				3	0	0	0	3
Total				58	1	1	2	62

Last updated: 5 May 2018.
Source: Crawley Town F.C.

=== Clean sheets ===
The list is sorted by shirt number when total appearances are equal.

Rnk	No.	Player	League Two	FA Cup	EFL Cup	EFL Trophy	Total
1	1	(England) Glenn Morris	10	0	0	0	10
2	12	(Turkey) Yusuf Mersin	0	0	0	0	0
Total			10	0	0	0	10

Last updated: 13 February 2018.
Source: Crawley Town F.C.

=== Summary ===
Games played	51 (46 League Two) (1 FA Cup) (1 EFL Cup) (3 EFL Trophy)
Games won	16 (16 League Two)
Games drawn	11 (11 League Two)
Games lost	24 (19 League Two) (1 FA Cup) (1 EFL Cup) (3 EFL Trophy)
Goals scored	62 (58 League Two) (1 FA Cup) (1 EFL Cup) (2 EFL Trophy)
Goals conceded	81 (66 League Two) (2 FA Cup) (5 EFL Cup) (8 EFL Trophy)
Goal difference	–19 (−8 League Two) (−1 FA Cup) (−4 EFL Cup) (−6 EFL Trophy)
Clean sheets	10 (10 League Two)
Yellow cards	94 (88 League Two) (2 EFL Cup) (4 EFL Trophy)
Red cards	5 (5 League Two)
Most appearances	(Netherlands) Enzio Boldewijn (48 appearances)
Top scorer	(Netherlands) Enzio Boldewijn (10 goals) (England) Jimmy Smith (10 goals)
Winning Percentage	Overall: 16/51 (31.37%)

Last updated: 5 May 2018.
Source: Crawley Town F.C.
