= Ibrahim Meité =

Ibrahim Meité is the name of:

- Ibrahim Meite (footballer), English footballer
- Ibrahim Meité (sprinter), Ivorian sprinter
