= 2015–16 Northampton Town F.C. season =

Northampton Town
2015–16 season
- Chairman: David Cardoza; Kelvin Thomas (from 26 November 2015)
- Manager: Chris Wilder
- Stadium: Sixfields Stadium
- League Two: 1st
- FA Cup: Third round
- League Cup: Second round
- Football League Trophy: Second round
- Top goalscorer: League: Marc Richards (15); All: Marc Richards (18)
- Highest home attendance: 7,664 vs Luton Town
- Lowest home attendance: 1,366 vs Colchester United
- Average home league attendance: 5,279
Home colours	Away colours	Third colours

The 2015–16 season was Northampton Town's 119th season in their history and the seventh successive season in League Two. Alongside competing in League Two, the club also participated in the FA Cup, League Cup and Football League Trophy.

== Players ==
As of match played 7 May 2016.

No.	Name	Position	Nat.	Place of birth	Date of birth (age)	Apps	Goals	Previous club	Date signed	Fee
Goalkeepers
1	Adam Smith	GK	(England)	Sunderland	23 November 1992 (aged 23)	50	0	Leicester City	26 June 2015	Free
26	Ryan Clarke	GK	(England)	Bristol	30 April 1982 (aged 34)	4	0	Oxford United	2 July 2015	Free
Defenders
2	Brendan Moloney	RB	(Republic of Ireland)	Beaufort	18 January 1989 (aged 27)	51	2	Yeovil Town	2 January 2015	Free
5	Zander Diamond	CB	(Scotland)	Alexandria	13 March 1985 (aged 31)	79	4	Burton Albion	7 May 2014	Free
6	Ryan Cresswell	CB	(England)	Rotherham	22 December 1987 (aged 28)	67	7	Fleetwood Town	1 September 2014	Undisclosed
12	Josh Lelan	RB	(England)	Derby	21 December 1994 (aged 21)	13	0	Derby County	2 June 2015	Free
16	David Buchanan	LB	(Northern Ireland)	Rochdale (ENG)	6 May 1986 (aged 30)	54	0	Preston North End	28 May 2015	Free
18	Rod McDonald	CB	(England)	Liverpool	11 April 1992 (aged 24)	28	3	Telford United	28 July 2015	Free
22	Luke Prosser	CB	(England)	Enfield	28 May 1988 (aged 27)	8	0	Southend United	28 January 2016	Loan
Midfielders
4	Jason Taylor	CM	(England)	Droylsden	28 January 1987 (aged 29)	56	2	Cheltenham Town	1 January 2015	Free
7	Lawson D'Ath	W	(England)	Witney	24 December 1992 (aged 23)	91	13	Reading	7 August 2014	Free
8	Joel Byrom	CM	(England)	Oswaldtwistle	14 September 1986 (aged 29)	83	5	Preston North End	8 January 2015	Free
10	Nicky Adams	W	(Wales)	Bolton (ENG)	16 October 1986 (aged 29)	45	3	Bury	22 May 2015	Free
11	Ricky Holmes	W	(England)	Rochford	19 June 1987 (aged 28)	53	16	Portsmouth	27 January 2015	Free
15	Alfie Potter	W	(England)	London	9 January 1989 (aged 27)	26	1	A.F.C. Wimbledon	20 May 2015	Free
17	Paul Corry	CM	(Republic of Ireland)	Dublin	3 February 1991 (aged 25)	4	0	Sheffield Wednesday	3 August 2015	Free
20	Lee Martin	W	(England)	Taunton	9 February 1987 (aged 29)	10	0	Millwall	15 January 2016	Loan
21	John-Joe O'Toole	CM	(Republic of Ireland)	Harrow (ENG)	30 September 1988 (aged 27)	83	14	Bristol Rovers	30 June 2014	Free
23	Danny Rose	CM	(England)	Bristol	21 February 1988 (aged 28)	15	1	Oxford United	1 February 2016	Free
24	Shaun McWilliams	CM	(England)	Northampton	14 August 1998 (aged 17)	0	0	Academy	30 April 2016	N/A
Forwards
9	Marc Richards (c)	CF	(England)	Wolverhampton	8 July 1982 (aged 33)	139	49	Chesterfield	14 May 2014	Free
14	Sam Hoskins	CF	(England)	Dorchester	4 February 1993 (aged 23)	41	8	Yeovil Town	1 August 2015	Free
19	James Collins	CF	(Republic of Ireland)	Coventry (ENG)	1 December 1990 (aged 25)	21	8	Shrewsbury Town	5 January 2016	Loan
27	John Marquis	CF	(England)	Lewisham	16 May 1992 (aged 23)	29	8	Millwall	22 February 2016	Loan

== Pre-season ==
On 8 May 2015, Northampton Town announced they would face Worthing and Burgess Hill Town in a pre-season friendly. On 15 May 2015, Northampton Town confirmed they would kick-off pre-season against Northampton Sileby Rangers. On 19 May 2015, Northampton Town announced Derby County will visit in pre-season. On 12 June 2015, Northampton Town announced they will visit Sheffield.

5 July 2015 Friendly	Northampton Sileby Rangers	0–1	Northampton Town	Northampton
15:00 BST		Report	S.Hoskins 26'	Stadium: Fernie Fields; Referee: Andy Woolmer

7 July 2015 Friendly	Worthing	2–5	Northampton Town	Worthing
19:30 BST	Pope 12'; Bugil 64' (pen.)	Report	G.Ugwu 5'; R.Holmes 20'; S.Hoskins 36'; M.Richards 55'; J.Byrom 78'	Stadium: Woodside Road; Attendance: 750

11 July 2015 Friendly	Burgess Hill Town	0–0	Northampton Town	Burgess Hill
15:00 BST		Report		Stadium: Leylands Park; Attendance: 506

18 July 2015 Friendly	Northampton Town	0–1	Derby County	Northampton
14:00 BST		Report	J.Russell 33'	Stadium: Sixfields Stadium; Attendance: 2,542 (1,226)

21 July 2015 Friendly	Northampton Town	2–2	Birmingham City	Northampton
19:30 BST	N.Adams 45', 59'	Report	D.Gray 3'; L.Novak 68'	Stadium: Sixfields Stadium; Attendance: 1,675 (514)

31 July 2015 Friendly	Sheffield	0–3	Northampton Town	Dronfield
19:45 BST		Report	M.Richards 61'; Trialist 71'; R.Holmes 81'	Stadium: Coach and Horses Ground; Attendance: 155; Referee: Anthony Tankard

== Competitions ==
=== Football League Two ===
==== League table ====
Pos	Team	Pld	W	D	L	GF	GA	GD	Pts	Promotion, qualification or relegation
1	Northampton Town (C, P)	46	29	12	5	82	46	+36	99	Promotion to EFL League One
2	Oxford United (P)	46	24	14	8	84	41	+43	86	Promotion to EFL League One
3	Bristol Rovers (P)	46	26	7	13	77	46	+31	85	Promotion to EFL League One
4	Accrington Stanley	46	24	13	9	74	48	+26	85	Qualification for League Two play-offs (Note: Four teams play for one spot and promotion to Football League One.)
5	Plymouth Argyle	46	24	9	13	72	46	+26	81	Qualification for League Two play-offs

Updated to match(es) played on 7 May 2016. Source: BBC Sport
Rules for classification: 1) Points; 2) Goal difference; 3) Number of goals scored
(C) Champions; (P) Promoted

==== Results summary ====
Overall								Home						Away					
Pld	W	D	L	GF	GA	GD	Pts	W	D	L	GF	GA	GD	W	D	L	GF	GA	GD
46	29	12	5	82	46	+36	99	15	5	3	38	19	+19	14	7	2	44	27	+17

Last updated: 9 May 2016.
Source: League Two

==== League position by match ====
Round	1	2	3	4	5	6	7	8	9	10	11	12	13	14	15	16	17	18	19	20	21	22	23	24	25	26	27	28	29	30	31	32	33	34	35	36	37	38	39	40	41	42	43	44	45	46
Ground	A	H	A	H	A	H	H	A	H	A	A	H	A	H	H	A	H	A	A	H	A	H	H	H	A	A	H	H	A	A	H	A	A	H	A	H	A	H	A	H	H	A	H	A	H	A
Result	W	W	L	L	D	L	W	W	D	D	W	W	L	W	W	D	W	W	W	W	W	L	W	W	W	W	W	W	W	W	W	W	D	D	W	D	W	W	D	D	D	D	W	D	W	W
Position	9	4	7	10	11	16	11	8	8	10	9	8	9	5	4	5	3	3	3	3	1	2	2	2	2	2	1	1	1	1	1	1	1	1	1	1	1	1	1	1	1	1	1	1	1	1

Source: Northampton Town F.C.
A = Away; H = Home; W = Win; D = Draw; L = Loss

==== Matches ====
Win Draw Loss

On 17 June 2015, the fixtures for the forthcoming season were announced.

8 August 2015 1	Bristol Rovers	0–1	Northampton Town	Horfield
15:00 BST		Report; Highlights	JJ.O'Toole 49'	Stadium: Memorial Stadium; Attendance: 8,712 (574); Referee: Mark Heywood

15 August 2015 2	Northampton Town	3–0	Exeter City	Northampton
15:00 BST	J.Taylor 25'; R.Cresswell 38'; M.Richards 89'	Report; Highlights		Stadium: Sixfields Stadium; Attendance: 4,313 (316); Referee: Ross Joyce

18 August 2015 3	Barnet	2–0	Northampton Town	Canons Park
19:45 BST	J.Akinde 63' (pen.), 90'	Report; Highlights	J.Taylor (red card) 63'	Stadium: The Hive Stadium; Attendance: 2,466 (922); Referee: Lee Swabey

22 August 2015 4	Northampton Town	0–2	Plymouth Argyle	Northampton
15:00 BST	J.Lelan (red card) 90'	Report; Highlights	G.Carey 39'; J.Jervis 71'	Stadium: Sixfields Stadium; Attendance: 4,505 (710); Referee: Nick Kinseley

29 August 2015 5	Accrington Stanley	1–1	Northampton Town	Accrington
15:00 BST	J.Windass 55' (pen.)	Report; Highlights	M.Richards 39'	Stadium: Crown Ground; Attendance: 1,526 (292); Referee: Seb Stockbridge

5 September 2015 6	Northampton Town	1–2	Dagenham & Redbridge	Northampton
15:00 BST	M.Richards 23'	Report; Highlights	M.McClure 28', 39'	Stadium: Sixfields Stadium; Attendance: 4,032 (121); Referee: Charles Breakspear

12 September 2015 7	Northampton Town	1–0	Oxford United	Northampton
15:00 BST	S.Hoskins 23'; J.Taylor (red card) 45'	Report; Highlights		Stadium: Sixfields Stadium; Attendance: 4,838 (931); Referee: Neil Swarbrick

19 September 2015 8	Morecambe	2–4	Northampton Town	Morecambe
15:00 BST	T.Barkhuizen 67'; J.Byrom 86' (o.g.)	Report; Highlights	L.D'Ath 31'; S.Hoskins 34'; J.Byrom 48'; D.Calvert-Lewin 69'	Stadium: Globe Arena; Attendance: 1,778 (327); Referee: Eddie Ilderton

26 September 2015 9	Northampton Town	1–1	Leyton Orient	Northampton
15:00 BST	D.Calvert-Lewin 90'	Report; Highlights	D.Cox 90'	Stadium: Sixfields Stadium; Attendance: 5,061 (800); Referee: Michael Bull

29 September 2015 10	Wimbledon	1–1	Northampton Town	Kingston upon Thames
19:45 BST	A.Azeez 24'	Report; Highlights	JJ.O'Toole 35'	Stadium: Kingsmeadow; Attendance: 3,525 (309); Referee: Andy Haines

3 October 2015 11	Wycombe Wanderers	2–3	Northampton Town	High Wycombe
15:00 BST	L.O'Nien 2'; D.Rowe 82'	Report; Highlights	M.Richards 35'; L.D'Ath 47'; S.Brisley 51'	Stadium: Adams Park; Attendance: 4,227 (597); Referee: Keith Hill

10 October 2015 12	Northampton Town	2–1	Hartlepool United	Northampton
15:00 BST	M.Richards 4'; N.Adams 21'	Report; Highlights	R.Bingham 31'	Stadium: Sixfields Stadium; Attendance: 4,477 (204); Referee: Kevin Johnson

17 October 2015 13	Cambridge United	2–1	Northampton Town	Cambridge
15:00 BST	H.Dunk 39'; B.Corr 50'	Report; Highlights	M.Richards 59' (pen.); L.D'Ath (red card) 76'	Stadium: Abbey Stadium; Attendance: 5,459 (1,299); Referee: Darren England

20 October 2015 14	Northampton Town	3–2	Carlisle United	Northampton
19:45 BST	D.Calvert-Lewin 45+2', 63'; S.Hoskins 47'	Report; Highlights	A.Gilliead 31'; C.Wyke 90+2'	Stadium: Sixfields Stadium; Attendance: 3,642 (254); Referee: Graham Horwood

24 October 2015 15	Northampton Town	2–1	Stevenage	Northampton
15:00 BST	D.Calvert-Lewin 49'; A.Potter 62'	Report; Highlights	S.Schumacher 24'	Stadium: Sixfields Stadium; Attendance: 4,492 (334); Referee: Geoff Eltringham

31 October 2015 16	Newport County	2–2	Northampton Town	Newport
15:00 GMT	S.Barrow 31'; L.John-Lewis 38'	Report; Highlights	S.Hoskins 10'; M.Richards 30'	Stadium: Rodney Parade; Attendance: 2,424 (352); Referee: Darren Deadman

14 November 2015 17	Northampton Town	1–0	Mansfield Town	Northampton
15:00 GMT	M.Richards 4'	Report; Highlights		Stadium: Sixfields Stadium; Attendance: 5,454 (892); Referee: Darren Bond

21 November 2015 18	Notts County	1–2	Northampton Town	Nottingham
15:00 GMT	J.Stead 52'	Report; Highlights	R.McDonald 31'; B.Moloney 76'	Stadium: Meadow Lane; Attendance: 5,513 (999); Referee: Andy Davies

24 November 2015 19	Crawley Town	1–2	Northampton Town	Crawley
19:45 GMT	S.Walton 61' (pen.)	Report; Highlights	J.Byrom 6'; JJ.O'Toole 20'; B.Moloney (red card) 59'	Stadium: Broadfield Stadium; Attendance: 2,325 (381); Referee: Steve Martin

28 November 2015 20	Northampton Town	2–0	Yeovil Town	Northampton
15:00 GMT	L.D'Ath 35'; M.Richards 57'	Report; Highlights		Stadium: Sixfields Stadium; Attendance: 4,989 (199); Referee: James Linington

12 December 2015 21	Luton Town	3–4	Northampton Town	Luton
15:00 GMT	P.Benson 9', 52'; D.Green 66' (pen.)	Report; Highlights	JJ.O'Toole 18'; L.D'Ath 30'; M.Richards 42'; R.Holmes 69'	Stadium: Kenilworth Road; Attendance: 8,792 (1,032); Referee: Mike Jones

19 December 2015 22	Northampton Town	1–2	Portsmouth	Northampton
15:00 GMT	R.Cresswell 17'	Report; Highlights	G.Evans 33'; C.Chaplin 85'	Stadium: Sixfields Stadium; Attendance: 5,859 (938); Referee: Fred Graham

28 December 2015 23	Northampton Town	1–0	Accrington Stanley	Northampton
15:00 GMT	M.Richards 63'	Report; Highlights		Stadium: Sixfields Stadium; Attendance: 5,269 (141); Referee: Nicholas Kinseley

2 January 2016 24	Northampton Town	3–0	Barnet	Northampton
15:00 GMT	S.Hoskins 5'; R.Holmes 52'; M.Richards 60'	Report; Highlights		Stadium: Sixfields Stadium; Attendance: 5,153 (398); Referee: Ross Joyce

12 January 2016 25	Plymouth Argyle	1–2	Northampton Town	Plymouth
19:45 GMT	G.Wylde 83'	Report; Highlights	J.Collins 38'; M.Richards 58'	Stadium: Home Park; Attendance: 9,241 (269); Referee: Keith Stroud

16 January 2016 26	Dag & Red	1–2	Northampton Town	Dagenham
15:00 GMT	C.Doidge 62'	Report; Highlights	JJ.O'Toole 70'; R.Holmes 79'	Stadium: Victoria Road; Attendance: 2,379 (892); Referee: Iain Williamson

23 January 2016 27	Northampton Town	3–1	Morecambe	Northampton
15:00 GMT	J.Collins 30'; JJ.O'Toole 40'; R.McDonald 51'	Report; Highlights	P.Mullin 72'	Stadium: Sixfields Stadium; Attendance: 4,652 (96); Referee: Gavin Ward

6 February 2016 28	Northampton Town	2–0	York City	Northampton
15:00 GMT	JJ.O'Toole 21'; M.Richards 54'	Report; Highlights	L.Hendrie (red card) 56'	Stadium: Sixfields Stadium; Attendance: 5,342 (349); Referee: Brendan Malone

13 February 2016 29	Leyton Orient	0–4	Northampton Town	Leyton
15:00 GMT		Report; Highlights	R.McDonald 54'; R.Holmes 64'; J.Collins 84', 90+1'	Stadium: Brisbane Road; Attendance: 6,131 (1,135); Referee: Paul Tierney

16 February 2016 30	Oxford United	0–1	Northampton Town	Oxford
19:45 GMT		Report; Highlights	M.Richards 59' (pen.)	Stadium: Kassam Stadium; Attendance: 9,559 (1,943); Referee: Keith Hill

20 February 2016 31	Northampton Town	1–0	Wycombe Wanderers	Northampton
15:00 GMT	D.Rose 63'	Report; Highlights		Stadium: Sixfields Stadium; Attendance: 5,755 (809); Referee: Graham Sailsbury

23 February 2016 32	York City	1–2	Northampton Town	York
19:45 GMT	R.Penn 90+3'	Report; Highlights	J.Collins 40'; J.Marquis 51'	Stadium: Bootham Crescent; Attendance: 2,887 (434); Referee: Seb Stockbridge

27 February 2016 33	Hartlepool United	0–0	Northampton Town	Hartlepool
15:00 GMT		Report; Highlights		Stadium: Victoria Park; Attendance: 4,012 (402); Referee: Mark Haywood

1 March 2016 34	Northampton Town	1–1	AFC Wimbledon	Northampton
19:45 GMT	JJ.O'Toole 45'	Report; Highlights	L.Taylor 62'	Stadium: Sixfields Stadium; Attendance: 5,124 (376); Referee: Philip Gibbs

5 March 2016 35	Carlisle United	1–4	Northampton Town	Carlisle
15:00 GMT	H.Hope 47'	Report; Highlights	J.Marquis 16'; JJ.O'Toole 33', 59'; J.Collins 74'	Stadium: Brunton Park; Attendance: 4,892 (457); Referee: David Coote

12 March 2016 36	Northampton Town	1–1	Cambridge United	Northampton
15:00 GMT	J.Marquis 71'	Report; Highlights	J.Spencer 90+1'	Stadium: Sixfields Stadium; Attendance: 5,828 (901); Referee: Rob Lewis

19 March 2016 37	Stevenage	2–3	Northampton Town	Stevenage
15:00 GMT	L.Wilkinson 11', 30'; F.Franks (red card) 79'	Report; Highlights	J.Collins 41'; JJ.O'Toole 51'; R.Holmes 90+5'	Stadium: The Lamex Stadium; Attendance: 3,902 (1,362); Referee: David Webb

25 March 2016 38	Northampton Town	1–0	Newport County	Northampton
15:00 GMT	J.Marquis 22'	Report; Highlights		Stadium: Sixfields Stadium; Attendance: 5,630 (222); Referee: Chris Sarginson

28 March 2016 39	Mansfield Town	2–2	Northampton Town	Mansfield
15:00 GMT	M.Green 12', 16'; J.McGuire (red card) 45+5'	Report; Highlights	R.Holmes 64' (pen.); J.Marquis 68'	Stadium: Field Mill; Attendance: 4,367 (1,667); Referee: Darren Handley

2 April 2016 40	Northampton Town	2–2	Notts County	Northampton
15:00 GMT	R.Holmes 32', 76' (pen.)	Report; Highlights	T.Audel 36'; J.Stead 72' (pen.)	Stadium: Sixfields Stadium; Attendance: 6,428 (438); Referee: Ben Toner

9 April 2016 41	Northampton Town	2–2	Bristol Rovers	Northampton
15:00 BST	N.Adams 23'; S.Hoskins 49'	Report; Highlights	M.Taylor 76'; E.Harrison 88'	Stadium: Sixfields Stadium; Attendance: 7,579 (925); Referee: Tony Harrington
Note: New Ground Record Attendance for a League Game at Sixfields

16 April 2016 42	Exeter City	0–0	Northampton Town	Exeter
15:00 GMT		Report; Highlights		Stadium: St James Park; Attendance: 5,077 (876*); Referee: Oliver Langford

19 April 2016 43	Northampton Town	2–1	Crawley Town	Northampton
19:45 BST	R.Holmes 48' (pen.); JJ.O'Toole 80'	Report; Highlights	G.Edwards 85'; A.Bond (red card) 86'	Stadium: Sixfields Stadium; Attendance: 5,327 (50); Referee: Iain Williamson

23 April 2016 44	Yeovil Town	1–1	Northampton Town	Yeovil
15:00 GMT	H.Cornick 6'	Report; Highlights	N.Adams 35'	Stadium: Huish Park; Attendance: 4,008 (754); Referee: Charles Breakspear

30 April 2016 45	Northampton Town	2–0	Luton Town	Northampton
15:00 BST	Z.Diamond 4'; J.Marquis 36'	Report; Highlights		Stadium: Sixfields Stadium; Attendance: 7,664 (841); Referee: Darren Bond
Note: New Ground Record Attendance for a League Game at Sixfields

7 May 2016 46	Portsmouth	1–2	Northampton Town	Portsmouth
15:00 GMT	K.Freeman (red card) 47'; K.Naismith 48'	Report; Highlights	J.Whatmough 14' (o.g.); J.Collins 81'	Stadium: Fratton Park; Attendance: 18,746 (2,807); Referee: Mark Brown

=== FA Cup ===
On 26 October 2015, the first round draw was made, Northampton Town were drawn at away against Coventry City.

7 November 2015 First round	Coventry City	1–2	Northampton Town	Coventry
15:00 GMT	J.Murphy 10'	Report	Z.Diamond 5'; M.Richards 18'	Stadium: Ricoh Arena; Attendance: 9,124 (2,509); Referee: Darren Handley

5 December 2015 Second round	Northampton Town	3–2	Northwich Victoria	Northampton
15:00 GMT	S.Hoskins 83'; J.Taylor 85'; D.Calvert-Lewin 87'	Report	J.Ball 44'; R.Bennett 63'	Stadium: Sixfields Stadium; Attendance: 3,837 (359); Referee: Paul Tierney

9 January 2016 Third round	Northampton Town	2–2	Milton Keynes Dons	Northampton
15:00 GMT	R.Holmes 49', 58'	Report	R.Cresswell 13' (o.g.); N.Maynard 82'	Stadium: Sixfields Stadium; Attendance: 5,878 (947); Referee: Darren Drysdale

19 January 2016 Third round (r)	Milton Keynes Dons	3–0	Northampton Town	Bletchley
19:45 GMT	B.Reeves 53' (pen.); J.Murphy 61'; S.Church 89' (pen.)	Report; Highlights		Stadium: Stadium MK; Attendance: 15,133 (7,040); Referee: Tony Harrington

=== League Cup ===
On 16 June 2015, the first round draw was made, Northampton Town were drawn at home against Blackpool.

11 August 2015 First round	Northampton Town	3–0	Blackpool	Northampton
19:45 BST	C.Hackett 20'; D.Calvert-Lewin 24'; S.Hoskins 29'	Report; Highlights		Stadium: Sixfields Stadium; Attendance: 2,549 (305); Referee: James Adcock

25 August 2015 Second round	Newcastle United	4–1	Northampton Town	Newcastle
19:45 BST	F.Thauvin 3'; S.de Jong 8'; D.Janmaat 56'; M.Williamson 63'	Report; Highlights	M.Richards 10' (pen.)	Stadium: St James' Park; Attendance: 26,923 (989); Referee: David Coote

=== Football League Trophy ===
On 8 August 2015, live on Soccer AM the draw for the first round of the Football League Trophy was drawn by Toni Duggan and Alex Scott. Cobblers will host Colchester United. On 5 September 2015, the second round draw was shown live on Soccer AM and drawn by Charlie Austin and Ed Skrein. Northampton were drawn away to Millwall.

1 September 2015 First round (s)	Northampton Town	3–2	Colchester United	Northampton
19:45 BST	D.Calvert-Lewin 9'; R.Watson 49'; M.Richards 85'	Report; Highlights	M.Bonne 32', 82'	Stadium: Sixfields Stadium; Attendance: 1,366 (111); Referee: Darren Deadman

6 October 2015 Second round (s)	Millwall	2–0	Northampton Town	Bermondsey
19:45 BST	A.O'Brien 71'; L.Gregory 75'	Report; Highlights		Stadium: The Den; Attendance: 2,254 (212); Referee: Iain Williamson

=== Appearances, goals and cards ===
No.	Pos	Player	League Two			FA Cup			League Cup			League Trophy			Total			Discipline	
No.	Pos	Player	Starts	Sub	Goals	Starts	Sub	Goals	Starts	Sub	Goals	Starts	Sub	Goals	Starts	Sub	Goals	Booked	Sent off (straight red)
1	GK	Adam Smith	46	–	–	4	–	–	–	–	–	–	–	–	50	–	–	2	–
2	RB	Brendan Moloney	25	–	1	4	–	–	–	–	–	–	–	–	29	–	1	3	1
4	CM	Jason Taylor	8	21	1	2	1	1	1	–	–	1	1	–	12	23	2	2	2
5	CB	Zander Diamond	37	2	1	3	–	1	1	–	–	–	–	–	41	2	2	4	–
6	CB	Ryan Cresswell	18	6	2	2	1	–	2	–	–	2	–	–	24	7	2	6	–
7	RM	Lawson D'Ath	25	14	4	2	1	–	1	1	–	2	–	–	30	16	4	3	1
8	CM	Joel Byrom	33	2	2	3	–	–	2	–	–	–	–	–	38	2	2	3	–
9	ST	Marc Richards	28	3	15	3	1	1	1	–	1	–	1	1	32	5	18	2	–
10	W	Nicky Adams	34	5	3	4	–	–	1	–	–	–	1	–	39	6	3	4	–
11	W	Ricky Holmes	20	8	9	2	1	2	–	1	–	–	–	–	22	10	11	3	–
12	RB	Josh Lelan	10	1	–	–	–	–	1	–	–	–	1	–	11	2	–	4	1
14	ST	Sam Hoskins	16	18	6	2	2	1	1	1	1	1	1	–	20	22	8	–	–
15	W	Alfie Potter	12	9	1	2	–	–	1	1	–	1	–	–	16	10	1	1	–
16	LB	David Buchanan	46	–	–	4	–	–	2	–	–	2	–	–	54	–	–	3	–
17	CM	Paul Corry	–	3	–	–	–	–	–	–	–	1	–	–	1	3	–	–	–
18	CB	Rod McDonald	21	2	3	3	–	–	1	–	–	1	–	–	26	2	3	4	–
19	ST	James Collins	17	4	8	–	–	–	–	–	–	–	–	–	17	4	8	3	–
20	W	Lee Martin	9	1	–	–	–	–	–	–	–	–	–	–	9	1	–	3	–
21	CM	John-Joe O'Toole	36	2	12	3	–	–	–	1	–	1	–	–	40	3	12	12	–
22	CB	Luke Prosser	7	1	–	–	–	–	–	–	–	–	–	–	7	1	–	1	–
23	CM	Danny Rose	13	2	1	–	–	–	–	–	–	–	–	–	13	2	1	2	–
24	CM	Shaun McWilliams	–	–	–	–	–	–	–	–	–	–	–	–	–	–	–	–	–
26	GK	Ryan Clarke	–	–	–	–	–	–	2	–	–	2	–	–	4	–	–	–	–
27	ST	John Marquis	13	2	6	–	–	–	–	–	–	–	–	–	13	2	6	3	–
Players no longer at the club:
3	LB	Evan Horwood	–	–	–	–	–	–	–	–	–	–	–	–	–	–	–	–	–
19	CM	Ryan Watson	4	7	–	–	1	–	1	–	–	2	–	1	7	8	1	2	–
20	ST	Dominic Calvert-Lewin	7	13	5	1	1	1	1	1	1	2	–	1	11	15	8	3	–
22	RM	Chris Hackett	2	4	–	–	1	–	1	–	1	1	–	–	4	5	1	–	–
23	RB	Adam Yates	1	–	–	–	–	–	1	–	–	1	–	–	3	–	–	1	–
24	RB	Darnell Furlong	10	–	–	–	–	–	–	–	–	1	–	–	11	–	–	2	–
25	CB	Shaun Brisley	9	–	1	–	–	–	–	–	–	1	–	–	10	–	1	1	–
28	CM	Danny Clifton	–	–	–	–	–	–	–	–	–	–	–	–	–	–	–	–	–
29	LB	Sam Warburton	–	–	–	–	–	–	–	–	–	–	–	–	–	–	–	–	–

=== Clean sheets ===
Includes all competitive matches.

As of match played 7 May 2016

No.	Nat.	Player	Matches Played	Clean Sheet %	League Two	FA Cup	League Cup	JPT	TOTAL
1	(England)	Adam Smith	50	30%	15	0	0	0	15
26	(England)	Ryan Clarke	4	25%	0	0	1	0	1
Totals			54	30%	15	0	1	0	16

=== Scores overview ===
Northampton Town' score given first.

Win Draw Loss

Opposition	Home score	Away score	Double
Accrington Stanley	1 – 0	1 – 1	No
AFC Wimbledon	1 – 1	1 – 1	No
Barnet	3 – 0	0 – 2	No
Bristol Rovers	2 – 2	1 – 0	No
Cambridge United	1 – 1	1 – 2	No
Carlisle United	3 – 2	4 – 1	Yes
Crawley Town	2 – 1	2 – 1	Yes
Dagenham & Redbridge	1 – 2	2 – 1	No
Exeter City	3 – 0	0 – 0	No
Hartlepool United	2 – 1	0 – 0	No
Leyton Orient	1 – 1	4 – 0	No
Luton Town	1 – 0	4 – 3	Yes
Mansfield Town	2 – 0	2 – 2	No
Morecambe	3 – 1	4 – 2	Yes
Newport County	1 – 0	2 – 2	No
Notts County	2 – 2	2 – 1	No
Oxford United	1 – 0	1 – 0	Yes
Plymouth Argyle	0 – 2	2 – 1	No
Portsmouth	1 – 2	2 – 1	No
Stevenage	2 – 1	3 – 2	Yes
Wycombe Wanderers	1 – 0	3 – 2	Yes
Yeovil Town	2 – 0	1 – 1	No
York City	2 – 0	2 – 1	Yes

== Awards ==
=== Club awards ===
At the end of the season, Northampton's annual award ceremony, including categories voted for by the players and backroom staff, the supporters, will see the players recognised for their achievements for the club throughout the 2015–16 season.

Player of the Year Award	John-Joe O'Toole
Players' Player of the Year Award	Adam Smith
Academy Player of the Year Award	James Hammond
Goal of the Season Award	Ricky Holmes (vs. Leyton Orient)

=== Divisional awards ===
Date	Nation	Winner	Award
January 2016	(England)	Ricky Holmes	Football League Two Player of the Month
November 2015	(England)	Chris Wilder	Football League Two Manager of the Month
January 2016	(England)	Chris Wilder	Football League Two Manager of the Month
February 2016	(England)	Chris Wilder	Football League Two Manager of the Month
Season	(England)	Adam Smith	EFL Awards Football League Team of the Season
Season	(England)	Chris Wilder	EFL Awards Football League Manager of the Season
Season	(England)	Adam Smith	PFA League Two Team of the Year
Season	(Republic of Ireland)	John-Joe O'Toole	PFA League Two Team of the Year
Season	(England)	Ricky Holmes	PFA League Two Team of the Year

== Transfers ==
=== Transfers in ===
Date from	Position	Nationality	Name	From	Fee	Ref.
1 July 2015	AM	WAL	Nicky Adams	Bury	Free transfer	
1 July 2015	LB	NIR	David Buchanan	Preston North End	Free transfer	
1 July 2015	CB	ENG	Josh Lelan	Derby County	Free transfer	
1 July 2015	GK	ENG	Adam Smith	Leicester City	Free transfer	
1 July 2015	RW	ENG	Alfie Potter	AFC Wimbledon	Free transfer	
2 July 2015	GK	ENG	Ryan Clarke	Oxford United	Free transfer	
28 July 2015	CB	ENG	Rod McDonald	AFC Telford United	Free transfer	
1 August 2015	CF	ENG	Sam Hoskins	Yeovil Town	Free transfer	
3 August 2015	CM	IRL	Paul Corry	Sheffield Wednesday	Free transfer	
1 February 2016	CM	ENG	Danny Rose	Oxford United	Free transfer	

=== Transfers out ===
Date from	Position	Nationality	Name	To	Fee	Ref.
1 July 2015	LW	WAL	Billy Bodin	Bristol Rovers	Released	(Note: Following Bodin's release he joined Bristol Rovers.)
1 July 2015	CM	ENG	Darren Carter	Forest Green Rovers	Released	(Note: Following Carter's release he joined Forest Green Rovers.)
1 July 2015	CB	ENG	Lee Collins	Mansfield Town	Released	(Note: Following Collins' release he joined Mansfield Town.)
1 July 2015	GK	ENG	Matt Duke	Alfreton Town	Released	
1 July 2015	CM	ENG	Lewis Hornby	Free agent	Released	
1 July 2015	LM	IRL	Ian Morris	St. Patrick's Athletic	Released	
1 July 2015	LB	ENG	Tom Newey	Free Agent	Released	
1 July 2015	CB	SCO	Ross Perry	Free Agent	Released	
1 July 2015	RB	ENG	Ben Tozer	Yeovil Town	Released	(Note: Following Tozer's release he joined Yeovil Town.)
6 August 2015	CF	ENG	Ivan Toney	Newcastle United	£500,000	
8 August 2015	GK	IRQ	Shwan Jalal	Macclesfield Town	Free transfer	

Total income: ▲£500,000

=== Loans in ===
Date from	Position	Nationality	Name	From	Date until	Ref.
7 August 2015	AM	ENG	Dominic Calvert-Lewin	Sheffield United	1 January 2016	
20 August 2015	DM	ENG	Ryan Watson	Leicester City	3 January 2016	
24 August 2015	RB	ENG	Adam Yates	Port Vale	26 September 2015	
11 September 2015	CB	ENG	Shaun Brisley	Peterborough United	9 October 2015	
11 September 2015	RB	ENG	Darnell Furlong	Queens Park Rangers	9 October 2015	
5 January 2016	ST	ENG	James Collins	Shrewsbury Town	30 June 2016	
15 January 2016	W	ENG	Lee Martin	Millwall	30 June 2016	
28 January 2016	CB	ENG	Luke Prosser	Southend United	30 June 2016	
22 February 2016	ST	ENG	John Marquis	Millwall	30 June 2016	

=== Loans out ===
Date from	Position	Nationality	Name	To	Date until	Ref.
14 August 2015	CM	ENG	Danny Clifton	Rugby Town	12 September 2015	
14 August 2015	LB	ENG	Sam Warburton	Rugby Town	12 September 2015	
14 January 2016	RW	ENG	Chris Hackett	Barnet	30 June 2016	
1 February 2016	LB	ENG	Evan Horwood	Grimsby Town	30 June 2016	
