= Dennon Lewis =

English footballer (born 1997)

Personal information
- Full name: Dennon Elliot Lewis
- Date of birth: 9 May 1997 (age 29)
- Place of birth: Brent, England
- Height: 1.75 m (5 ft 9 in)
- Position: Wingback

Team information
- Current team: Slough Town

Youth career
- 2008–2016: Watford

Senior career*
Years	Team	Apps	(Gls)
2016–2018	Watford	0	(0)
2016–2017	→ Woking (loan)	27	(4)
2017	→ Crawley Town (loan)	10	(0)
2018	Falkirk	16	(0)
2018–2019	Bromley	4	(0)
2019–2021	Wealdstone	86	(17)
2021–2023	Boreham Wood	64	(5)
2023–2025	Woking	44	(3)
2025–2026	Dorking Wanderers	54	(6)
2026–	Slough Town	0	(0)
- * Club domestic league appearances and goals as of 22:08, 22 October 2026 (UTC)

Dennon Elliot Lewis (born 9 May 1997) is an English footballer who plays as a wingback for National League South club Slough Town.

A former professional at Premier League side Watford, Lewis had loan spells at Woking and Crawley Town between 2016 and 2017. He then had a spell with Scottish club Falkirk in 2018, before joining Wealdstone in June 2019, following a brief stint with Bromley. He signed for Boreham Wood in November 2021, before returning to Woking ahead of the 2023–24 campaign. In June 2025, Lewis returned to the National League South to join Dorking Wanderers ahead of the 2025–26 campaign.

== Club career ==
Lewis joined the Academy at Watford in 2008, and progressed through the ranks to sign his first (three-year) professional contract in July 2015. He played all along the right-flank for the under-21s during the 2015–16 campaign, making a total of 29 appearances. On 28 July 2016, he joined National League club Woking on a season-long loan. He made his first team debut on 6 August, in a 3–1 defeat to Lincoln City at the Kingfield Stadium. He scored his first senior goal seven days later, in a 2–1 defeat at Southport. Between 3 September to 13 September he scored in three consecutive games, against Macclesfield Town, Guiseley and Torquay United. On 28 January, he received the first red card of his career when he was dismissed for two bookable offences in a 1–0 victory at Eastleigh. Lewis scored four goals from 33 appearances as Woking posted an 18th-place finish in the 2016–17 season. On 6 July 2017, he joined EFL League Two side Crawley Town on loan until the end of the year. He had previously played under "Red Devils" manager Harry Kewell when Kewell worked at the Watford Academy. He made his debut in the English Football League on 5 August, coming on as a 75th-minute substitute for Enzio Boldewijn in a 3–1 defeat to Port Vale at Broadfield Stadium. On 13 April 2018, it was announced that Lewis would leave Watford at the conclusion of his contract in June 2018.

Lewis signed a one-year contract with Scottish Championship club Falkirk, effective from 1 July 2018. On 14 July 2018, Lewis made his Falkirk debut during their 1–0 home defeat to Montrose in the Scottish League Cup and three days later scored his first goal in their 2–0 victory over Forfar Athletic. In November 2018, Lewis spoke out about the alleged racist abuse he received from Falkirk's own fans. Police Scotland later charged a 34 year old with breach of the peace, though stated there was insufficient evidence to prove any racist intent.

On 15 June 2019, following a brief spell with National League side, Bromley, Lewis joined National League South side, Wealdstone. He went onto make his debut for the club during a 4–1 home victory over Dartford on the opening day of the 2019–20 campaign, in which he scored in the 76th minute to give the hosts a 2–1 lead. Lewis went onto net ten more times in the league for the Stones, in a campaign which was prematurely ended due to emergence of the COVID-19 pandemic. On 10 September 2020, following the club's promotion to the National League, Lewis signed a new two-year deal. On 5 April 2021, Lewis scored a brace against rivals Barnet, and netted a total of 5 times in 40 league appearances in the 2020-21 season. Lewis started the 2021-22 season playing in a left wingback role. On 4 September 2021 he scored his first goal of the season against Dagenham & Redbridge, and appeared in all of Wealdstone's first 13 league games before leaving the club

On 9 November 2021, Lewis signed for fellow National League side Boreham Wood.

On 25 May 2023, following the expiry of his contract at Boreham Wood, Lewis agreed to return to Woking on a one-year deal, where he had a previous loan spell during the 2016–17 campaign. On 6 May 2025, it was announced that Lewis would leave the club upon the expiry of his contract in June. He departed having scored 6 goals in 55 appearances.

On 19 June 2025, it was announced that Lewis would join National League South side, Dorking Wanderers following his release from Woking.

On 23 October 2026, Lewis joined fellow National League South club Slough Town for an undisclosed fee.

== Career statistics ==
As of match played 17 October 2026

Appearances and goals by club, season and competition
Club	Season	League			National Cup		League Cup		Other		Total	
Club	Season	Division	Apps	Goals	Apps	Goals	Apps	Goals	Apps	Goals	Apps	Goals
Watford	2016–17	Premier League	0	0	0	0	0	0	—		0	0
Watford	2017–18	Premier League	0	0	0	0	0	0	—		0	0
Watford	Total		0	0	0	0	0	0	0	0	0	0
Woking (loan)	2016–17	National League	27	4	4	0	—		2 (Note: Appearances in the FA Trophy)	0	33	4
Crawley Town (loan)	2017–18	League Two	10	0	0	0	1	0	3 (Note: Appearances in the EFL Trophy)	0	14	0
Falkirk	2018–19	Scottish Championship	16	0	1	0	4	1	2 (Note: Appearances in the Scottish Challenge Cup)	1	23	2
Bromley	2018–19	National League	4	0	0	0	—		0	0	4	0
Wealdstone	2019–20	National League South	33	11	5	2	—		1	0	39	13
Wealdstone	2020–21	National League	40	5	1	0	—		3	1	44	6
Wealdstone	2021–22	National League	13	1	1	0	—		—		14	1
Wealdstone	Total		86	17	7	2	—		4	1	95	20
Boreham Wood	2021–22	National League	23	2	—		—		3	0	26	2
Boreham Wood	2022–23	National League	41	3	3	0	—		2 (Note: One appearance in the FA Trophy, one in the National League play-offs)	0	46	3
Boreham Wood	Total		64	5	3	0	—		5	0	72	5
Woking	2023–24	National League	26	3	3	1	—		1	0	30	4
Woking	2024–25	National League	18	0	1	0	—		6 (Note: Four appearances in FA Trophy; Two Appearances in National League Cup)	2	25	2
Woking	Total		44	3	4	1	—		7	2	55	6
Dorking Wanderers	2025–26	National League South	44	6	4	2	—		4 (Note: Two appearances and one goal in the FA Trophy, two appearances in the National League South play-offs)	1	52	9
Dorking Wanderers	2026–27	National League South	10	0	4	1	—		0	0	14	1
Dorking Wanderers	Total		54	6	8	3	—		4	1	66	10
Slough Town	2026–27	National League South	0	0	—		—		0	0	0	0
Career total			297	32	27	6	5	1	27	5	356	44

== Love Island ==
In 2019, Lewis participated in the fifth series of the ITV2 reality series Love Island.
