= Josh Lelan =

Kenyan footballer (born 1994)

Personal information
- Full name: Joshua Kipkemboi Whittaker Lelan
- Date of birth: 21 December 1994 (age 31)
- Place of birth: Church Broughton, England
- Height: 1.85 m (6 ft 1 in)
- Position: Defender

Team information
- Current team: Farnham Town (dual-registration)

Youth career
- 2011–2013: Derby County

Senior career*
Years	Team	Apps	(Gls)
2013–2015	Derby County	0	(0)
2013	→ Gateshead (loan)	4	(0)
2014	→ Swindon Town (loan)	2	(0)
2014	→ Swindon Town (loan)	3	(0)
2015–2016	Northampton Town	11	(0)
2017–2018	Crawley Town	43	(0)
2018–2019	Aldershot Town	23	(0)
2021–2022	Walton Casuals	0	(0)
2022–2023	Hemel Hempstead Town	17	(1)
2023–	Hayes & Yeading United	0	(0)
2023–	Farnham Town (dual registration)	0	(0)

International career^{‡}
2016	Kenya	1	(0)
- * Club domestic league appearances and goals as of 20:13, 20 February 2019 (UTC) ‡ National team caps and goals as of 30 August 2016 (UTC)

Joshua Kipkemboi Whittaker Lelan (born 21 December 1994) is a professional footballer who plays as a central defender or right back for Farnham Town on a dual registration from Hayes & Yeading United. Born in England, he represents the Kenya national team.

== Club career ==
=== Derby County ===
Born in Church Broughton, England, Lelann started his career within Derby County's youth system since joining the club when he was fourteen years old and was a season ticket holder. On 29 April 2012, Lelan appeared in the first team for the first time, as an unused substitute in a 1–1 draw against Peterborough United. Ahead of the 2012–13 season, he was given a number twenty–eight shirt and appeared in the first team matches as an unused substitute. On 6 April 2013, Lelan signed his first professional contract with Derby County after the completion of his two-year scholarship programmes.

Lelan's first taste of senior football came when he joined Football Conference side Gateshead on a one-month loan on 20 September 2013. He made his debut in the 1–0 win over Tamworth three days later. Lelan returned to his parent club after making four appearances for Gateshead.

On 23 July 2014, Lelan joined Swindon Town on a one-month young loan. He made his debut on the opening day of Swindon's 2014–15 campaign at home to Scunthorpe United. On 29 August 2014, Lelan extended his loan at Swindon by a further month, which would see him stay at the club until 27 September 2014. Lelan made five appearances for the club, as he was recalled by his parent club.

At the end of the 2014–15 season, Lelan was released by the club.

=== Northampton Town ===
After being released by Derby County, Lelan joined Football League Two side Northampton Town on a 12-month contract. Upon joining the club, he was given a number twelve shirt.

Lelan made his debut for Northampton Town, starting the whole game in the right–back position, in a 1–0 win against Bristol Rovers in the opening game of the season. He helped the club keep a clean sheet in the next two matches against Blackpool and Exeter City. However, in a match against Plymouth Argyle on 22 August 2015, Lelan received a red card for a second bookable offence, having been booked twice within the last two minutes of the game, as Northampton Town lost 2–0. In a match against Dagenham & Redbridge, he was at fault for the conceding the first goal of the game, as the club lost 2–1. As a result, Lelan lost his first team place in the right–back position, with Darnell Furlong and Brendan Moloney preferred as Northampton Town's first choice right–back. It wasn't until on 24 November 2015 when he made his return to the first team against Crawley Town, coming on as a 62nd-minute substitute, in a 2–1 loss. In a follow–up match, Lelan made his first start for the club for the first time in two months against Yeovil Town and helped Northampton Town keep a clean sheet, in a 2–0 win. However, he, once again, lost his first team place to Moloney in the right–back position for the next five months. Following the club's promotion to League One, Lelan started in the remaining four matches of the season, playing in the right–back position. At the end of the 2015–16 season, he went on to make thirteen appearances in all competitions. Following this, Lelan was released by Northampton Town, as the club's manager Rob Page expressed regret after his decision to release the player, saying "the lad has gone in and given a good account of himself. From a supporters' view it might be a little bit of a surprise, but we have made the decision [to release Lelan] as a group and what we think is best for this football club."

In July 2016, Lelan, in search of a new club, played as a trialist for League One team Gillingham in a 2–1 win over Concord Rangers and League Two team Plymouth Argyle in a 9–0 win over St Blazey. He was reported to be attending trials at Swedish 3rd tier side Västerås SK on 11 August 2016, but failed to win a contract. Lelan then returned to his former club, Derby County U23, featuring seven times between October 2016 and January 2017. On 2 December 2016, he was on trial with League Two side Leyton Orient playing against Southend United in a behind-closed-door friendly.

=== Crawley Town ===
On 26 January 2017, Lelan joined League Two side Crawley Town on a one-and-a-half-year deal after a short-term trial spell back at Derby County.

On 4 February 2017, he made his debut for the club in their 2–1 home defeat against Stevenage. Featuring for the full 90 minutes, Lelan was awarded Crawley Town's man of the match after an impressive debut despite the defeat. Since joining the club, he started in the next four matches, playing in either the centre–back and right–back positions. However, in a match against Wycombe Wanderers on 25 February 2017, Lelan suffered an injury and was substituted in the 21st minute, as Crawley Town won 2–1. After missing one match, he returned to the starting line–up against Doncaster Rovers and helped the club keep a clean sheet, in a 0–0 draw on 4 March 2017. Lelan then followed up by starting in the right–back position for the next three matches for Crawley Town. However, he found his playing time, mostly coming from the substitute bench for the rest of the 2016–17 season. At the end of the 2016–17 season, Lelan went on to make twenty appearances in all competitions.

At the start of the 2017–18 season, Lelan continued to establish himself in the first team, rotating in playing either the centre–back, left–back position and right–back position. He then helped Crawley Town keep two consecutive clean sheets in two matches between 26 August 2017 and 2 September 2017 against Swindon Town and Yeovil Town. Lelan helped the club keep four clean sheets out of the five matches between 7 October 2017 and 28 October 2017. Since the start of the 2017–18 season, he started in every match until he was dropped to the substitute bench for the next two matches between 21 November 2017 and 25 November 2017. But Lelan made his return to the starting line–up against Mansfield Town on 9 December 2017 and helped Crawley Town keep a clean sheet, in a 2–0 win. He then regained his first team place for the next ten matches for the club. However, Lelan lost his first team place and was placed on the substitute bench for the rest of the 2017–18 season. At the end of the 2017–18 season, he went on to make thirty–three appearances in all competitions. On 14 May 2018, it was announced that Lelan would leave Crawley at the end of his current deal in June.

=== Aldershot Town ===
On 2 July 2018, following his release from Crawley, Lelan agreed to join National League side Aldershot Town.

He made his debut for the club, starting the whole game in the right–back position, in a 1–0 loss against Solihull Moors on 11 August 2018. Since joining Aldershot Town, Lelan quickly became a first team regular, playing in either the centre–back position and right–back position. The club were eventually relegated after a 1–1 draw against Hartlepool United on 13 April 2019. At the end of the 2018–19 season, he went on to make twenty–six appearances in all competitions. Following this, Lelan was released at the end of his first season at the club.

=== Hayes and Yeading ===
In early 2023, Lelan signed for Hayes & Yeading United

=== Farnham Town ===
On 22 September 2023, Lelan signed for Farnham Town on a dual registration from Hayes & Yeading United.

== International career ==
On 5 August 2016 Lelan received his first call up for the Kenya for the first time and was eligible to play for the national team through his father. He made his international debut on 30 August 2016 in a match against Uganda, coming on as a substitute, in a 0–0 draw. After making his making his Kenya debut, Lelan reflected on his debut, saying: "It was a completely different style of football which I learnt a lot from and I'd like to play more games international games. Playing with Victor was a massively proud moment for me and my family.".

== Career statistics ==
As of match played 15 December 2018.

Appearances and goals by club, season and competition
Club	Season	League			FA Cup		League Cup		Other		Total	
Club	Season	Division	Apps	Goals	Apps	Goals	Apps	Goals	Apps	Goals	Apps	Goals
Gateshead (loan)	2013–14	Conference Premier	4	0	0	0	—		0	0	4	0
Swindon Town (loan)	2014–15	League One	5	0	0	0	0	0	1 (Note: Appearance(s) in Football League Trophy)	0	6	0
Northampton Town	2015–16	League Two	11	0	0	0	1	0	1	0	13	0
Crawley Town	2016–17	League Two	13	0	0	0	0	0	0	0	13	0
Crawley Town	2017–18	League Two	30	0	1	0	0	0	1 (Note: Appearance(s) in EFL Trophy)	0	32	0
Crawley Town	Total		43	0	1	0	0	0	1	0	45	0
Aldershot Town	2018–19	National League	17	0	1	0	—		1 (Note: Appearance(s) in FA Trophy)	0	19	0
Career total			80	0	2	0	1	0	4	0	87	0

== Honours ==
Northampton Town

- Football League Two: 2015–16
