= Josh Payne =

English footballer

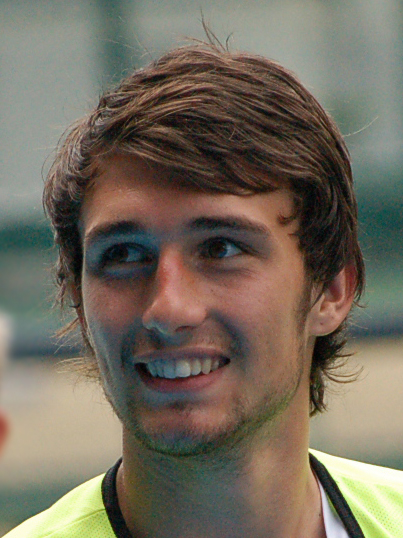
- Payne in May 2008

Personal information
- Full name: Joshua James Payne
- Date of birth: 25 November 1990 (age 35)
- Place of birth: Basingstoke, England
- Height: 6 ft 0 in (1.83 m)
- Position: Midfielder

Team information
- Current team: Beaconsfield Town

Youth career
- Portsmouth
- Southampton
- 2007–2008: West Ham United

Senior career*
Years	Team	Apps	(Gls)
2008–2010	West Ham United	2	(0)
2008	→ Cheltenham Town (loan)	11	(1)
2009	→ Colchester United (loan)	3	(0)
2010	→ Wycombe Wanderers (loan)	3	(1)
2010	Doncaster Rovers	0	(0)
2010–2012	Oxford United	34	(1)
2012	→ Aldershot Town (loan)	6	(1)
2012	Aldershot Town	26	(2)
2013–2015	Woking	82	(11)
2015–2016	Eastleigh	38	(4)
2016–2020	Crawley Town	96	(8)
2019–2020	→ Ebbsfleet United (loan)	22	(1)
2020–2021	Ebbsfleet United	9	(0)
2021–2022	Barnet	12	(0)
2022	Hayes & Yeading United	6	(0)
2023	Maidenhead Cosmos	8	(3)
2023–	Beaconsfield Town	27	(4)

International career
2013–2014	England C	5	(0)
- * Club domestic league appearances and goals as of 21:10, 14 August 2024 (UTC)

Joshua James Payne (born 25 November 1990) is an English footballer who plays as a midfielder for Beaconsfield Town. He has previously played for West Ham United, Cheltenham Town, Colchester United, Wycombe Wanderers, Doncaster Rovers, Oxford United, Aldershot Town, Woking, Eastleigh, Crawley Town, Ebbsfleet United, Barnet and Hayes & Yeading United.

== Early life ==
Payne was born and grew up in Basingstoke, where he attended Brighton Hill Community College.

== Club career ==
Payne began his career with Portsmouth and Southampton before moving to West Ham United. He was named as 2008–09 captain of the West Ham Under-18 team, but joined Cheltenham Town on an initial one-month loan on 24 September 2008. He made his debut for Cheltenham against Stockport County on 27 September 2008, scoring a goal in the 66th minute. Payne's loan with Cheltenham Town lasted three months before he returned to West Ham on 22 December 2008. Payne made his West Ham and Premier League debut on 21 March 2009 in a 1–1 away draw against Blackburn Rovers coming on as a 90th-minute substitute for Diego Tristán.

On 22 October 2009 Payne signed for Colchester United on a one-month loan. Payne made his debut for Colchester on 24 October 2009 in a 2–1 home victory against Walsall and was fouled for a penalty, which resulted in Colchester's second and winning goal. Payne returned to West Ham on 20 November, having played only three games for Colchester, as manager Aidy Boothroyd decided not to extend his loan.

On 22 January 2010 Wycombe Wanderers confirmed they had signed Payne on an initial one-month loan. Payne made his debut for Wycombe on 23 January, scoring in a 1–1 away draw against Southend United.

He returned to West Ham on 25 February 2010. In March 2010 it was announced that Payne's contract with West Ham would not be renewed beyond the end of the 2009–10 season.

On 28 July 2010 Payne signed for Doncaster Rovers on an initial six-months contract after a successful trial period at the club. He made his Rovers debut in the League Cup tie against Accrington Stanley on 10 August 2010, scoring his first and Doncaster's only goal in a 2–1 defeat.

On 31 August 2010 Payne joined Oxford United on a one-month loan deal, which was then extended for another three months. Payne subsequently signed a pre-contract agreement with Oxford, making the move permanent. He scored his first goal for Oxford from a free kick in a 3–1 home victory against Northampton on 23 October 2010.

In January 2012 it was confirmed that Payne would be joining Aldershot Town on loan, initially for a month but later extended to the end of the season. On 5 March, the move was made permanent on a free transfer.

On 24 June 2013, shortly after his release from prison, Payne signed for Woking. Payne played 95 league and cup games for Woking. He left the Conference Premier side at the end of the 2014–15 season to join Eastleigh. After a successful debut season with Eastleigh, Payne decided to reject a new one-year deal to venture into The Football League.

On 26 May 2016, Payne joined Crawley Town on a two-year deal. On 6 August 2016, Payne made his Crawley debut in a 1–0 victory against Wycombe Wanderers, playing the full 90 minutes. On 3 October 2019, Payne joined National League club Ebbsfleet United on loan until January 2020. In January 2020, his loan was extended until the end of the season. His contract with Crawley Town was not extended at the end of the 2019–20 season.

Following his release from Crawley, Payne signed a two-year contract with former club Ebbsfleet United in July 2020. He signed for Barnet in July 2021. Payne left the Bees by mutual consent in January 2022. On 1 March 2022, Payne joined Southern League Premier Division South leaders Hayes & Yeading United.

After starring for Maidenhead Cosmos in the latter part of the 2022/2023 season, Payne signed with Beaconsfield Town for the 2023/2024 season.

== Personal life ==
In December 2012 Payne was sent to prison for twelve months following a conviction for actual bodily harm and common assault following an incident in Guildford town centre in May 2012; upon conviction Aldershot terminated Payne's contract.

== Career statistics ==
As of match played 13 August 2023

Appearances and goals by club, season and competition
Club	Season	League			FA Cup		League Cup		Other		Total	
Club	Season	Division	Apps	Goals	Apps	Goals	Apps	Goals	Apps	Goals	Apps	Goals
West Ham United	2008–09	Premier League	2	0	0	0	0	0	—		2	0
West Ham United	2009–10	Premier League	0	0	0	0	1	0	—		1	0
West Ham United	Total		2	0	0	0	1	0	—		3	0
Cheltenham Town (loan)	2008–09	League One	11	1	2	0	0	0	0	0	13	1
Colchester United (loan)	2009–10	League One	3	0	0	0	0	0	0	0	3	0
Wycombe Wanderers (loan)	2009–10	League One	3	1	0	0	0	0	0	0	3	1
Doncaster Rovers	2010–11	Championship	0	0	0	0	1	1	—		1	1
Oxford United	2010–11	League Two	28	1	1	0	0	0	1 (Note: Appearances in the Football League Trophy)	0	30	1
Oxford United	2011–12	League Two	6	0	1	0	0	0	2	0	9	0
Oxford United	Total		34	1	2	0	0	0	3	0	39	1
Aldershot Town (loan)	2011–12	League Two	6	1	0	0	0	0	0	0	6	1
Aldershot Town	2011–12	League Two	11	1	0	0	0	0	0	0	11	1
Aldershot Town	2012–13	League Two	15	1	2	0	1	0	0	0	18	1
Aldershot Town	Total		32	3	2	0	1	0	0	0	36	3
Woking	2013–14	Conference Premier	40	3	1	0	—		2 (Note: Appearances in the FA Trophy)	0	43	3
Woking	2014–15	Conference Premier	42	8	2	0	—		5	2	49	10
Woking	Total		82	11	3	0	—		7	2	92	13
Eastleigh	2015–16	National League	38	4	5	1	—		2	0	45	5
Crawley Town	2016–17	League Two	32	1	0	0	1	0	0	0	33	1
Crawley Town	2017–18	League Two	35	5	0	0	1	0	3	0	39	5
Crawley Town	2018–19	League Two	27	1	2	0	0	0	0	0	29	1
Crawley Town	2019–20	League Two	2	1	0	0	1	0	2	0	5	1
Crawley Town	Total		96	8	2	0	3	0	5	0	106	8
Ebbsfleet United (loan)	2019–20	National League	22	1	2	1	—		2	0	26	2
Ebbsfleet United	2020–21	National League South	9	0	1	0	—		1	0	11	0
Barnet	2021–22	National League	12	0	0	0	—		1	0	13	0
Maidenhead Cosmos	2022–23	Thames Valley League	8	3	0	0	—		0	0	8	3
Beaconsfield Town	2023–24	Southern League Premier South	5	0	0	0	—		0	0	5	0
Career total			357	33	19	2	6	1	21	2	403	38
