= Addison Garnett =

English footballer

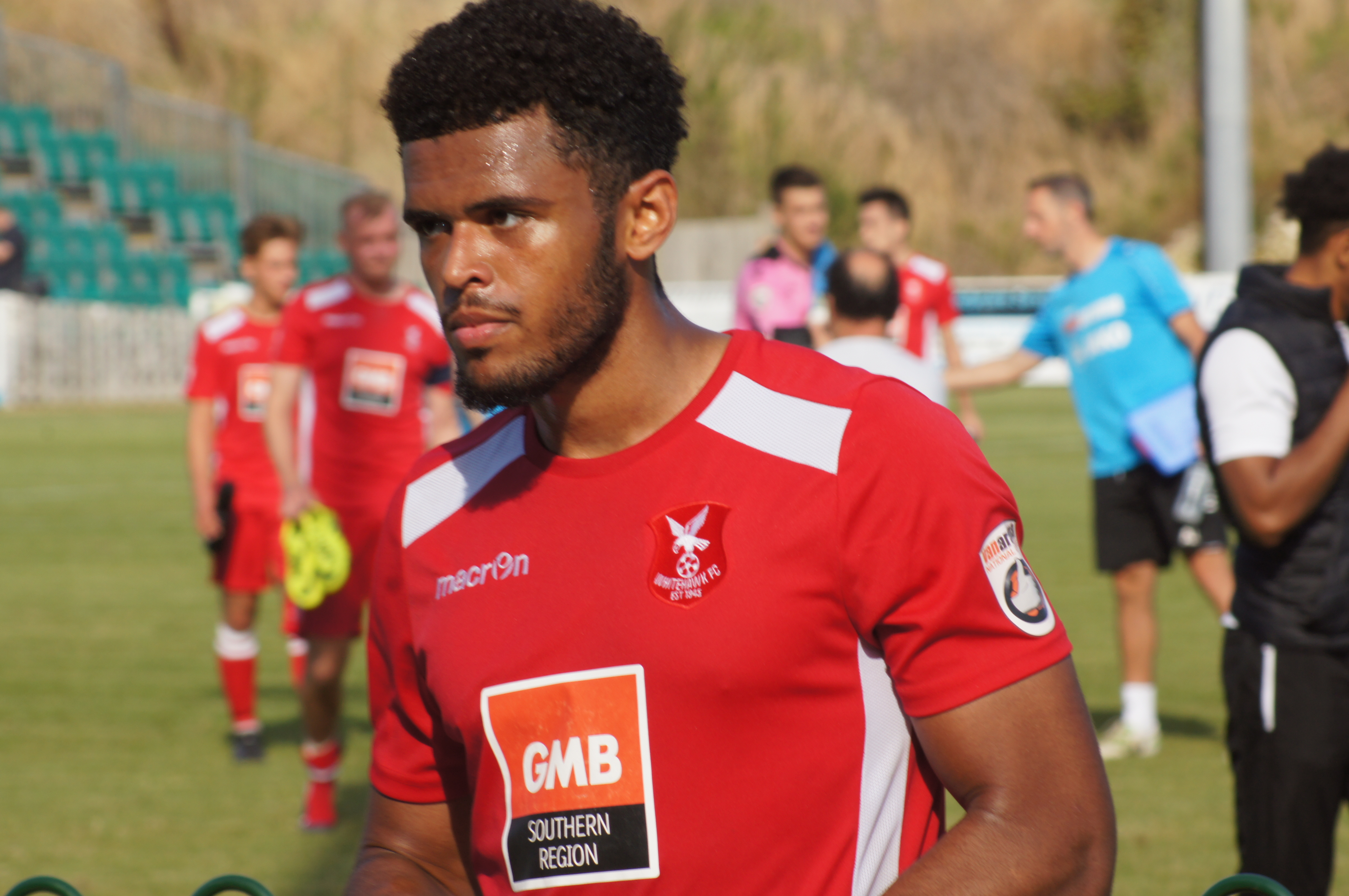
- Garnett playing for Whitehawk August 2017

Personal information
- Full name: Addison Righteous Adam Garnett
- Date of birth: 13 September 1996 (age 30)
- Place of birth: London, England
- Height: 6 ft 4 in (1.93 m)
- Position: Defender

Team information
- Current team: Hanwell Town

Youth career
- Bedfont Sports
- –2015: Queens Park Rangers

College career
Years	Team	Apps	(Gls)
2015	Missouri State Bears		

Senior career*
Years	Team	Apps	(Gls)
2016	Hendon	9	(2)
2016–2018	Crawley Town	12	(0)
2017	→ Whitehawk (loan)	18	(1)
2018	Bedfont Sports	17	(0)
2021–2022	St Panteleimon	27	(4)
2022	Wingate & Finchley	12	(0)
2024	Ashford Town (Middlesex)	9	(0)
2024	Harrow Borough	18	(0)
2024-2025	Whitehawk	8	(2)
2025-	Hanwell Town	7	(0)
- * Club domestic league appearances and goals as of 15:53, 14 August 2025 (UTC)

Addison Righteous Adam Garnett (born 13 September 1996) is an English semi-professional footballer who plays as a defender for Hanwell Town.

Garnett originally began his career at local side, Bedfont Sports before joining Football League side Queens Park Rangers in his mid-teens. Following his release from Loftus Road, Garnett began a sports scholarship for Missouri State Bears in the US, before returning to England for a trial with Carlisle United in December 2015. However, manager, Keith Curle opted against signing the former Queens Park Rangers man and he instead joined Isthmian League side Hendon during the closing stages of the 2015–16 season. Garnett then returned to the Football League, to join Crawley Town. He went onto spend two years at the Reds, including a short-term loan spell with Whitehawk, before leaving in January 2018. A month later, he re-joined boyhood club, Bedfont Sports, before spells with St Panteleimon and Wingate & Finchley in 2021 and 2022.

== Club career ==
After spells with Bedfont Sports and Queens Park Rangers, Garnett moved to the US to begin a sport scholarship with college side Missouri State Bears in April 2015. In December 2015, Garnett was invited by Carlisle United manager Keith Curle to take part in a one-month trial. However, at the end of the month, Curle opted against signing him. In February 2016, Garnett returned to England to join Isthmian League Premier Division side Hendon. Garnett went onto make ten appearances for Hendon (including London Senior Cup) before leaving for the Football League.

On 13 July 2016, after a successful trial, Garnett joined League Two side Crawley Town on a two-year deal. On 9 November 2016, after struggling with a hamstring injury, Garnett made his long-awaited debut in a 4–0 defeat to Southampton U23's in the EFL Trophy, replacing Chris Arthur at half-time. Three days later, Garnett made his league debut for Crawley, in a 3–1 home defeat against Cambridge United, replacing Mark Connolly in the 44th minute. On 25 August 2017, Garnett joined National League South side Whitehawk on a one-month loan deal. A day later, Garnett made his debut for Whitehawk in their 1–1 draw with Braintree Town, featuring for the entire 90 minutes. On 18 January 2018, it was announced that Garnett's contract with Crawley had been terminated and that he would leave the club.

On 10 February 2018, following his release from Crawley, Garnett returned to boyhood club, Bedfont Sports of the Combined Counties League Premier Division. He went onto make his debut on the same day during their 2–1 away victory over Horley Town, playing the full 90 minutes.

Following a few years out of the game, Garnett returned, having spells at St Panteleimon and Wingate & Finchley between 2021 and 2022, before Ashford Town (Middlesex), Harrow Borough and a return to Whitehawk.

Garnett joined Hanwell Town for the start of the 2025–26 season.

== Career statistics ==
As of match played 20 August 2022.

Appearances and goals by club, season and competition
Club	Season	League			FA Cup		EFL Cup		Other		Total	
Club	Season	Division	Apps	Goals	Apps	Goals	Apps	Goals	Apps	Goals	Apps	Goals
Hendon	2015–16	Isthmian League Premier Division	9	0	—		—		0	0	9	0
Crawley Town	2016–17	League Two	4	0	1	0	0	0	1 (Note: Appearance in the EFL Trophy)	0	6	0
Crawley Town	2017–18	League Two	0	0	—		0	0	0	0	0	0
Crawley Town	Total		4	0	1	0	0	0	1	0	6	0
Whitehawk (loan)	2017–18	National League South	6	0	1	0	—		0	0	7	0
Bedfont Sports	2017–18	Combined Counties League Premier Division	4	0	—		—		0	0	4	0
Bedfont Sports	2018–19	Isthmian League South Central Division	3	0	3	0	—		0	0	6	0
Bedfont Sports	Total		7	0	3	0	—		0	0	10	0
St Panteleimon	2021–22	Combined Counties League Premier Division North	7	0	1	0	—		1 (Note: Appearance in the Combined Counties League Premier Challenge Cup)	0	9	0
Wingate & Finchley	2022–23	Isthmian League Premier Division	2	0	0	0	—		0	0	2	0
Career total			33	0	6	0	0	0	2	0	41	0
