= James Collins (footballer, born 1990) =

Irish association football player

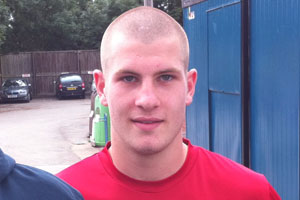
- Collins in 2010

Personal information
- Full name: James Steven Collins
- Date of birth: 1 December 1990 (age 35)
- Place of birth: Coventry, England
- Height: 6 ft 2 in (1.88 m)
- Position: Striker

Team information
- Current team: Doncaster Rovers (on loan from Lincoln City)
- Number: 17

Youth career
- 2004–2009: Aston Villa

Senior career*
Years	Team	Apps	(Gls)
2009–2011	Aston Villa	0	(0)
2009–2010	→ Darlington (loan)	7	(2)
2010	→ Burton Albion (loan)	10	(4)
2011–2012	Shrewsbury Town	66	(22)
2012–2013	Swindon Town	45	(15)
2013–2014	Hibernian	36	(6)
2014–2016	Shrewsbury Town	68	(20)
2016	→ Northampton Town (loan)	21	(8)
2016–2017	Crawley Town	45	(20)
2017–2021	Luton Town	174	(68)
2021–2022	Cardiff City	26	(3)
2022–2025	Derby County	97	(25)
2025–	Lincoln City	38	(14)
2026–	→ Doncaster Rovers (loan)	1	(0)

International career^{‡}
2008–2009	Republic of Ireland U19	6	(3)
2009–2012	Republic of Ireland U21	12	(3)
2019–2021	Republic of Ireland	13	(2)
- * Club domestic league appearances and goals as of 17:11, 21 November 2026 (UTC) ‡ National team caps and goals as of 8 September 2021 (UTC)

James Steven Collins (born 1 December 1990) is a professional footballer who plays as a striker for EFL League One club Doncaster Rovers on loan from EFL Championship club Lincoln City. Starting his career at Aston Villa, he did not break through to the first team and has since represented a number of teams in the English Football League and the Scottish Premiership.

Collins has won promotion from the fourth tier of English football four times so far in his career: twice as a runner-up with Shrewsbury Town, once as champions with Northampton Town, and most recently with Luton Town. He also twice gained promotion from the third tier of English football; once as champions with Luton Town, and most recently with Derby County.

Born and raised in England, he represented the Republic of Ireland at under-19 and under-21 levels before making his senior international debut – and scoring – in 2019 in a friendly match against Bulgaria.

== Career ==
=== Aston Villa ===
Born in Coventry, West Midlands, Collins started his career with Aston Villa. He attended the Cardinal Wiseman Catholic School in Coventry.

In his final years at the club's academy and reserve teams, Collins had been a prolific goalscorer for the academy notching up 23 goals. His impact led manager Martin O'Neill to give Collins the opportunity to prove himself on loan the following season.

He was loaned out in October 2009 on a three-month deal to Darlington, where he made his professional debut in a 3–0 loss to Barnet. He scored his first goal for Darlington in a 2–1 defeat at Hereford United on 31 October 2009. Three weeks later, on 21 November 2009, Collins scored again, a 35-yard lob, in a 5–2 loss against Chesterfield. Collins' spell at Darlington began successfully, however he found it difficult to remain in the first team and later returned to Aston Villa on 22 January 2010 when his loan spell terminated.

On 15 October 2010, Collins joined League Two club Burton Albion on an emergency loan, and immediately made an impact by scoring two goals in his first three matches for the club. His good performance earned Collins a nomination for the League Two Player of the Month award.

His good performance led Collins to stay at the club making a permanent move. On 15 November 2010, his loan spell was extended for a second month. After adding two more goals to his tally, his loan spell was extended for the third time. However, manager Paul Peschisolido believed Collins would not stay at the club after January.

Prior to the 2010–11 season, Collins joined up with Scottish club Aberdeen for a trial, appearing in a friendly match away to Tamworth. At this time, he became known as "Jim Collins", presumably to avoid confusion between himself and his Aston Villa teammate of the same name. Following the trial, it appeared that Collins had returned to The Villans; however it was reported that Aberdeen boss Mark McGhee had not given up on signing the player. Nonetheless, Collins remained at Villa following the departure of O'Neill. Caretaker boss Kevin MacDonald named the striker in his 20-man squad to travel to Rapid Vienna in the UEFA Europa League on 18 August 2010. On Aston Villa's official website, he has been called James Collins Jnr.

=== Shrewsbury Town ===
On 7 January 2011, Collins signed permanently for League Two club Shrewsbury Town on an 18-month contract. He made his debut the following day, setting up a goal for Shane Cansdell-Sherriff, in a 3–1 loss against Morecambe. Collins scored his first goals for the club on 18 January, notching twice in a 3–1 win over Accrington Stanley and scored another brace on 29 March, in a 3–1 victory over Rotherham United, managing eight goals in total during his first half season at Shrewsbury.

The 2011–12 season started well for Collins when he scored his first league goal in the opening match of the season, Shrewsbury Town drawing 1–1 against Plymouth Argyle, and scoring again in a 3–2 win over Derby County in the first round of the League Cup days later.

On 20 September 2011, he scored against Premier League team Arsenal in the third round of the League Cup, giving Shrewsbury an early lead in a match they would ultimately lose 3–1 at The Emirates, and hit another brace on return to League duty four days later in a 2–0 win over Torquay United to send the club into second place in the table.

Following an injury to midfielder Nicky Wroe, Collins temporarily assumed penalty taking duties for Shrewsbury Town, scoring from the spot in a 2–1 home win against Southend United. During the season, manager Graham Turner compared Collins to Wolves legend Steve Bull, due to his strength and determination, also commenting that he believed he could continue to improve his goal scoring record.

In his first full season at Shrewsbury, Collins made 47 appearances, scoring 16 goals in all competitions, and was the club's top scorer as they won promotion to League One. Collins was offered a new deal and Turner expected him to re-sign, however he attracted interests from other clubs such as Watford, Coventry City and Sheffield United, ultimately opting to join fellow promoted club Swindon Town.

=== Swindon Town ===
On 18 June 2012, Collins signed for Swindon Town. Upon the move, Shrewsbury manager Graham Turner expected the fee to be settled by a tribunal, which was eventually settled at £140,000 plus add-ons, ultimately causing Swindon to enter a transfer embargo due to overspending.

Collins first goals for the club came against Premier League team Stoke City in the second round of the League Cup, scoring a hat-trick to help knock out Stoke 4–3 after extra time. Collins first league goal came eleven matches into Swindon's campaign and proved to be the winner despite being scored in the first minute against Bury on 6 October 2012. Collins then added his second goal in the league the following match against the club he supported as a boy, Coventry, this time helping Swindon rescue a point on 13 October. The New Year proved to be good fortune for Collins as he scored four goals against Portsmouth on 1 January 2013 in a 5–0 thrashing. After the match, Collins described scoring four goals, after coming on from the bench, as "surreal experience".

Despite manager Paolo Di Canio resigning, the introduction of new manager Kevin MacDonald allowed Collins to add to his goal tally with strikes against promotion-chasing Tranmere Rovers and Yeovil Town. By the end of the season, Collins had scored 18 goals in all competitions, his last a consolation effort in a 3–1 loss against Scunthorpe United, who fell to final day relegation despite their win. Collins finished his only season at Swindon Town as the club's top-scorer in the league and in all competitions.

It was reported on 21 July 2013 that Swindon had accepted a £200,000 bid from Hibernian for Collins.

=== Hibernian ===
Hibernian confirmed that Collins had signed a three-year contract with the club on 29 July 2013. Collins made his Hibs debut, making his first start in the opening match of the 2013–14 Scottish Premiership season, in a 1–0 loss against Motherwell. After five matches without a goal, Collins scored the winning goal against St Johnstone on 14 September and scored another the following week, in a 2–0 win over against St Mirren.

Following Pat Fenlon's departure, Collins vowed to score more goals under new manager Terry Butcher after scoring fewer goals than expected by that point. In Butcher's first match as Hibernian Manager, Collins scored a last minute goal, in a 1–1 draw against Partick Thistle on 7 November 2013. Collins scored the opening goal in a 2–1 win against fierce rivals Hearts on 2 January 2014. A week after scoring in the derby, Collins scored twice, as Hibernian lost 3–2 to St Mirren on 18 January 2014. Reflecting on his time at Hibernian, Collins told his former Hibernian teammate Owain Tudor Jones on The Longman's Football World podcast that he regretted joining the club, though he "did have some happy memories" there.

=== Return to Shrewsbury ===
Following Hibernian's relegation, Collins re-signed for former club Shrewsbury Town on 4 June 2014 on a two-year contract with an option for a third year. He scored twice on his return debut, securing a point in a 2–2 draw away to AFC Wimbledon on 9 August. The following month, he scored the only goal as Shrewsbury beat Norwich City in the League Cup, notably sending the club through to the fourth round of the competition for the first time since the 1986–87 season.

Surpassing his previous season's goal tally on 8 November, when he scored his seventh goal of the season in all competitions against Walsall in the FA Cup, he continued to weigh in with important goals as Shrewsbury climbed into the top reaches of the League Two table, hitting double figures for the season with a brace against Exeter City, following this up with the opener in a 2–0 away win at Oxford United on Boxing Day, and the second goal in a 3–0 home win against bottom of the table Hartlepool United in January 2015.

Collins ended the 2014–15 season as Shrewsbury's top scorer, with 17 goals in all competitions as he won promotion to League One with the club for the second time in his career, having finished as runners up to Burton Albion.

Collins began the 2015–16 with a goal in each of the opening two matches, a 2–1 home defeat to Millwall, and a 2–1 away victory over Blackburn Rovers in the League Cup. After a spell where he found himself in and out of the team, he was restored to the starting line-up, and named captain for the first time in an FA Cup first-round tie at non-League team Gainsborough Trinity. After scoring the only goal of the match, he won the plaudits of manager Micky Mellon, who commented that wearing the captain's armband had turned Collins into "Superman".

In January 2016, following a 7–1 defeat to Chesterfield in which he was named captain, Collins was loaned out to Northampton Town until the end of the season. He scored on his debut for the club, the opening goal in a 2–1 victory at Plymouth Argyle. He played regularly during the second half of the season as Northampton were promoted from League Two as champions.

After returning from his loan spell, Collins contract at Shrewsbury was cancelled by mutual consent in July 2016.

=== Crawley Town ===
After his release from Shrewsbury, Collins signed a three-year contract with League Two club Crawley Town on 11 July 2016. He scored his first goal for Crawley in a 1–1 draw with Doncaster Rovers on 13 August 2016.

=== Luton Town ===
On 29 June 2017, Collins signed a three-year contract with League Two club Luton Town for an undisclosed fee. On his Luton debut on 5 August 2017, he scored a hat-trick in an 8–2 win over Yeovil Town.

His contract was extended by a further year at the end of the 2017–18 season after a promotion clause was triggered as a result of Luton's promotion to League One.

In the 2018–19 season Collins was named the League One Player of the Year at the EFL Awards as he helped Luton to back-to-back promotions after scoring 25 goals as they move up to the Championship.

Collins scored his first second-tier goal of his career against Middlesbrough on the opening night of the 2019–20 season. He went on to score 14 goals in total in the Championship, becoming Luton's top scorer for the second season running.

On 12 December 2020, Collins scored his second hat-trick of his Luton career, in a 3–0 win against Preston North End.

=== Cardiff City ===
Collins rejected a new contract with Luton at the end of the 2020–21 season and signed for fellow Championship club Cardiff City on a two-year contract. He scored his first goal for Cardiff in a 2–1 win against Preston North End on 20 November 2021. Collins spent two years at Cardiff scored three times in 30 appearances, he left the club with a year left on his contract.

=== Derby County ===
Collins signed for League One Derby County, signing a two-year contract on 13 July 2022. Collins would score 12 times in 52 games for Derby in the 2022–23 season, with Collins scoring twice against Cambridge United on 1 October 2022 in Paul Warne's first game as manager being the highlight.

On 23 September 2023, Collins scored a brace in a 2–0 win at Carlisle United the second of which was his 200th goal in senior club football. Collins would score his first hat-trick for Derby in a 4–1 win over Wolverhampton Wanderers U-21s in the EFL Trophy on 8 November 2023. He would follow this up on 11 November 2023, with two in Derby's 3–0 league win against Barnsley on 11 November 2023, also at Pride Park Stadium. By the end of January 2024, Collins had scored 18 goals during the season for Derby in all competitions, with 13 of these coming in the league. After scoring four league goals in the month of January, Collins was named the PFA League One fans Player of the Month for January. In Derby's match at Exeter City on 13 February 2024, Collins received treatment for a knee injury, but was able to complete the match, two days later Collins was due to go for scan for to assess the damage to his knee, with a worst-case scenario being Collins missing the season. On 17 February 2024, the scan results stated that Collins was expected to be out of action until mid-April minimum. Collins was able to return six weeks ahead of schedule in March 2024, after Derby medics were able to perform "platelet therapy" on Collins where a sample of his blood was taken, then spun before it was injected back into his knee which enabled to ligament to be able to be attached back to the knee, this reduced a potential 12 week layoff to 6. Collins scored the second goal in Derby's 2–0 over Carlisle United on 27 April 2024, the result which ensured Derby finish runners-up in the division and earn promotion to the Championship automatically. Collins scored 19 times in 46 appearances during the season; being Derby's top scorer during the season.

On 18 May 2024, Derby County confirmed that Collins was in talks to extend his contract at Derby with his deal expiring in June 2024. On 2 July 2024, Collins signed a one-year contract extension at Derby, extending his stay at the club until June 2025. Collins failed to score for Derby during the 2024–25 season, starting only twice on 20 first team appearances. Collins scored 31 times in 118 appearances over his two-and-a-half years at Derby.

=== Lincoln City ===
On 20 January 2025, Collins signed for Lincoln City on an 18-month deal, with an option of another year. He made his debut against Peterborough United coming off the bench to score and make the game 5–1. In December 2025, it was confirmed that Collins has ruptured an anterior cruciate ligament in the EFL Trophy game against Huddersfield Town and would be missing the rest of the season, having been told he requires surgery. The next month City would trigger the option in his contract, extending his deal until the summer of 2027.

With Collins ahead of his rehabilitation, Lincoln City decided to loan him to League One club Doncaster Rovers on 1 September 2026 until January, so he could get game time in November and December, where Lincoln wouldn't be in a position to play him due to squad limits.

== International career ==
Collins, who was born and raised in England, is also eligible to represent the Republic of Ireland at international level through his parents. He has represented Ireland at under-19 and under-21 levels. On 11 October 2011, Collins scored his first hat-trick of his international career, as Republic of Ireland under-21 beat Liechtenstein U-21, with a score 4–1. Upon a move to Hibernian, Collins hoped that his performances would get him a call-up to the senior squad.

He received his first call-up to the senior national team in March 2019, when Mick McCarthy named him in a 38-man provisional selection for UEFA Euro 2020 qualifiers against Gibraltar and Georgia.

Collins made his full international debut for Ireland on 10 September 2019, coming off the bench to score the third goal in a 3–1 win against Bulgaria at the Aviva Stadium.

On 24 March 2021, Collins scored his first competitive goal for Ireland in a 3–2 defeat away to Serbia in the 2022 FIFA World Cup qualifiers.

== Personal life ==
Collins's mother was born in Mullingar, County Westmeath, and moved to England at the age of four. Collins became a father for the first time in 2015, and was given paternity leave by Shrewsbury Town.

In October 2011, Collins was arrested along with former Aston Villa teammate Barry Bannan after a Range Rover hit the central reservation of the M1 motorway in Nottinghamshire. The following month, Nottinghamshire Police confirmed that he would not face any charges, although Bannan was charged with four offences.

On 15 March 2016, whilst attending the Cheltenham Festival at Cheltenham Racecourse, Collins and Milton Keynes Dons' Samir Carruthers were photographed urinating into a beer glass before Collins poured it over a balcony. The next day, Collins apologised for his behaviour and was fined two weeks' wages.

== Career statistics ==
=== Club ===
As of 21 November 2026

Appearances and goals by club, season and competition
Club	Season	League			National Cup (Note: Includes FA Cup, Scottish Cup)		League Cup (Note: Includes Football League Cup/EFL Cup, Scottish League Cup)		Other		Total	
Club	Season	Division	Apps	Goals	Apps	Goals	Apps	Goals	Apps	Goals	Apps	Goals
Aston Villa	2009–10	Premier League	0	0	—		0	0	0	0	0	0
Aston Villa	2010–11	Premier League	0	0	—		0	0	0	0	0	0
Aston Villa	Total		0	0	—		0	0	0	0	0	0
Darlington (loan)	2009–10	League Two	7	2	1	0	—		—		8	2
Burton Albion (loan)	2010–11	League Two	10	4	2	1	—		—		12	5
Shrewsbury Town	2010–11	League Two	24	8	—		—		2 (Note: Appearances in League Two play-offs)	0	26	8
Shrewsbury Town	2011–12	League Two	42	14	2	0	3	2	0	0	47	16
Shrewsbury Town	Total		66	22	2	0	3	2	2	0	73	24
Swindon Town	2012–13	League One	45	15	1	0	3	3	2 (Note: Appearances in League One play-offs)	0	51	18
Hibernian	2013–14	Scottish Premiership	36	6	2	0	2	0	—		40	6
Shrewsbury Town	2014–15	League Two	45	15	3	1	4	1	1 (Note: Appearance in Football League Trophy)	0	53	17
Shrewsbury Town	2015–16	League One	23	5	3	1	2	1	0	0	28	7
Shrewsbury Town	Total		68	20	6	2	6	2	1	0	81	24
Northampton Town (loan)	2015–16	League Two	21	8	—		—		—		21	8
Crawley Town	2016–17	League Two	45	20	2	0	1	0	3 (Note: Appearances in EFL Trophy)	2	51	22
Luton Town	2017–18	League Two	42	19	2	1	1	0	0	0	45	20
Luton Town	2018–19	League One	44	25	4	0	0	0	0	0	48	25
Luton Town	2019–20	Championship	46	14	0	0	0	0	—		46	14
Luton Town	2020–21	Championship	42	10	1	0	1	3	—		44	13
Luton Town	Total		174	68	7	1	2	3	0	0	183	72
Cardiff City	2021–22	Championship	26	3	2	0	2	0	—		30	3
Derby County	2022–23	League One	42	11	5	1	3	0	2	0	52	12
Derby County	2023–24	League One	38	14	2	0	1	0	4	5	46	19
Derby County	2024–25	Championship	17	0	1	0	2	0	—		20	0
Derby County	Total		97	25	8	1	6	0	7	5	118	31
Lincoln City	2024–25	League One	20	10	—		—		—		20	10
Lincoln City	2025–26	League One	18	4	1	0	3	0	3	2	25	6
Lincoln City	2026–27	Championship	0	0	0	0	0	0	—		0	0
Lincoln City	Total		38	14	1	0	3	0	3	2	45	16
Doncaster Rovers (loan)	2026–27	League One	1	0	0	0	—		0	0	1	0
Career total			633	206	34	5	28	10	18	9	712	230

=== International ===
As of match played 1 September 2021

Appearances and goals by national team and year
National team	Year	Apps	Goals
Republic of Ireland	2019	4	1
Republic of Ireland	2020	2	0
Republic of Ireland	2021	7	1
Total		13	2

As of match played 27 March 2021. Republic of Ireland score listed first, score column indicates score after each Collins goal.

List of international goals scored by James Collins
No.	Date	Venue	Cap	Opponent	Score	Result	Competition	Ref.
1	10 September 2019	Aviva Stadium, Dublin, Ireland	1	Bulgaria	3–1	3–1	Friendly	
2	24 March 2021	Stadion Rajko Mitić, Belgrade, Serbia	7	Serbia	2–3	2–3	2022 FIFA World Cup qualification	

== Honours ==
Shrewsbury Town

- Football League Two second-place promotion: 2011–12, 2014–15

Northampton Town

- Football League Two: 2015–16

Luton Town

- EFL League One: 2018–19
- EFL League Two second-place promotion: 2017–18

Derby County

- EFL League One second-place promotion: 2023–24

Lincoln City

- EFL League One: 2025–26

Individual

- PFA Team of the Year: 2018–19 League One
