= Ibrahim Meite (footballer) =

English footballer

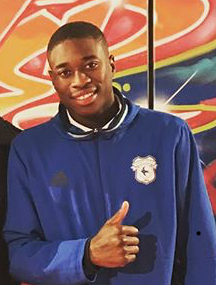

Personal information
- Full name: Ibrahim Meite
- Date of birth: 29 July 1996 (age 30)
- Place of birth: Roehampton, England
- Height: 6 ft 1 in (1.85 m)
- Position: Forward

Team information
- Current team: Hendon

Youth career
- AG Academy

Senior career*
Years	Team	Apps	(Gls)
2016–2017	Harrow Borough	16	(6)
2017–2019	Cardiff City	1	(0)
2017–2018	→ Crawley Town (loan)	19	(2)
2019–2020	Crawley Town	2	(0)
2019–2020	→ Woking (loan)	15	(4)
2020	→ Pirin Blagoevgrad (loan)	1	(0)
2020	Derry City	8	(1)
2021	Wingate & Finchley	10	(3)
2024–2025	Hendon	3	(0)
2025	Weymouth	6	(0)
- * Club domestic league appearances and goals as of 19:07, 2 March 2025 (UTC)

Ibrahim Meite (born 29 July 1996) is an English footballer who plays as a striker.

== Career ==
Meite was born to Ivorian parents and raised in a council estate in Roehampton, London Borough of Wandsworth. After playing for AG Academy and Harrow Borough, Meite trialled with Leicester City (in October 2016) and Cardiff City (in December 2016). He turned professional with Cardiff City in January 2017, making his debut for the club as a substitute in place of Craig Noone during a 0–0 draw with Wigan Athletic on 22 April 2017.

On 25 August 2017, Meite joined League Two side Crawley Town on loan until January 2018.

After being released by Cardiff, Meite returned to Crawley on a permanent deal in February 2019.

On 3 August 2019 it was announced that Meite would be joining National League side Woking on a one-month loan. The loan was extended for a further month on 2 September 2019, which was then extended again on 4 October 2019 until 30 January 2020. On 4 March 2020, Meite then joined Bulgarian Second Professional Football League side Pirin Blagoevgrad on loan until the end of the season.

He was released by Crawley at the end of the 2019–20 season.

In July 2020, Meite joined League of Ireland Premier Division side Derry City on a deal until the end of the 2020 season. Meite later left the club in December, following just 11 appearances all season.

On 27 August 2021, Meite signed for Isthmian League Premier Division side, Wingate & Finchley and went onto score on his debut during a 4–1 away defeat to Haringey Borough.

In December 2024, Meite returned to football, joining Isthmian League Premier Division side Hendon. The following month, he joined Weymouth on a non-contract basis.

== Personal life ==
In January 2018, Meite was charged with drink-driving at Brighton Magistrates' Court, following a speeding offence in Hove on 31 December 2017. He was banned from driving for 17 months and made to pay a £380 fine plus £85 costs and £38 victim surcharge.

In July 2020 he was charged with stabbing a man in September 2019 in Putney. In early 2022 he went on trial, accused of stabbing a man in the back in a "premeditated and not provoked attack" in a London street. In the same incident he was also stabbed running away by the person he was alleged to have stabbed.

On 15 December 2022, Meite was sentenced to 15 months in prison.

== Career statistics ==
As of match played 11 February 2025

Appearances and goals by club, season and competition
Club	Season	League			National Cup		League Cup		Other		Total	
Club	Season	Division	Apps	Goals	Apps	Goals	Apps	Goals	Apps	Goals	Apps	Goals
Harrow Borough	2016–17	Isthmian League Premier Division	16	6	6	4	—		6 (Note: Two appearances and three goals in Alan Turvey Trophy, four appearances in FA Trophy.)	3	28	13
Cardiff City	2016–17	Championship	1	0	0	0	0	0	—		1	0
Cardiff City	2017–18	Championship	0	0	0	0	1	0	—		1	0
Cardiff City	2018–19	Premier League	0	0	0	0	0	0	—		0	0
Cardiff City	Total		1	0	0	0	1	0	0	0	2	0
Crawley Town (loan)	2017–18	League Two	19	2	0	0	0	0	3 (Note: Appearances in EFL Trophy.)	1	22	3
Crawley Town	2018–19	League Two	2	0	0	0	0	0	—		2	0
Crawley Town	2019–20	League Two	0	0	0	0	0	0	—		0	0
Crawley Town	Total		2	0	0	0	0	0	0	0	2	0
Woking (loan)	2019–20	National League	15	4	2	0	—		1 (Note: Appearance in FA Trophy.)	0	18	4
Pirin Blagoevgrad (loan)	2019–20	Bulgarian Second League	1	0	0	0	0	0	0	0	1	0
Derry City	2020	League of Ireland Premier Division	8	1	2	0	0	0	1 (Note: Appearances in UEFA Europa League.)	0	11	1
Wingate & Finchley	2021–22	Isthmian League Premier Division	10	3	4	3	—		2	0	16	6
Hendon	2024–25	Isthmian League Premier Division	3	0	0	0	—		0	0	3	0
Weymouth	2024–25	National League South	6	0	0	0	—		0	0	6	0
Career total			81	16	14	7	1	0	13	4	109	27
