= 2011–12 in German football =

Football in Germany
- Season: 2011–12

Men's football
- Bundesliga: Borussia Dortmund
- 2. Bundesliga: SpVgg Greuther Fürth
- 3. Liga: SV Sandhausen
- DFB-Pokal: Borussia Dortmund
- DFL-Supercup: Schalke 04

Women's football
- Frauen-Bundesliga: Turbine Potsdam
- DFB-Pokal: Bayern Munich

The 2011–12 season is the 102nd season of competitive football in Germany.

== Men's national team ==
The home team is on the left column; the away team is on the right column.

Win Draw Loss

=== Friendly matches ===
| 10 August 2011 | Germany | 3 – 2 | Brazil | Stuttgart, Germany |
| 20:45 CEST | Schweinsteiger 61' (pen.); Götze 67'; Schürrle 80' | report | 71' (pen.) Robinho; 90' Neymar | Stadium: Mercedes-Benz Arena; Attendance: 54,767; Referee: Viktor Kassai (Hungary) |

| 6 September 2011 | Poland | 2 – 2 | Germany | Gdańsk, Poland |
| 20:45 CEST | Lewandowski 55'; Błaszczykowski 90' (pen.) | report | 68' (pen.) Kroos; 90' Cacau | Stadium: PGE Arena; Attendance: 40,000; Referee: Daniele Orsato (Italy) |

| 11 November 2011 | Ukraine | 3 – 3 | Germany | Kyiv, Ukraine |
| 20:45 CET | Yarmolenko 28'; Konoplyanka 36'; Nazarenko 45' | Report | 38' Kroos; 65' Rolfes; 77' Müller | Stadium: Olimpiysky National Sports Complex; Attendance: 69,720; Referee: Carlos Velasco Carballo (Spain) |

| 15 November 2011 | Germany | 3 – 0 | Netherlands | Hamburg, Germany |
| 20:45 CET | Müller 15'; Klose 26'; Özil 66' | | | Stadium: Imtech Arena |

| 29 February 2012 | Germany | 1 – 2 | France | Bremen, Germany |
| 20:45 CET | Cacau 90+1' | Report | 21' Giroud; 69' Malouda | Stadium: Weserstadion; Attendance: 37,800; Referee: Paolo Tagliavento (Italy) |

| 26 May 2012 | Switzerland | 5 – 3 | Germany | Basel, Switzerland |
| 18:00 CEST | Derdiyok 21', 23', 50'; Lichtsteiner 67'; Mehmedi 76' | Report | Hummels 45'; Schürrle 64'; Reus 72' | Stadium: St. Jakob-Park; Attendance: 32,000; Referee: Antony Gautier (France) |

| 31 May 2012 | Germany | 2 – 0 | Israel | Leipzig, Germany |
| | | | | Stadium: Red Bull Arena |

=== Euro 2012 qualifying ===
The German men's national team were drawn into UEFA Euro 2012 qualifying Group A.

All fixtures for this group were negotiated between the participants at a meeting in Frankfurt, Germany on 21 and 22 February 2010.

| Pos | Team | Pld | W | D | L | GF | GA | GD | Pts | Qualification |
|---|---|---|---|---|---|---|---|---|---|---|
| 1 | Germany | 10 | 10 | 0 | 0 | 34 | 7 | +27 | 30 | Qualify for final tournament |
| 2 | Turkey | 10 | 5 | 2 | 3 | 13 | 11 | +2 | 17 | Advance to play-offs |
| 3 | Belgium | 10 | 4 | 3 | 3 | 21 | 15 | +6 | 15 | |
| 4 | Austria | 10 | 3 | 3 | 4 | 16 | 17 | −1 | 12 | |
| 5 | Azerbaijan | 10 | 2 | 1 | 7 | 10 | 26 | −16 | 7 | |
| 6 | Kazakhstan | 10 | 1 | 1 | 8 | 6 | 24 | −18 | 4 | |

Source: UEFA
Rules for classification: Qualification tiebreakers

| 2 September 2011 | Germany | 6 – 2 | Austria | Gelsenkirchen, Germany |
| 20:45 CEST | Klose 8'; Özil 24', 47'; Podolski 28'; Schürrle 84'; Götze 88' | report | 42' Arnautović; 51' Harnik 51' | Stadium: Veltins-Arena; Attendance: 53,313; Referee: Paolo Tagliavento (Italy) |

| 7 October 2011 | Turkey | 1 – 3 | Germany | Istanbul, Turkey |
| 20:30 CET | Balta 79' | report | 35' Gómez; 66' Müller; 86' (pen.) Schweinsteiger | Stadium: Şükrü Saracoğlu Stadium; Attendance: 50,000; Referee: Martin Atkinson (England) |

| 11 October 2011 | Germany | 3 – 1 | Belgium | Düsseldorf, Germany |
| 19:00 CET | Özil 30'; Schürrle 33'; Gómez 38' | report | 86' Fellaini | Stadium: Esprit Arena; Attendance: 48,483; Referee: Svein Oddvar Moen (Norway) |

=== UEFA Euro 2012 ===
==== Group stage ====
| Pos | Team | Pld | W | D | L | GF | GA | GD | Pts | Qualification |
|---|---|---|---|---|---|---|---|---|---|---|
| 1 | Germany | 3 | 3 | 0 | 0 | 5 | 2 | +3 | 9 | Advance to knockout stage |
| 2 | Portugal | 3 | 2 | 0 | 1 | 5 | 4 | +1 | 6 | Advance to knockout stage |
| 3 | Denmark | 3 | 1 | 0 | 2 | 4 | 5 | −1 | 3 | |
| 4 | Netherlands | 3 | 0 | 0 | 3 | 2 | 5 | −3 | 0 | |

Source: UEFA
Rules for classification: Group stage tiebreakers

| 9 June 2012 Group B round 1 | Germany | 1–0 | Portugal | Lviv, Ukraine |
| 21:45 EEST | Badstuber (yellow card) 43'; Boateng (yellow card) 69'; Gómez 72' | Report | Postiga (yellow card) 13'; Coentrão (yellow card) 60' | Stadium: Arena Lviv; Referee: Stéphane Lannoy (France) |

| 13 June 2012 Group B round 2 | Netherlands | 1–2 | Germany | Kharkiv, Ukraine |
| 21:45 EEST | van Persie 73' de Jong (yellow card) 80'; Willems (yellow card) 90' | Report | Gómez 24', 38'; Boateng (yellow card) 87' | Stadium: Metalist Stadium; Referee: Jonas Eriksson (Sweden) |

| 17 June 2012 Group B round 3 | Denmark | 1–2 | Germany | Lviv, Ukraine |
| 21:45 EEST | Krohn-Dehli 24' | Report | Podolski 19'; Bender 80' | Stadium: Arena Lviv; Referee: Carlos Velasco Carballo (Spain) |

==== Knockout stage ====
| 22 June 2012 Quarter-finals | Germany | 4–2 | Greece | Gdańsk, Poland |
| 20:45 CEST | Lahm 39'; Khedira 61'; Klose 68'; Reus 74' | Report | Samaras (yellow card) 14' (goal) 55'; Papastathopoulos (yellow card) 75'; Salpingidis 89' (pen.) | Stadium: PGE Arena Gdańsk; Referee: Damir Skomina (Slovenia) |

| 28 June 2012 Semi-finals | Germany | 1–2 | Italy | Warsaw, Poland |
| 20:45 CEST | Özil 90+2' (pen.); Hummels (yellow card) 90+4' | Report | Balotelli 20', 36' (yellow card) 37'; Bonucci (yellow card) 61'; De Rossi (yellow card) 84'; Motta (yellow card) 89' | Stadium: National Stadium; Referee: Stéphane Lannoy (France) |

== Women's national team ==
The home team is on the left column; the away team is on the right column.

Win Draw Loss

=== Euro 2013 qualifying ===
| 17 September 2011 | Germany | 4 – 1 | Switzerland | Augsburg, Germany |
| 15:45 | Bajramaj 32', 66'; Bresonik 73'; Müller 79' | report | Bachmann 68' | Stadium: Impuls Arena; Referee: Silvia Tea Spinelli (Italy) |

| 22 October 2011 | Romania | 0 – 3 | Germany | Bucharest, Romania |
| 16:00 | | report | Goeßling 21'; Bajramaj 56'; Behringer 59' (pen.) | Stadium: Stadionul Mogoşoaia; Referee: Jana Adámková (Czech Republic) |

| 19 November 2011 | Germany | 17 – 0 | Kazakhstan | Wiesbaden, Germany |
| 15:45 | Okoyino da Mbabi 3', 10', 14', 16'; Popp 5', 11', 31', 59'; Laudehr 23', 41'; Behringer 36' (pen.); Bajramaj 51'; Peter 62', 65', 89'; Müller 74', 85' | report | | Stadium: Brita Arena; Referee: Carina Vitulano (Italy) |

| 24 November 2011 | Spain | 2 – 2 | Germany | Motril, Spain |
| 20:30 | Boquete 57'; Romero 90+1' | report | Goeßling 27'; García 30' (o.g.) | Referee: Kateryna Monzul (Ukraine) |

| 15 February 2012 | Turkey | 0 – 5 | Germany | İzmir, Turkey |
| 16:00 | | report | Marozsán 10'; Okoyino da Mbabi 11'; Bresonik 71'; Behringer 76', 90' | Stadium: Buca Arena; Referee: Gordana Kuzmanović (Serbia) |

| 31 March 2012 | Germany | 5 – 0 | Spain | Mannheim, Germany |
| 16:00 | Okoyino da Mbabi 24', 58', 68', 86'; Popp 61' | report | | Stadium: Carl-Benz-Stadion; Referee: Efthalia Mitsi (Greece) |

| 5 April 2012 | Switzerland | 0 – 6 | Germany | Aarau, Switzerland |
| 18:15 | | report | Okoyino da Mbabi 16', 38', 71', 85'; Mittag 24'; Egli 64' (o.g.) | Stadium: Stadion Brügglifeld; Referee: Tanja Schett (Austria) |

| 31 May 2012 | Germany | 5 – 0 | Romania | Bielefeld, Germany |
| 18:00 | Bresonik 1'; Popp 35', 50', 90'; Marozsán 40' | report | | Stadium: Schüco Arena; Attendance: 8,183; Referee: Alexandra Ihringova (England) |

=== 2012 Algarve Cup ===
| 29 February 2012 Group stage | Germany | 1 – 0 | Iceland | Lagos, Portugal |
| 14:00 WET | Mittag 25' | report | | Stadium: Estádio Municipal |

| 2 March 2012 Group stage | Germany | 1 – 0 | China | Santo António, Portugal |
| 15:00 WET | Behringer 33' (pen.) | Report | | Stadium: Estádio Municipal |

| 5 March 2012 Group stage | Sweden | 0 – 4 | Germany | Parchal, Portugal |
| 15:00 WET | | Report | Okoyino da Mbabi 24', 31', 65'; Popp 90+2' | Stadium: Estádio Municipal |

| 7 March 2012 Final | Germany | 4 – 3 | Japan | Faro, Portugal |
| 13:10 WET | Marozsán 20'; Okoyino da Mbabi 22', 88', 90+2' | Report | Kawasumi 35'; Tanaka 55'; Nagasoto 90' | Stadium: Estádio Algarve |

=== Friendly match ===
| 26 October 2011 | Germany | 1 – 0 | Sweden | Hamburg, Germany |
| 18:00 CEST | Popp 60' | report | | Stadium: Millerntorstadion; Attendance: 12,183; Referee: Thalia Mitsi (Greece) |

== League season ==
=== Bundesliga ===
| Pos | Team | Pld | W | D | L | GF | GA | GD | Pts | Qualification or relegation |
|---|---|---|---|---|---|---|---|---|---|---|
| 1 | Borussia Dortmund (C) | 34 | 25 | 6 | 3 | 80 | 25 | +55 | 81 | Qualification to Champions League group stage |
| 2 | Bayern Munich | 34 | 23 | 4 | 7 | 77 | 22 | +55 | 73 | Qualification to Champions League group stage |
| 3 | Schalke 04 | 34 | 20 | 4 | 10 | 74 | 44 | +30 | 64 | Qualification to Champions League group stage |
| 4 | Borussia Mönchengladbach | 34 | 17 | 9 | 8 | 49 | 24 | +25 | 60 | Qualification to Champions League play-off round |
| 5 | Bayer Leverkusen | 34 | 15 | 9 | 10 | 52 | 44 | +8 | 54 | Qualification to Europa League group stage (Note: The 2011–12 DFB-Pokal champions (Borussia Dortmund) and runners-up (Bayern Munich) qualified for the 2012–13 UEFA Champions League, thus the three Europa League places were distributed through league positions.) |
| 6 | VfB Stuttgart | 34 | 15 | 8 | 11 | 63 | 46 | +17 | 53 | Qualification to Europa League play-off round |
| 7 | Hannover 96 | 34 | 12 | 12 | 10 | 41 | 45 | −4 | 48 | Qualification to Europa League third qualifying round |
| 8 | VfL Wolfsburg | 34 | 13 | 5 | 16 | 47 | 60 | −13 | 44 | |
| 9 | Werder Bremen | 34 | 11 | 9 | 14 | 49 | 58 | −9 | 42 | |
| 10 | 1. FC Nürnberg | 34 | 12 | 6 | 16 | 38 | 49 | −11 | 42 | |
| 11 | 1899 Hoffenheim | 34 | 10 | 11 | 13 | 41 | 47 | −6 | 41 | |
| 12 | SC Freiburg | 34 | 10 | 10 | 14 | 45 | 61 | −16 | 40 | |
| 13 | FSV Mainz 05 | 34 | 9 | 12 | 13 | 47 | 51 | −4 | 39 | |
| 14 | FC Augsburg | 34 | 8 | 14 | 12 | 36 | 49 | −13 | 38 | |
| 15 | Hamburger SV | 34 | 8 | 12 | 14 | 35 | 57 | −22 | 36 | |
| 16 | Hertha BSC (R) | 34 | 7 | 10 | 17 | 38 | 64 | −26 | 31 | Qualification to relegation play-offs |
| 17 | 1. FC Köln (R) | 34 | 8 | 6 | 20 | 39 | 75 | −36 | 30 | Relegation to 2. Bundesliga |
| 18 | 1. FC Kaiserslautern (R) | 34 | 4 | 11 | 19 | 24 | 54 | −30 | 23 | Relegation to 2. Bundesliga |

Source: kicker
Rules for classification: 1) points; 2) goal difference; 3) number of goals scored.
(C) Champions; (R) Relegated

=== 2. Bundesliga ===
| Pos | Team | Pld | W | D | L | GF | GA | GD | Pts | Promotion, qualification or relegation |
|---|---|---|---|---|---|---|---|---|---|---|
| 1 | Greuther Fürth (C, P) | 34 | 20 | 10 | 4 | 73 | 27 | +46 | 70 | Promotion to Bundesliga |
| 2 | Eintracht Frankfurt (P) | 34 | 20 | 8 | 6 | 76 | 33 | +43 | 68 | Promotion to Bundesliga |
| 3 | Fortuna Düsseldorf (O, P) | 34 | 16 | 14 | 4 | 64 | 35 | +29 | 62 | Qualification for promotion play-offs |
| 4 | FC St. Pauli | 34 | 18 | 8 | 8 | 59 | 34 | +25 | 62 | |
| 5 | SC Paderborn | 34 | 17 | 10 | 7 | 51 | 42 | +9 | 61 | |
| 6 | 1860 Munich | 34 | 17 | 6 | 11 | 62 | 46 | +16 | 57 | |
| 7 | Union Berlin | 34 | 14 | 6 | 14 | 55 | 58 | −3 | 48 | |
| 8 | Eintracht Braunschweig | 34 | 10 | 15 | 9 | 37 | 35 | +2 | 45 | |
| 9 | Dynamo Dresden | 34 | 12 | 9 | 13 | 50 | 52 | −2 | 45 | |
| 10 | MSV Duisburg | 34 | 10 | 9 | 15 | 42 | 47 | −5 | 39 | |
| 11 | VfL Bochum | 34 | 10 | 7 | 17 | 41 | 55 | −14 | 37 | |
| 12 | FC Ingolstadt | 34 | 8 | 13 | 13 | 43 | 58 | −15 | 37 | |
| 13 | FSV Frankfurt | 34 | 7 | 14 | 13 | 43 | 59 | −16 | 35 | |
| 14 | Energie Cottbus | 34 | 8 | 11 | 15 | 30 | 49 | −19 | 35 | |
| 15 | Erzgebirge Aue | 34 | 8 | 11 | 15 | 31 | 55 | −24 | 35 | |
| 16 | Karlsruher SC (R) | 34 | 9 | 6 | 19 | 34 | 60 | −26 | 33 | Qualification for relegation play-offs |
| 17 | Alemannia Aachen (R) | 34 | 6 | 13 | 15 | 30 | 47 | −17 | 31 | Relegation to 3. Liga |
| 18 | Hansa Rostock (R) | 34 | 5 | 12 | 17 | 34 | 63 | −29 | 27 | Relegation to 3. Liga |

Source: kicker
Rules for classification: 1) points; 2) goal difference; 3) number of goals scored.
(C) Champions; (O) Play-off winners; (P) Promoted; (R) Relegated

=== 3. Liga ===
| Pos | Team | Pld | W | D | L | GF | GA | GD | Pts | Promotion, qualification or relegation |
|---|---|---|---|---|---|---|---|---|---|---|
| 1 | SV Sandhausen (C, P) | 38 | 19 | 9 | 10 | 57 | 42 | +15 | 66 | Promotion to 2. Bundesliga and qualification for DFB-Pokal |
| 2 | VfR Aalen (P) | 38 | 18 | 10 | 10 | 50 | 42 | +8 | 64 | Promotion to 2. Bundesliga and qualification for DFB-Pokal |
| 3 | Jahn Regensburg (O, P) | 38 | 16 | 13 | 9 | 55 | 41 | +14 | 61 | Qualification to promotion play-offs and DFB-Pokal |
| 4 | 1. FC Heidenheim | 38 | 16 | 12 | 10 | 48 | 36 | +12 | 60 | Qualification for DFB-Pokal |
| 5 | Rot-Weiß Erfurt | 38 | 15 | 14 | 9 | 54 | 41 | +13 | 59 | |
| 6 | Wacker Burghausen | 38 | 13 | 18 | 7 | 55 | 47 | +8 | 57 | |
| 7 | VfL Osnabrück | 38 | 14 | 13 | 11 | 46 | 35 | +11 | 55 | |
| 8 | Kickers Offenbach | 38 | 15 | 10 | 13 | 49 | 41 | +8 | 55 | |
| 9 | Chemnitzer FC | 38 | 15 | 10 | 13 | 47 | 43 | +4 | 55 | |
| 10 | 1. FC Saarbrücken | 38 | 13 | 15 | 10 | 61 | 51 | +10 | 54 | |
| 11 | VfB Stuttgart II (Note: Reserve teams are ineligible for promotion or DFB-Pokal qualification.) | 38 | 12 | 14 | 12 | 44 | 47 | −3 | 50 | |
| 12 | Preußen Münster | 38 | 12 | 14 | 12 | 40 | 44 | −4 | 50 | |
| 13 | Arminia Bielefeld | 38 | 12 | 14 | 12 | 51 | 57 | −6 | 50 | |
| 14 | SV Darmstadt 98 | 38 | 12 | 13 | 13 | 51 | 47 | +4 | 49 | |
| 15 | SpVgg Unterhaching | 38 | 12 | 8 | 18 | 63 | 59 | +4 | 44 | |
| 16 | SV Wehen Wiesbaden | 38 | 10 | 14 | 14 | 40 | 48 | −8 | 44 | |
| 17 | SV Babelsberg 03 | 38 | 11 | 11 | 16 | 44 | 59 | −15 | 44 | |
| 18 | Carl Zeiss Jena (R) | 38 | 9 | 12 | 17 | 39 | 59 | −20 | 39 | Relegation to Regionalliga |
| 19 | Rot-Weiß Oberhausen (R) | 38 | 8 | 14 | 16 | 33 | 47 | −14 | 38 | Relegation to Regionalliga |
| 20 | Werder Bremen II (R) | 38 | 4 | 10 | 24 | 29 | 70 | −41 | 22 | Relegation to Regionalliga |

Source: kicker
Rules for classification: 1) points; 2) goal difference; 3) number of goals scored.
(C) Champions; (O) Play-off winners; (P) Promoted; (R) Relegated

=== Bundesliga (women) ===
| Pos | Team | Pld | W | D | L | GF | GA | GD | Pts | Qualification or relegation |
|---|---|---|---|---|---|---|---|---|---|---|
| 1 | 1. FFC Turbine Potsdam (C) | 22 | 18 | 2 | 2 | 63 | 10 | +53 | 56 | 2012–13 UEFA Champions League round of 32 |
| 2 | VfL Wolfsburg (P) | 22 | 17 | 2 | 3 | 62 | 18 | +44 | 53 | 2012–13 UEFA Champions League round of 32 |
| 3 | 1. FFC Frankfurt | 22 | 15 | 1 | 6 | 58 | 17 | +41 | 46 | |
| 4 | FCR 2001 Duisburg | 22 | 14 | 3 | 5 | 53 | 24 | +29 | 45 | |
| 5 | SG Essen-Schönebeck | 22 | 9 | 4 | 9 | 30 | 28 | +2 | 31 | |
| 6 | FC Bayern Munich | 22 | 8 | 4 | 10 | 29 | 38 | −9 | 28 | |
| 7 | SC 07 Bad Neuenahr | 22 | 7 | 5 | 10 | 26 | 22 | +4 | 26 | |
| 8 | SC Freiburg | 22 | 6 | 5 | 11 | 22 | 43 | −21 | 23 | |
| 9 | Hamburger SV (R) | 22 | 5 | 7 | 10 | 23 | 40 | −17 | 22 | Relegation to 2012–13 Regionalliga (Note: Hamburg decided to withdraw their team from the first two Bundesligas for monetary reasons.) |
| 10 | FF USV Jena | 22 | 5 | 3 | 14 | 16 | 46 | −30 | 18 | |
| 11 | Bayer 04 Leverkusen | 22 | 4 | 3 | 15 | 22 | 55 | −33 | 15 | |
| 12 | 1. FC Lokomotive Leipzig (R) | 22 | 4 | 1 | 17 | 16 | 79 | −63 | 13 | Relegation to 2012–13 2. Bundesliga |

Updated to match(es) played on 28 May 2012. Source: soccerway.com
Rules for classification: 1) points; 2) goal difference; 3) number of goals scored.
(C) Champions; (P) Promoted; (R) Relegated

=== 2. Bundesliga (women) ===
North
| Pos | Team | Pld | W | D | L | GF | GA | GD | Pts | Qualification or relegation |
|---|---|---|---|---|---|---|---|---|---|---|
| 1 | Turbine Potsdam II (C) | 22 | 17 | 3 | 2 | 77 | 16 | +61 | 54 | |
| 2 | FSV Gütersloh 2009 (P) | 22 | 16 | 4 | 2 | 79 | 15 | +64 | 52 | Promotion to 2012–13 Bundesliga (Note: The reserve team of Potsdam won the title but is ineligible for promotion due to the first team playing in the Bundesliga. Gütersloh as the next placed team were given the spot.) |
| 3 | BV Cloppenburg | 22 | 14 | 3 | 5 | 58 | 28 | +30 | 45 | |
| 4 | Herforder SV Borussia Friedenstal | 22 | 13 | 4 | 5 | 62 | 27 | +35 | 43 | |
| 5 | Werder Bremen | 22 | 9 | 4 | 9 | 38 | 37 | +1 | 31 | |
| 6 | Magdeburger FFC | 22 | 8 | 4 | 10 | 29 | 34 | −5 | 28 | |
| 7 | SV Meppen | 22 | 7 | 5 | 10 | 32 | 38 | −6 | 26 | |
| 8 | 1. FC Lübars | 22 | 7 | 4 | 11 | 23 | 42 | −19 | 25 | |
| 9 | FF USV Jena II | 22 | 6 | 6 | 10 | 31 | 35 | −4 | 24 | |
| 10 | FFC Oldesloe | 22 | 6 | 3 | 13 | 24 | 58 | −34 | 21 | |
| 11 | FCR 2001 Duisburg II (R) | 22 | 5 | 5 | 12 | 26 | 47 | −21 | 20 | Relegation to 2012–13 Regionalliga |
| 12 | Mellendorfer TV (R) | 22 | 1 | 1 | 20 | 19 | 122 | −103 | 4 | Relegation to 2012–13 Regionalliga |

Updated to match(es) played on 28 May 2012. Source: kicker.de (in German)
Rules for classification: 1) points; 2) goal difference; 3) number of goals scored.
(C) Champions; (P) Promoted; (R) Relegated
Notes:

South
| Pos | Team | Pld | W | D | L | GF | GA | GD | Pts | Qualification or relegation |
|---|---|---|---|---|---|---|---|---|---|---|
| 1 | VfL Sindelfingen (C, P) | 22 | 18 | 2 | 2 | 63 | 14 | +49 | 56 | Promotion to 2012–13 Bundesliga |
| 2 | 1899 Hoffenheim | 22 | 15 | 3 | 4 | 56 | 26 | +30 | 48 | |
| 3 | TSV Crailsheim | 22 | 9 | 6 | 7 | 42 | 32 | +10 | 33 | |
| 4 | 1. FC Köln | 22 | 10 | 3 | 9 | 36 | 28 | +8 | 33 | |
| 5 | FFC Frankfurt II | 22 | 9 | 6 | 7 | 38 | 37 | +1 | 33 | |
| 6 | 1. FFC 08 Niederkirchen | 22 | 10 | 3 | 9 | 43 | 44 | −1 | 33 | |
| 7 | Bad Neuenahr II | 22 | 9 | 3 | 10 | 27 | 32 | −5 | 30 | |
| 8 | 1. FC Saarbrücken | 22 | 8 | 5 | 9 | 37 | 34 | +3 | 29 | |
| 9 | Bayern Munich II | 22 | 8 | 4 | 10 | 41 | 36 | +5 | 28 | |
| 10 | ETSV Würzburg | 22 | 7 | 2 | 13 | 43 | 53 | −10 | 23 | |
| 11 | Borussia Mönchengladbach (R) | 22 | 6 | 5 | 11 | 28 | 39 | −11 | 23 | Relegation to 2012–13 Regionalliga |
| 12 | FV Löchgau (R) | 22 | 1 | 2 | 19 | 22 | 101 | −79 | 5 | Relegation to 2012–13 Regionalliga |

Updated to match(es) played on 28 May 2012. Source: kicker.de (in German)
Rules for classification: 1) points; 2) goal difference; 3) number of goals scored.
(C) Champions; (P) Promoted; (R) Relegated

== German clubs in Europe ==
=== UEFA Champions League ===
==== Play-off round ====
| Team 1 | Agg. | Team 2 | 1st leg | 2nd leg |
|---|---|---|---|---|
| Bayern Munich (Germany) | 3–0 | (Switzerland) Zürich | 2–0 | 1–0 |

==== Group stage ====
Key to colours in group tables
Group winners and runners-up advance to the round of 16
Third-placed teams enter the UEFA Europa League at the round of 32

===== Group A =====
| Pos | Team | Pld | W | D | L | GF | GA | GD | Pts | Qualification | BAY | NAP | MCI | VIL |
|---|---|---|---|---|---|---|---|---|---|---|---|---|---|---|
| 1 | (Germany) Bayern Munich | 6 | 4 | 1 | 1 | 11 | 6 | +5 | 13 | Advance to knockout phase | — | 3–2 | 2–0 | 3–1 |
| 2 | (Italy) Napoli | 6 | 3 | 2 | 1 | 10 | 6 | +4 | 11 | Advance to knockout phase | 1–1 | — | 2–1 | 2–0 |
| 3 | (England) Manchester City | 6 | 3 | 1 | 2 | 9 | 6 | +3 | 10 | Transfer to Europa League | 2–0 | 1–1 | — | 2–1 |
| 4 | (Spain) Villarreal | 6 | 0 | 0 | 6 | 2 | 14 | −12 | 0 | | 0–2 | 0–2 | 0–3 | — |

Source: Soccerway

===== Group E =====
| Pos | Team | Pld | W | D | L | GF | GA | GD | Pts | Qualification | CHE | LEV | VAL | GNK |
|---|---|---|---|---|---|---|---|---|---|---|---|---|---|---|
| 1 | (England) Chelsea | 6 | 3 | 2 | 1 | 13 | 4 | +9 | 11 | Advance to knockout phase | — | 2–0 | 3–0 | 5–0 |
| 2 | (Germany) Bayer Leverkusen | 6 | 3 | 1 | 2 | 8 | 8 | 0 | 10 | Advance to knockout phase | 2–1 | — | 2–1 | 2–0 |
| 3 | (Spain) Valencia | 6 | 2 | 2 | 2 | 12 | 7 | +5 | 8 | Transfer to Europa League | 1–1 | 3–1 | — | 7–0 |
| 4 | (Belgium) Genk | 6 | 0 | 3 | 3 | 2 | 16 | −14 | 3 | | 1–1 | 1–1 | 0–0 | — |

Source: Soccerway

===== Group F =====
| Pos | Team | Pld | W | D | L | GF | GA | GD | Pts | Qualification | ARS | MAR | OLY | DOR |
|---|---|---|---|---|---|---|---|---|---|---|---|---|---|---|
| 1 | (England) Arsenal | 6 | 3 | 2 | 1 | 7 | 6 | +1 | 11 | Advance to knockout phase | — | 0–0 | 2–1 | 2–1 |
| 2 | (France) Marseille | 6 | 3 | 1 | 2 | 7 | 4 | +3 | 10 | Advance to knockout phase | 0–1 | — | 0–1 | 3–0 |
| 3 | (Greece) Olympiacos | 6 | 3 | 0 | 3 | 8 | 6 | +2 | 9 | Transfer to Europa League | 3–1 | 0–1 | — | 3–1 |
| 4 | (Germany) Borussia Dortmund | 6 | 1 | 1 | 4 | 6 | 12 | −6 | 4 | | 1–1 | 2–3 | 1–0 | — |

Source: Soccerway

==== Knockout phase ====
===== Round of 16 =====
| Team 1 | Agg. | Team 2 | 1st leg | 2nd leg |
|---|---|---|---|---|
| Basel (Switzerland) | 1–7 | (Germany) Bayern Munich | 1–0 | 0–7 |
| Bayer Leverkusen (Germany) | 2–10 | (Spain) Barcelona | 1–3 | 1–7 |

===== Quarter-finals =====
| Team 1 | Agg. | Team 2 | 1st leg | 2nd leg |
|---|---|---|---|---|
| Marseille (France) | 0–4 | (Germany) Bayern Munich | 0–2 | 0–2 |

===== Semi-finals =====
| Team 1 | Agg. | Team 2 | 1st leg | 2nd leg |
|---|---|---|---|---|
| Bayern Munich (Germany) | 3–3 (3–1 p) | (Spain) Real Madrid | 2–1 | 1–2 (a.e.t.) |

===== Final =====
19 May 2012
20:45 CEST

| Bayern Munich (Germany) | 1–1 (a.e.t.) | (England) Chelsea |
|---|---|---|
| Müller 83' | Report | Drogba 88' |
Penalties
| Lahm (penalty scored); Gómez (penalty scored); Neuer (penalty scored); Olić (penalty missed); Schweinsteiger (penalty missed) | 3–4 | (penalty missed) Mata; (penalty scored) Luiz; (penalty scored) Lampard; (penalty scored) Cole; (penalty scored) Drogba |

Allianz Arena, Munich
Attendance: 62,500
Referee: Pedro Proença (Portugal)

=== UEFA Europa League ===
==== Qualifying phase ====
===== Third qualifying round =====
| Team 1 | Agg. | Team 2 | 1st leg | 2nd leg |
|---|---|---|---|---|
| Mainz 05 (Germany) | 2–2 (3–4 p) | (Romania) Gaz Metan Mediaș | 1–1 | 1–1 (a.e.t.) |

===== Play-off round =====
| Team 1 | Agg. | Team 2 | 1st leg | 2nd leg |
|---|---|---|---|---|
| Hannover 96 (Germany) | 3–2 | (Spain) Sevilla | 2–1 | 1–1 |
| HJK Helsinki (Finland) | 3–6 | (Germany) Schalke 04 | 2–0 | 1–6 |

==== Group stage ====
Key to colours in group tables
Group winners and runners-up advance to the round of 32

===== Group B =====
| Pos | Team | Pld | W | D | L | GF | GA | GD | Pts | Qualification | SL | HAN | COP | VP |
|---|---|---|---|---|---|---|---|---|---|---|---|---|---|---|
| 1 | (Belgium) Standard Liège | 6 | 4 | 2 | 0 | 9 | 1 | +8 | 14 | Advance to knockout phase | — | 2–0 | 3–0 | 0–0 |
| 2 | (Germany) Hannover 96 | 6 | 3 | 2 | 1 | 9 | 7 | +2 | 11 | Advance to knockout phase | 0–0 | — | 2–2 | 3–1 |
| 3 | (Denmark) Copenhagen | 6 | 1 | 2 | 3 | 5 | 9 | −4 | 5 | | 0–1 | 1–2 | — | 1–0 |
| 4 | (Ukraine) Vorskla Poltava | 6 | 0 | 2 | 4 | 4 | 10 | −6 | 2 | | 1–3 | 1–2 | 1–1 | — |

Source: Soccerway

===== Group J =====
| Pos | Team | Pld | W | D | L | GF | GA | GD | Pts | Qualification | SCH | SB | MHA | AEK |
|---|---|---|---|---|---|---|---|---|---|---|---|---|---|---|
| 1 | (Germany) Schalke 04 | 6 | 4 | 2 | 0 | 13 | 2 | +11 | 14 | Advance to knockout phase | — | 2–1 | 3–1 | 0–0 |
| 2 | (Romania) Steaua București | 6 | 2 | 2 | 2 | 9 | 11 | −2 | 8 | Advance to knockout phase | 0–0 | — | 4–2 | 3–1 |
| 3 | (Israel) Maccabi Haifa | 6 | 2 | 0 | 4 | 10 | 12 | −2 | 6 | | 0–3 | 5–0 | — | 1–0 |
| 4 | (Cyprus) AEK Larnaca | 6 | 1 | 2 | 3 | 4 | 11 | −7 | 5 | | 0–5 | 1–1 | 2–1 | — |

Source: Soccerway

==== Knockout phase ====
===== Round of 32 =====
| Team 1 | Agg. | Team 2 | 1st leg | 2nd leg |
|---|---|---|---|---|
| Viktoria Plzeň (Czech Republic) | 2–4 | (Germany) Schalke 04 | 1–1 | 1–3 (a.e.t.) |
| Hannover 96 (Germany) | 3–1 | (Belgium) Club Brugge | 2–1 | 1–0 |

===== Round of 16 =====
| Team 1 | Agg. | Team 2 | 1st leg | 2nd leg |
|---|---|---|---|---|
| Twente (Netherlands) | 2–4 | (Germany) Schalke 04 | 1–0 | 1–4 |
| Standard Liège (Belgium) | 2–6 | (Germany) Hannover 96 | 2–2 | 0–4 |

===== Quarter-finals =====
| Team 1 | Agg. | Team 2 | 1st leg | 2nd leg |
|---|---|---|---|---|
| Schalke 04 (Germany) | 4–6 | (Spain) Athletic Bilbao | 2–4 | 2–2 |
| Atlético Madrid (Spain) | 4–2 | (Germany) Hannover 96 | 2–1 | 2–1 |

=== UEFA Women's Champions League ===
==== Round of 32 ====
| Team 1 | Agg. | Team 2 | 1st leg | 2nd leg |
|---|---|---|---|---|
| Þór/KA (Iceland) | 2–14 | (Germany) Turbine Potsdam | 0–6 | 2–8 |
| Stabæk (Norway) | 2–4 | (Germany) Frankfurt | 1–0 | 1–4 |

==== Round of 16 ====
| Team 1 | Agg. | Team 2 | 1st leg | 2nd leg |
|---|---|---|---|---|
| Frankfurt (Germany) | 4–2 | (France) Paris Saint-Germain | 3–0 | 1–2 |
| Turbine Potsdam (Germany) | 17–0 | (Scotland) Glasgow City | 10–0 | 7–0 |

==== Quarter-finals ====
| Team 1 | Agg. | Team 2 | 1st leg | 2nd leg |
|---|---|---|---|---|
| LdB Malmö (Sweden) | 1–3 | (Germany) Frankfurt | 1–0 | 0–3 |
| Turbine Potsdam (Germany) | 5–0 | (Russia) Rossiyanka | 2–0 | 3–0 |

==== Semi-finals ====
| Team 1 | Agg. | Team 2 | 1st leg | 2nd leg |
|---|---|---|---|---|
| Lyon (France) | 5–1 | (Germany) Turbine Potsdam | 5–1 | 0–0 |
| Arsenal (England) | 1–4 | (Germany) Frankfurt | 1–2 | 0–2 |

==== Final ====
17 May 2012
18:00 CET

| Lyon (France) | 2–0 | (Germany) 1. FFC Frankfurt |
|---|---|---|
| Le Sommer 15' (pen.); Abily 28' | Report |

Olympiastadion, Munich
Attendance: 50,212
Referee: Jenny Palmqvist (Sweden)

== Retirements ==
- Tomasz Bobel – 36, Polish goalkeeper for Fortuna Köln, MSV Duisburg, Erzgebirge Aue, and Bayer 04 Leverkusen. Bobel began his career in Poland before joining Fortuna Köln. In 2009, he had a brief stint in Azerbaijan, playing for Neftchi Baku, before returning to Germany as a backup to René Adler.
- Pál Dárdai – 35, Hungarian midfielder for Hertha BSC. Beginning his career for in Hungary, Dardai played over a decade for Hertha BSC.
- Ivica Grlić – 35, Bosnian midfielder, for TSV 1860 München, Fortuna Köln, 1. FC Köln, Alemannia Aachen, and MSV Duisburg. Born in Munich, Grlić earned 26 international caps for Bosnia over the course of his career. He captained MSV Duisburg until 2008, when he missed several consecutive games due to injury.
- Mathias Hain – 38, German goalkeeper for SpVgg Greuther Fürth, Arminia Bielefeld, and FC St. Pauli. Long serving captain of Arminia Bielefeld, Hain was forced to retire after breaking his arm.
- Sami Hyypiä – 37, Finnish defender for Bayer 04 Leverkusen. Beginning his career in Finland for MYPA, Hyypiä played in the Netherlands for Willem II and in England for Liverpool before coming to Germany.
- Jean-Sébastien Jaurès – 33, French defender for Borussia Mönchengladbach. Before his three seasons in the Bundesliga, Jaurès had played his entire career for AJ Auxerre.
- Tomasz Kos – 37, Polish midfielder for FC Gütersloh, 1. FC Nürnberg, and FC Erzgebirge Aue. Kos captained Erzgebirge Aue, and earned three international caps over the course of his career.
- Martin Pieckenhagen – 39, German goalkeeper for 1. FC Union Berlin, Tennis Borussia Berlin, MSV Duisburg, Hansa Rostock, Hamburger SV, and 1. FSV Mainz 05. In addition to the German clubs, he played five season in the Netherlands for Heracles Almelo.

== Deaths ==
- 13 December 2011 – Klaus-Dieter Sieloff, 69, defender for VfB Stuttgart and Borussia Mönchengladbach, among others. Member of 1966 and 1970 West Germany world cup squads.
- 3 January 2012 – Willi Entenmann, 68, player for VfB Stuttgart and others. He also was manager for Stuttgart and 1. FC Nürnberg among others.
- 1 March 2012 – Henryk Bałuszyński, 39, striker for VfL Bochum and Arminia Bielefeld, among others. From 1994 to 1997, he earned 15 international caps for the Polish national team.
- 12 March 2012 – Friedhelm Konietzka, 73, striker for Borussia Dortmund and TSV 1860 München. Following his career as a player, Konietzka managed Borussia Dortmund, Bayer Uerdingen, Hessen Kassel, and several Swiss clubs, winning the Swiss championship three times.
- 12 April 2012 – Manfred Orzessek, 78, goalkeeper for FC Schalke 04 and Borussia Mönchengladbach. Orzessek won the German championship with Schalke in 1958, and was the starting goalkeeper of the Mönchengladbach side that won promotion to the Bundesliga in 1965.
