= 2012 UEFA Champions League final =

Football match in Munich, Germany

- Match programme cover
- Event: 2011–12 UEFA Champions League
Bayern Munich	Chelsea
(Germany)	(England)
1	1
- After extra time Chelsea won 4–3 on penalties
- Date: 19 May 2012
- Venue: Allianz Arena, Munich
- UEFA Man of the Match: Didier Drogba (Chelsea)
- Fans' Man of the Match: Petr Čech (Chelsea)
- Referee: Pedro Proença (Portugal)
- Attendance: 62,500
- Weather: Partly cloudy 20 °C (68 °F); 38% humidity

The 2012 UEFA Champions League final was an association football match which took place on Saturday, 19 May 2012 between Bayern Munich of Germany and Chelsea of England at the Allianz Arena in Munich, Germany. The match was to decide the winner of the 2011–12 season of the UEFA Champions League, Europe's premier club football tournament. Bayern were making their ninth appearance in the competition's final, having won four and lost four, most recently losing in 2010. Chelsea were appearing in their second final, having lost their first in 2008.

It was the first Champions League final to be held at the Allianz Arena (known as Fußball Arena München for the final). As tenants of the Arena, this meant Bayern were the first finalists to have home advantage since 1984. Both teams progressed to the knockout stages by finishing top of their group. Bayern then beat Basel, Marseille and Real Madrid to reach the final, while Chelsea knocked out Napoli, Benfica and defending champions Barcelona.

Bayern took the lead late in the second half through Thomas Müller, but Didier Drogba equalised for Chelsea five minutes later to take the game to extra time, in which Arjen Robben missed an awarded penalty, Petr Čech saving the low drive. The teams stayed level at 1–1 and the match went to a penalty shoot-out, which Chelsea won 4–3 to clinch their first Champions League title. In doing so, they became the first London club to win the tournament, the fifth English club and 22nd overall.

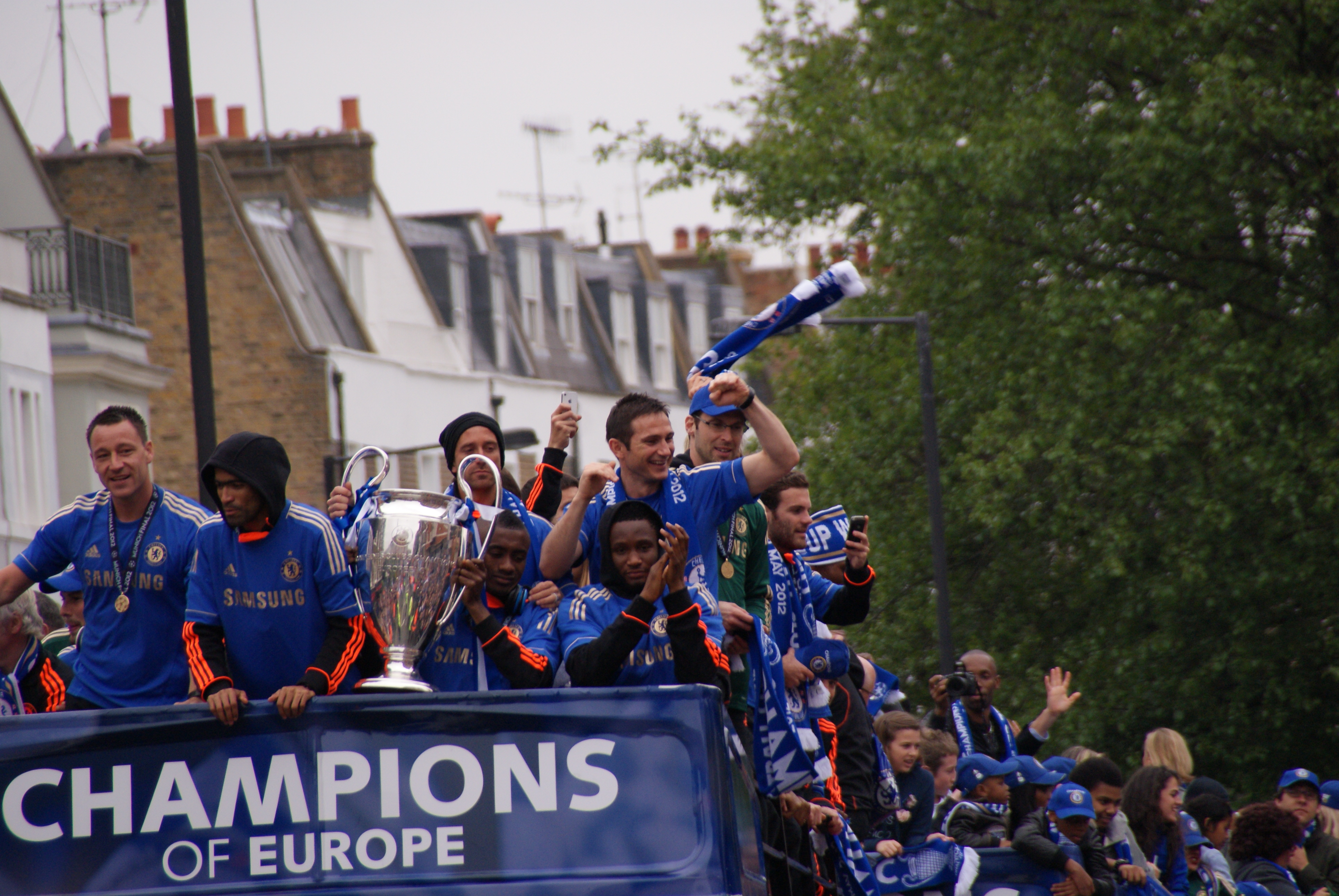
Chelsea held a triumphant open-top bus parade through west London on May 20, 2012, celebrating their 4-3 penalty win over Bayern Munich.

As winners, Chelsea took part in the 2012 UEFA Super Cup, losing 4–1 to Atlético Madrid, the winners of the 2011–12 UEFA Europa League. The victory also allowed them to enter the following season's Champions League competition (having failed to qualify for it by their league finishing position) at the expense of London rivals Tottenham Hotspur, who would otherwise have entered the competition having finished fourth in the Premier League. Chelsea also represented UEFA at the 2012 FIFA Club World Cup, entering at the semi-final stage; however, they were beaten 1–0 by Corinthians in the final.

== Venue ==
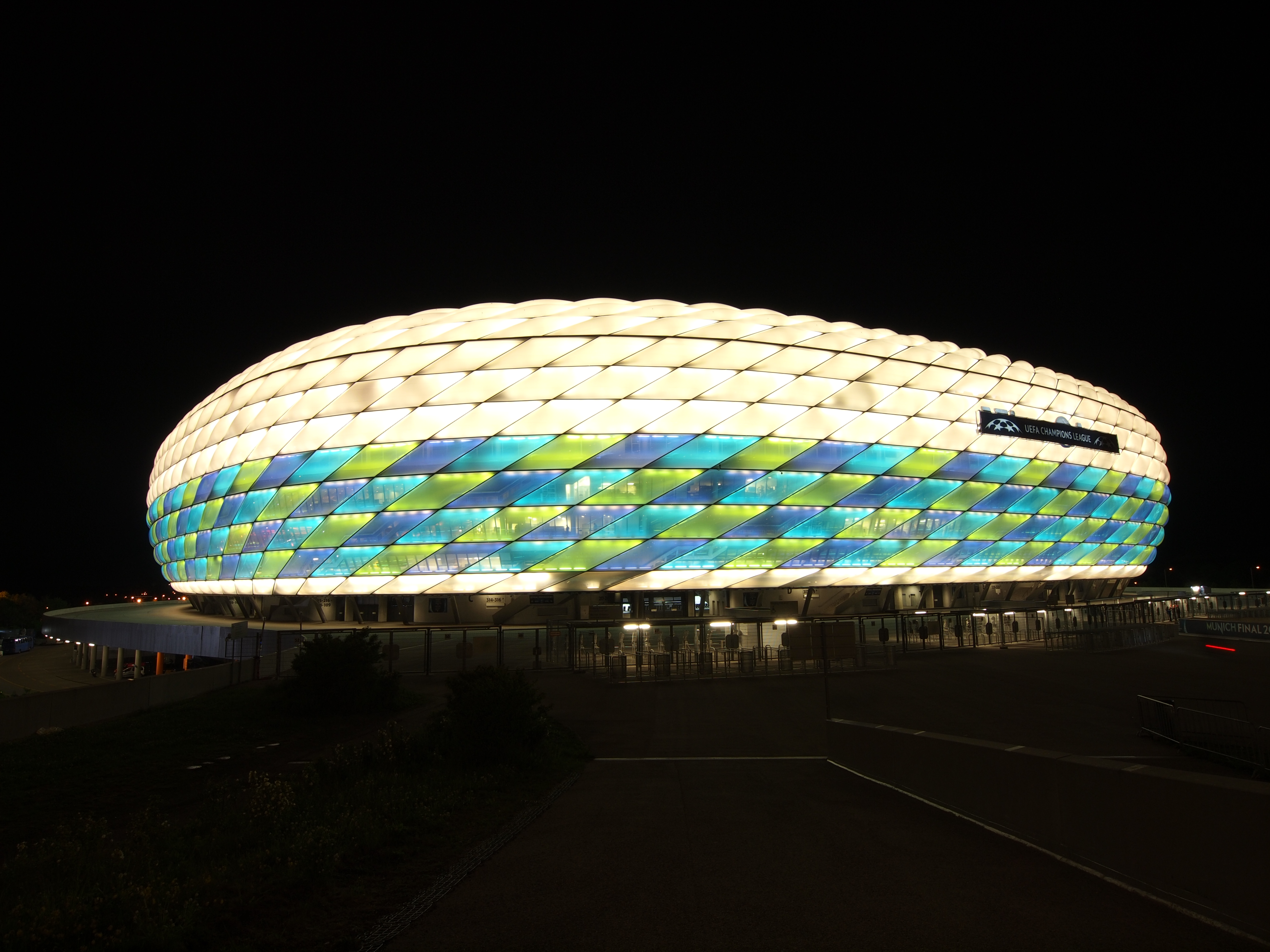
The Allianz Arena in Champions League final livery

The Allianz Arena was announced by UEFA as the venue of the 2012 final on 30 January 2010, although the stadium was referred to as "Fußball Arena München" for the match, as UEFA does not recognise sponsorship by companies that are not among its partner organisations. The stadium, which opened in 2005, was then the home stadium of both Bayern Munich and 1860 Munich, and was used for six matches at the 2006 FIFA World Cup including the opening match.

The stadium was hosting its first major European final. The Olympiastadion in Munich, the previous home of Bayern Munich and 1860 Munich, hosted three European Cup finals; in 1979, 1993 and 1997. On each previous occasion, a European Cup final held in Munich had produced a first-time winner of the competition (Nottingham Forest, Olympique Marseille and Borussia Dortmund).

During the match, the stadium was illuminated in green and turquoise to represent the official UEFA emblem of the Munich final, as the outer shell of the Allianz Arena can change colour.

== Background ==
To reach the final, in the knockout phase Bayern defeated Basel, Marseille, and Real Madrid (3–1 on penalties after a 3–3 aggregate score), while Chelsea overcame Napoli, Benfica, and the defending champions Barcelona (3–2 on aggregate).

Both teams reached the final having already lost out in their domestic leagues (the Bundesliga and Premier League respectively), but having also reached the final of their domestic cup competitions (the DFB-Pokal and FA Cup respectively), to be played prior to the Champions League final. Chelsea won the FA Cup by defeating Liverpool 2–1 thus were chasing a double, while Bayern lost the Final of the DFB-Pokal 5–2 to Borussia Dortmund.

Both clubs had lost their most recent Champions League final – Bayern in 2010 to Inter Milan 2–0 and Chelsea in 2008 in an all-English clash with Manchester United on penalties after a 1–1 draw. While that was Chelsea's only Champions League final, Bayern had previously played in eight Champions League/European Cup finals, winning four (1974, 1975, 1976, 2001) and losing four (1982, 1987, 1999 and 2010). The clubs had only met each other once in Europe before, with Chelsea winning 6–5 on aggregate in the quarter-finals of the 2004–05 UEFA Champions League.

The match was the fourth occasion that a team had reached a final of the European Cup which was scheduled to be played at their own home ground, after 1957, 1965 and 1984, and the first occasion since the tournament was rebranded to the UEFA Champions League. For this reason, fans of Bayern Munich called the match "Finale dahoam" (Bavarian for "final at home"). This was the first time since 2007 that neither of the participants were current champions of their domestic league. This was the sixth time that an English side and a German side had met in a European Cup/Champions League final; the other occasions were 1975, 1977, 1980, 1982 and 1999. It was also Bayern's fourth time facing an English side in the European Cup/Champions League final, having won in 1975 vs. Leeds United and lost in 1982 vs. Aston Villa and 1999 to Manchester United.

== Route to the final ==
Note: In all results below, the score of the finalist is given first (H: home; A: away).

(Germany) Bayern Munich				Round	(England) Chelsea			
Opponent	Agg.	1st leg	2nd leg	Qualifying phase	Opponent	Agg.	1st leg	2nd leg
(Switzerland) Zürich	3–0	2–0 (H)	1–0 (A)	Play-off round	Bye			
Opponent	Result			Group stage	Opponent	Result		
(Spain) Villarreal	2–0 (A)			Matchday 1	(Germany) Bayer Leverkusen	2–0 (H)		
(England) Manchester City	2–0 (H)			Matchday 2	(Spain) Valencia	1–1 (A)		
(Italy) Napoli	1–1 (A)			Matchday 3	(Belgium) Genk	5–0 (H)		
(Italy) Napoli	3–2 (H)			Matchday 4	(Belgium) Genk	1–1 (A)		
(Spain) Villarreal	3–1 (H)			Matchday 5	(Germany) Bayer Leverkusen	1–2 (A)		
(England) Manchester City	0–2 (A)			Matchday 6	(Spain) Valencia	3–0 (H)		
Group A winners: Pos / Team / Pld / Pts; 1 / (Germany) Bayern Munich / 6 / 13; 2 / (Italy) Napoli / 6 / 11; 3 / (England) Manchester City / 6 / 10; 4 / (Spain) Villarreal / 6 / 0; Source: Soccerway				Final standings	Group E winners: Pos / Team / Pld / Pts; 1 / (England) Chelsea / 6 / 11; 2 / (Germany) Bayer Leverkusen / 6 / 10; 3 / (Spain) Valencia / 6 / 8; 4 / (Belgium) Genk / 6 / 3; Source: Soccerway			
Opponent	Agg.	1st leg	2nd leg	Knockout phase	Opponent	Agg.	1st leg	2nd leg
(Switzerland) Basel	7–1	0–1 (A)	7–0 (H)	Round of 16	(Italy) Napoli	5–4	1–3 (A)	4–1 (a.e.t.) (H)
(France) Marseille	4–0	2–0 (A)	2–0 (H)	Quarter-finals	(Portugal) Benfica	3–1	1–0 (A)	2–1 (H)
(Spain) Real Madrid	3–3 (3–1 p)	2–1 (H)	1–2 (a.e.t.) (A)	Semi-finals	(Spain) Barcelona	3–2	1–0 (H)	2–2 (A)

== Pre-match ==
=== Ticketing ===
The two teams each received 17,500 tickets to distribute to their supporters. A further 7,000 tickets were available for sale to fans worldwide via UEFA.com, with prices between €70 and €370. The remaining tickets were allocated to the local organising committee, UEFA's 53 national football associations, and commercial and broadcast partners.

=== Ambassador ===
Former German player Paul Breitner was named as the ambassador for the final.

=== Officials ===
In May 2012, Pedro Proença, the Portuguese referee was selected to oversee the final. Joining him, was fellow Portuguese officials Bertino Miranda and Ricardo Santos as assistant referees, Jorge Sousa and Duarte Gomes as additional assistant referees, Tiago Trigo as reserve assistant referee, and Spaniard Carlos Velasco Carballo as fourth official.

=== Team selection ===
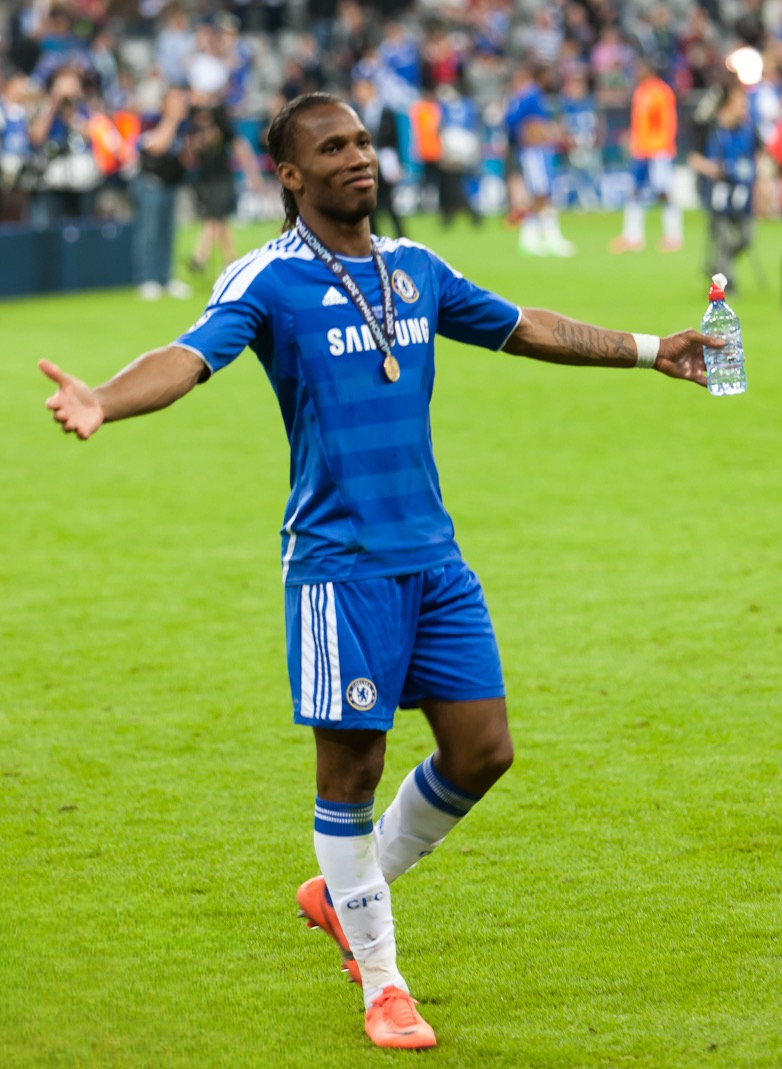
Didier Drogba scored the equalising goal and the winning penalty.

Both clubs had players missing due to suspensions; Bayern were missing David Alaba, Holger Badstuber and Luiz Gustavo, while Chelsea were without Branislav Ivanović, Raul Meireles, Ramires and John Terry. Terry was suspended after being sent off in the semi-final, which automatically excludes a player from the final. The other six all received yellow cards in the semi-finals, which took them over the limit of a third yellow card of the competition, which triggers an automatic suspension from the next match. Players union FIFPro appealed to UEFA to allow the players with yellow cards to play, seeing the punishment of "missing the match of your life" as too harsh; UEFA rejected the appeal and stated the rule would not be reviewed for at least three years. Ivanović stated how he "had no idea [he] was one booking away from missing the Champions League final." UEFA confirmed that Chelsea captain Terry would be allowed to lift the trophy should Chelsea win, despite his suspension. Ryan Bertrand also got his initial first-team start as a left winger ahead of his regular left back position.

Only two of the 36 players had previously been in a winning squad in a Champions League final: Chelsea's Paulo Ferreira and José Bosingwa were in the Porto squad in 2004. Ten of the Bayern 18 had earlier been in their squad that lost the 2010 final, although only four started both games: Philipp Lahm, Bastian Schweinsteiger, Arjen Robben and Thomas Müller. Eight of the Chelsea squad had been in their losing 2008 squad, including four who started both games: Petr Čech, Ashley Cole, Frank Lampard and Didier Drogba.

=== Opening ceremony ===
The UEFA Champions League Anthem was performed by German tenor Jonas Kaufmann and violinist David Garrett.

=== Related events ===
The UEFA Champions Festival was held at Munich's Olympiapark from 16 to 19 May. An official public screening of the final took place at the Olympiastadion during the match, with capacity for 65,000 fans, including a section for Chelsea supporters. A second public screening was planned on the Theresienwiese, where the famous Oktoberfest takes place.

== Match ==
=== Summary ===
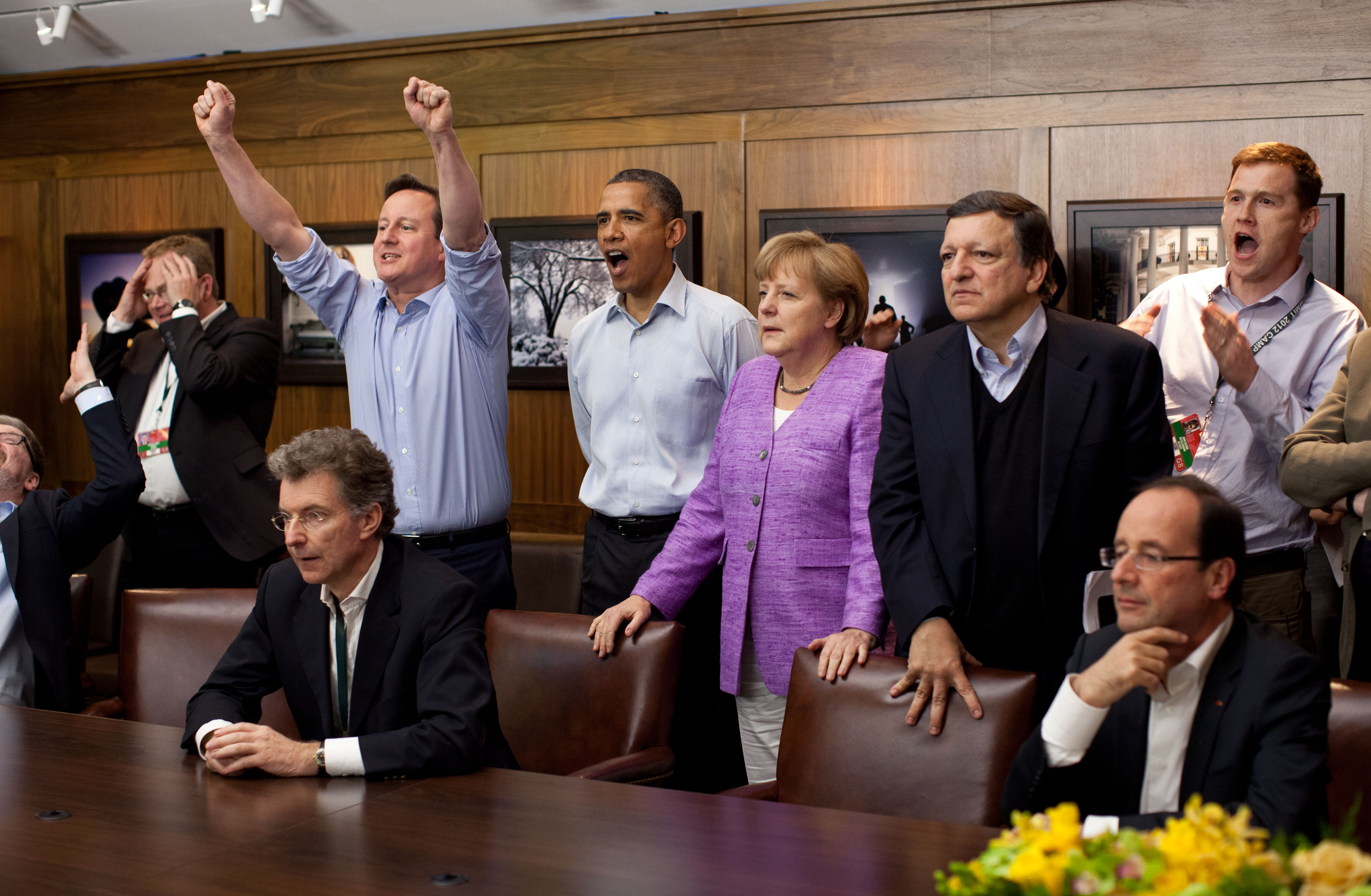
British Prime Minister David Cameron and German Chancellor Angela Merkel watching the penalty shoot-out with US President Barack Obama, French President François Hollande, European Commission President José Manuel Barroso and others during the G8 summit.

Bayern had control for most of the match, with former Chelsea winger Robben having the best chance, which Čech deflected onto the frame of the goal with his legs. Chelsea, however, also had chances, with Salomon Kalou nearly finishing at the near post. Bayern kept pushing Chelsea to the limit but missed sitters from Mario Gómez, who sent his shot over the bar; and Robben, who was blocked at the last second by Gary Cahill. Bayern took the lead in the 83rd minute, when Toni Kroos crossed in to Müller, who headed the ball down into the ground, causing it to bounce over Čech and in off the crossbar. Bayern took Müller off and replaced him with Daniel Van Buyten in an attempt to strengthen the defence. However, on 88 minutes, Chelsea won their first corner kick of the match, and when Juan Mata swung it in, Drogba got to it first and powered a header past Manuel Neuer at the near post for the equaliser. Chelsea won a free kick just outside the area in the 93rd minute, but Drogba smashed it over.

The game went to extra time, and Bayern had the first good chance of the extra 30 minutes when Ivica Olić inside the box passed to Gómez, but his shot was wide. Later, Drogba fouled Franck Ribéry in the penalty area, injuring him and earning Bayern a penalty; Robben took it, but his shot was saved by Čech. In the second half of extra time, Olić attempted to set up Van Buyten instead of taking a shot and the ball rolled wide of Čech's far post.

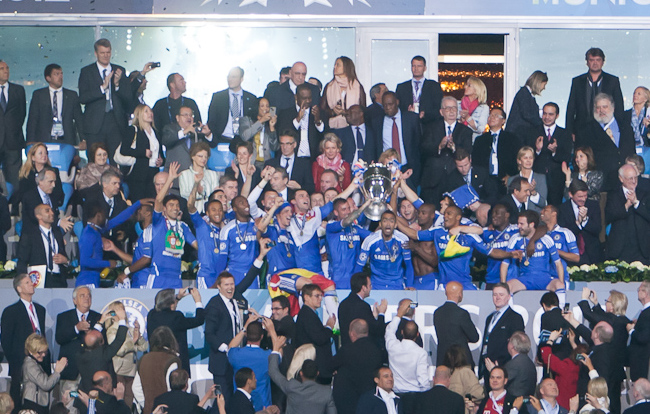
Chelsea received the trophy from UEFA President Michel Platini.

For the first time since 2008, when Chelsea had lost to Manchester United, the European Cup would be decided by penalties. Lahm went first and scored to Čech's left, as Čech got his fingertips to the ball but was unable to keep it out. Mata took Chelsea's first penalty, but his weak shot was saved by Neuer. Next was Gómez, who drilled his shot into the bottom-right corner. David Luiz took Chelsea's second penalty and scored with a powerful shot into the top corner after a long run up. Goalkeeper Neuer took Bayern's third penalty, and Čech went the right way again but was unable to keep his opposite number's low shot from creeping past him into the bottom-left corner. Lampard was next and he scored with a hard shot high and down the middle. Olić was next and taking his final competitive kick for Bayern, but Čech saved to his left. Cole then slotted his kick into the bottom-right corner just out of Neuer's reach to level the scores at 3–3 and hasten sudden death. Schweinsteiger, who had scored Bayern's decisive fifth penalty against Real Madrid's Iker Casillas in the semi-finals, was their fifth penalty taker again. However, Čech tipped his effort onto the post, having gone the correct direction for every Bayern penalty, to leave Chelsea one kick away from winning the trophy. In 2008, Drogba had missed out on taking Chelsea's fifth penalty against Manchester United, having been sent off in extra time; now in the same position, the Ivorian sent Neuer the wrong way and put his kick into the bottom-left corner to win it for Chelsea. It proved to be his final kick as a Chelsea player until his return in 2014.

The victory marked not only Chelsea's first ever European Cup, but also the first time a London team had won the competition – previously, aside from Chelsea's 2008 defeat to United, which was the last time an English club had won the competition until Liverpool’s triumph in the final against Tottenham in Madrid, 7 years later. Arsenal had also lost the 2006 final in Paris against Barcelona.

=== Details ===
19 May 2012
20:45 UTC+2

Bayern Munich (Germany)	1–1 (a.e.t.)	(England) Chelsea
Müller 83'	Report	Drogba 88'
Penalties
Lahm (penalty scored); Gómez (penalty scored); Neuer (penalty scored); Olić (penalty missed); Schweinsteiger (penalty missed)	3–4	(penalty missed) Mata; (penalty scored) David Luiz; (penalty scored) Lampard; (penalty scored) Cole; (penalty scored) Drogba

Allianz Arena, Munich
Attendance: 62,500
Referee: Pedro Proença (Portugal)

Bayern Munich	Chelsea

GK	1	(Germany) Manuel Neuer
RB	21	(Germany) Philipp Lahm (c)
CB	17	(Germany) Jérôme Boateng
CB	44	(Ukraine) Anatoliy Tymoshchuk
LB	26	(Germany) Diego Contento
DM	31	(Germany) Bastian Schweinsteiger	(yellow card) 2'
DM	39	(Germany) Toni Kroos
RW	10	(Netherlands) Arjen Robben
AM	25	(Germany) Thomas Müller		(substituted off) 87'
LW	7	(France) Franck Ribéry		(substituted off) 97'
CF	33	(Germany) Mario Gómez
Substitutes:
GK	22	(Germany) Hans-Jörg Butt
DF	5	(Belgium) Daniel Van Buyten		(substituted on) 87'
DF	13	(Brazil) Rafinha
MF	14	(Japan) Takashi Usami
MF	23	(Croatia) Danijel Pranjić
FW	9	(Germany) Nils Petersen
FW	11	(Croatia) Ivica Olić		(substituted on) 97'
Manager:
(Germany) Jupp Heynckes

GK	1	(Czech Republic) Petr Čech
RB	17	(Portugal) José Bosingwa
CB	4	(Brazil) David Luiz	(yellow card) 86'
CB	24	(England) Gary Cahill
LB	3	(England) Ashley Cole	(yellow card) 81'
DM	12	(Nigeria) Mikel John Obi
CM	8	(England) Frank Lampard (c)
RW	21	(Ivory Coast) Salomon Kalou		(substituted off) 84'
AM	10	(Spain) Juan Mata
LW	34	(England) Ryan Bertrand		(substituted off) 73'
CF	11	(Ivory Coast) Didier Drogba	(yellow card) 93'
Substitutes:
GK	22	(England) Ross Turnbull
DF	19	(Portugal) Paulo Ferreira
MF	5	(Ghana) Michael Essien
MF	6	(Spain) Oriol Romeu
MF	15	(France) Florent Malouda		(substituted on) 73'
FW	9	(Spain) Fernando Torres	(yellow card) 120'	(substituted on) 84'
FW	23	(England) Daniel Sturridge
Manager:
(Italy) Roberto Di Matteo

UEFA Man of the Match:
Didier Drogba (Chelsea)
Fans' Man of the Match:
Petr Čech (Chelsea)

Assistant referees:
Bertino Miranda (Portugal)
Ricardo Santos (Portugal)
Fourth official:
Carlos Velasco Carballo (Spain)
Additional assistant referees:
Jorge Sousa (Portugal)
Duarte Gomes (Portugal)
Reserve assistant referee:
Tiago Trigo (Portugal)

Match rules

- 90 minutes.
- 30 minutes of extra time if necessary.
- Penalty shoot-out if scores still level.
- Seven named substitutes.
- Maximum of three substitutions.

=== Statistics ===
First half
Statistic	Bayern Munich	Chelsea
Goals scored	0	0
Total shots	16	2
Shots on target	2	1
Saves	1	2
Ball possession	61%	39%
Corner kicks	8	0
Fouls committed	4	9
Offsides	0	1
Yellow cards	1	0
Red cards	0	0

Second half
Statistic	Bayern Munich	Chelsea
Goals scored	1	1
Total shots	19	4
Shots on target	5	2
Saves	1	3
Ball possession	52%	48%
Corner kicks	9	1
Fouls committed	6	9
Offsides	1	0
Yellow cards	0	2
Red cards	0	0

Extra time
Statistic	Bayern Munich	Chelsea
Goals scored	0	0
Total shots	8	2
Shots on target	1	0
Saves	0	1
Ball possession	59%	41%
Corner kicks	3	0
Fouls committed	4	8
Offsides	0	1
Yellow cards	0	2
Red cards	0	0

Overall
Statistic	Bayern Munich	Chelsea
Goals scored	1	1
Total shots	43	9
Shots on target	7	3
Saves	2	6
Ball possession	56%	44%
Corner kicks	20	1
Fouls committed	14	26
Offsides	1	2
Yellow cards	1	4
Red cards	0	0

== Legends of Europe reunion match ==
On 9 September 2023, the two clubs played a legends match at Stamford Bridge to benefit The Chelsea Foundation and The Royal Marsden Cancer Charity. The match was also in memory of former Chelsea and Italy player Gianluca Vialli, who had died at the Royal Marsden Hospital on 6 January of pancreatic cancer at the age of 58.

Chelsea included most of their team from the 2012 final and also included captain Terry and Ramires, who had both missed the final due to suspension, and Michael Essien, who was an unused substitute in 2012. Gianfranco Zola, Jody Morris and Salomon Kalou were among the players who returned, and Di Matteo also returned to manage the side. Bayern Munich included only Van Buyten from their 2012 team but included a number of their players from their 2001 team that had beaten Valencia in Milan, including Owen Hargreaves, Giovane Elber and Thomas Linke. 2001 captain Stefan Effenberg also co-managed alongside Raimond Aumann. Chelsea won 4–0 with goals from Essien, Terry, Cahill and Tiago Mendes.

== See also ==
- 2012 UEFA Women's Champions League final
- 2012 UEFA Europa League final
- 2011–12 Chelsea F.C. season
- 2011–12 FC Bayern Munich season
- 2013 UEFA Super Cup – contested by same teams
- Chelsea F.C. in international football
- FC Bayern Munich in international football
