= 2011–12 UEFA Champions League knockout phase =

The knockout phase of the 2011–12 UEFA Champions League began on 14 February with the round of 16, and concluded on 19 May 2012 with the final at Allianz Arena in Munich, Germany.

Times are CET/CEST, (Note: CET (UTC+1) for matches to 14 March 2012, and CEST (UTC+2) for matches from 27 March 2012.) as listed by UEFA (local times, if different, are in parentheses).

== Round and draw dates ==
All draws were held at UEFA headquarters in Nyon, Switzerland.

| Round | Draw date and time | First leg | Second leg |
|---|---|---|---|
| Round of 16 | 16 December 2011 12:00 | 14–15 & 21–22 February 2012 | 6–7 & 13–14 March 2012 |
| Quarter-finals | 16 March 2012 11:45 | 27–28 March 2012 | 3–4 April 2012 |
| Semi-finals | 16 March 2012 11:45 | 17–18 April 2012 | 24–25 April 2012 |
| Final | 16 March 2012 11:45 | 19 May 2012 at Allianz Arena, Munich | |

== Format ==
The knockout phase involved the sixteen teams who finished in the top two in each of their groups in the group stage.

Each tie in the knockout phase, apart from the final, was played over two legs, with each team playing one leg at home. The team that had the higher aggregate score over the two legs progressed to the next round. In the event that aggregate scores finished level, the away goals rule was applied, i.e. the team that scored more goals away from home over the two legs progressed. If away goals were also equal, then thirty minutes of extra time were played, divided into two fifteen-minutes halves. The away goals rule was again applied after extra time, i.e. if there were goals scored during extra time and the aggregate score was still level, the visiting team qualified by virtue of more away goals scored. If no goals were scored during extra time, the tie was decided by a penalty shoot-out. In the final, the tie was played as a single match. If scores were level at the end of normal time in the final, extra time was played, followed by penalties if scores remained tied.

The draw mechanisms for the knockout stage is as follows:

- In the draw for the round of 16, the eight group winners were seeded, and the eight group runners-up were unseeded. A seeded team was drawn against an unseeded team, with the seeded team hosting the second leg. Teams from the same group or the same association cannot be drawn against each other.
- In the draws for the quarter-finals onwards, there were no seedings, and teams from the same group or the same association could be drawn with each other.

== Qualified teams ==
Key to colours
Seeded in round of 16 draw
Unseeded in round of 16 draw

| Group | Winners | Runners-up |
|---|---|---|
| A | (Germany) Bayern Munich | (Italy) Napoli |
| B | (Italy) Internazionale | (Russia) CSKA Moscow |
| C | (Portugal) Benfica | (Switzerland) Basel |
| D | (Spain) Real Madrid | (France) Lyon |
| E | (England) Chelsea | (Germany) Bayer Leverkusen |
| F | (England) Arsenal | (France) Marseille |
| G | (Cyprus) APOEL | (Russia) Zenit Saint Petersburg |
| H | (Spain) Barcelona | (Italy) Milan |

== Bracket ==
Round of 16
(France) Marseille (a) | 1 | 1 | 2
(Italy) Internazionale | 0 | 2 | 2
(Switzerland) Basel | 1 | 0 | 1
(Germany) Bayern Munich | 0 | 7 | 7
(France) Lyon | 1 | 0 | 1 (3)
(Cyprus) APOEL (p) | 0 | 1 | 1 (4)
(Russia) CSKA Moscow | 1 | 1 | 2
(Spain) Real Madrid | 1 | 4 | 5
(Russia) Zenit Saint Petersburg | 3 | 0 | 3
(Portugal) Benfica | 2 | 2 | 4
(Italy) Napoli | 3 | 1 | 4
(England) Chelsea (a.e.t.) | 1 | 4 | 5
(Italy) Milan | 4 | 0 | 4
(England) Arsenal | 0 | 3 | 3
(Germany) Bayer Leverkusen | 1 | 1 | 2
(Spain) Barcelona | 3 | 7 | 10

Quarter-finals
(France) Marseille | 0 | 0 | 0
(Germany) Bayern Munich | 2 | 2 | 4
(Cyprus) APOEL | 0 | 2 | 2
(Spain) Real Madrid | 3 | 5 | 8
(Portugal) Benfica | 0 | 1 | 1
(England) Chelsea | 1 | 2 | 3
(Italy) Milan | 0 | 1 | 1
(Spain) Barcelona | 0 | 3 | 3

Semi-finals
(Germany) Bayern Munich (p) | 2 | 1 | 3 (3)
(Spain) Real Madrid | 1 | 2 | 3 (1)
(England) Chelsea | 1 | 2 | 3
(Spain) Barcelona | 0 | 2 | 2

Final
19 May – Munich
(Germany) Bayern Munich | 1 (3)
(England) Chelsea (p) | 1 (4)

== Round of 16 ==
=== Summary ===
The draw for the round of 16 was held on 16 December 2011. The first legs were played on 14, 15, 21 and 22 February, and the second legs were played on 6, 7, 13 and 14 March 2012.

| Team 1 | Agg. | Team 2 | 1st leg | 2nd leg |
|---|---|---|---|---|
| Lyon (France) | 1–1 (3–4 p) | (Cyprus) APOEL | 1–0 | 0–1 (a.e.t.) |
| Napoli (Italy) | 4–5 | (England) Chelsea | 3–1 | 1–4 (a.e.t.) |
| Milan (Italy) | 4–3 | (England) Arsenal | 4–0 | 0–3 |
| Basel (Switzerland) | 1–7 | (Germany) Bayern Munich | 1–0 | 0–7 |
| Bayer Leverkusen (Germany) | 2–10 | (Spain) Barcelona | 1–3 | 1–7 |
| CSKA Moscow (Russia) | 2–5 | (Spain) Real Madrid | 1–1 | 1–4 |
| Zenit Saint Petersburg (Russia) | 3–4 | (Portugal) Benfica | 3–2 | 0–2 |
| Marseille (France) | 2–2 (a) | (Italy) Internazionale | 1–0 | 1–2 |

=== Matches ===
14 February 2012
20:45

| Lyon (France) | 1–0 | (Cyprus) APOEL |
|---|---|---|
| Lacazette 58' | Report |

Stade de Gerland, Lyon
Attendance: 32,010
Referee: Paolo Tagliavento (Italy)
7 March 2012
20:45 (21:45 UTC+2)

| APOEL (Cyprus) | 1–0 (a.e.t.) | (France) Lyon |
|---|---|---|
| Manduca 9' | Report |
Penalties
| Aílton (penalty scored); Morais (penalty scored); Alexandrou (penalty scored); Tričkovski (penalty scored) | 4–3 | (penalty scored) Källström; (penalty scored) Lisandro; (penalty scored) Gomis; (penalty missed) Lacazette; (penalty missed) Bastos |

GSP Stadium, Nicosia
Attendance: 22,701
Referee: Alberto Undiano Mallenco (Spain)

1–1 on aggregate; APOEL won 4–3 on penalties.

21 February 2012
20:45

| Napoli (Italy) | 3–1 | (England) Chelsea |
|---|---|---|
| Lavezzi 38', 65'; Cavani 45+2' | Report | Mata 27' |

Stadio San Paolo, Naples
Attendance: 52,495
Referee: Carlos Velasco Carballo (Spain)
14 March 2012
20:45 (19:45 UTC+0)

| Chelsea (England) | 4–1 (a.e.t.) | (Italy) Napoli |
|---|---|---|
| Drogba 28'; Terry 47'; Lampard 75' (pen.); Ivanović 105' | Report | Inler 55' |

Stamford Bridge, London
Attendance: 37,784
Referee: Felix Brych (Germany)

Chelsea won 5–4 on aggregate.

15 February 2012
20:45

| Milan (Italy) | 4–0 | (England) Arsenal |
|---|---|---|
| Boateng 15'; Robinho 38', 49'; Ibrahimović 79' (pen.) | Report |

San Siro, Milan
Attendance: 64,462
Referee: Viktor Kassai (Hungary)
6 March 2012
20:45 (19:45 UTC+0)

| Arsenal (England) | 3–0 | (Italy) Milan |
|---|---|---|
| Koscielny 7'; Rosický 26'; Van Persie 43' (pen.) | Report |

Emirates Stadium, London
Attendance: 59,973
Referee: Damir Skomina (Slovenia)

Milan won 4–3 on aggregate.

22 February 2012
20:45

| Basel (Switzerland) | 1–0 | (Germany) Bayern Munich |
|---|---|---|
| Stocker 87' | Report |

St. Jakob-Park, Basel
Attendance: 36,000
Referee: Nicola Rizzoli (Italy)
13 March 2012
20:45

| Bayern Munich (Germany) | 7–0 | (Switzerland) Basel |
|---|---|---|
| Robben 11', 81'; Müller 42'; Gómez 44', 50', 61', 67' | Report |

Allianz Arena, Munich
Attendance: 66,000
Referee: Mark Clattenburg (England)

Bayern Munich won 7–1 on aggregate.

14 February 2012
20:45

| Bayer Leverkusen (Germany) | 1–3 | (Spain) Barcelona |
|---|---|---|
| Kadlec 52' | Report | Sánchez 41', 55'; Messi 88' |

BayArena, Leverkusen
Attendance: 29,400
Referee: Craig Thomson (Scotland)
7 March 2012
20:45

| Barcelona (Spain) | 7–1 | (Germany) Bayer Leverkusen |
|---|---|---|
| Messi 25', 42', 49', 58', 84'; Tello 55', 62' | Report | Bellarabi 90' |

Camp Nou, Barcelona
Attendance: 75,632
Referee: Svein Oddvar Moen (Norway)

Barcelona won 10–2 on aggregate.

21 February 2012
18:00 (21:00 UTC+4)

| CSKA Moscow (Russia) | 1–1 | (Spain) Real Madrid |
|---|---|---|
| Wernbloom 90+3' | Report | Ronaldo 28' |

Luzhniki Stadium, Moscow
Attendance: 70,000
Referee: Björn Kuipers (Netherlands)
14 March 2012
20:45

| Real Madrid (Spain) | 4–1 | (Russia) CSKA Moscow |
|---|---|---|
| Higuaín 26'; Ronaldo 55', 90+4'; Benzema 70' | Report | Tošić 77' |

Santiago Bernabéu, Madrid
Attendance: 67,743
Referee: Stéphane Lannoy (France)

Real Madrid won 5–2 on aggregate.

15 February 2012
18:00 (21:00 UTC+4)

| Zenit Saint Petersburg (Russia) | 3–2 | (Portugal) Benfica |
|---|---|---|
| Shirokov 27', 88'; Semak 71' | Report | Pereira 21'; Cardozo 87' |

Petrovsky Stadium, Saint Petersburg
Attendance: 18,200
Referee: Jonas Eriksson (Sweden)
6 March 2012
20:45 (19:45 UTC+0)

| Benfica (Portugal) | 2–0 | (Russia) Zenit Saint Petersburg |
|---|---|---|
| Pereira 45+1'; Oliveira 90+3' | Report |

Estádio da Luz, Lisbon
Attendance: 48,909
Referee: Howard Webb (England)

Benfica won 4–3 on aggregate.

22 February 2012
20:45

| Marseille (France) | 1–0 | (Italy) Internazionale |
|---|---|---|
| A. Ayew 90+3' | Report |

Stade Vélodrome, Marseille
Attendance: 37,646
Referee: Cüneyt Çakır (Turkey)
13 March 2012
20:45

| Internazionale (Italy) | 2–1 | (France) Marseille |
|---|---|---|
| Milito 75'; Pazzini 90+6' (pen.) | Report | Brandão 90+2' |

San Siro, Milan
Attendance: 63,632
Referee: Pedro Proença (Portugal)

2–2 on aggregate; Marseille won on away goals.

== Quarter-finals ==
=== Summary ===
The draw for the quarter-finals was held on 16 March 2012. The first legs were played on 27 and 28 March, and the second legs were played on 3 and 4 April 2012.

| Team 1 | Agg. | Team 2 | 1st leg | 2nd leg |
|---|---|---|---|---|
| APOEL (Cyprus) | 2–8 | (Spain) Real Madrid | 0–3 | 2–5 |
| Marseille (France) | 0–4 | (Germany) Bayern Munich | 0–2 | 0–2 |
| Benfica (Portugal) | 1–3 | (England) Chelsea | 0–1 | 1–2 |
| Milan (Italy) | 1–3 | (Spain) Barcelona | 0–0 | 1–3 |

=== Matches ===
27 March 2012
20:45 (21:45 UTC+3)

| APOEL (Cyprus) | 0–3 | (Spain) Real Madrid |
|---|---|---|
| | Report | Benzema 74', 90'; Kaká 82' |

GSP Stadium, Nicosia
Attendance: 22,385
Referee: Felix Brych (Germany)
4 April 2012
20:45

| Real Madrid (Spain) | 5–2 | (Cyprus) APOEL |
|---|---|---|
| Ronaldo 26', 76'; Kaká 37'; Callejón 80'; Di María 84' | Report | Manduca 67'; Solari 82' (pen.) |

Santiago Bernabéu, Madrid
Attendance: 54,627
Referee: Gianluca Rocchi (Italy)

Real Madrid won 8–2 on aggregate.

28 March 2012
20:45

| Marseille (France) | 0–2 | (Germany) Bayern Munich |
|---|---|---|
| | Report | Gómez 44'; Robben 69' |

Stade Vélodrome, Marseille
Attendance: 31,683
Referee: Carlos Velasco Carballo (Spain)
3 April 2012
20:45

| Bayern Munich (Germany) | 2–0 | (France) Marseille |
|---|---|---|
| Olić 13', 37' | Report |

Allianz Arena, Munich
Attendance: 66,000
Referee: Svein Oddvar Moen (Norway)

Bayern Munich won 4–0 on aggregate.

27 March 2012
20:45 (19:45 UTC+1)

| Benfica (Portugal) | 0–1 | (England) Chelsea |
|---|---|---|
| | Report | Kalou 75' |

Estádio da Luz, Lisbon
Attendance: 60,830
Referee: Paolo Tagliavento (Italy)
4 April 2012
20:45 (19:45 UTC+1)

| Chelsea (England) | 2–1 | (Portugal) Benfica |
|---|---|---|
| Lampard 21' (pen.); Meireles 90+3' | Report | Javi García 85' |

Stamford Bridge, London
Attendance: 37,264
Referee: Damir Skomina (Slovenia)

Chelsea won 3–1 on aggregate.

28 March 2012
20:45

| Milan (Italy) | 0–0 | (Spain) Barcelona |
|---|---|---|
| | Report |

San Siro, Milan
Attendance: 76,169
Referee: Jonas Eriksson (Sweden)
3 April 2012
20:45

| Barcelona (Spain) | 3–1 | (Italy) Milan |
|---|---|---|
| Messi 11' (pen.), 41' (pen.); Iniesta 53' | Report | Nocerino 32' |

Camp Nou, Barcelona
Attendance: 94,629
Referee: Björn Kuipers (Netherlands)

Barcelona won 3–1 on aggregate.

== Semi-finals ==
=== Summary ===
The draw for the semi-finals was held on 16 March 2012, after the quarter-final draw. The first legs were played on 17 and 18 April, and the second legs were played on 24 and 25 April 2012.

| Team 1 | Agg. | Team 2 | 1st leg | 2nd leg |
|---|---|---|---|---|
| Bayern Munich (Germany) | 3–3 (3–1 p) | (Spain) Real Madrid | 2–1 | 1–2 (a.e.t.) |
| Chelsea (England) | 3–2 | (Spain) Barcelona | 1–0 | 2–2 |

=== Matches ===
17 April 2012
20:45

| Bayern Munich (Germany) | 2–1 | (Spain) Real Madrid |
|---|---|---|
| Ribéry 17'; Gómez 90' | Report | Özil 53' |

Allianz Arena, Munich
Attendance: 66,000
Referee: Howard Webb (England)
25 April 2012
20:45

| Real Madrid (Spain) | 2–1 (a.e.t.) | (Germany) Bayern Munich |
|---|---|---|
| Ronaldo 6' (pen.), 14' | Report | Robben 27' (pen.) |
Penalties
| Ronaldo (penalty missed); Kaká (penalty missed); Alonso (penalty scored); Ramos (penalty missed) | 1–3 | (penalty scored) Alaba; (penalty scored) Gómez; (penalty missed) Kroos; (penalty missed) Lahm; (penalty scored) Schweinsteiger |

Santiago Bernabéu, Madrid
Attendance: 71,654
Referee: Viktor Kassai (Hungary)

3–3 on aggregate; Bayern Munich won 3–1 on penalties.

18 April 2012
20:45 (19:45 UTC+1)

| Chelsea (England) | 1–0 | (Spain) Barcelona |
|---|---|---|
| Drogba 45+2' | Report |

Stamford Bridge, London
Attendance: 38,039
Referee: Felix Brych (Germany)
24 April 2012
20:45

| Barcelona (Spain) | 2–2 | (England) Chelsea |
|---|---|---|
| Busquets 35'; Iniesta 43' | Report | Terry (red card) 37'; Ramires 45+1'; Torres 90+1' |

Camp Nou, Barcelona
Attendance: 95,845
Referee: Cüneyt Çakır (Turkey)

Chelsea won 3–2 on aggregate.

== Final ==
The final was played on 19 May 2012 at the Allianz Arena in Munich, Germany. A draw was held on 16 March 2012, after the quarter-final and semi-final draws, to determine the "home" team for administrative purposes.

19 May 2012
20:45

| Bayern Munich (Germany) | 1–1 (a.e.t.) | (England) Chelsea |
|---|---|---|
| Müller 83' | Report | Drogba 88' |
Penalties
| Lahm (penalty scored); Gómez (penalty scored); Neuer (penalty scored); Olić (penalty missed); Schweinsteiger (penalty missed) | 3–4 | (penalty missed) Mata; (penalty scored) David Luiz; (penalty scored) Lampard; (penalty scored) Cole; (penalty scored) Drogba |

Allianz Arena, Munich
Attendance: 62,500
Referee: Pedro Proença (Portugal)
