= 2011–12 UEFA Champions League group stage =

The group stage featured 32 teams: the 22 automatic qualifiers and the 10 winners of the play-off round (five through the Champions Route, five through the League Route).

The teams were drawn into eight groups of four, and played each other home-and-away in a round-robin format. The matchdays were 13–14 September, 27–28 September, 18–19 October, 1–2 November, 22–23 November, and 6–7 December 2011.

The top two teams in each group advanced to the first knockout round, while the third-placed teams dropped down to the Europa League round of 32.

== Teams ==
The draw for the group stage was held at Grimaldi Forum, Monaco on 25 August 2011 at 17:45 CEST (UTC+02:00).

Teams were seeded into four pots based on their 2011 UEFA club coefficients. The title holders, Barcelona, were automatically seeded into Pot 1. Pot 1 held teams ranked 1–9, Pot 2 held teams ranked 10–24, Pot 3 held teams ranked 31–83, while Pot 4 held teams ranked 86–200 and unranked teams.

Key to colours
Qualified for the Champions League round of 16.
Qualified for the Europa League round of 32.

Pot 1
Team	Notes	Coeff.
(Spain) Barcelona		141.465
(England) Manchester United		151.157
(England) Chelsea		129.157
(Germany) Bayern Munich		118.887
(England) Arsenal		108.157
(Spain) Real Madrid		103.408
(Portugal) Porto		100.319
(Italy) Internazionale		100.110

Pot 2
Team	Notes	Coeff.
(Italy) Milan		94.110
(France) Lyon		92.735
(Ukraine) Shakhtar Donetsk		87.776
(Spain) Valencia		85.408
(Portugal) Benfica		81.319
(Spain) Villarreal		75.465
(Russia) CSKA Moscow		73.941
(France) Marseille		68.735

Pot 3
Team	Notes	Coeff.
(Russia) Zenit Saint Petersburg		60.441
(Netherlands) Ajax		56.025
(Germany) Bayer Leverkusen		54.887
(Greece) Olympiacos		50.833
(England) Manchester City		47.157
(France) Lille		40.735
(Switzerland) Basel		39.980
(Belarus) BATE Borisov		23.216

Pot 4
Team	Notes	Coeff.
(Germany) Borussia Dortmund		22.887
(Italy) Napoli		21.110
(Croatia) Dinamo Zagreb		20.224
(Cyprus) APOEL		13.124
(Turkey) Trabzonspor		12.010
(Belgium) Genk		8.400
(Czech Republic) Viktoria Plzeň		5.170
(Romania) Oțelul Galați		5.164

Notes

1. ^{TH} Champions League title holders (automatic top seed of pot 1)
2. ^{CR} Qualified through play-off round (Champions Route)
3. ^{LR} Qualified through play-off round (League Route)

For the group stage draw, teams from the same national association cannot be drawn against each other. Moreover, the draw was controlled for teams from the same association in order to split the teams evenly into the two sets of groups (A–D, E–H) for maximum television coverage.

The fixtures were decided after the draw. On each matchday, four groups played their matches on Tuesday, while the other four groups played their matches on Wednesday, with the two sets of groups (A–D, E–H) alternating between each matchday. There are other restrictions, e.g., teams from the same city (e.g. Milan and Internazionale, which also share a stadium) do not play at home on the same matchday (UEFA tries to avoid teams from the same city playing at home on the same day or on consecutive days), and Russian teams do not play at home on the last matchday due to cold weather.

== Tie-breaking criteria ==
If two or more teams were equal on points on completion of the group matches, the following criteria would be applied to determine the rankings:

1. higher number of points obtained in the group matches played among the teams in question;
2. superior goal difference from the group matches played among the teams in question;
3. higher number of goals scored in the group matches played among the teams in question;
4. higher number of goals scored away from home in the group matches played among the teams in question;
5. If, after applying criteria 1) to 4) to several teams, two teams still have an equal ranking, the criteria 1) to 4) will be reapplied to determine the ranking of these teams;
6. superior goal difference from all group matches played;
7. higher number of goals scored from all group matches played;
8. higher number of coefficient points accumulated by the club in question, as well as its association, over the previous five seasons.

== Groups ==
Times are CET/CEST, (Note: CET (UTC+1) for matches from 1 November 2011, and CEST (UTC+2) for matches to 19 October 2011.) as listed by UEFA (local times, if different, are in parentheses).

=== Group A ===
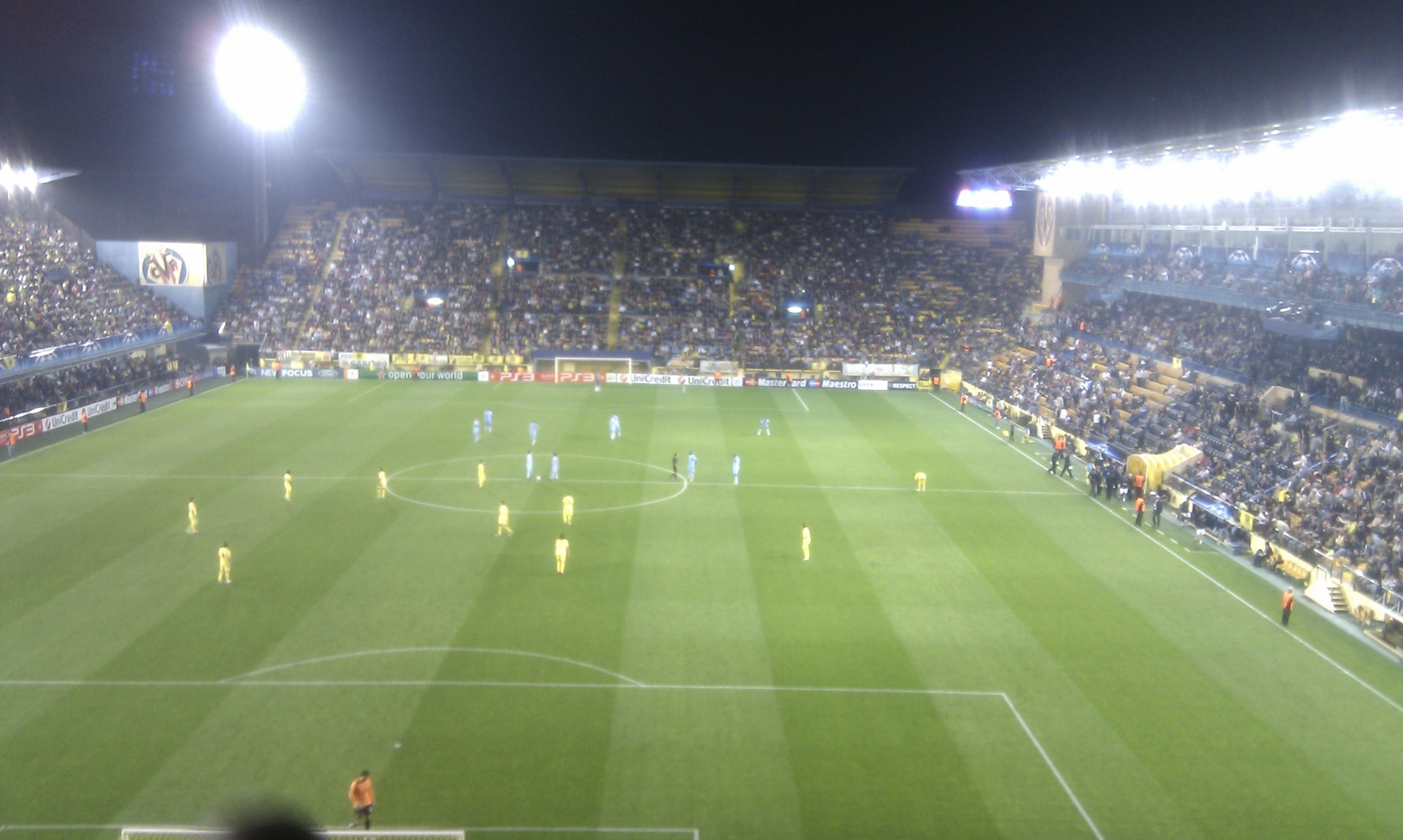
Group A match between Villarreal and Manchester City.

Pos	Team	Pld	W	D	L	GF	GA	GD	Pts	Qualification	BAY	NAP	MCI	VIL
1	(Germany) Bayern Munich	6	4	1	1	11	6	+5	13	Advance to knockout phase	—	3–2	2–0	3–1
2	(Italy) Napoli	6	3	2	1	10	6	+4	11	Advance to knockout phase	1–1	—	2–1	2–0
3	(England) Manchester City	6	3	1	2	9	6	+3	10	Transfer to Europa League	2–0	1–1	—	2–1
4	(Spain) Villarreal	6	0	0	6	2	14	−12	0		0–2	0–2	0–3	—

Source: Soccerway
14 September 2011
20:45 (19:45 UTC+1)

Manchester City (England)	1–1	(Italy) Napoli
Kolarov 74'	Report	Cavani 69'

City of Manchester Stadium, Manchester
Attendance: 44,026
Referee: Jonas Eriksson (Sweden)
14 September 2011
20:45

Villarreal (Spain)	0–2	(Germany) Bayern Munich
	Report	Kroos 7'; Rafinha 76'

Estadio El Madrigal, Villarreal
Attendance: 19,168
Referee: Cüneyt Çakır (Turkey)

27 September 2011
20:45

Bayern Munich (Germany)	2–0	(England) Manchester City
Gómez 38', 45+1'	Report

Allianz Arena, Munich
Attendance: 66,000
Referee: Viktor Kassai (Hungary)
27 September 2011
20:45

Napoli (Italy)	2–0	(Spain) Villarreal
Hamšík 15'; Cavani 17' (pen.)	Report

Stadio San Paolo, Naples
Attendance: 46,747
Referee: Frank De Bleeckere (Belgium)

18 October 2011
20:45

Napoli (Italy)	1–1	(Germany) Bayern Munich
Badstuber 39' (o.g.)	Report	Kroos 2'

Stadio San Paolo, Naples
Attendance: 60,074
Referee: Olegário Benquerença (Portugal)
18 October 2011
20:45 (19:45 UTC+1)

Manchester City (England)	2–1	(Spain) Villarreal
Marchena 43' (o.g.); Agüero 90+3'	Report	Cani 4'

City of Manchester Stadium, Manchester
Attendance: 43,326
Referee: Pavel Královec (Czech Republic)

2 November 2011
20:45

Bayern Munich (Germany)	3–2	(Italy) Napoli
Gómez 17', 23', 42'	Report	Fernández 45', 79'

Allianz Arena, Munich
Attendance: 66,000
Referee: Björn Kuipers (Netherlands)
2 November 2011
20:45

Villarreal (Spain)	0–3	(England) Manchester City
	Report	Y. Touré 30', 71'; Balotelli 45+3' (pen.)

Estadio El Madrigal, Villarreal
Attendance: 19,358
Referee: Pedro Proença (Portugal)

22 November 2011
20:45

Napoli (Italy)	2–1	(England) Manchester City
Cavani 17', 49'	Report	Balotelli 33'

Stadio San Paolo, Naples
Attendance: 57,575
Referee: Damir Skomina (Slovenia)
22 November 2011
20:45

Bayern Munich (Germany)	3–1	(Spain) Villarreal
Ribéry 3', 69'; Gómez 23'	Report	De Guzmán 50'

Allianz Arena, Munich
Attendance: 66,000
Referee: Markus Strömbergsson (Sweden)

7 December 2011
20:45 (19:45 UTC+0)

Manchester City (England)	2–0	(Germany) Bayern Munich
Silva 36'; Y. Touré 52'	Report

City of Manchester Stadium, Manchester
Attendance: 46,002
Referee: Stéphane Lannoy (France)
7 December 2011
20:45

Villarreal (Spain)	0–2	(Italy) Napoli
	Report	Inler 65'; Hamšík 76'

Estadio El Madrigal, Villarreal
Attendance: 15,350
Referee: Svein Oddvar Moen (Norway)

=== Group B ===
Pos	Team	Pld	W	D	L	GF	GA	GD	Pts	Qualification	INT	CSKA	TRA	LIL
1	(Italy) Internazionale	6	3	1	2	8	7	+1	10	Advance to knockout phase	—	1–2	0–1	2–1
2	(Russia) CSKA Moscow	6	2	2	2	9	8	+1	8	Advance to knockout phase	2–3	—	3–0	0–2
3	(Turkey) Trabzonspor	6	1	4	1	3	5	−2	7	Transfer to Europa League	1–1	0–0	—	1–1
4	(France) Lille	6	1	3	2	6	6	0	6		0–1	2–2	0–0	—

Source: Soccerway
14 September 2011
20:45

Lille (France)	2–2	(Russia) CSKA Moscow
Sow 44'; Pedretti 57'	Report	Doumbia 72', 90'

Stade Lille-Metropole, Villeneuve-d'Ascq
Attendance: 15,274
Referee: Olegário Benquerença (Portugal)
14 September 2011
20:45

Internazionale (Italy)	0–1	(Turkey) Trabzonspor
	Report	Čelůstka 76'

San Siro, Milan
Attendance: 24,444
Referee: Stefan Johannesson (Sweden)

27 September 2011
18:00 (20:00 UTC+4)

CSKA Moscow (Russia)	2–3	(Italy) Internazionale
Dzagoev 45+3'; Vágner Love 77'	Report	Lúcio 6'; Pazzini 23'; Zárate 79'

Luzhniki Stadium, Moscow
Attendance: 35,000
Referee: Craig Thomson (Scotland)
27 September 2011
20:45 (21:45 UTC+3)

Trabzonspor (Turkey)	1–1	(France) Lille
Colman 75' (pen.)	Report	Sow 30'

Hüseyin Avni Aker Stadium, Trabzon
Attendance: 17,349
Referee: Björn Kuipers (Netherlands)

18 October 2011
18:00 (20:00 UTC+4)

CSKA Moscow (Russia)	3–0	(Turkey) Trabzonspor
Doumbia 29', 86'; Cauņa 76'	Report

Luzhniki Stadium, Moscow
Attendance: 18,000
Referee: Mark Clattenburg (England)
18 October 2011
20:45

Lille (France)	0–1	(Italy) Internazionale
	Report	Pazzini 21'

Stade Lille-Metropole, Villeneuve-d'Ascq
Attendance: 16,996
Referee: Howard Webb (England)

2 November 2011
20:45 (21:45 UTC+2)

Trabzonspor (Turkey)	0–0	(Russia) CSKA Moscow
	Report

Hüseyin Avni Aker Stadium, Trabzon
Attendance: 19,516
Referee: Alberto Undiano Mallenco (Spain)
2 November 2011
20:45

Internazionale (Italy)	2–1	(France) Lille
Samuel 18'; Milito 65'	Report	De Melo 83'

San Siro, Milan
Attendance: 24,299
Referee: Wolfgang Stark (Germany)

22 November 2011
18:00 (21:00 UTC+4)

CSKA Moscow (Russia)	0–2	(France) Lille
	Report	V. Berezutski 49' (o.g.); Sow 64'

Luzhniki Stadium, Moscow
Attendance: 19,100
Referee: Pavel Královec (Czech Republic)
22 November 2011
20:45 (21:45 UTC+2)

Trabzonspor (Turkey)	1–1	(Italy) Internazionale
Altıntop 23'	Report	Álvarez 18'

Hüseyin Avni Aker Stadium, Trabzon
Attendance: 21,611
Referee: Martin Atkinson (England)

7 December 2011
20:45

Lille (France)	0–0	(Turkey) Trabzonspor
	Report

Stade Lille-Metropole, Villeneuve-d'Ascq
Attendance: 16,375
Referee: Pedro Proença (Portugal)
7 December 2011
20:45

Internazionale (Italy)	1–2	(Russia) CSKA Moscow
Cambiasso 51'	Report	Doumbia 50'; V. Berezutski 86'

San Siro, Milan
Attendance: 23,295
Referee: David Fernández Borbalán (Spain)

=== Group C ===
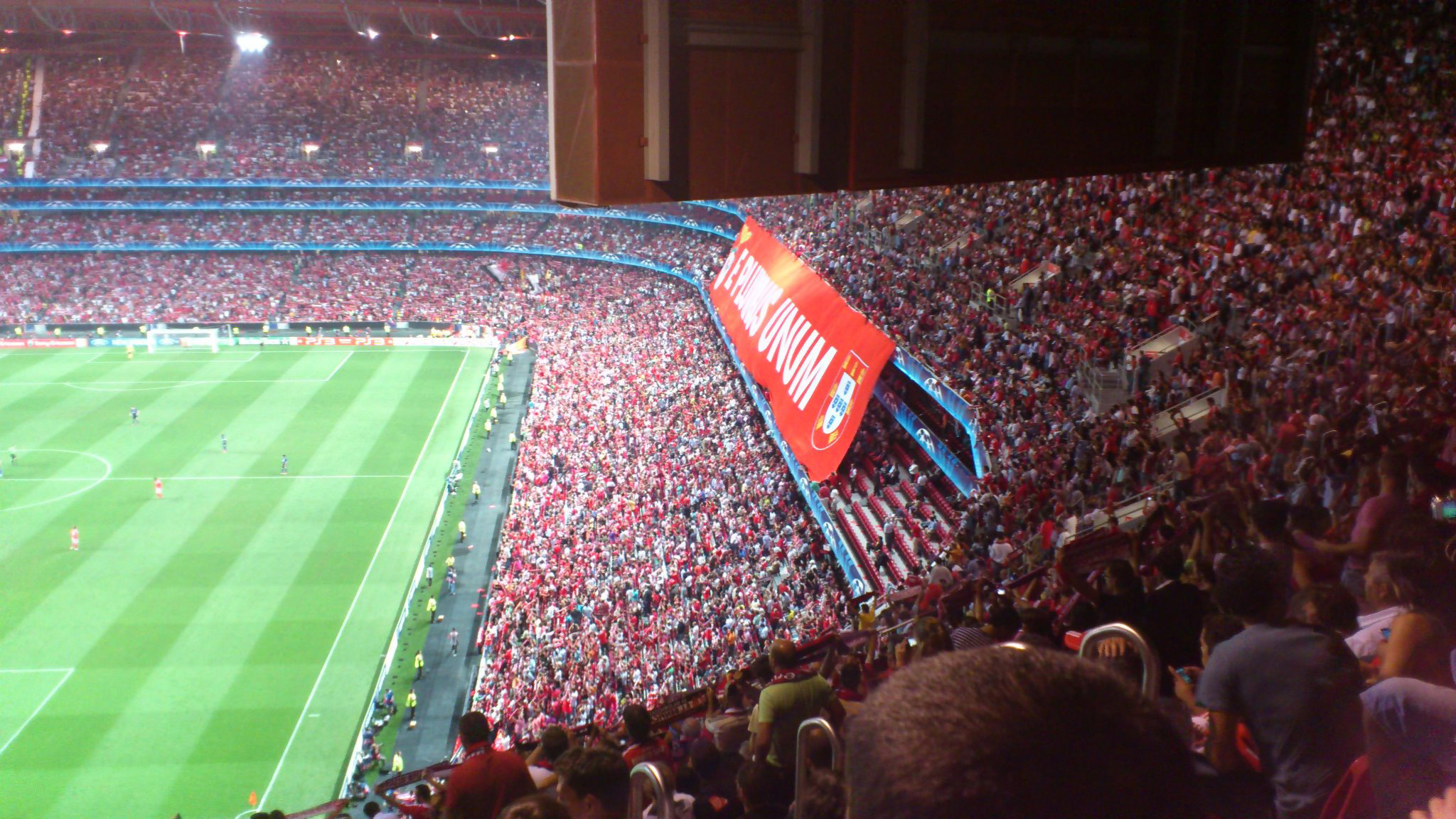
The Estádio da Luz during the match between Benfica and Manchester United

Pos	Team	Pld	W	D	L	GF	GA	GD	Pts	Qualification	BEN	BSL	MUN	OTE
1	(Portugal) Benfica	6	3	3	0	8	4	+4	12	Advance to knockout phase	—	1–1	1–1	1–0
2	(Switzerland) Basel	6	3	2	1	11	10	+1	11	Advance to knockout phase	0–2	—	2–1	2–1
3	(England) Manchester United	6	2	3	1	11	8	+3	9	Transfer to Europa League	2–2	3–3	—	2–0
4	(Romania) Oțelul Galați	6	0	0	6	3	11	−8	0		0–1	2–3	0–2	—

Source: Soccerway
14 September 2011
20:45

Basel (Switzerland)	2–1	(Romania) Oțelul Galați
F. Frei 39'; A. Frei 84' (pen.)	Report	Pena 58'

St. Jakob-Park, Basel
Attendance: 30,126
Referee: William Collum (Scotland)
14 September 2011
20:45 (19:45 UTC+1)

Benfica (Portugal)	1–1	(England) Manchester United
Cardozo 24'	Report	Giggs 42'

Estádio da Luz, Lisbon
Attendance: 63,822
Referee: Damir Skomina (Slovenia)

27 September 2011
20:45 (19:45 UTC+1)

Manchester United (England)	3–3	(Switzerland) Basel
Welbeck 16', 17'; Young 90'	Report	F. Frei 58'; A. Frei 61', 76' (pen.)

Old Trafford, Manchester
Attendance: 73,115
Referee: Paolo Tagliavento (Italy)
27 September 2011
20:45 (21:45 UTC+3)

Oțelul Galați (Romania)	0–1	(Portugal) Benfica
	Report	Bruno César 40'

Arena Națională, Bucharest (Note: Oțelul Galați played their home matches at Arena Națională, Bucharest as their own Stadionul Oţelul did not meet UEFA criteria.)
Attendance: 6,824
Referee: David Fernández Borbalán (Spain)

18 October 2011
20:45 (21:45 UTC+3)

Oțelul Galați (Romania)	0–2	(England) Manchester United
	Report	Rooney 64' (pen.), 90+2' (pen.)

Arena Națională, Bucharest
Attendance: 28,047
Referee: Felix Brych (Germany)
18 October 2011
20:45

Basel (Switzerland)	0–2	(Portugal) Benfica
	Report	Bruno César 20'; Cardozo 75'

St. Jakob-Park, Basel
Attendance: 35,831
Referee: Viktor Kassai (Hungary)

2 November 2011
20:45 (19:45 UTC+0)

Manchester United (England)	2–0	(Romania) Oțelul Galați
Valencia 8'; Sârghi 88' (o.g.)	Report

Old Trafford, Manchester
Attendance: 74,847
Referee: Marijo Strahonja (Croatia)
2 November 2011
20:45 (19:45 UTC+0)

Benfica (Portugal)	1–1	(Switzerland) Basel
Rodrigo 4'	Report	Huggel 64'

Estádio da Luz, Lisbon
Attendance: 39,270
Referee: Carlos Velasco Carballo (Spain)

22 November 2011
20:45 (21:45 UTC+2)

Oțelul Galați (Romania)	2–3	(Switzerland) Basel
Giurgiu 75'; Antal 81'	Report	F. Frei 10'; A. Frei 14'; Streller 37'

Arena Națională, Bucharest
Attendance: 5,797
Referee: Tom Harald Hagen (Norway)
22 November 2011
20:45 (19:45 UTC+0)

Manchester United (England)	2–2	(Portugal) Benfica
Berbatov 30'; Fletcher 59'	Report	Jones 3' (o.g.); Aimar 61'

Old Trafford, Manchester
Attendance: 74,873
Referee: Cüneyt Çakır (Turkey)

7 December 2011
20:45

Basel (Switzerland)	2–1	(England) Manchester United
Streller 9'; A. Frei 84'	Report	Jones 89'

St. Jakob-Park, Basel
Attendance: 36,000
Referee: Björn Kuipers (Netherlands)
7 December 2011
20:45 (19:45 UTC+0)

Benfica (Portugal)	1–0	(Romania) Oțelul Galați
Cardozo 7'	Report

Estádio da Luz, Lisbon
Attendance: 35,155
Referee: Manuel Gräfe (Germany)

=== Group D ===
Pos	Team	Pld	W	D	L	GF	GA	GD	Pts	Qualification	RMA	LYO	AJX	DZG
1	(Spain) Real Madrid	6	6	0	0	19	2	+17	18	Advance to knockout phase	—	4–0	3–0	6–2
2	(France) Lyon	6	2	2	2	9	7	+2	8 (Note: Tied on head-to-head results. Overall goal difference was used as the tiebreaker.)	Advance to knockout phase	0–2	—	0–0	2–0
3	(Netherlands) Ajax	6	2	2	2	6	6	0	8	Transfer to Europa League	0–3	0–0	—	4–0
4	(Croatia) Dinamo Zagreb	6	0	0	6	3	22	−19	0		0–1	1–7	0–2	—

Source: Soccerway
Notes:
14 September 2011
20:45

Dinamo Zagreb (Croatia)	0–1	(Spain) Real Madrid
	Report	Di María 53'

Stadion Maksimir, Zagreb
Attendance: 27,055
Referee: Svein Oddvar Moen (Norway)
14 September 2011
20:45

Ajax (Netherlands)	0–0	(France) Lyon
	Report

Amsterdam Arena, Amsterdam
Attendance: 49,504
Referee: Wolfgang Stark (Germany)

27 September 2011
20:45

Lyon (France)	2–0	(Croatia) Dinamo Zagreb
Gomis 23'; B. Koné 42'	Report

Stade de Gerland, Lyon
Attendance: 34,432
Referee: Pavel Královec (Czech Republic)
27 September 2011
20:45

Real Madrid (Spain)	3–0	(Netherlands) Ajax
Ronaldo 25'; Kaká 41'; Benzema 49'	Report

Santiago Bernabéu Stadium, Madrid
Attendance: 70,320
Referee: Mark Clattenburg (England)

18 October 2011
20:45

Real Madrid (Spain)	4–0	(France) Lyon
Benzema 19'; Khedira 47'; Lloris 55' (o.g.); Ramos 81'	Report

Santiago Bernabéu Stadium, Madrid
Attendance: 70,028
Referee: Cüneyt Çakır (Turkey)
18 October 2011
20:45

Dinamo Zagreb (Croatia)	0–2	(Netherlands) Ajax
	Report	Boerrigter 49'; Eriksen 90'

Stadion Maksimir, Zagreb
Attendance: 25,714
Referee: Manuel Gräfe (Germany)

2 November 2011
20:45

Lyon (France)	0–2	(Spain) Real Madrid
	Report	Ronaldo 24', 69' (pen.)

Stade de Gerland, Lyon
Attendance: 40,099
Referee: Nicola Rizzoli (Italy)
2 November 2011
20:45

Ajax (Netherlands)	4–0	(Croatia) Dinamo Zagreb
Van der Wiel 20'; Sulejmani 25'; De Jong 65'; Lodeiro 90+2'	Report

Amsterdam Arena, Amsterdam
Attendance: 49,707
Referee: Martin Atkinson (England)

22 November 2011
20:45

Real Madrid (Spain)	6–2	(Croatia) Dinamo Zagreb
Benzema 2', 66'; Callejón 7', 49'; Higuaín 9'; Özil 20'	Report	Bećiraj 81'; Tomečak 90'

Santiago Bernabéu Stadium, Madrid
Attendance: 65,415
Referee: Alan Kelly (Republic of Ireland)
22 November 2011
20:45

Lyon (France)	0–0	(Netherlands) Ajax
	Report

Stade de Gerland, Lyon
Attendance: 35,070
Referee: Jonas Eriksson (Sweden)

7 December 2011
20:45

Dinamo Zagreb (Croatia)	1–7	(France) Lyon
Kovačić 40'	Report	Gomis 45', 48', 52', 70'; Gonalons 47'; Lisandro 64'; Briand 75'

Stadion Maksimir, Zagreb
Attendance: 16,457
Referee: Mark Clattenburg (England)
7 December 2011
20:45

Ajax (Netherlands)	0–3	(Spain) Real Madrid
	Report	Callejón 14', 90+2'; Higuaín 41'

Amsterdam Arena, Amsterdam
Attendance: 51,557
Referee: Jorge Sousa (Portugal)

=== Group E ===
Pos	Team	Pld	W	D	L	GF	GA	GD	Pts	Qualification	CHE	LEV	VAL	GNK
1	(England) Chelsea	6	3	2	1	13	4	+9	11	Advance to knockout phase	—	2–0	3–0	5–0
2	(Germany) Bayer Leverkusen	6	3	1	2	8	8	0	10	Advance to knockout phase	2–1	—	2–1	2–0
3	(Spain) Valencia	6	2	2	2	12	7	+5	8	Transfer to Europa League	1–1	3–1	—	7–0
4	(Belgium) Genk	6	0	3	3	2	16	−14	3		1–1	1–1	0–0	—

Source: Soccerway
13 September 2011
20:45 (19:45 UTC+1)

Chelsea (England)	2–0	(Germany) Bayer Leverkusen
David Luiz 67'; Mata 90+2'	Report

Stamford Bridge, London
Attendance: 33,820
Referee: Stéphane Lannoy (France)
13 September 2011
20:45

Genk (Belgium)	0–0	(Spain) Valencia
	Report

Cristal Arena, Genk
Attendance: 20,248
Referee: Thomas Einwaller (Austria)

28 September 2011
20:45

Valencia (Spain)	1–1	(England) Chelsea
Soldado 87' (pen.)	Report	Lampard 56'

Mestalla Stadium, Valencia
Attendance: 33,791
Referee: Nicola Rizzoli (Italy)
28 September 2011
20:45

Bayer Leverkusen (Germany)	2–0	(Belgium) Genk
Bender 30'; Ballack 90+1'	Report

BayArena, Leverkusen
Attendance: 25,138
Referee: Alan Kelly (Republic of Ireland)

19 October 2011
20:45

Bayer Leverkusen (Germany)	2–1	(Spain) Valencia
Schürrle 52'; Sam 56'	Report	Jonas 24'

BayArena, Leverkusen
Attendance: 26,384
Referee: Craig Thomson (Scotland)
19 October 2011
20:45 (19:45 UTC+1)

Chelsea (England)	5–0	(Belgium) Genk
Meireles 8'; Torres 11', 27'; Ivanović 42'; Kalou 72'	Report

Stamford Bridge, London
Attendance: 38,518
Referee: Aleksei Nikolaev (Russia)

1 November 2011
20:45

Valencia (Spain)	3–1	(Germany) Bayer Leverkusen
Jonas 1'; Soldado 65'; Rami 75'	Report	Kießling 31'

Mestalla Stadium, Valencia
Attendance: 37,047
Referee: Jonas Eriksson (Sweden)
1 November 2011
20:45

Genk (Belgium)	1–1	(England) Chelsea
Vossen 61'	Report	Ramires 26'

Cristal Arena, Genk
Attendance: 22,584
Referee: Svein Oddvar Moen (Norway)

23 November 2011
20:45

Bayer Leverkusen (Germany)	2–1	(England) Chelsea
Derdiyok 73'; Friedrich 90+1'	Report	Drogba 48'

BayArena, Leverkusen
Attendance: 29,285
Referee: Viktor Kassai (Hungary)
23 November 2011
20:45

Valencia (Spain)	7–0	(Belgium) Genk
Jonas 10'; Soldado 13', 35', 39'; Hernández 68'; Aduriz 70'; T. Costa 81'	Report

Mestalla Stadium, Valencia
Attendance: 35,086
Referee: Tony Chapron (France)

6 December 2011
20:45 (19:45 UTC+0)

Chelsea (England)	3–0	(Spain) Valencia
Drogba 3', 76'; Ramires 22'	Report

Stamford Bridge, London
Attendance: 41,109
Referee: Gianluca Rocchi (Italy)
6 December 2011
20:45

Genk (Belgium)	1–1	(Germany) Bayer Leverkusen
Vossen 30'	Report	Derdiyok 79'

Cristal Arena, Genk
Attendance: 21,187
Referee: Paolo Tagliavento (Italy)

=== Group F ===
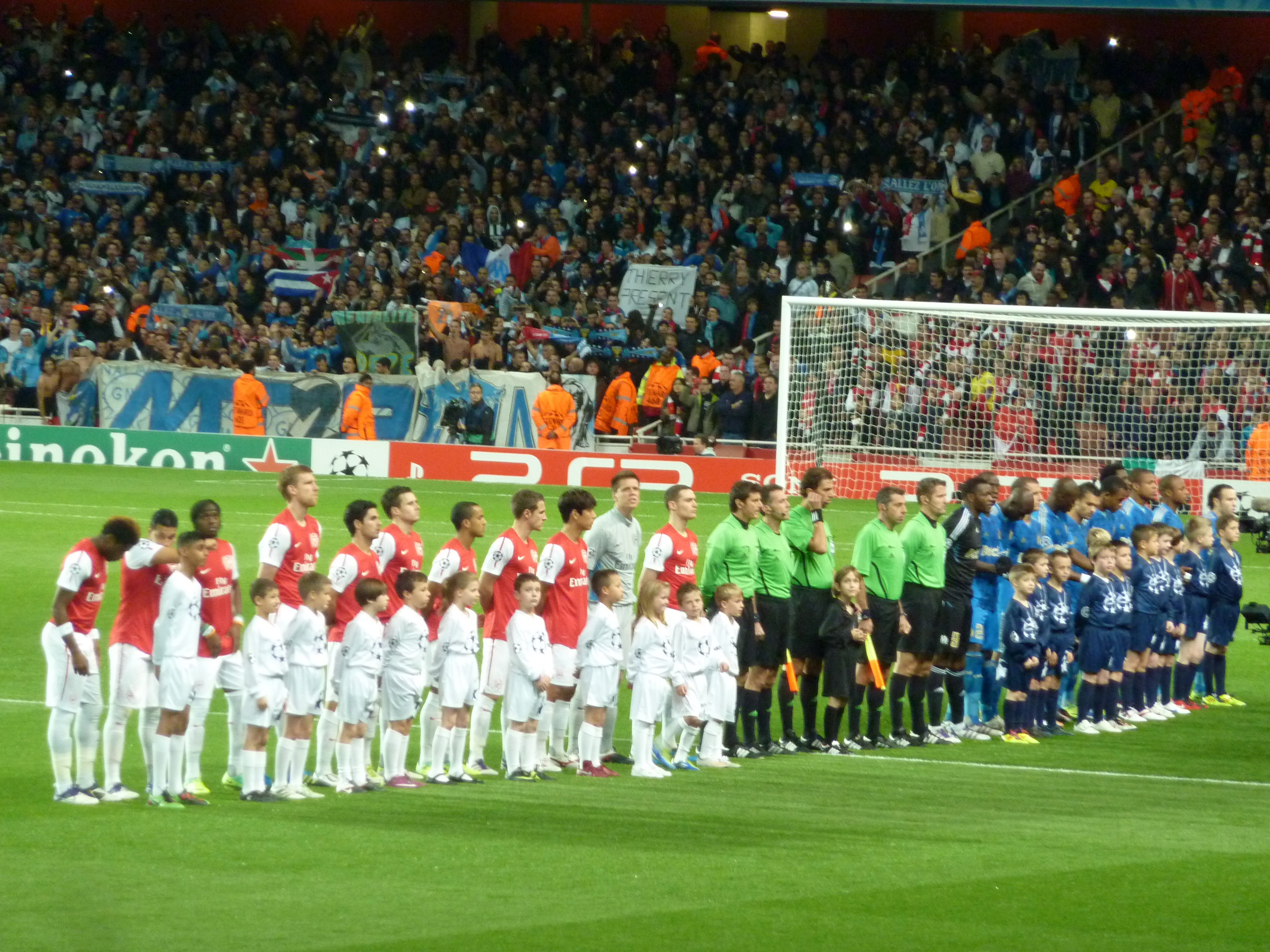
Group F match between Arsenal and Marseille.

Pos	Team	Pld	W	D	L	GF	GA	GD	Pts	Qualification	ARS	MAR	OLY	DOR
1	(England) Arsenal	6	3	2	1	7	6	+1	11	Advance to knockout phase	—	0–0	2–1	2–1
2	(France) Marseille	6	3	1	2	7	4	+3	10	Advance to knockout phase	0–1	—	0–1	3–0
3	(Greece) Olympiacos	6	3	0	3	8	6	+2	9	Transfer to Europa League	3–1	0–1	—	3–1
4	(Germany) Borussia Dortmund	6	1	1	4	6	12	−6	4		1–1	2–3	1–0	—

Source: Soccerway
13 September 2011
20:45 (21:45 UTC+3)

Olympiacos (Greece)	0–1	(France) Marseille
	Report	González 51'

Karaiskakis Stadium, Piraeus
Attendance: 30,040
Referee: Pedro Proença (Portugal)
13 September 2011
20:45

Borussia Dortmund (Germany)	1–1	(England) Arsenal
Perišić 88'	Report	Van Persie 42'

Signal Iduna Park, Dortmund
Attendance: 65,590
Referee: Gianluca Rocchi (Italy)

28 September 2011
20:45 (19:45 UTC+1)

Arsenal (England)	2–1	(Greece) Olympiacos
Oxlade-Chamberlain 8'; Santos 20'	Report	Fuster 27'

Emirates Stadium, London
Attendance: 59,676
Referee: Carlos Velasco Carballo (Spain)
28 September 2011
20:45

Marseille (France)	3–0	(Germany) Borussia Dortmund
A. Ayew 20', 69' (pen.); Rémy 62'	Report

Stade Vélodrome, Marseille
Attendance: 26,142
Referee: Jonas Eriksson (Sweden)

19 October 2011
20:45

Marseille (France)	0–1	(England) Arsenal
	Report	Ramsey 90+2'

Stade Vélodrome, Marseille
Attendance: 33,258
Referee: Damir Skomina (Slovenia)
19 October 2011
20:45 (21:45 UTC+3)

Olympiacos (Greece)	3–1	(Germany) Borussia Dortmund
Holebas 8'; Djebbour 40'; Modesto 78'	Report	Lewandowski 26'

Karaiskakis Stadium, Piraeus
Attendance: 29,638
Referee: Bas Nijhuis (Netherlands)

1 November 2011
20:45 (19:45 UTC+0)

Arsenal (England)	0–0	(France) Marseille
	Report

Emirates Stadium, London
Attendance: 59,961
Referee: Paolo Tagliavento (Italy)
1 November 2011
20:45

Borussia Dortmund (Germany)	1–0	(Greece) Olympiacos
Großkreutz 7'	Report

Signal Iduna Park, Dortmund
Attendance: 65,590
Referee: Vladislav Bezborodov (Russia)

23 November 2011
20:45

Marseille (France)	0–1	(Greece) Olympiacos
	Report	Fetfatzidis 82'

Stade Vélodrome, Marseille
Attendance: 25,392
Referee: Nicola Rizzoli (Italy)
23 November 2011
20:45 (19:45 UTC+0)

Arsenal (England)	2–1	(Germany) Borussia Dortmund
Van Persie 49', 86'	Report	Kagawa 90+2'

Emirates Stadium, London
Attendance: 59,531
Referee: Frank De Bleeckere (Belgium)

6 December 2011
20:45 (21:45 UTC+2)

Olympiacos (Greece)	3–1	(England) Arsenal
Djebbour 16'; Fuster 36'; Modesto 89'	Report	Benayoun 57'

Karaiskakis Stadium, Piraeus
Attendance: 30,816
Referee: Alberto Undiano Mallenco (Spain)
6 December 2011
20:45

Borussia Dortmund (Germany)	2–3	(France) Marseille
Błaszczykowski 23'; Hummels 32' (pen.)	Report	Rémy 45+4'; A. Ayew 85'; Valbuena 87'

Signal Iduna Park, Dortmund
Attendance: 65,000
Referee: Howard Webb (England)

=== Group G ===
Pos	Team	Pld	W	D	L	GF	GA	GD	Pts	Qualification	APO	ZEN	POR	SHK
1	(Cyprus) APOEL	6	2	3	1	6	6	0	9 (Note: Head-to-head points: APOEL 4, Zenit Saint Petersburg 1.)	Advance to knockout phase	—	2–1	2–1	0–2
2	(Russia) Zenit Saint Petersburg	6	2	3	1	7	5	+2	9	Advance to knockout phase	0–0	—	3–1	1–0
3	(Portugal) Porto	6	2	2	2	7	7	0	8	Transfer to Europa League	1–1	0–0	—	2–1
4	(Ukraine) Shakhtar Donetsk	6	1	2	3	6	8	−2	5		1–1	2–2	0–2	—

Source: Soccerway
Notes:
13 September 2011
20:45 (19:45 UTC+1)

Porto (Portugal)	2–1	(Ukraine) Shakhtar Donetsk
Hulk 28'; Kléber 51'	Report	Luiz Adriano 12'

Estádio do Dragão, Porto
Attendance: 36,612
Referee: Felix Brych (Germany)
13 September 2011
20:45 (21:45 UTC+3)

APOEL (Cyprus)	2–1	(Russia) Zenit Saint Petersburg
Manduca 73'; Aílton 75'	Report	Zyryanov 63'

GSP Stadium, Nicosia
Attendance: 21,269
Referee: Eduardo Iturralde González (Spain)

28 September 2011
18:00 (20:00 UTC+4)

Zenit Saint Petersburg (Russia)	3–1	(Portugal) Porto
Shirokov 20', 63'; Danny 72'	Report	J. Rodríguez 10'

Petrovsky Stadium, Saint Petersburg
Attendance: 21,450
Referee: Howard Webb (England)
28 September 2011
20:45 (21:45 UTC+3)

Shakhtar Donetsk (Ukraine)	1–1	(Cyprus) APOEL
Jádson 64'	Report	Tričkovski 61'

Donbas Arena, Donetsk
Attendance: 47,014
Referee: Robert Schörgenhofer (Austria)

19 October 2011
20:45 (21:45 UTC+3)

Shakhtar Donetsk (Ukraine)	2–2	(Russia) Zenit Saint Petersburg
Willian 15'; Luiz Adriano 45+1'	Report	Shirokov 33'; Fayzulin 60'

Donbas Arena, Donetsk
Attendance: 50,578
Referee: Frank De Bleeckere (Belgium)
19 October 2011
20:45 (19:45 UTC+0)

Porto (Portugal)	1–1	(Cyprus) APOEL
Hulk 13'	Report	Aílton 19'

Estádio do Dragão, Porto
Attendance: 32,512
Referee: Antony Gautier (France)

1 November 2011
18:00 (21:00 UTC+4)

Zenit Saint Petersburg (Russia)	1–0	(Ukraine) Shakhtar Donetsk
Lombaerts 45+1'	Report

Petrovsky Stadium, Saint Petersburg
Attendance: 21,405
Referee: Stéphane Lannoy (France)
1 November 2011
20:45 (21:45 UTC+2)

APOEL (Cyprus)	2–1	(Portugal) Porto
Aílton 42' (pen.); Manduca 90'	Report	Hulk 89' (pen.)

GSP Stadium, Nicosia
Attendance: 22,301
Referee: Gianluca Rocchi (Italy)

23 November 2011
18:00 (21:00 UTC+4)

Zenit Saint Petersburg (Russia)	0–0	(Cyprus) APOEL
	Report

Petrovsky Stadium, Saint Petersburg
Attendance: 21,500
Referee: Felix Brych (Germany)
23 November 2011
20:45 (21:45 UTC+2)

Shakhtar Donetsk (Ukraine)	0–2	(Portugal) Porto
	Report	Hulk 79'; Raț 90' (o.g.)

Donbas Arena, Donetsk
Attendance: 42,565
Referee: Craig Thomson (Scotland)

6 December 2011
20:45 (19:45 UTC+0)

Porto (Portugal)	0–0	(Russia) Zenit Saint Petersburg
	Report

Estádio do Dragão, Porto
Attendance: 46,512
Referee: Carlos Velasco Carballo (Spain)
6 December 2011
20:45 (21:45 UTC+2)

APOEL (Cyprus)	0–2	(Ukraine) Shakhtar Donetsk
	Report	Luiz Adriano 62'; Seleznyov 78'

GSP Stadium, Nicosia
Attendance: 22,537
Referee: Ovidiu Hațegan (Romania)

=== Group H ===
Pos	Team	Pld	W	D	L	GF	GA	GD	Pts	Qualification	BAR	MIL	PLZ	BATE
1	(Spain) Barcelona	6	5	1	0	20	4	+16	16	Advance to knockout phase	—	2–2	2–0	4–0
2	(Italy) Milan	6	2	3	1	11	8	+3	9	Advance to knockout phase	2–3	—	2–0	2–0
3	(Czech Republic) Viktoria Plzeň	6	1	2	3	4	11	−7	5	Transfer to Europa League	0–4	2–2	—	1–1
4	(Belarus) BATE Borisov	6	0	2	4	2	14	−12	2		0–5	1–1	0–1	—

Source: Soccerway
13 September 2011
20:45

Barcelona (Spain)	2–2	(Italy) Milan
Pedro 36'; Villa 50'	Report	Pato 1'; Thiago Silva 90+2'

Camp Nou, Barcelona
Attendance: 89,861
Referee: Martin Atkinson (England)
13 September 2011
20:45

Viktoria Plzeň (Czech Republic)	1–1	(Belarus) BATE Borisov
Bakoš 45+1'	Report	Bressan 69'

Synot Tip Arena, Prague (Note: Viktoria Plzeň played their home matches at Synot Tip Arena, Prague as their own Stadion města Plzně did not meet UEFA criteria.)
Attendance: 19,541
Referee: Laurent Duhamel (France)

28 September 2011
20:45 (21:45 UTC+3)

BATE Borisov (Belarus)	0–5	(Spain) Barcelona
	Report	Valadzko 19' (o.g.); Pedro 22'; Messi 38', 56'; Villa 90'

Dinamo Stadium, Minsk (Note: BATE Borisov played their home matches at Dinamo Stadium, Minsk as their own City Stadium did not meet UEFA criteria.)
Attendance: 29,555
Referee: Manuel Gräfe (Germany)
28 September 2011
20:45

Milan (Italy)	2–0	(Czech Republic) Viktoria Plzeň
Ibrahimović 53' (pen.); Cassano 66'	Report

San Siro, Milan
Attendance: 66,859
Referee: Florian Meyer (Germany)

19 October 2011
20:45

Milan (Italy)	2–0	(Belarus) BATE Borisov
Ibrahimović 33'; Boateng 70'	Report

San Siro, Milan
Attendance: 66,040
Referee: Tom Harald Hagen (Norway)
19 October 2011
20:45

Barcelona (Spain)	2–0	(Czech Republic) Viktoria Plzeň
Iniesta 10'; Villa 82'	Report

Camp Nou, Barcelona
Attendance: 74,376
Referee: Aleksandar Stavrev (Macedonia)

1 November 2011
18:00 (20:00 UTC+3)

BATE Borisov (Belarus)	1–1	(Italy) Milan
Bressan 55' (pen.)	Report	Ibrahimović 22'

Dinamo Stadium, Minsk
Attendance: 29,100
Referee: Peter Rasmussen (Denmark)
1 November 2011
20:45

Viktoria Plzeň (Czech Republic)	0–4	(Spain) Barcelona
	Report	Messi 24' (pen.), 45+2', 90+2'; Fàbregas 72'

Synot Tip Arena, Prague
Attendance: 20,145
Referee: Robert Schörgenhofer (Austria)

23 November 2011
19:00 (21:00 UTC+3)

BATE Borisov (Belarus)	0–1	(Czech Republic) Viktoria Plzeň
	Report	Bakoš 42'

Dinamo Stadium, Minsk
Attendance: 26,520
Referee: Kevin Blom (Netherlands)
23 November 2011
20:45

Milan (Italy)	2–3	(Spain) Barcelona
Ibrahimović 20'; Boateng 54'	Report	Van Bommel 14' (o.g.); Messi 31' (pen.); Xavi 63'

San Siro, Milan
Attendance: 78,927
Referee: Wolfgang Stark (Germany)

6 December 2011
20:45

Barcelona (Spain)	4–0	(Belarus) BATE Borisov
Roberto 35'; Montoya 60'; Pedro 63', 89' (pen.)	Report

Camp Nou, Barcelona
Attendance: 37,374
Referee: William Collum (Scotland)
6 December 2011
20:45

Viktoria Plzeň (Czech Republic)	2–2	(Italy) Milan
Bystroň 89'; Ďuriš 90+3'	Report	Pato 47'; Robinho 48'

Synot Tip Arena, Prague
Attendance: 19,854
Referee: István Vad (Hungary)
