= Pedro Proença =

Portuguese football official (born 1970)

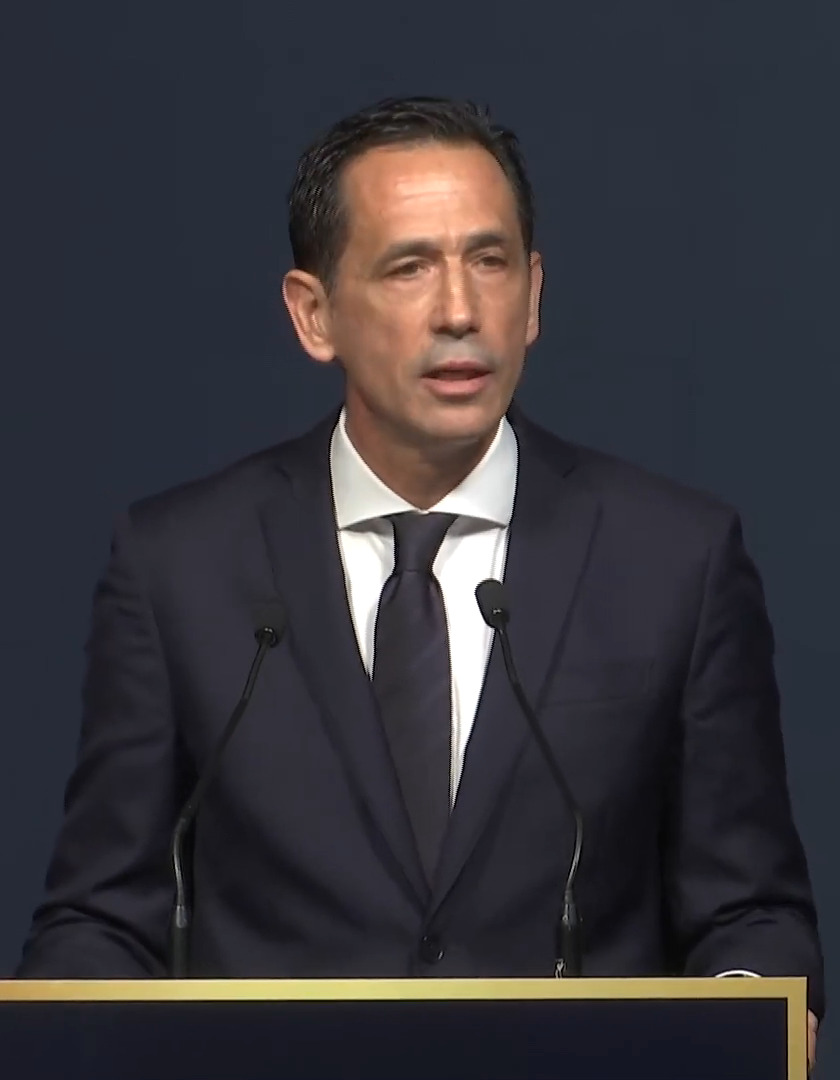
- Proença in 2025

President of the Portuguese Football Federation
- Incumbent
- Assumed office 18 February 2025
- Preceded by: Fernando Gomes

Personal details
- Born: Pedro Proença Oliveira Alves García; 3 November 1970 (age 55) Lisbon, Portugal
Refereeing career
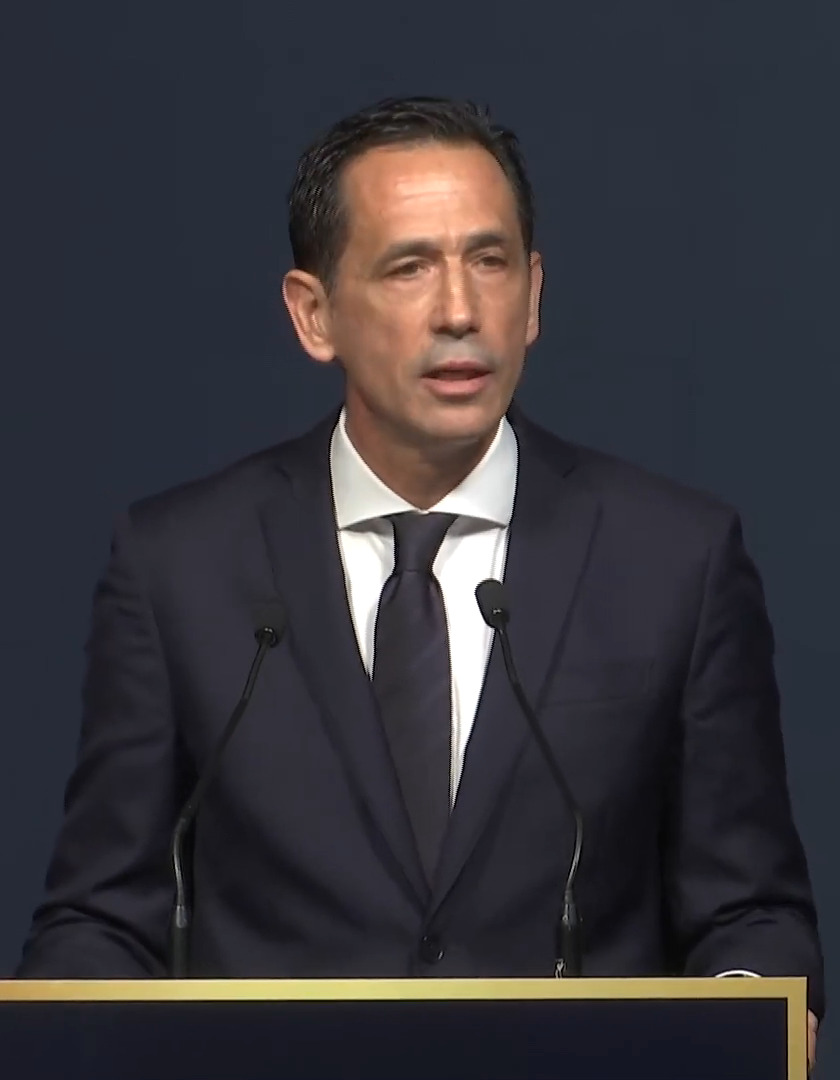
Domestic
Years	League	Role
1998–2015	Portuguese Liga	Referee
International
Years	League	Role
2003–2015	FIFA listed	Referee

Pedro Proença Oliveira Alves García (Portuguese pronunciation: [ˈpeðɾu pɾuˈẽsɐ]; born 3 November 1970) is a Portuguese football official and former referee who has served as the president of the Portuguese Football Federation since February 2025.

Proença refereed several notable matches domestically and internationally, including the Supertaça Cândido de Oliveira, Taça de Portugal finals, Taça da Liga finals, as well as the 2012 finals of both the UEFA Champions League and UEFA European Championship, becoming the first referee to overview both finals of the main European competitions for clubs and national teams in the same year.

In 2006–07, he was named as the Portuguese Referee of the Year. He was promoted to UEFA's Elite category at the start of the 2009–10 season. On 22 June 2011, he was named as "Best Referee" for the 2010–11 season by the Portuguese Football Federation. In January 2013, he was voted by the IFFHS as the Best Referee of 2012.

Proença retired from refereeing in January 2015. In July 2015, six months after retiring from refereeing, he was elected president of the Portuguese Professional Football League, a position he retained until 2025.

== Refereeing career ==
Proença started refereeing in the Portuguese Liga in 1998, being promoted to the FIFA international referee list in 2003.

On 10 August 2003, he officiated the Supertaça Cândido de Oliveira, his first final in Portuguese competitions. The match, which took place at Estádio D. Afonso Henriques, feature Porto and União de Leiria. A year later, he took charge of three matches at the 2004 UEFA Under-19 Championships, including the final between Turkey and Spain.

In December 2004, he officiated his first UEFA Cup match, the second leg of the first round tie between AEK Athens and Gorica. He was appointed to lead the 2007 Taça de Portugal Final, in a match between Sporting CP and Belenenses.

After refereeing qualifying matches in the previous two seasons, he refereed his first UEFA Champions League group stage match in September 2007, a 2–1 win for PSV Eindhoven over CSKA Moscow.

On 22 March 2008, he refereed the final of the first edition of the Taça da Liga. The final was played at the Estádio Algarve in Faro, between Vitória de Setúbal and Sporting CP. Vitória de Setúbal won 3–2 on penalties after a 0–0 draw.

In 2010 he refereed the Taça de Portugal final between Chaves and Porto (2–1). The following year he once again officiated the Taça da Liga final, between Paços de Ferreira and the title holders Benfica. Benfica went on to win 2–1 to take their fourth Taça da Liga in a row.

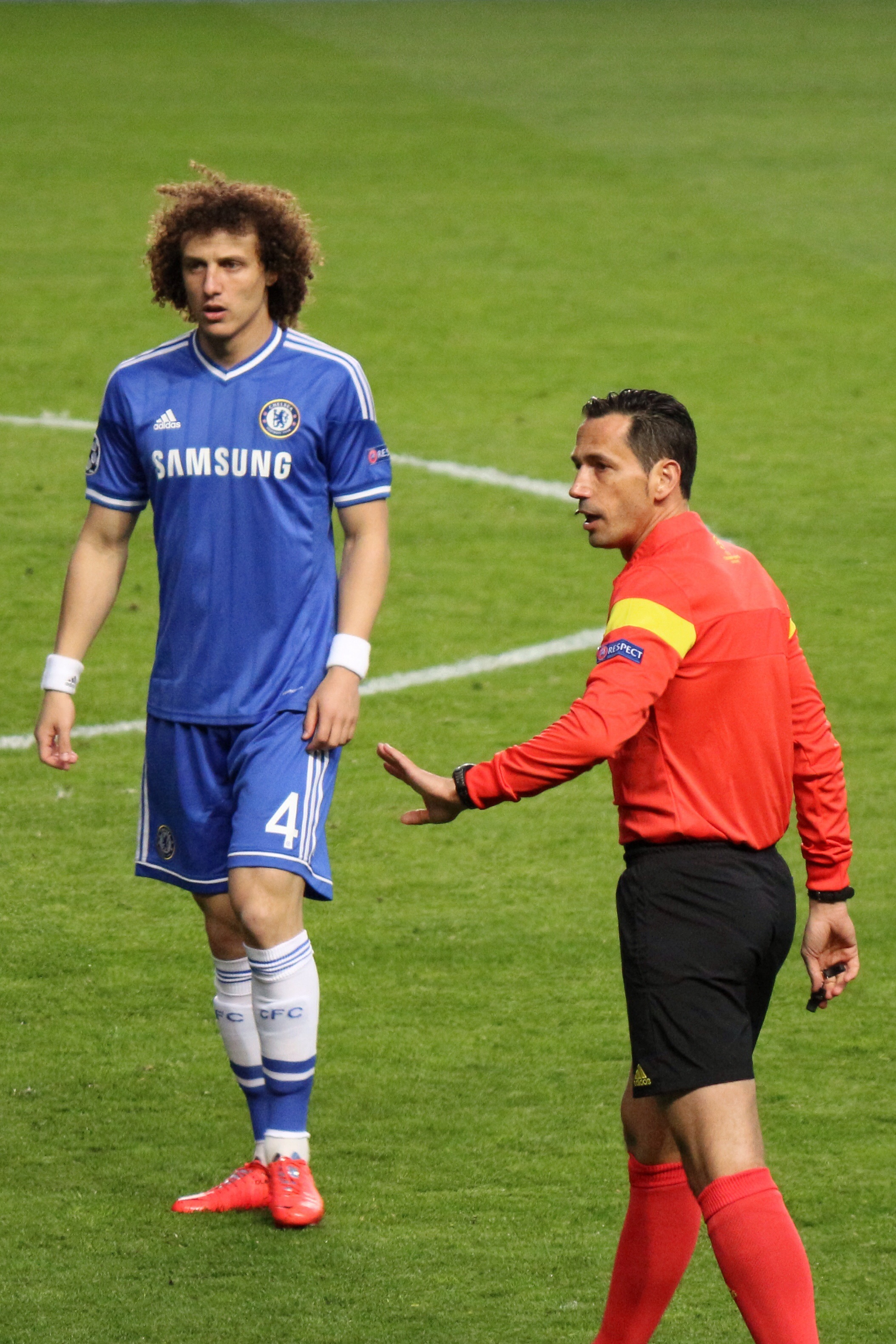
Proença refereeing a UEFA Champions League match between Chelsea and Paris Saint-Germain in 2014

On 13 May 2012, he was chosen to referee the 2012 UEFA Champions League Final, between Chelsea and Bayern Munich.

He was named one of the 12 referees selected by UEFA to take charge of games at the UEFA Euro 2012. He was in charge of the Group C fixture between Spain and Republic of Ireland on 10 June 2012, Group D fixture between Sweden and France on 19 June 2012 and the quarter-final between England and Italy on 24 June 2012. On 29 June 2012, UEFA announced that he would referee the final between Spain and Italy, thus becoming the first Portuguese to referee a European Championship final. Like Howard Webb, who refereed the 2010 FIFA World Cup Final, he also refereed the Champions League final in the same year as taking charge of the final of a major international tournament.

On 22 January 2015, Proença announced his retirement from refereeing.

== Administrative roles ==
On 3 July 2015, he was elected for the UEFA Referees Committee. Later that month, on 28 July, he was elected the new president of the Professional Football League.

On 30 November 2023, Proença was formally appointed President of the European Leagues. He had previously served as a member of the organisation's Board of Directors since 2015. As President, he was nominated as the European Leagues' representative on the UEFA Executive Committee.

In February 2025, he announced his candidacy for the presidency of the Portuguese Football Federation.

== Personal life ==
In the summer of 2011, Proença was assaulted by a Benfica supporter at the Colombo Centre in Lisbon. He was headbutted in the face, leaving him with two broken teeth. Three years later, the aggressor was sentenced to 18 months in prison with suspended sentence.

Proença has one daughter. He was married to Carla Rufino from 2014 to 2021.

== Major matches refereed ==
Date	Match	Tournament	Venue	Result	Ref
19 May 2012	Bayern Munich vs. Chelsea	2012 UEFA Champions League final	Allianz Arena, Munich	1–1 (3–4 on penalties)	
1 July 2012	Spain vs. Italy	UEFA Euro 2012 final	Olympic Stadium, Kyiv	4–0	

== Honours ==
- IFFHS World's Best Referee: 2012

Preceded by (Hungary) Viktor Kassai (2011)	UEFA Champions League Final referee 2012	Succeeded by (Italy) Nicola Rizzoli (2013)
Preceded by (Italy) Roberto Rosetti (2008)	UEFA European Championship Final referee 2012	Succeeded by (England) Mark Clattenburg (2016)
