= 2011–12 Chelsea F.C. season =

English football club season

Chelsea
2011–12 season
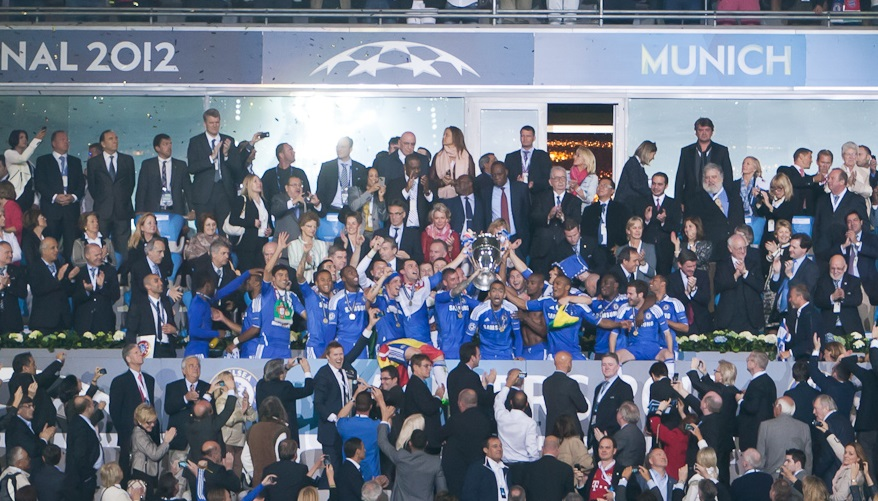
- Chelsea F.C. celebrating winning the 2012 UEFA Champions League Final
- Owner: Roman Abramovich
- Chairman: Bruce Buck
- Manager: André Villas-Boas (until 4 March 2012); Roberto Di Matteo (caretaker manager)
- Stadium: Stamford Bridge
- Premier League: 6th
- FA Cup: Winners
- League Cup: Quarter-finals
- UEFA Champions League: Winners
- Top goalscorer: League: Frank Lampard; Daniel Sturridge (11); All: Frank Lampard (16)
- Highest home attendance: 41,830 vs Tottenham Hotspur (24 March 2012)
- Lowest home attendance: 33,820 vs Bayer Leverkusen (13 September 2011)
Home colours	Away colours	Third colours

The 2011–12 season was Chelsea Football Club's 98th competitive season, their 23rd consecutive season in the top flight of English football (20th in the Premier League), and their 106th year in existence as a football club. While their sixth place in the league was their lowest domestic finish since 2001–02, they completed a cup double by winning their seventh FA Cup and their first UEFA Champions League.

== Kits ==
Supplier: Adidas / Sponsor: Samsung

Home	Home alt.	Home 2012–13	Away	Third

Goalkeeper 1	Goalkeeper alt. 1	Goalkeeper alt. 2	Goalkeeper 2	Goalkeeper 3	Goalkeeper 2012–13

== Key dates ==
- 22 June 2011: André Villas-Boas is appointed as the new manager on a three-year contract, with immediate effect.
- 7 July 2011: Villas-Boas and the rest of the first team squad have their first training of the season together.
- 13 July 2011: Chelsea win their first friendly match against Wycombe Wanderers.
- 26 July 2011: Chelsea confirm Thibaut Courtois, a Belgian goalkeeper, as Villas-Boas' first signing. He is immediately loaned out to Atlético Madrid of La Liga.
- 14 August 2011: Chelsea draw first match of the Premier League season away to Stoke City. It finishes 0–0 on Villas-Boas's debut as Chelsea manager.
- 20 August 2011: Villas-Boas wins his first competitive match as a Chelsea manager after Chelsea defeat West Bromwich Albion 2–1 at Stamford Bridge.
- 22 August 2011: Chelsea and Valencia agree a deal for Juan Mata, who signs for Chelsea for a fee rumoured to be £23.5 million.
- 27 August 2011: Juan Mata scores on his debut match in a 3–1 home victory against Norwich City.
- 27 August 2011: Chelsea and Guadalajara agree a deal for Ulises Dávila. He joins Chelsea on a five-year contract.
- 31 August 2011: The transfer deadline day sees Raul Meireles join from Liverpool, whilst Yossi Benayoun and Patrick van Aanholt depart on seasonal loan deals. France Under-20 international Gaël Kakuta joins Bolton Wanderers on loan until 1 January 2012.
- 18 September 2011: Chelsea suffer their first defeat of the season, losing 1–3 to Manchester United at Old Trafford. Fernando Torres scored Chelsea's goal.
- 29 November 2011: Liverpool knock Chelsea out of the League Cup at the Quarter Final stage, winning 2–0 at Stamford Bridge. The loss is Chelsea's third in four games, and sixth of the season overall.
- 3 December 2011: Manager André Villas-Boas confirms that Nicolas Anelka and Alex have been transfer listed, and banned from training with the first team, after handing in transfer requests to the club. Both will be allowed to resume full training if the transfer does not happen in the January transfer window. The announcement is made after the away match against Newcastle United, which Chelsea win 3–0.
- 6 December 2011: Chelsea win their final Champions League group game against Valencia 3–0 to secure progress to the knockout stages. Racing Genk's 1–1 draw against Bayer Leverkusen means that Chelsea top Group E.
- 12 December 2011: Chelsea become the first team in the 2011–12 edition of the Premier League to defeat leaders Manchester City. Chelsea come from behind in a fiery encounter by goals from Raul Meireles and a late penalty by Frank Lampard to turn the deficit into a victory.
- 4 March 2012: Villas-Boas is sacked and removed of his duties by the director's board following a 0–1 defeat against West Bromwich Albion. Italian first team assistant manager Roberto Di Matteo Is officially appointed as caretaker manager until the end of the season.
- 14 March 2012: Chelsea win their second match in the round of 16 of the UEFA champions league against Napoli with a 5–4 aggregate victory. Branislav Ivanović scores the winner in extra time to secure a spot in the quarter-finals. Following defeat of Arsenal by Milan and defeats of the Manchester clubs in their respective Europa League ties, Chelsea becomes the only remaining English representative in all European competitions.
- 18 March 2012: Chelsea progress to the FA Cup semi-finals for a fifth time in seven years after beating Leicester City 5–2 at Stamford Bridge. Fernando Torres was the man of the match with two goals and two assists.
- 4 April 2012: Chelsea progress to the Champions League semi-finals for the sixth time in the past nine seasons after beating Benfica 3–1 on aggregate.
- 15 April 2012: Chelsea progress to the FA Cup final for the third time in four seasons, courtesy of a 5–1 win against Tottenham Hotspur. Controversy over Chelsea's second goal by Juan Mata adds to calls for goal-line technology.
- 24 April 2012: Chelsea progress to the Champions League final in spectacular fashion, drawing 2–2 with Barcelona at Camp Nou despite playing with ten men for more than two-thirds of the game. Chelsea win 3–2 on aggregate.
- 28 April 2012: Chelsea agree personal terms with Werder Bremen's Marko Marin. He is set to join in the summer.
- 5 May 2012: Chelsea win the FA Cup for the seventh time after beating Liverpool 2–1 in the Final. Didier Drogba scores in his fourth FA Cup Final – a new record.
- 19 May 2012: Chelsea win their first Champions League title, defeating Bayern Munich on penalties after a 1–1 draw in the Final. In doing so, Chelsea becomes the 22nd club to win the European Cup, the fifth English team and the first team from London to win the trophy.

== Club ==
=== Coaching staff ===
Position	Staff
Manager	(Portugal) Andre Villas Boas (until 4 March 2012)
Caretaker manager	(Italy) Roberto Di Matteo (from 4 March 2012)
Assistant manager	(England) Steve Holland
Assistant manager	(Italy) Roberto Di Matteo (until 4 March 2012)
Assistant manager	(England) Eddie Newton (from 5 March 2012)
Technical Director	(Nigeria) Michael Emenalo
Goalkeeper Coach	(France) Christophe Lollichon
First Team Fitness Coach	(Portugal) Jose Mario Rocha (until 4 March 2012)
Assistant First Team Fitness Coach	(England) Chris Jones
Head Opposition Scout	(Portugal) Daniel Sousa (until 4 March 2012)
Senior Opposition Scout	(England) Mick McGiven
Medical Director	(Spain) Paco Biosca
First team doctor	(Gibraltar) Eva Carneiro
Reserve Team Manager	(England) Dermot Drummy
Youth Team Manager	(England) Adi Viveash
Academy Manager	(England) Neil Bath
Match Analyst	(England) James Melbourne

=== Other information ===
Owner	(Russia) Roman Abramovich
Chairman	(United States) Bruce Buck
Chief Executive	(England) Ron Gourlay
Director	(Ukraine) Eugene Tenenbaum
Ground (capacity and dimensions)	Stamford Bridge (41,837 / 103x67 metres)
Training ground	Cobham Training Centre

== Squads ==
=== First team squad ===
No.	Name	Nationality	Position (s)	Date of Birth (Age)	Signed from
Goalkeepers
1	Petr Čech	(Czech Republic)	GK	20 May 1982 (aged 30)	(France) Rennes
22	Ross Turnbull	(England)	GK	4 January 1985 (aged 27)	(England) Middlesbrough
40	Henrique Hilário	(Portugal)	GK	21 October 1975 (aged 36)	(Portugal) Nacional
Defenders
2	Branislav Ivanović	(Serbia)	RB / CB	22 February 1984 (aged 28)	(Russia) Lokomotiv Moscow
3	Ashley Cole	(England)	LB	20 December 1980 (aged 31)	(England) Arsenal
4	David Luiz	(Brazil)	CB	22 April 1987 (aged 25)	(Portugal) Benfica
17	José Bosingwa	(Portugal)	RB / LB	24 August 1982 (aged 29)	(Portugal) Porto
19	Paulo Ferreira	(Portugal)	RB / LB	18 January 1979 (aged 33)	(Portugal) Porto
24	Gary Cahill	(England)	CB	19 December 1985 (aged 26)	(England) Bolton Wanderers
26	John Terry (C)	(England)	CB	7 December 1980 (aged 31)	(England) Chelsea Academy
27	Sam Hutchinson	(England)	RB / CB	3 August 1989 (aged 22)	(England) Chelsea Academy
34	Ryan Bertrand	(England)	LB / LW	5 August 1989 (aged 22)	(England) Chelsea Academy
Midfielders
5	Michael Essien	(Ghana)	CM / DM	3 December 1982 (aged 29)	(France) Lyon
6	Oriol Romeu	(Spain)	DM / CM	24 September 1991 (aged 20)	(Spain) Barcelona
7	Ramires	(Brazil)	CM / RM	24 March 1987 (aged 25)	(Portugal) Benfica
8	Frank Lampard (VC)	(England)	CM	20 June 1978 (aged 33)	(England) West Ham United
10	Juan Mata	(Spain)	LW / RW / AM	23 April 1988 (aged 24)	(Spain) Valencia
12	Mikel John Obi	(Nigeria)	DM / CM	22 April 1987 (aged 25)	(Norway) Lyn
15	Florent Malouda	(France)	LW / CM	13 June 1980 (aged 31)	(France) Lyon
16	Raul Meireles	(Portugal)	CM / DM	17 March 1983 (aged 29)	(England) Liverpool
20	Josh McEachran	(England)	CM	1 March 1993 (aged 19)	(England) Chelsea Academy
Forwards
9	Fernando Torres	(Spain)	ST	20 March 1984 (aged 28)	(England) Liverpool
11	Didier Drogba	(Ivory Coast)	ST	11 March 1978 (aged 34)	(France) Marseille
18	Romelu Lukaku	(Belgium)	ST	13 May 1993 (aged 19)	(Belgium) Anderlecht
21	Salomon Kalou	(Ivory Coast)	RW / LW / ST	5 August 1985 (aged 26)	(Netherlands) Feyenoord
23	Daniel Sturridge	(England)	RW / LW / ST	1 September 1989 (aged 22)	(England) Manchester City

=== Premier League squad ===
Note: Flags indicate national team as defined under FIFA eligibility rules; some limited exceptions apply. Players may hold more than one non-FIFA nationality.

No.	Pos.	Nation	Player
1	GK	CZE	Petr Čech
2	DF	SRB	Branislav Ivanović
3	DF	ENG	Ashley Cole ^{HG}
4	DF	BRA	David Luiz
5	MF	GHA	Michael Essien
6	MF	ESP	Oriol Romeu ^{U21}
7	MF	BRA	Ramires
8	MF	ENG	Frank Lampard ^{HG}
9	FW	ESP	Fernando Torres
10	MF	ESP	Juan Mata
11	FW	CIV	Didier Drogba
12	MF	NGR	Mikel John Obi
15	MF	FRA	Florent Malouda
16	MF	POR	Raul Meireles
17	DF	POR	José Bosingwa

No.	Pos.	Nation	Player
18	FW	BEL	Romelu Lukaku ^{U21}
19	DF	POR	Paulo Ferreira
20	MF	ENG	Josh McEachran ^{U21}
21	FW	CIV	Salomon Kalou
22	GK	ENG	Ross Turnbull ^{HG}
23	FW	ENG	Daniel Sturridge ^{HG}
24	DF	ENG	Gary Cahill ^{HG}
26	DF	ENG	John Terry ^{HG} (Captain)
27	DF	ENG	Sam Hutchinson ^{HG}
34	DF	ENG	Ryan Bertrand ^{HG}
35	MF	BRA	Lucas Piazon ^{U21}
40	GK	POR	Henrique Hilário
45	DF	ENG	Nathaniel Chalobah ^{U21}
46	GK	ENG	Jamal Blackman ^{U21}

- HG = Home Grown Player
- U21 = Under 21 Player

Source: 2011–12 Premier League squad

=== Reserve team ===
Note: Flags indicate national team as defined under FIFA eligibility rules; some limited exceptions apply. Players may hold more than one non-FIFA nationality.

No.	Pos.	Nation	Player
27	DF	ENG	Sam Hutchinson
35	MF	BRA	Lucas Piazon
45	DF	ENG	Nathaniel Chalobah
47	DF	ENG	Billy Clifford
48	MF	IRL	Conor Clifford
49	DF	ENG	Aziz Deen-Conteh

No.	Pos.	Nation	Player
51	DF	ENG	Rohan Ince
53	FW	SWE	Marko Mitrović
54	DF	ENG	Todd Kane
56	MF	ENG	George Saville
58	DF	GHA	Daniel Pappoe
–	FW	ENG	Adam Phillip

=== UEFA Champions League squad ===
Note: Flags indicate national team as defined under FIFA eligibility rules; some limited exceptions apply. Players may hold more than one non-FIFA nationality.

No.	Pos.	Nation	Player
1	GK	CZE	Petr Čech
2	DF	SRB	Branislav Ivanović
3	DF	ENG	Ashley Cole ^{HG^{1}}
4	DF	BRA	David Luiz
5	MF	GHA	Michael Essien
6	MF	ESP	Oriol Romeu
7	MF	BRA	Ramires
8	MF	ENG	Frank Lampard ^{HG^{1}} (Vice-Captain)
9	FW	ESP	Fernando Torres
10	MF	ESP	Juan Mata
11	FW	CIV	Didier Drogba
12	MF	NGR	Mikel John Obi
15	MF	FRA	Florent Malouda
16	MF	POR	Raul Meireles
17	DF	POR	José Bosingwa
19	DF	POR	Paulo Ferreira
20	MF	ENG	Josh McEachran ^{B}
21	FW	CIV	Salomon Kalou
22	GK	ENG	Ross Turnbull ^{HG^{1}}

No.	Pos.	Nation	Player
23	FW	ENG	Daniel Sturridge ^{HG^{1}}
24	DF	ENG	Gary Cahill ^{HG^{1}}
26	DF	ENG	John Terry ^{HG^{2}} (Captain)
34	DF	ENG	Ryan Bertrand ^{HG^{2}}
40	GK	POR	Henrique Hilário
45	DF	ENG	Nathaniel Chalobah ^{B}
46	GK	ENG	Jamal Blackman ^{B}
47	DF	ENG	Billy Clifford ^{B}
48	MF	IRL	Conor Clifford ^{B}
49	DF	ENG	Aziz Deen-Conteh ^{B}
51	DF	ENG	Rohan Ince ^{B}
53	MF	SWE	Marko Mitrović ^{B}
54	DF	ENG	Todd Kane ^{B}
55	MF	ENG	James Ashton ^{B}
56	MF	ENG	George Saville ^{B}
57	DF	ENG	Archange Nkumu ^{B}
58	DF	GHA	Daniel Pappoe ^{B}
60	GK	WAL	Rhys Taylor ^{B}

- B = List B Player
- HG^{1} = Association-trained player
- HG^{2} = Club-trained player

Source: 2011–12 UEFA Champions League squad

== Transfers ==
=== In ===
==== Summer ====
No.	Pos	Player	Transferred From	Fee	Date	Source
—	GK	(Belgium) Thibaut Courtois	(Belgium) Genk	€9 million	26 July 2011	
6	MF	(Spain) Oriol Romeu	(Spain) Barcelona	€5 million	4 August 2011	
18	FW	(Belgium) Romelu Lukaku	(Belgium) Anderlecht	€12 million	18 August 2011	
10	MF	(Spain) Juan Mata	(Spain) Valencia	£23.5 million	22 August 2011	
—	MF	(Mexico) Ulises Dávila	(Mexico) Guadalajara	£1.75 million	27 August 2011	
16	MF	(Portugal) Raul Meireles	(England) Liverpool	£12 million	31 August 2011	

==== Winter ====
No.	Pos	Player	Transferred From	Fee	Date	Source
27	DF	(England) Sam Hutchinson	Comeback	Free transfer	1 December 2011	
—	DF	(Nigeria) Kenneth Omeruo	(Belgium) Standard Liège	Undisclosed	6 January 2012	
24	DF	(England) Gary Cahill	(England) Bolton Wanderers	£7 million	16 January 2012	
35	MF	(Brazil) Lucas Piazon	(Brazil) São Paulo	€7.5 million	20 January 2012	
—	FW	(England) Patrick Bamford	(England) Nottingham Forest	£1 million	31 January 2012	
—	MF	(Belgium) Kevin De Bruyne	(Belgium) Genk	£6.7 million	31 January 2012	

=== Out ===
==== Summer ====
No.	Pos	Player	Transferred To	Fee	Date	Source
—	FW	(England) Bobby Devyne	(England) Chesham United	Free transfer	30 June 2011	
45	FW	(Italy) Fabio Borini	(Italy) Parma	€360,000	1 July 2011	
42	DF	(England) Michael Mancienne	(Germany) Hamburger SV	£3 million	1 July 2011	
24	MF	(Serbia) Nemanja Matić	(Portugal) Benfica	Free transfer*	1 July 2011	
60	MF	(England) Danny Philliskirk	(England) Sheffield United	Free transfer	1 July 2011	
—	MF	(Republic of Ireland) Anton Rodgers	(England) Brighton & Hove Albion	Free transfer	1 July 2011	
55	MF	(Italy) Jacopo Sala	(Germany) Hamburger SV	€100,000	1 July 2011	
—	DF	(England) Ben Sampayo	(England) Brighton & Hove Albion	Free transfer	1 July 2011	
61	GK	(Czech Republic) Jan Šebek	(Czech Republic) Baumit Jablonec	Free transfer	1 July 2011	
63	MF	(Turkey) Gökhan Töre	(Germany) Hamburger SV	€1.3 million	1 July 2011	
59	MF	(England) Michael Woods	(England) Yeovil Town	Free transfer	1 July 2011	
—	MF	(England) Jack Cork	(England) Southampton	£750,000	7 July 2011	
18	MF	(Russia) Yuri Zhirkov	(Russia) Anzhi Makhachkala	€15 million	6 August 2011	
—	DF	(Serbia) Slobodan Rajković	(Germany) Hamburger SV	£1.75 million	24 August 2011	

==== Winter ====
No.	Pos	Player	Transferred To	Fee	Date	Source
—	MF	(Portugal) Mesca	(England) Fulham	Free transfer	20 September 2011	
39	FW	(France) Nicolas Anelka	(China) Shanghai Shenhua	Undisclosed	1 January 2012	
—	DF	(Northern Ireland) Carl Magnay	(England) Gateshead	Free transfer	1 January 2012	
33	DF	(Brazil) Alex	(France) Paris Saint-Germain	£4.2 million	27 January 2012	
50	MF	(Portugal) Kaby	(Cyprus) AEL Limassol	Free transfer	27 January 2012	
59	FW	(Austria) Philipp Prosenik	(Italy) Milan	Undisclosed	31 January 2012	
52	MF	(England) Jacob Mellis	(England) Barnsley	Free transfer	20 March 2012	

=== Loan out ===
No.	Pos	Player	Loaned To	Start	End	Loan Fee	Source
43	DF	(Netherlands) Jeffrey Bruma	(Germany) Hamburger SV	1 July 2011	30 June 2012	€500,000	
54	GK	(England) Sam Walker	(England) Northampton Town	11 July 2011	23 December 2011	Free	
—	GK	(Belgium) Thibaut Courtois	(Spain) Atlético Madrid	26 July 2011	30 June 2012	Free	
—	DF	(England) Ben Gordon	(England) Peterborough United	17 August 2011	24 September 2011	Free	
64	FW	(Slovakia) Milan Lalkovič	(England) Doncaster Rovers	18 August 2011	15 October 2011	Free	
—	DF	(Czech Republic) Tomáš Kalas	(Netherlands) Vitesse	22 August 2011	30 June 2012	Free	
—	FW	(Mexico) Ulises Dávila	(Netherlands) Vitesse	30 August 2011	30 June 2012	Free	
30	MF	(Israel) Yossi Benayoun	(England) Arsenal	31 August 2011	31 May 2012	Free	
44	FW	(France) Gaël Kakuta	(England) Bolton Wanderers	31 August 2011	1 January 2012	Free	
38	DF	(Netherlands) Patrick van Aanholt	(England) Wigan Athletic	31 August 2011	6 January 2012	Free	
—	GK	(Croatia) Matej Delač	(Czech Republic) České Budějovice	13 September 2011	30 June 2012	Free	
48	MF	(Republic of Ireland) Conor Clifford	(England) Yeovil Town	4 November 2011	3 January 2012	Free	
60	GK	(Wales) Rhys Taylor	(England) Rotherham United	2 January 2012	5 May 2012	Free	
—	DF	(Nigeria) Kenneth Omeruo	(Netherlands) ADO Den Haag	7 January 2012	30 June 2013	Free	
—	DF	(England) Ben Gordon	(Scotland) Kilmarnock	11 January 2012	31 May 2012	Free	
44	FW	(France) Gaël Kakuta	(France) Dijon	11 January 2012	30 June 2012	Free	
20	MF	(England) Josh McEachran	(Wales) Swansea City	15 January 2012	31 May 2012	Free	
38	DF	(Netherlands) Patrick van Aanholt	(Netherlands) Vitesse	16 January 2012	30 June 2012	Free	
—	GK	(England) Sam Walker	(England) Yeovil Town	19 January 2012	31 May 2012	Free	
—	MF	(Belgium) Kevin De Bruyne	(Belgium) Genk	31 January 2012	30 June 2012	Free	
64	FW	(Slovakia) Milan Lalkovič	(Netherlands) ADO Den Haag	31 January 2012	11 April 2012	Free	

=== Overall transfer activity ===
==== Spending ====
Summer: ▼£60 million

Winter: ▼£21.2+ million

Total: ▼£81.2 million

==== Income ====
Summer: ▲£20.65 million

Winter: ▲£4.2+ million

Total: ▲£24.85 million

==== Expenditure ====
Summer: ▼£39.35 million

Winter: ▼£17 million

Total: ▼£56.35 million

== Competitions ==
=== Overview ===
Competition	Started round	Final position / round	First match	Last match
Premier League	—	6th	14 August 2011	13 May 2012
FA Cup	3rd round	Winners	8 January 2012	5 May 2012
Football League Cup	3rd round	Quarterfinal	21 September 2011	29 November 2011
UEFA Champions League	Group stage	Winners	13 September 2011	19 May 2012

=== Pre-season and friendlies ===
12 July 2011	Chelsea	3–0	Wycombe Wanderers	Cobham
	Benayoun 4'; Torres 52'; Rajković 56'	Report		Stadium: Cobham Training Centre; Attendance: None (Behind closed doors); Referee: Phil Dowd

16 July 2011	Portsmouth	0–1	Chelsea	Portsmouth
15:00 BST		Report	Ben Haim 7' (o.g.); Hilário (yellow card) 60'; Benayoun (yellow card) 87'	Stadium: Fratton Park; Attendance: 19,345; Referee: Keith Stroud

21 July 2011	Malaysia XI	0–1	(England) Chelsea	Kuala Lumpur, Malaysia
13:45 BST		Report	Drogba 81'	Stadium: Bukit Jalil Stadium; Attendance: 84,980; Referee: Subkhiddin Mohd Salleh

24 July 2011	Thailand XI	0–4	(England) Chelsea	Bangkok, Thailand
11:45 BST	Florent (yellow card) 88'	(Report)	Lampard 37'; Bosingwa 49'; Ivanović 51'; Malouda 72'	Stadium: Rajamangala National Stadium; Attendance: 50,000; Referee: Apisit Aonrak

6 August 2011	Rangers (Scotland)	1–3	(England) Chelsea	Glasgow, Scotland
15:00 BST	Jelavić 6'	Report	Sturridge 21', 29'; Malouda 71'	Stadium: Ibrox Stadium; Attendance: 47,379; Referee: Craig Thomson

==== Barclays Asia Trophy ====
27 July 2011 Semi-Final	Kitchee (Hong Kong)	0–4	(England) Chelsea	Hong Kong
13:30 BST		Report	Lampard 38' (pen.); Luzardo 50' (o.g.); Drogba 61'; Sturridge 78'	Stadium: Hong Kong Stadium; Attendance: 33,967; Referee: Phil Dowd

30 July 2011 Final	Chelsea (England)	2–0	(England) Aston Villa	Hong Kong
13:30 BST	McEachran 1'; Torres 59'; Malouda (yellow card) 90+2'	Report	Albrighton (yellow card) 28'	Stadium: Hong Kong Stadium; Attendance: 38,911; Referee: Mike Dean

=== Premier League ===
==== League table ====
Pos	Team	Pld	W	D	L	GF	GA	GD	Pts	Qualification or relegation
4	Tottenham Hotspur	38	20	9	9	66	41	+25	69	Qualification for the Europa League group stage (Note: Chelsea won the Champions League and thus qualified for the group stage as defending champions, forfeiting their spot in the Europa League as the FA Cup winners. This meant that Tottenham were to compete in the Europa League group stage, since, pursuant to the rules, only four clubs from the Premier League could play in the Champions League.)
5	Newcastle United	38	19	8	11	56	51	+5	65	Qualification for the Europa League play-off round
6	Chelsea	38	18	10	10	65	46	+19	64	Qualification for the Champions League group stage
7	Everton	38	15	11	12	50	40	+10	56	
8	Liverpool	38	14	10	14	47	40	+7	52	Qualification for the Europa League third qualifying round (Note: Liverpool won the League Cup and thus qualified for the Europa League third qualifying round.)

Source: Barclays Premier League
Rules for classification: 1) points; 2) goal difference; 3) number of goals scored.

==== Results summary ====
Overall								Home						Away					
Pld	W	D	L	GF	GA	GD	Pts	W	D	L	GF	GA	GD	W	D	L	GF	GA	GD
38	18	10	10	65	46	+19	64	12	3	4	41	24	+17	6	7	6	24	22	+2

==== Results by round ====
Round	1	2	3	4	5	6	7	8	9	10	11	12	13	14	15	16	17	18	19	20	21	22	23	24	25	26	27	28	29	30	31	32	33	34	35	36	37	38
Ground	A	H	H	A	A	H	A	H	A	H	A	H	H	A	H	A	A	H	H	A	H	A	A	H	A	H	A	H	A	H	A	H	A	A	H	H	A	H
Result	D	W	W	W	L	W	W	W	L	L	W	L	W	W	W	D	D	D	L	W	W	D	D	D	L	W	L	W	L	D	W	W	D	D	W	L	L	W
Position	11	6	4	3	3	3	3	3	3	4	4	5	5	4	3	4	4	4	5	4	4	4	4	4	5	5	5	5	5	5	5	5	6	6	6	6	6	6
Points	1	4	7	10	10	13	16	19	19	19	22	22	25	28	31	32	33	34	34	37	40	41	42	43	43	46	46	49	49	50	53	56	57	58	61	61	61	64

A = Away; H = Home; W = Win; D = Draw; L = Loss

==== Matches ====
14 August 2011 1	Stoke City	0–0	Chelsea	Stoke-on-Trent
13:30 BST	Shawcross (yellow card) 10'; Wilson (yellow card) 80'	Report	(yellow card) 66' Cole; (yellow card) 88' Lampard	Stadium: Britannia Stadium; Attendance: 27,412; Referee: Mark Halsey

20 August 2011 2	Chelsea	2–1	West Bromwich Albion	London
17:30 BST	Lampard (yellow card) 23'; Anelka 53'; Malouda 83'; Terry (yellow card) 90'	Report	4' Long; (yellow card) 7' Tamaș; (yellow card) 45' Mulumbu; (yellow card) 60' Olsson; (yellow card) 90+2' Odemwingie	Stadium: Stamford Bridge; Attendance: 41,091; Referee: Lee Mason

27 August 2011 3	Chelsea	3–1	Norwich City	London
15:00 BST	Bosingwa 5', (yellow card) 35'; Torres (yellow card) 56'; Lampard 82' (pen.); Mata 90+9'	Report	(yellow card) 41' Crofts; (yellow card) 59' Naughton; 63' Holt; (red card) 80' Ruddy	Stadium: Stamford Bridge; Attendance: 41,765; Referee: Jones

10 September 2011 4	Sunderland	1–2	Chelsea	Sunderland
15:00 BST	Colback (yellow card) 23'; Ji 90+1'	Report	18' Terry; 50' Sturridge; (yellow card) 90+2' Bosingwa	Stadium: Stadium of Light; Attendance: 36,699; Referee: Lee Probert

18 September 2011 5	Manchester United	3–1	Chelsea	Manchester
16:00 BST	Smalling 8'; Nani 37'; Rooney 45'; Valencia (yellow card) 80'; Fletcher (yellow card) 85'	Report	47' Torres; (yellow card) 49' Ramires; (yellow card) 56' Terry; (yellow card) 78' Cole	Stadium: Old Trafford; Attendance: 75,455; Referee: Phil Dowd

24 September 2011 6	Chelsea	4–1	Swansea City	London
15:00 BST	Torres 29', (red card) 38'; Mata (yellow card) 32'; Ramires 35', 71'; Cole (yellow card) 85'; Mikel (yellow card) 90+3'; Drogba 90+3'	Report	(yellow card) 53' Dyer; 85' Williams; (yellow card) 88' Taylor	Stadium: Stamford Bridge; Attendance: 41,800; Referee: Mike Dean

2 October 2011 7	Bolton Wanderers	1–5	Chelsea	Bolton
13:30 BST	Ngog (yellow card) 10'; Boyata 46'	Report	2', 25' Sturridge; 15', 27', 59' Lampard; (yellow card) 61' David Luiz; (yellow card) 78' Terry	Stadium: Reebok Stadium; Attendance: 24,657; Referee: Peter Walton

15 October 2011 8	Chelsea	3–1	Everton	London
17:30 BST	Sturridge 31' (yellow card) 70'; Cole (yellow card) 37'; Terry 45+2'; Ramires 61'	Report	(yellow card) 16' Fellaini; (yellow card) 42' Baines; 81' Vellios	Stadium: Stamford Bridge; Attendance: 41,789; Referee: Mike Jones

23 October 2011 9	Queens Park Rangers	1–0	Chelsea	London
16:00 BST	Helguson 10' (pen.); Derry (yellow card) 52'; Barton (yellow card) 59'	Report	(red card) 32' Bosingwa; (red card) 41' Drogba; (yellow card) 50' Mikel; (yellow card) 52' Lampard; (yellow card) 58' Ivanović; (yellow card) 70' David Luiz; (yellow card) 72' Meireles; (yellow card) 76' Cole; (yellow card) 90' Terry	Stadium: Loftus Road; Attendance: 18,050; Referee: Chris Foy

29 October 2011 10	Chelsea	3–5	Arsenal	London
12:45 BST	Lampard 14'; Terry 44'; Ivanović (yellow card) 79'; Mata 80'; Meireles (yellow card) 90+2'	Report	37', 85', 90+2' (yellow card) 78' Van Persie; 49' Santos; (yellow card) 50' Szczęsny; 55' Walcott; (yellow card) 90+1' Song	Stadium: Stamford Bridge; Attendance: 41,801; Referee: Andre Marriner

5 November 2011 11	Blackburn Rovers	0–1	Chelsea	Blackburn
15:00 GMT	Lowe (yellow card) 55'; Hanley (yellow card) 70'; Givet (yellow card) 76'; Pedersen (yellow card) 79'	Report	51' Lampard; (yellow card) 76' Sturridge; (yellow card) 89' Meireles	Stadium: Ewood Park; Attendance: 21,985; Referee: Mike Dean

20 November 2011 12	Chelsea	1–2	Liverpool	London
16:00 GMT	David Luiz (yellow card) 41'; Sturridge 54'; Ramires (yellow card) 62'; Ivanović (yellow card) 79'	Report	(yellow card) 29' Lucas; 33' Rodríguez; (yellow card) 64' Kuyt; 87' G. Johnson	Stadium: Stamford Bridge; Attendance: 41,820; Referee: Lee Probert

26 November 2011 13	Chelsea	3–0	Wolverhampton Wanderers	London
15:00 GMT	Terry 7', (yellow card) 89'; Sturridge 29'; Mata 45'	Report	(yellow card) 16' Edwards; (yellow card) 34' Henry	Stadium: Stamford Bridge; Attendance: 41,648; Referee: Lee Mason

3 December 2011 14	Newcastle United	0–3	Chelsea	Newcastle upon Tyne
12:45 GMT	Simpson (yellow card) 89'; R. Taylor (yellow card) 90+3'	Report	(yellow card) 4' David Luiz; 38' Drogba; (yellow card) 85', (goal) 90+2' Sturridge; 89' Kalou; (yellow card) 90+4' Terry	Stadium: St James' Park; Attendance: 52,305; Referee: Mike Dean

12 December 2011 15	Chelsea	2–1	Manchester City	London
20:00 GMT	Meireles 35', (yellow card) 36'; Romeu (yellow card) 64'; Ramires (yellow card) 75'; Drogba (yellow card) 78'; Lampard 82' (pen.)	Report	2' Balotelli; (yellow card) 41' Kompany; (yellow card) 47' (yellow-red card) 58' Clichy	Stadium: Stamford Bridge; Attendance: 41,730; Referee: Mark Clattenburg

17 December 2011 16	Wigan Athletic	1–1	Chelsea	Wigan
17:30 GMT	Gómez 88'	Report	59' Sturridge	Stadium: DW Stadium; Attendance: 18,320; Referee: Martin Atkinson

22 December 2011 17	Tottenham Hotspur	1–1	Chelsea	London
20:00 GMT	Adebayor 8', (yellow card) 19'; Bale (yellow card) 70'	Report	(yellow card) 12' Ivanović; 23' Sturridge; (yellow card) 42' Ramires	Stadium: White Hart Lane; Attendance: 36,141; Referee: Howard Webb

26 December 2011 18	Chelsea	1–1	Fulham	London
13:00 GMT	Mata 47'; Bosingwa (yellow card) 68'	Report	(yellow card) 7', (goal) 55' Dempsey	Stadium: Stamford Bridge; Attendance: 41,548; Referee: Kevin Friend

31 December 2011 19	Chelsea	1–3	Aston Villa	London
15:00 GMT	Drogba 23' (pen.); Terry (yellow card) 32'	Report	28' Ireland; (yellow card) 67' Cuéllar; 83' Petrov; 85' Bent	Stadium: Stamford Bridge; Attendance: 41,332; Referee: Mark Halsey

2 January 2012 20	Wolverhampton Wanderers	1–2	Chelsea	Wolverhampton
15:00 GMT	Hammill (yellow card) 26'; Henry (yellow card) 27'; Doyle (yellow card) 31'; Ward 84'	Report	Lampard (yellow card) 25', (goal) 89'; Romeu (yellow card) 33'; Ramires 54'	Stadium: Molineux; Attendance: 27,289; Referee: Peter Walton

14 January 2012 21	Chelsea	1–0	Sunderland	London
15:00 GMT	David Luiz (yellow card) 8'; Lampard 13'; Torres (yellow card) 66'; Meireles (yellow card) 73'	Report	Cattermole (yellow card) 59'	Stadium: Stamford Bridge; Attendance: 41,696; Referee: Phil Dowd

21 January 2012 22	Norwich City	0–0	Chelsea	Norwich
15:00 GMT		Report		Stadium: Carrow Road; Attendance: 26,792; Referee: Mark Clattenburg

31 January 2012 23	Swansea City	1–1	Chelsea	Swansea
19:45 GMT	Taylor (yellow card) 14'; Sinclair 40'; Rangel (yellow card) 48'	Report	Malouda (yellow card) 45+2'; Cole (yellow card) 45' (yellow-red card) 86'; Meireles (yellow card) 87'; Taylor 90+3' (o.g.)	Stadium: Liberty Stadium; Attendance: 20,526; Referee: André Marriner

5 February 2012 24	Chelsea	3–3	Manchester United	London
16:00 GMT	Torres (yellow card) 31'; Evans 33' (o.g.); Ivanović (yellow card) 45+1'; Mata 49'; David Luiz 54'	Report	Evra (yellow card) 50'; Rooney 57' (pen.), 69' (pen.); Hernández 84'	Stadium: Stamford Bridge; Attendance: 41,668; Referee: Howard Webb

11 February 2012 25	Everton	2–0	Chelsea	Liverpool
15:00 GMT	Pienaar 5'; Stracqualursi 71'	Report	Meireles (yellow card) 42'; Bosingwa (yellow card) 52'; Torres (yellow card) 59'	Stadium: Goodison Park; Attendance: 33,924; Referee: Mike Jones

25 February 2012 26	Chelsea	3–0	Bolton Wanderers	London
15:00 GMT	David Luiz 48'; Drogba 61'; Lampard 79'	Report	Pratley (yellow card) 43'	Stadium: Stamford Bridge; Attendance: 40,999; Referee: Michael Oliver

3 March 2012 27	West Bromwich Albion	1–0	Chelsea	West Bromwich
15:00 GMT	Ridgewell (yellow card) 66'; Andrews (yellow card) 79'; McAuley 82'	Report	Cole (yellow card) 85'	Stadium: The Hawthorns; Attendance: 24,838; Referee: Phil Dowd

10 March 2012 28	Chelsea	1–0	Stoke City	London
15:00 GMT	Mikel (yellow card) 18'; Drogba 67'	Report	Diao (yellow card) 13'; Fuller (red card) 24'; Wilson (yellow card) 37'	Stadium: Stamford Bridge; Attendance: 40,945; Referee: Andre Marriner

21 March 2012 29	Manchester City	2–1	Chelsea	Manchester
19:45 GMT	Agüero 78' (pen.); Nasri 85', (yellow card) 88'	Report	Mata (yellow card) 44'; Lampard (yellow card) 58'; Cahill 60'	Stadium: City of Manchester Stadium; Attendance: 46,324; Referee: Mike Dean

24 March 2012 30	Chelsea	0–0	Tottenham Hotspur	London
12:30 GMT	Essien (yellow card) 50'	Report	Assou-Ekotto (yellow card) 65'; Sandro (yellow card) 66'	Stadium: Stamford Bridge; Attendance: 41,830; Referee: Martin Atkinson

31 March 2012 31	Aston Villa	2–4	Chelsea	Birmingham
15:00 GMT	Warnock (yellow card) 44'; Collins 77'; Lichaj 80'	Report	Sturridge 9'; Ivanović 50', 86'; Torres 90+4'	Stadium: Villa Park; Attendance: 34,740; Referee: Lee Mason

7 April 2012 32	Chelsea	2–1	Wigan Athletic	London
15:00 BST	Essien (yellow card) 22'; Malouda (yellow card) 53'; Ivanović 62'; Mata 90'	Report	Maloney (yellow card) 61'; Figueroa (yellow card) 65'; Diame 82'	Stadium: Stamford Bridge; Attendance: 40,651; Referee: Mike Jones

9 April 2012 33	Fulham	1–1	Chelsea	London
20:00 BST	Murphy (yellow card) 63'; Dempsey 82'	Report	(yellow card) 24' Meireles; (yellow card) 41' Cahill; 45' (pen.) Lampard; (yellow card) 58' Mikel	Stadium: Craven Cottage; Attendance: 25,697; Referee: Mark Clattenburg

21 April 2012 34	Arsenal	0–0	Chelsea	London
12:45 BST	Rosický (yellow card) 30'; Van Persie (yellow card) 50'; Diaby (yellow card) 76'	Report	(yellow card) 49' Malouda; (yellow card) 54' Cahill; (yellow card) 72' Bosingwa; (yellow card) 81' Cole	Stadium: Emirates Stadium; Attendance: 60,111; Referee: Dean

29 April 2012 35	Chelsea	6–1	Queens Park Rangers	London
13:30 BST	Sturridge 1'; Terry 13'; Torres 19', 25', 64'; Malouda 80'	Report	(yellow card) 61' Barton; 84' Cissé	Stadium: Stamford Bridge; Attendance: 41,675; Referee: Howard Webb

2 May 2012 36	Chelsea	0–2	Newcastle United	London
19:45 BST		Report	(yellow card) 4' Tioté; 19', 90+2' Cissé; (yellow card) 56' Cabaye; (yellow card) 90+1' Krul	Stadium: Stamford Bridge; Attendance: 41,559; Referee: Mark Halsey

8 May 2012 37	Liverpool	4–1	Chelsea	Liverpool
20:00 BST	Essien 19' (o.g.); Henderson 25', (yellow card) 65'; Agger 28', (yellow card) 70'; Shelvey 61'	Report	(yellow card) 15' Ferreira; (yellow card) 22' Terry; (yellow card) 44' Essien; (yellow card) 45' Ivanović; 50' Ramires	Stadium: Anfield; Attendance: 40,721; Referee: Kevin Friend

13 May 2012 38	Chelsea	2–1	Blackburn Rovers	London
15:00 BST	Terry 31'; Meireles 33'; Bertrand (yellow card) 90'	Report	60' Yakubu	Stadium: Stamford Bridge; Attendance: 40,742; Referee: Lee Mason

=== UEFA Champions League ===
==== Group stage ====
Pos	Team	Pld	W	D	L	GF	GA	GD	Pts	Qualification	CHE	LEV	VAL	GNK
1	(England) Chelsea	6	3	2	1	13	4	+9	11	Advance to knockout phase	—	2–0	3–0	5–0
2	(Germany) Bayer Leverkusen	6	3	1	2	8	8	0	10	Advance to knockout phase	2–1	—	2–1	2–0
3	(Spain) Valencia	6	2	2	2	12	7	+5	8	Transfer to Europa League	1–1	3–1	—	7–0
4	(Belgium) Genk	6	0	3	3	2	16	−14	3		1–1	1–1	0–0	—

Source: Soccerway

13 September 2011 1	Chelsea (England)	2–0	(Germany) Bayer Leverkusen	London, England
19:45 BST	Torres (yellow card) 9'; David Luiz (yellow card) 59' (goal) 67'; Mata 90+3'	Report	Gastro (yellow card) 38'; Bender (yellow card) 72'; Derdiyok (yellow card) 74'	Stadium: Stamford Bridge; Attendance: 33,820; Referee: Stéphane Lannoy (France)

28 September 2011 2	Valencia (Spain)	1–1	(England) Chelsea	Valencia, Spain
19:45 BST	Ruiz (yellow card) 13'; Albelda (yellow card) 48'; Soldado 87' (pen.)	Report	Lampard 55'; Kalou (yellow card) 86'; Malouda (yellow card) 90+3'; Mata (yellow card) 90+4'; Cole (yellow card) 90+4'	Stadium: Mestalla; Attendance: 33,791; Referee: Nicola Rizzoli (Italy)

19 October 2011 3	Chelsea (England)	5–0	(Belgium) Genk	London, England
19:45 BST	Meireles 8'; Torres 13', 50'; David Luiz (yellow card) 18'; Ivanović 42'; Kalou 72'	Report	Hyland (yellow card) 15'; Pudil (yellow card) 42'	Stadium: Stamford Bridge; Attendance: 38,518; Referee: Aleksei Nikolaev (Russia)

1 November 2011 4	Genk (Belgium)	1–1	(England) Chelsea	Genk, Belgium
19:45 GMT	Vossen 61'; De Bruyne (yellow card) 76'	Report	Ramires 25'; Meireles (yellow card) 90+2'	Stadium: Cristal Arena; Attendance: 24,000; Referee: Svein Oddvar Moen (Norway)

23 November 2011 5	Bayer Leverkusen (Germany)	2–1	(England) Chelsea	Leverkusen, Germany
19:45 GMT	Kießling (yellow card) 37'; Kadlec (yellow card) 39'; Ballack (yellow card) 44'; Derdiyok 73'; M. Friedrich 90+1'	Report	Drogba 62'; Ivanović (yellow card) 55'; Meireles (yellow card) 72'	Stadium: BayArena; Attendance: 28,551; Referee: Viktor Kassai (Hungary)

6 December 2011 6	Chelsea (England)	3–0	(Spain) Valencia	London, England
19:45 GMT	Drogba 3', 77'; Ramires 22'; Romeu (yellow card) 67'	Report	T. Costa (yellow card) 68'	Stadium: Stamford Bridge; Attendance: 41,109; Referee: Gianluca Rocchi (Italy)

==== Knockout phase ====
===== Round of 16 =====
21 February 2012 First leg	Napoli (Italy)	3–1	(England) Chelsea	Naples, Italy
19:45 GMT	Lavezzi 37', 65'; Cavani (yellow card) 39', (goal) 45+2'	Report	Mata 27'; Meireles (yellow card) 41'; Cahill (yellow card) 56'	Stadium: Stadio San Paolo; Attendance: 60,000; Referee: Carlos Velasco Carballo (Spain)

14 March 2012 Second leg	Chelsea (England)	4–1 (a.e.t.) (5–4 agg.)	(Italy) Napoli	London, England
19:45 GMT	Drogba 29'; Lampard (yellow card) 43', (goal) 75' (pen.); Terry 47'; Cole (yellow card) 98'; Ivanović 105+1'	Report	Cannavaro (yellow card) 53'; Inler 55', (yellow card) 112'; Dossena (yellow card) 68'; Campagnaro (yellow card) 115'	Stadium: Stamford Bridge; Attendance: 37,784; Referee: Felix Brych (Germany)

===== Quarter-finals =====
27 March 2012 First leg	Benfica (Portugal)	0–1	(England) Chelsea	Lisbon, Portugal
19:45 GMT	Bruno César (yellow card) 25'; Luisão (yellow card) 67'; García (yellow card) 75'	Report	Meireles (yellow card) 18'; Kalou 75'	Stadium: Estádio da Luz; Attendance: 60,830; Referee: Paolo Tagliavento (Italy)

4 April 2012 Second leg	Chelsea (England)	2–1 (3–1 agg.)	(Portugal) Benfica	London, England
19:45 GMT	Lampard 21' (pen.); Ivanović (yellow card) 38'; Ramires (yellow card) 44'; Mikel (yellow card) 79'; Meireles 90+2'	Report	Cardozo (yellow card) 19'; Pereira (yellow card) 20' (yellow-red card) 40'; Bruno César (yellow card) 20'; Aimar (yellow card) 27'; García 85'	Stadium: Stamford Bridge; Attendance: 37,264; Referee: Damir Skomina (Slovenia)

===== Semi-finals =====
18 April 2012 First leg	Chelsea (England)	1–0	(Spain) Barcelona	London, England
19:45 BST	Drogba 45+2', (yellow card) 88'; Ramires (yellow card) 69'	Report	Pedro (yellow card) 71'; Busquets (yellow card) 90+2'	Stadium: Stamford Bridge; Attendance: 38,039; Referee: Felix Brych (Germany)

24 April 2012 Second leg	Barcelona (Spain)	2–2 (2–3 agg.)	(England) Chelsea	Barcelona, Spain
19:45 BST	Busquets 35'; Iniesta 43', (yellow card) 50'; Messi (penalty missed) 49' (yellow card) 71'	Report	Mikel (yellow card) 32'; Terry (red card) 37'; Ramires (yellow card) 44', (goal) 45+1'; Ivanović (yellow card) 48'; Čech (yellow card) 59'; Lampard (yellow card) 72'; Meireles (yellow card) 89'; Torres 90+2'	Stadium: Camp Nou; Attendance: 95,845; Referee: Cüneyt Çakır (Turkey)

===== Final =====
19 May 2012 Final	Bayern Munich (Germany)	1 - 1 (a.e.t.) (3 - 4 p)	(England) Chelsea	Munich, Germany
20:45 CEST	Schweinsteiger (yellow card) 2'; Müller 83'; Robben (penalty missed) 95'	Report	Cole (yellow card) 81'; David Luiz (yellow card) 85'; Drogba 88', (yellow card) 93'; Torres (yellow card) 120'	Stadium: Allianz Arena; Attendance: 62,500; Referee: Pedro Proença (Portugal); Man of the Match: Didier Drogba
	Penalties
	Lahm (penalty scored); Gómez (penalty scored); Neuer (penalty scored); Olić (penalty missed); Schweinsteiger (penalty missed)		(penalty missed) Mata; (penalty scored) David Luiz; (penalty scored) Lampard; (penalty scored) Cole; (penalty scored) Drogba

=== League Cup ===
21 September 2011 Third round	Chelsea	0–0 (a.e.t.) (4–3 p)	Fulham	London
19:45 BST	Alex (red card) 47'; Lampard (yellow card) 120'	Report	Frei (yellow card) 98'	Stadium: Stamford Bridge; Attendance: 37,632; Referee: Chris Foy
	Penalties
	Lampard (penalty missed); David Luiz (penalty scored); Terry (penalty scored); Kalou (penalty scored); Malouda (penalty scored)		(penalty scored) Zamora; (penalty scored) Sidwell; (penalty missed) Dembélé; (penalty scored) Baird; (penalty missed) Ruiz

26 October 2011 Fourth round	Everton	1–2 (a.e.t.)	Chelsea	Liverpool
20:00 BST	Fellaini (yellow card) 20'; Baines (penalty missed) 61'; Saha 83'; Drenthe (yellow card) 75' (yellow-red card) 107'	Report	Anelka (penalty missed) 16'; Alex (yellow card) 23'; Kalou 38'; Turnbull (red card) 58'; Mikel (yellow card) 76'; Sturridge 116'	Stadium: Goodison Park; Attendance: 23,170; Referee: Lee Mason

29 November 2011 Quarter-finals	Chelsea	0–2	Liverpool	London
19:45 GMT	David Luiz (yellow card) 3'; Alex (yellow card) 21'; Malouda (yellow card) 34'; Lukaku (yellow card) 44'; Ramires (yellow card) 66'	Report	Coates (yellow card) 54'; Rodríguez 58'; Kelly 63'	Stadium: Stamford Bridge; Attendance: 40,511; Referee: Phil Dowd

=== FA Cup ===
8 January 2012 Third round	Chelsea	4–0	Portsmouth	London
15:00 GMT	Malouda (yellow card) 40'; Mata 48'; Terry (yellow card) 75'; Ramires 85', 87'; Meireles (yellow card) 90+2'; Lampard 90+3'	Report	(yellow card) 37' Pearce; (yellow card) 44' Halford; (yellow card) 76' Williams; (yellow card) 81' Kitson	Stadium: Stamford Bridge; Attendance: 41,529; Referee: Anthony Taylor

28 January 2012 Fourth round	Queens Park Rangers	0–1	Chelsea	London
12:00 GMT	Wright-Phillips (yellow card) 29'; Hall (yellow card) 47'	Report	62' (pen.) Mata; (yellow card) 73' Cole; (yellow card) 90' Romeu	Stadium: Loftus Road; Attendance: 15,728; Referee: Mike Dean

18 February 2012 Fifth round	Chelsea	1–1	Birmingham City	London
12:30 GMT	Mata (penalty missed) 23'; Cahill (yellow card) 55'; Sturridge 62'; David Luiz (yellow card) 90+2'	Report	20' Murphy; (yellow card) 34' Mutch	Stadium: Stamford Bridge; Attendance: 36,870; Referee: Martin Atkinson

6 March 2012 Replay	Birmingham City	0–2	Chelsea	Birmingham
19:45 GMT	Žigić (yellow card) 28'	Report	54', (penalty missed) 68' Mata; 60' Meireles; (yellow card) 63' Torres	Stadium: St Andrew's; Attendance: 21,822; Referee: Anthony Taylor

18 March 2012 Quarter-finals	Chelsea	5–2	Leicester City	London
14:05 GMT	Cahill 12'; Kalou 18'; Torres 67', 85'; Meireles 90+1'	Report	77' Beckford; 88' Marshall	Stadium: Stamford Bridge; Attendance: 38,276; Referee: Lee Probert

15 April 2012 Semi-finals	Tottenham Hotspur	1–5	Chelsea	London
18:00 BST	Bale 54'; Gallas (yellow card) 80'; Adebayor (yellow card) 90+1'; Parker (yellow card) 90+2'	Report	(yellow card) 16', (goal) 43' Drogba; 49' Mata; 77' Ramires; 81' Lampard; (yellow card) 90+3' Mikel; 90+5' Malouda	Stadium: Wembley Stadium; Attendance: 85,731; Referee: Martin Atkinson

5 May 2012 Final	Chelsea	2–1	Liverpool	London
17:15 BST	Ramires 9'; Mikel (yellow card) 37'; Drogba 52'	Report	(yellow card) 45' Agger; Carroll 64'; (yellow card) 82' Suárez	Stadium: Wembley Stadium; Attendance: 89,102; Referee: Phil Dowd; Man of the Match: Juan Mata

== Statistics ==
=== Appearances and goals ===
As of end of season

No.	Pos	Nat	Player	Total		Premier League		FA Cup		League Cup		Champions League	
No.	Pos	Nat	Player	Apps	Goals	Apps	Goals	Apps	Goals	Apps	Goals	Apps	Goals
1	GK	(Czech Republic) CZE	Petr Čech	56	0	34	0	7	0	1+1	0	13	0
2	DF	(Serbia) SRB	Branislav Ivanović	45	5	26+3	3	5	0	1	0	10	2
3	DF	(England) ENG	Ashley Cole	48	0	31+1	0	4	0	0	0	11+1	0
4	DF	(Brazil) BRA	David Luiz	40	3	18+2	2	5+1	0	3	0	11	1
5	MF	(Ghana) GHA	Michael Essien	19	0	10+4	0	0+3	0	0	0	1+1	0
6	MF	(Spain) ESP	Oriol Romeu	24	0	11+5	0	0+2	0	3	0	3	0
7	MF	(Brazil) BRA	Ramires	47	12	28+2	5	6	4	0+1	0	10	3
8	MF	(England) ENG	Frank Lampard	49	16	26+4	11	3+2	2	1+1	0	8+4	3
9	FW	(Spain) ESP	Fernando Torres	49	11	20+12	6	5+1	2	1	0	6+4	3
10	MF	(Spain) ESP	Juan Mata	54	12	29+5	6	7	4	0+1	0	11+1	2
11	FW	(Ivory Coast) CIV	Didier Drogba	35	13	16+8	5	2+1	2	0	0	7+1	6
12	MF	(Nigeria) NGR	Mikel John Obi	37	0	15+7	0	5	0	0+1	0	7+2	0
15	MF	(France) FRA	Florent Malouda	43	3	11+15	2	2+3	1	3	0	5+4	0
16	MF	(Portugal) POR	Raul Meireles	45	6	23+5	2	5+1	2	0	0	9+2	2
17	DF	(Portugal) POR	José Bosingwa	43	1	24+3	1	4	0	1	0	7+4	0
18	FW	(Belgium) BEL	Romelu Lukaku	12	0	1+7	0	0+1	0	3	0	0	0
19	DF	(Portugal) POR	Paulo Ferreira	9	0	3+3	0	0	0	1	0	1+1	0
21	FW	(Ivory Coast) CIV	Salomon Kalou	26	5	7+5	1	4+1	1	2	1	3+4	2
22	GK	(England) ENG	Ross Turnbull	5	0	2	0	0	0	2+1	0	0	0
23	FW	(England) ENG	Daniel Sturridge	43	13	28+2	11	3+1	1	1+1	1	5+2	0
24	DF	(England) ENG	Gary Cahill	19	2	9+1	1	3+1	1	0	0	4+1	0
26	DF	(England) ENG	John Terry	44	7	31	6	4	0	0+1	0	8	1
27	DF	(England) ENG	Sam Hutchinson	2	0	1+1	0	0	0	0	0	0	0
34	DF	(England) ENG	Ryan Bertrand	15	0	6+1	0	3+1	0	3	0	1	0
35	MF	(Brazil) BRA	Lucas Piazon	0	0	0	0	0	0	0	0	0	0
40	GK	(Portugal) POR	Henrique Hilário	2	0	2	0	0	0	0	0	0	0
45	DF	(England) ENG	Nathaniel Chalobah	0	0	0	0	0	0	0	0	0	0
Players who spent the season/part of the season out on loan, or left the club in January transfer window
20	MF	(England) ENG	Josh McEachran	5	0	0+2	0	0	0	3	0	0	0
30	MF	(Israel) ISR	Yossi Benayoun	1	0	0+1	0	0	0	0	0	0	0
33	DF	(Brazil) BRA	Alex	9	0	3	0	0	0	3	0	0+3	0
39	FW	(France) FRA	Nicolas Anelka	15	1	3+6	1	0	0	1+1	0	2+2	0

=== Goalscorers ===
As of end of season.

Rnk	No.	Pos	Player	Premier League	FA Cup	League Cup	Champions League	Total
1	8	MF	(England) Lampard	11	2	0	3	16
2	11	FW	(Ivory Coast) Drogba	5	2	0	6	13
2	23	FW	(England) Sturridge	11	1	1	0	13
4	7	MF	(Brazil) Ramires	5	4	0	3	12
4	10	MF	(Spain) Mata	6	4	0	2	12
6	9	FW	(Spain) Torres	6	2	0	3	11
7	26	DF	(England) Terry	6	0	0	1	7
8	16	MF	(Portugal) Meireles	2	2	—	2	6
9	2	DF	(Serbia) Ivanović	3	0	0	2	5
9	21	FW	(Ivory Coast) Kalou	1	1	1	2	5
11	4	DF	(Brazil) David Luiz	2	0	0	1	3
11	15	MF	(France) Malouda	2	1	0	0	3
13	24	DF	(England) Cahill	1	1	—	0	2
14	17	DF	(Portugal) Bosingwa	1	0	0	0	1
14	39	FW	(France) Anelka	1	—	0	0	1
Own Goals				2	0	0	0	2
TOTALS				65	20	2	25	112

=== Clean sheets ===
As of end of season.

Rnk	No.	Pos	Player	Premier League	FA Cup	League Cup	Champions League	Total
1	1	GK	(Czech Republic) Čech	10	3	1	5	19
2	22	GK	(England) Turnbull	0	0	0+1	0	1
TOTALS				10	3	1	5	20

=== Disciplinary record ===
As of end of season.

Rnk	Pos.	No.	Player	PL			FA Cup			League Cup			CL			Total (FA Total)		
Rnk	Pos.	No.	Player	Yellow card	(yellow card) (yellow-red card)	Red card	Yellow card	(yellow card) (yellow-red card)	Red card	Yellow card	(yellow card) (yellow-red card)	Red card	Yellow card	(yellow card) (yellow-red card)	Red card	Yellow card	(yellow card) (yellow-red card)	Red card
1	DF	3	(England) Ashley Cole	7	1	0	1	0	0	0	0	0	3	0	0	11 (8)	1 (1)	0
2	MF	16	(Portugal) Raul Meireles	8	0	0	1	0	0	—			5	0	0	14 (9)	0	0
3	DF	26	(England) John Terry	8	0	0	1	0	0	0	0	0	0	0	1	9 (9)	0	1 (0)
4	DF	4	(Brazil) David Luiz	5	0	0	1	0	0	1	0	0	3	0	0	10 (7)	0	0
5	DF	2	(Serbia) Branislav Ivanović	6	0	0	0	0	0	0	0	0	3	0	0	9 (6)	0	0
5	MF	12	(Nigeria) Mikel John Obi	4	0	0	2	0	0	1	0	0	2	0	0	9 (7)	0	0
7	FW	9	(Spain) Fernando Torres	4	0	1	1	0	0	0	0	0	2	0	0	7 (5)	0	1 (1)
8	MF	7	(Brazil) Ramires	4	0	0	0	0	0	1	0	0	3	0	0	8 (5)	0	0
8	MF	8	(England) Frank Lampard	5	0	0	0	0	0	1	0	0	2	0	0	8 (6)	0	0
10	DF	17	(Portugal) José Bosingwa	5	0	1	0	0	0	0	0	0	0	0	0	5 (5)	0	1 (1)
11	MF	15	(France) Florent Malouda	3	0	0	1	0	0	1	0	0	1	0	0	6 (5)	0	0
12	FW	11	(Ivory Coast) Didier Drogba	1	0	1	1	0	0	0	0	0	2	0	0	4 (2)	0	1 (1)
13	MF	6	(Spain) Oriol Romeu	2	0	0	1	0	0	0	0	0	1	0	0	4 (3)	0	0
13	DF	24	(England) Gary Cahill	2	0	0	1	0	0	—			1	0	0	4 (3)	0	0
15	DF	33	(Brazil) Alex	0	0	0	0	0	0	2	0	1	0	0	0	2 (2)	0	1 (1)
16	MF	5	(Ghana) Michael Essien	3	0	0	0	0	0	0	0	0	0	0	0	3 (3)	0	0
16	MF	10	(Spain) Juan Mata	2	0	0	0	0	0	0	0	0	1	0	0	3 (2)	0	0
16	FW	23	(England) Daniel Sturridge	3	0	0	0	0	0	0	0	0	0	0	0	3 (3)	0	0
19	GK	22	(England) Ross Turnbull	0	0	0	0	0	0	0	0	1	0	0	0	0	0	1 (1)
20	GK	1	(Czech Republic) Petr Čech	0	0	0	0	0	0	0	0	0	1	0	0	1 (0)	0	0
20	FW	18	(Belgium) Romelu Lukaku	0	0	0	0	0	0	1	0	0	0	0	0	1 (1)	0	0
20	DF	19	(Portugal) Paulo Ferreira	1	0	0	0	0	0	0	0	0	0	0	0	1 (1)	0	0
20	FW	21	(Ivory Coast) Salomon Kalou	0	0	0	0	0	0	0	0	0	1	0	0	1 (0)	0	0
20	DF	34	(England) Ryan Bertrand	1	0	0	0	0	0	0	0	0	0	0	0	1 (1)	0	0
TOTALS				74	1	3	11	0	0	8	0	2	31	0	1	124	1	6

=== Overall ===
As of end of season.

Games played	61 (38 Premier League, 13 UEFA Champions League, 3 Football League Cup, 7 FA Cup)
Games won	32 (18 Premier League, 7 UEFA Champions League, 1 Football League Cup, 6 FA Cup)
Games drawn	16 (10 Premier League, 4 UEFA Champions League, 1 Football League Cup, 1 FA Cup)
Games lost	13 (10 Premier League, 2 UEFA Champions League, 1 Football League Cup)
Goals scored	112 (65 Premier League, 25 UEFA Champions League, 2 Football League Cup, 20 FA Cup)
Goals conceded	66 (46 Premier League 12 UEFA Champions League, 3 Football League Cup, 5 FA Cup)
Goal difference	+46 (+19 Premier League, +13 UEFA Champions League, −1 Football League Cup, +15 FA Cup)
Clean sheets	19 (10 Premier League, 1 Football League Cup, 5 UEFA Champions League, 3 FA Cup)
Yellow cards	124 (74 Premier League, 31 UEFA Champions League, 8 Football League Cup, 11 FA Cup)
Red cards	7 (4 Premier League, 1 UEFA Champions League, 2 Football League Cup)
Worst discipline	(England) Ashley Cole (11 (yellow card) , 1 (yellow card) (yellow-red card) )
Best result(s)	W 6–1 (H) v Queens Park Rangers – Premier League – 29 April 2012
Worst result(s)	L 4–1 (A) v Liverpool – Premier League – 8 May 2012
Most appearances	(Czech Republic) Petr Čech with 56 appearances
Top scorer(s)	(England) Frank Lampard (16 goals)
Top assister(s)	(Spain) Juan Mata (20 assists)
