= Phil Dowd =

English football referee (born 1963)

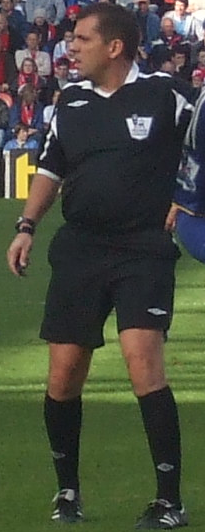
- Full name: Philip Dowd
- Born: 26 January 1963 (age 63); Leek, Staffordshire, England

Domestic
Years	League	Role
? – ?	Staffordshire Senior League	Referee
? – ?	Midland Football Alliance	Referee
1992–1997	Football League	Assistant referee
1997–2001	Football League	Referee
2001–2016	Premier League	Referee

Philip Dowd (born 26 January 1963) is a retired English professional football referee who officiated primarily in the Premier League. He is based in Stoke-on-Trent, Staffordshire, and was a member of the Staffordshire Football Association.

Dowd made his first appearance as an official in the Football League as an assistant referee in 1992. Since he was promoted to the list of Select Group Referees in 2001 he has refereed a number of notable matches, including the finals of the FA Cup, in 2012, and the Football League Cup, in 2010, as well as the FA Community Shield in 2011.

== Career ==
Dowd began refereeing in local leagues in 1984, eventually officiating in the Staffordshire Senior League and Midland Football Alliance. He was appointed to The Football League list of assistant referees in 1992, before joining the League's full list of referees in 1997, aged 34.

He was promoted to the Premier League list in 2001, his first match being a fixture between Fulham and Everton in December of that year. The 2014–15 season in English football was his fifteenth year refereeing in the top flight of English football.

In 2006, Dowd was the fourth official at that year's FA Cup final at the Millennium Stadium in Cardiff.

In 2009, Dowd gave Manchester United star Wayne Rooney a second yellow and sent him off for throwing the ball at Dowd out of anger.

On 5 February 2011, Dowd was appointed to a Premier League fixture between Newcastle United and Arsenal, notable for becoming the first game in the league's history in which a team recovered from being 4-0 down to salvage a draw. Dowd issued a 50th-minute red card to Arsenal's Abou Diaby for violent conduct towards two Newcastle players following a challenge with Joey Barton.

On 26 December 2011 Wigan Athletic's Conor Sammon was sent off by Dowd during his team's 5–0 defeat to Manchester United at Old Trafford. Wigan appealed the decision and the Football Association rescinded the red card three days later.

After missing the whole of the 2015–16 season due to injury the PGMOL announced Phil Dowd had retired.

== Notable matches ==
=== 2010 League Cup Final ===
28 February 2010
15:00 GMT

Aston Villa	1–2	Manchester United
Milner 5' (pen.); Collins (yellow card) 11'; Downing (yellow card) 18'	Report	Owen 12'; Rooney 74'; Evra (yellow card) 41'; Vidić (yellow card) 68'

Wembley Stadium, London
Attendance: 88,596

On 28 February 2010 Dowd refereed the League Cup final between Manchester United and Aston Villa at Wembley Stadium. In the fifth minute of the match, Dowd deemed Manchester United's Nemanja Vidić to have fouled Aston Villa's Gabriel Agbonlahor in the penalty area. Whilst Dowd did award Villa a penalty kick, he elected not to punish Vidić; some commentators felt the offence qualified as a professional foul and therefore warranted a red card. United overturned Villa's early penalty to ultimately win the match, and trophy, 2–1.

=== 2011 FA Community Shield ===
7 August 2011
14:30 BST

Manchester City	2–3	Manchester United
Lescott 38'; Džeko 45+1'; Džeko (yellow card) 19'; Richards (yellow card) 22'; Y. Touré (yellow card) 34'; Milner (yellow card) 55'; Kolarov (yellow card) 60'	Report	Smalling 52'; Nani 58', 90+4'; Anderson (yellow card) 19'; Evra (yellow card) 40'

Wembley Stadium, London
Attendance: 77,169

Dowd officiated the 2011 FA Community Shield on 7 August 2011 between Manchester City and Manchester United, also the 160th Manchester derby, at London's Wembley Stadium. United won the match 3–2 with a last-minute winner courtesy of Nani. Dowd issued seven yellow cards during the course of the game.

=== 2012 FA Cup Final ===
5 May 2012
17:15 BST

Chelsea	2–1	Liverpool
Ramires 10'; Drogba 51'; Mikel (yellow card) 36'	Report	Carroll 63'; Agger (yellow card) 44'; Suárez (yellow card) 81'

Wembley Stadium, London
Attendance: 89,102

Dowd refereed the 2012 FA Cup Final between Chelsea and Liverpool, at Wembley Stadium on 5 May 2012. He was assisted by Stuart Burt and Andrew Garratt and Mike Jones was the fourth official. Dowd described his appointment to the Cup final as an "honour and privilege". The fixture took place on the third anniversary of the death of his father, whom Dowd said had always hoped to see his son referee a final of the FA Cup.

== Card statistics ==
Season	Games	Total (yellow card)	(yellow card) per game	Total (red card)	(red card) per game
1998/99	32	125	3.91	3	0.09
1999/00	33	85	2.58	4	0.12
2000/01	33	120	3.64	10	0.30
2001/02	29	109	3.76	13	0.45
2002/03	38	130	3.42	8	0.21
2003/04	28	104	3.71	6	0.21
2004/05	36	115	3.19	7	0.19
2005/06	46	183	3.98	8	0.17
2006/07	33	99	3.00	3	0.09
2007/08	41	113	2.75	10	0.24
2008/09	45	148	3.28	11	0.24
2009/10	39	135	3.46	5	0.13
2010/11	38	139	3.66	12	0.32
2011/12	38	137	3.61	5	0.13
2012/13	38	130	3.42	5	0.13

Statistics for all competitions. No records are available prior to 1998/99.

== See also ==
- List of football referees

Preceded by Mike Dean	FA Trophy Final; 2005	Succeeded by Howard Webb
