= 2012 FA Cup final =

English association football match

- The match programme cover, featuring Chelsea’s Didier Drogba and Liverpool's Martin Škrtel
- Event: 2011–12 FA Cup
Chelsea	Liverpool
2	1
- Date: 5 May 2012
- Venue: Wembley Stadium, London
- Man of the Match: Juan Mata (Chelsea)
- Referee: Phil Dowd (Staffordshire)
- Attendance: 89,102
- Weather: Mostly cloudy 9 °C (48 °F)

The 2012 FA Cup final was a football match between Chelsea and Liverpool on 5 May 2012. It was the final match of the 2011–12 FA Cup, the 131st season of the world's oldest football knockout competition, the FA Cup. Chelsea were participating in their eleventh final, they had previously won six and lost four. Liverpool were appearing in their fourteenth final, they had won seven times and lost six. Scheduled to provide a clear four-week period between the end of the English season and the start of UEFA Euro 2012, the date of the final clashed with Premier League fixtures. To avoid having the final played at the same time as league games, the match kicked off at the later time of 5:15 p.m., rather than the usual 3:00 p.m., by which time the other fixtures had ended.

As both teams were in the highest tier of English football, the Premier League, they entered the competition in the Third Round. Matches up to the semi-final were contested on a one-off basis, with a replay taking place if the match ended in a draw. Chelsea's matches ranged from comfortable victories to close affairs. They beat Tottenham Hotspur 5–1 in the semi-final, while they beat Queens Park Rangers 1–0 in the Fourth Round. Liverpool's matches were similar, with three ending in a 2–1 scoreline, while the other two against Oldham Athletic and Brighton & Hove Albion were won by at least four goals.

Watched by a crowd of 89,102, Ramires put Chelsea in front in the 11th minute after he dispossessed Liverpool midfielder Jay Spearing and beat Pepe Reina in the Liverpool area. They extended their lead in the 52nd minute when striker Didier Drogba scored. Liverpool substitute Andy Carroll scored in the 64th minute to reduce the deficit to one goal. Carroll thought he had scored a second in the 81st minute, but his header was saved on the line by Chelsea goalkeeper Petr Čech. Carroll ran off celebrating, as he thought the ball had crossed, but referee Phil Dowd did not award a goal and Chelsea held on to win the match 2–1.

== Route to the final ==
=== Chelsea ===
Round	Opposition	Score
3rd	Portsmouth (H)	4–0
4th	Queens Park Rangers (A)	1–0
5th Replay	Birmingham City (H); Birmingham City (A)	1–1; 2–0
6th	Leicester City (H)	5–2
SF	Tottenham Hotspur (N)	5–1

As a Premier League team, Chelsea entered the competition in the Third Round, where they were drawn at home to Portsmouth. After a goalless first half Juan Mata struck early in the second, before Ramires hit two in two minutes and Frank Lampard scored in stoppage time to give Chelsea a 4–0 win. Chelsea then travelled to face local rivals Queens Park Rangers at Loftus Road in the Fourth Round, where a controversial Mata penalty was enough to see them through.

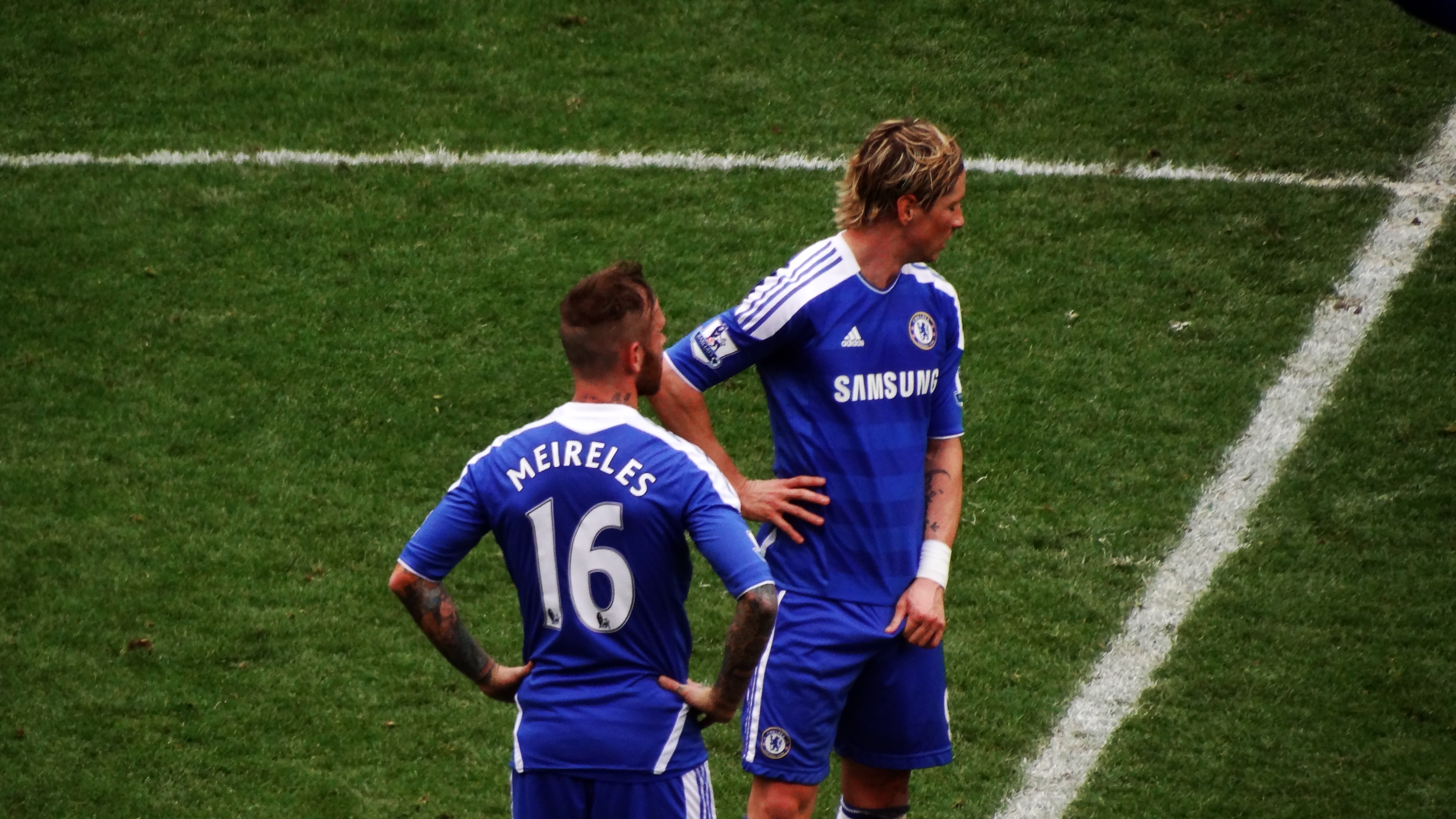
Raul Meireles (left) and Fernando Torres (right) during Chelsea's Sixth Round match against Leicester City

Chelsea were drawn to play at home against Birmingham City in the Fifth Round, with Birmingham dominating the first half through a David Murphy goal. Daniel Sturridge scored in the second half to force a replay, which was played on 6 March at Birmingham, just two days after André Villas-Boas was relieved of his duties as Chelsea manager. Birmingham held Chelsea throughout the first half, and looked the stronger side at times, but after Mata and Raul Meireles scored twice in five minutes, Chelsea dominated the remainder of the game until the final whistle. In the Sixth Round, Chelsea overcame Leicester City at home in a 5–2 thriller. Gary Cahill scored his first FA Cup goal for Chelsea from a corner in the 12th minute, with Salomon Kalou following up five minutes later. In the second half, Fernando Torres ended a goal drought of over 25 hours to score, before Jermaine Beckford gave Leicester a late lifeline. Torres scored again in the 85th minute to put the result beyond doubt, although Ben Marshall grabbed one back three minutes later, before Meireles scored in the 90th minute to send Chelsea through to the semi-final.

In the semi-final, Chelsea faced local rivals Tottenham Hotspur at Wembley. The first half was even, with both sides enjoying long spells of possession, until Didier Drogba put Chelsea ahead just before the break. Chelsea scored at the start of the second half. However, Juan Mata's goal that did not appear to cross the line, but referee Martin Atkinson awarded the goal. Gareth Bale put Tottenham back in it with a goal shortly after a Petr Čech challenge on Emmanuel Adebayor. Despite the goal, Tottenham never took control of the game and Ramires scored in the 77th minute, followed minutes later by a Frank Lampard free kick, and a Florent Malouda strike in the fourth minute of added time. This secured Chelsea's place in their first FA Cup Final since their 2010 triumph over Portsmouth.

=== Liverpool ===
Round	Opposition	Score
3rd	Oldham Athletic (H)	5–1
4th	Manchester United (H)	2–1
5th	Brighton & Hove Albion (H)	6–1
6th	Stoke City (H)	2–1
SF	Everton (N)	2–1

Liverpool – also a Premier League team – entered the competition in the Third Round as well. Their opening match was a 5–1 home win against Oldham Athletic. Robbie Simpson opened the scoring for Oldham in the 28th minute, but Craig Bellamy equalised just two minutes later, with Steven Gerrard scoring a penalty to give Liverpool the lead. Jonjo Shelvey scored his first goal for the club in the second half, before late goals from Andy Carroll and Stewart Downing ensured progression to the Fourth Round.

For the Fourth Round, Liverpool were drawn at their home ground, Anfield against Manchester United. The match took place in the wake of the racial abuse row between Luis Suárez and Patrice Evra, for which Suárez was serving an eight-match ban. Daniel Agger opened the scoring with a header from a corner, before Park Ji-sung equalised for United before half-time. With the match approaching full-time, Dirk Kuyt scored in the 88th minute to give Liverpool a 2–1 victory and secured their place in the Fifth Round. Their opponents were Brighton & Hove Albion, whom Liverpool beat 6–1 at Anfield, courtesy of goals from Martin Škrtel, Carroll and Suárez, as well as three own goals.

Liverpool faced Stoke City in the Sixth Round at Anfield. Suárez scored in the 23rd minute to give Liverpool the lead, before former player Peter Crouch equalised three minutes later. Downing scored in the second half to secure a 2–1 for the club and ensure their place in the semi-finals. Local rivals Everton were the opponents in the semi-final, held at Wembley Stadium. Nikica Jelavić scored in the 24th minute after a Liverpool defensive error, to give Everton a 1–0 lead. Liverpool equalised in the second half when Suárez scored after a back-pass from Everton defender Sylvain Distin. The match looked to be heading towards extra time, before Carroll headed in a Craig Bellamy free kick in the 87th minute to give Liverpool a 2–1 victory and secure their place in the final for the first time since 2006, when they defeated West Ham United.

== Background ==
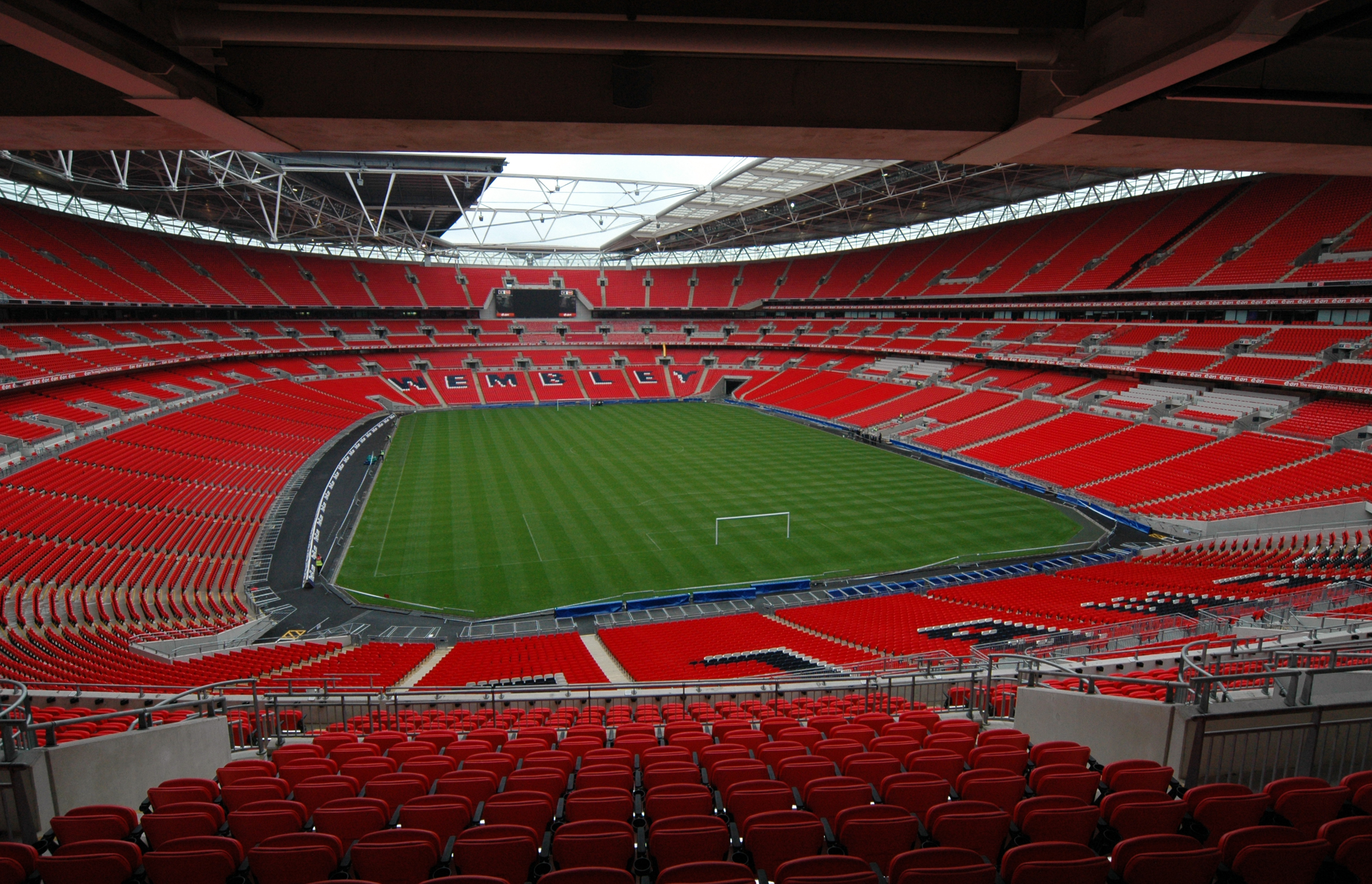
Wembley Stadium, which was the venue for the final.

Appearing in the final for the fourteenth time, Liverpool had won the FA Cup seven times previously (in 1965, 1974, 1986, 1989, 1992, 2001 and 2006), and had been beaten in the final six times (in 1914, 1950, 1971, 1977, 1988 and 1996). Chelsea were appearing in the final for the eleventh time. They had won the FA Cup six times previously (in 1970, 1997, 2000, 2007, 2009 and 2010), and had been beaten in the final four times (in 1915, 1967, 1994 and 2002). Liverpool and Chelsea had previously met nine times in the FA Cup, including two semi-finals (most recently in 2006), although they had never met in the final before. Chelsea had the upper hand in those nine meetings, winning five times to Liverpool's four; however, Liverpool won both semi-finals between the two clubs, both on neutral grounds. The only domestic cup final to feature both teams was the 2005 League Cup final, which Chelsea won 3–2 at the Millennium Stadium in Cardiff.

Liverpool and Chelsea had faced each other twice during the season, with Liverpool winning on both occasions. Liverpool won the first meeting in the 2011–12 Premier League 2–1, they won their second meeting in the 2011–12 Football League Cup 2–0, before winning the final against Cardiff City. As Liverpool and Chelsea had been due to play one another in the Premier League at Anfield on 5 May 2012, the same day as the final, the FA announced that the league game would be postponed until Tuesday 8 May, meaning that the two sides would play each other twice in four days.

Both teams had injury concerns ahead of the final. Liverpool were expected to be without midfielders Charlie Adam and Lucas Leiva, who were both out with knee injuries, while Chelsea were missing defenders David Luiz and Gary Cahill to hamstring injuries. Liverpool captain Steven Gerrard was determined to claim a domestic double with victory in the final: "The FA Cup is special, but we got a taste of success from winning the Carling Cup. That will help the younger players in the squad. Winning breeds confidence and you want more." Gerrard believed success in the final would compensate for a poor season in the Premier League: "We are all aware we have underachieved in the league and the squad of players is certainly better than where we are. We will assess the season and if we win two trophies I think it would alleviate the pressure slightly." Chelsea captain John Terry was hopeful Chelsea would win the final, to help caretaker manager Roberto Di Matteo's hopes of getting the job full-time: "To win it [the Cup] will put himself in a very good position. He's not thinking of that at the moment, he's not letting the players get distracted by anything. He's very passionate, he's Chelsea through and through, and that's certainly rubbed off on the players. So, if we can do it with the added bonus that Robbie can get the job at the end, that'd be great."

In addition to the later kick-off time, travelling supporters from Liverpool faced major difficulties getting to and from the final after Virgin Trains cancelled the majority of its direct services between Liverpool Lime Street and London Euston with maintenance work taking place on the West Coast Main Line over the May Day bank holiday weekend. Both teams were allocated 25,074 tickets for the final, which was 7,000 fewer than they received for the semi-finals. 17,000 tickets went to Club Wembley members, who are effectively season ticket holders at Wembley Stadium, while the remainder went to the grassroots football community.

== Match ==
=== First half ===
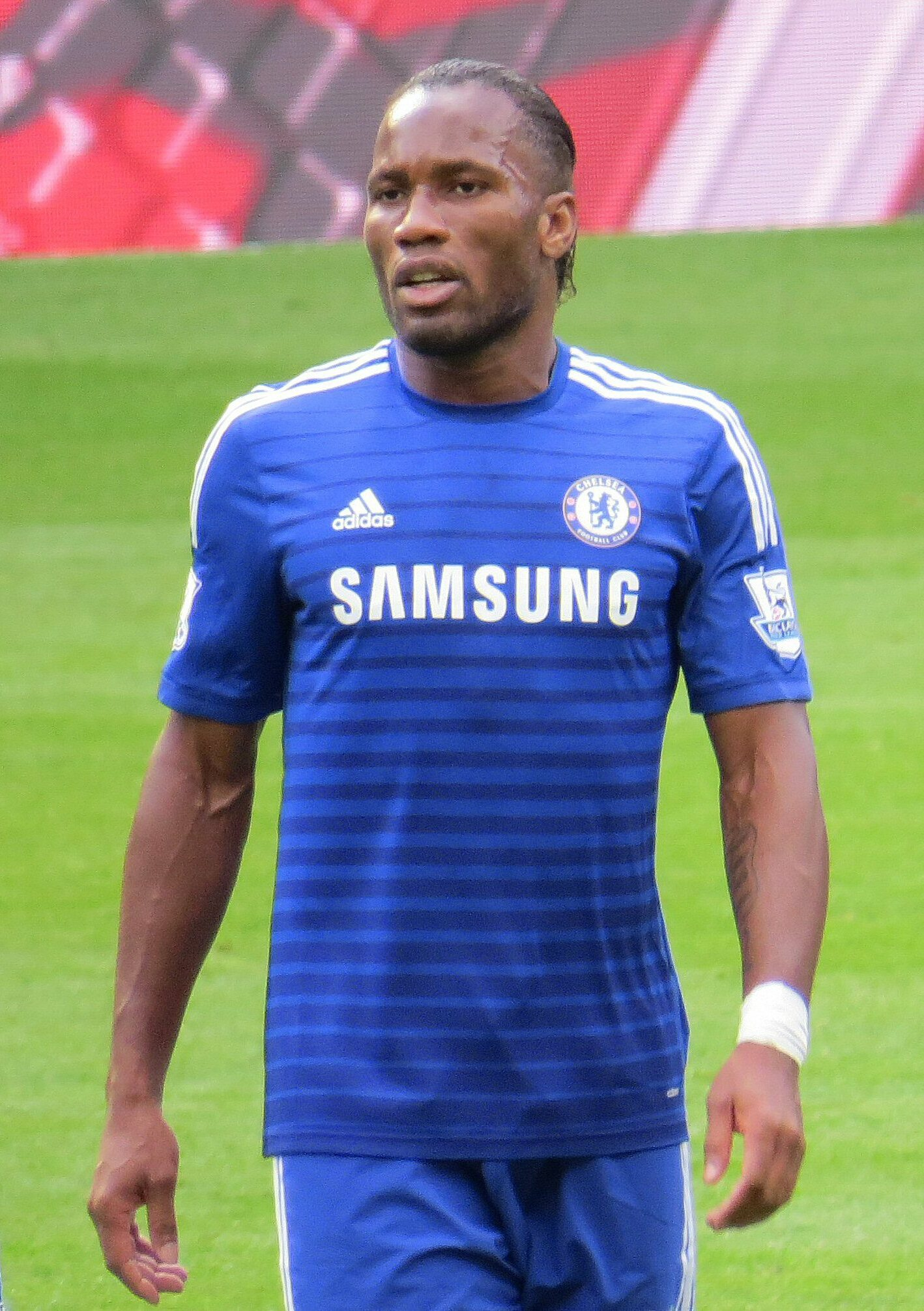
Chelsea striker Didier Drogba scored the winning goal in the final.

Chelsea kicked off and had the first shot within the first minute when Didier Drogba fired over the crossbar. Liverpool had more of the ball in the opening minutes, but striker Luis Suárez struggled to maintain possession of the ball against the Chelsea defence. Chelsea scored in the 10th minute when Liverpool midfielder Jay Spearing lost possession of the ball to Ramires; the Brazilian subsequently went past defender José Enrique into the Liverpool penalty area, where his shot went through goalkeeper Pepe Reina's legs and into the goal to give Chelsea a 1–0 lead. Liverpool responded by going on the attack; a Glen Johnson pass found striker Craig Bellamy, whose shot was cleared off the line by Chelsea defender Branislav Ivanović. Liverpool were still struggling to maintain possession; with Steven Gerrard playing deep in midfield, there was a lack of support for striker Suárez. Chelsea midfielder Frank Lampard profited from Liverpool's failure to hold on to possession when he received the ball from a misplaced Jordan Henderson pass, but his shot 40 yards (37 m) away from goal went wide.

In the 33rd minute, a Chelsea free-kick, awarded after Ramires was brought down by Enrique, was cleared by the Liverpool defence; Enrique then had the chance to counter Chelsea's attack, but he delayed his run and was dispossessed. The first yellow card of the match was shown to Chelsea midfielder Mikel John Obi in the 36th minute after a mistimed tackle on Gerrard. A cross from midfielder Stewart Downing was headed out for a Liverpool corner in the 40th minute, but the subsequent corner was cleared by Chelsea goalkeeper Petr Čech. Liverpool had another chance straight afterwards, but Suárez was unable to direct his header at goal after receiving the ball from Henderson. Towards the end of the half, Daniel Agger was shown a yellow card for his challenge on Mikel.

=== Second half ===
Liverpool kicked off the second half, but it was Chelsea who had the first attack. Chelsea defender Ashley Cole had space in the Liverpool penalty area, but his pass to Juan Mata was intercepted by the Liverpool defence. The Reds subsequently went on the attack and won a corner, but the ball into the Chelsea penalty area by Bellamy was cleared. Liverpool continued to attack but were denied a penalty in the 50th minute, when Gerrard went down in the Chelsea penalty area. The ball was subsequently put back into the Chelsea penalty area by Downing, but Henderson could only head the ball to Chelsea players. Liverpool were made to rue their missed chances, as two minutes later, Chelsea had extended their lead. Lampard got away from Spearing and passed to Drogba on the edge of the Liverpool penalty area; he advanced past Liverpool defender Martin Škrtel and shot through the legs of Reina and into the Liverpool goal to make the score 2–0. Liverpool went on the offensive after the second Chelsea goal. A Suárez shot was saved by Čech, and manager Kenny Dalglish replaced midfielder Spearing with striker Andy Carroll. The substitution worked: In the 64th minute, Carroll scored when Downing won a tackle on the left-hand side of the pitch, which resulted in the ball breaking to Carroll. His subsequent shot beat Čech in the Chelsea goal to reduce the deficit to 2–1.

Liverpool continued to press forward following their goal. Carroll found Gerrard with a headed pass in the 71st minute, but Gerrard's shot went over the crossbar. Two minutes later, a Suárez shot was saved by Čech and went out for a Liverpool corner, but Agger's header from the resulting corner flew wide. Carroll had a number of chances in the subsequent minutes, but none of his headers hit the target. Chelsea replaced goalscorer Ramires with midfielder Raul Meireles in the 76th minute, and a minute later, Bellamy was replaced by Dirk Kuyt for Liverpool. A minute after the substitution, Suárez worked his way into the Chelsea half and had his pass to Kuyt cleared, but it fell to Henderson, whose shot went over the Chelsea goal. Carroll thought he equalised in the 81st minute when his header from a Suárez cross was then palmed by Čech onto the underside of the bar and away to safety. Carroll ran away celebrating his second goal, but after consulting with his assistant, referee Phil Dowd did not award the goal. Replays of the incident remain ambiguous as to whether the ball crossed the line completely. Liverpool continued to push forward for the equaliser in the closing minutes, but they were unable to score, and the match finished 2–1 to Chelsea.

=== Details ===
5 May 2012
17:15 BST

Chelsea	2–1	Liverpool
Ramires 11'; Drogba 52'	Report	Carroll 64'

Wembley Stadium, London
Attendance: 89,102
Referee: Phil Dowd (Staffordshire)

Chelsea	Liverpool

GK	1	(Czech Republic) Petr Čech
RB	17	(Portugal) José Bosingwa
CB	2	(Serbia) Branislav Ivanović
CB	26	(England) John Terry (c)
LB	3	(England) Ashley Cole
CM	12	(Nigeria) Mikel John Obi	(yellow card) 36'
CM	8	(England) Frank Lampard
RW	7	(Brazil) Ramires		(substituted off) 75'
AM	10	(Spain) Juan Mata		(substituted off) 90'
LW	21	(Ivory Coast) Salomon Kalou
CF	11	(Ivory Coast) Didier Drogba
Substitutes:
GK	22	(England) Ross Turnbull
DF	19	(Portugal) Paulo Ferreira
MF	5	(Ghana) Michael Essien
MF	15	(France) Florent Malouda		(substituted on) 90'
MF	16	(Portugal) Raul Meireles		(substituted on) 75'
FW	9	(Spain) Fernando Torres
FW	23	(England) Daniel Sturridge
Manager:
(Italy) Roberto Di Matteo (interim)

GK	25	(Spain) Pepe Reina
RB	2	(England) Glen Johnson
CB	37	(Slovakia) Martin Škrtel
CB	5	(Denmark) Daniel Agger	(yellow card) 44'
LB	3	(Spain) José Enrique
CM	14	(England) Jordan Henderson
CM	20	(England) Jay Spearing		(substituted off) 54'
RW	39	(Wales) Craig Bellamy		(substituted off) 76'
AM	8	(England) Steven Gerrard (c)
LW	19	(England) Stewart Downing
CF	7	(Uruguay) Luis Suárez	(yellow card) 81'
Substitutes:
GK	32	(Brazil) Doni
DF	23	(England) Jamie Carragher
DF	34	(England) Martin Kelly
MF	11	(Argentina) Maxi Rodríguez
MF	33	(England) Jonjo Shelvey
FW	9	(England) Andy Carroll		(substituted on) 54'
FW	18	(Netherlands) Dirk Kuyt		(substituted on) 76'
Manager:
(Scotland) Kenny Dalglish

Man of the match

- Juan Mata (Chelsea)

Match officials

- Assistant referees:
  - Stuart Burt (Northamptonshire)
  - Andrew Garratt (Staffordshire)
- Fourth official: Mike Jones (Cheshire)
- Reserve official: Simon Long (Cornwall)

Match rules

- 90 minutes
- 30 minutes of extra-time if necessary
- Penalty shoot-out if scores still level
- Seven named substitutes, of which up to three may be used

=== Statistics ===
Statistic	Chelsea	Liverpool
Total shots	14	18
Shots on target	6	10
Ball possession	45%	55%
Corner kicks	1	7
Fouls committed	5	8
Offsides	3	4
Yellow cards	1	2
Red cards	0	0

== Post-match ==
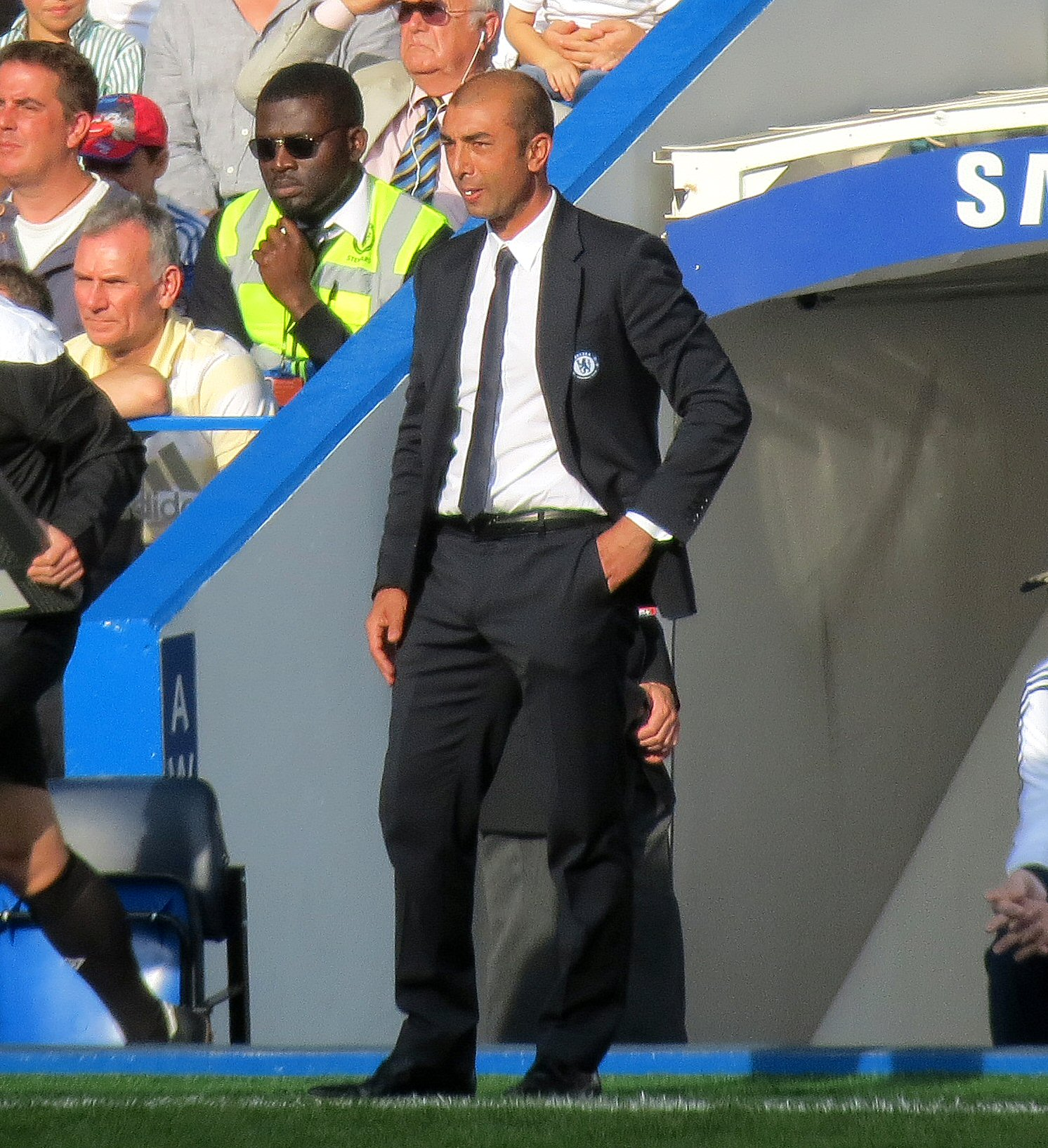
Interim Chelsea manager Roberto Di Matteo hoped the win would earn him the position on a permanent basis.

Chelsea's victory meant they won the FA Cup for the seventh time. Caretaker manager Roberto Di Matteo was relaxed about his prospects of securing the full-term following their victory: "The boss [ Roman Abramovich ] will make a decision at the end of the season. I'm very relaxed about it and the players will be fine, I am a very fortunate person so it is not an issue." Di Matteo was delighted with his players, as they survived Liverpool's attacks in the final minutes to secure victory: "I am very pleased for the players," said Di Matteo. "We have had a difficult season with a lot of criticism but they have responded to all the adversity we have faced. I'm very pleased and satisfied with our performance today." Chelsea captain John Terry was equally pleased with the performance, but turned his attention to the 2012 UEFA Champions League Final, where they would face Bayern Munich: "It's fantastic, it's what we live for. We've still got a massive trophy, the Champions League - that's the target for the owner from day dot. We've done Robbie the world of good and it can do him no harm."

Liverpool manager Kenny Dalglish was adamant that his players would improve following the defeat: "They've been in two cup finals in this season – they'll have enjoyed the first one more than the second, the lads will benefit from the experience. You can't give a team like Chelsea a two-goal head start." When asked about his future as manager of the club Dalglish stated: "We'll assess the season at the end of the season." Captain Steven Gerrard echoed Dalglish's sentiments: "With the players we have in that dressing room, we could have done better. But we are Liverpool. We will bounce back. We will strengthen in the summer and come back fighting again. That's what Liverpool Football Club does." Striker Andy Carroll, who scored one goal and had another disallowed, thought the ball had crossed the line: "I thought it was over the line and you know better than me but I thought it was. I thought it hit the other side of the bar but I haven't seen it back."

The two sides met in the Premier League three days after the final, a match that Liverpool won 4–1. Liverpool finished the season in eighth place and Dalglish was subsequently sacked 8 days later on 16 May 2012 and replaced by Swansea City manager Brendan Rodgers. Chelsea would finish the season in sixth place; however, they won the 2011–12 UEFA Champions League, beating Bayern Munich 4–3 in a penalty shoot-out after the final finished 1–1 after extra time. Chelsea's victory in the FA Cup final set up a Community Shield match against Manchester City, the winners of the 2011–12 Premier League.

The match was broadcast live in the United Kingdom, in HD on ITV1 and also on ESPN. A peak of 11.2 million saw the climax of the game on ITV1 with 8.9 million viewers on average watching the live match coverage. It was the highest-rated final since the 2007 final. ESPN's coverage of the final attracted 397,000 viewers.
