= Ramires =

Brazilian association football player (born 1987)

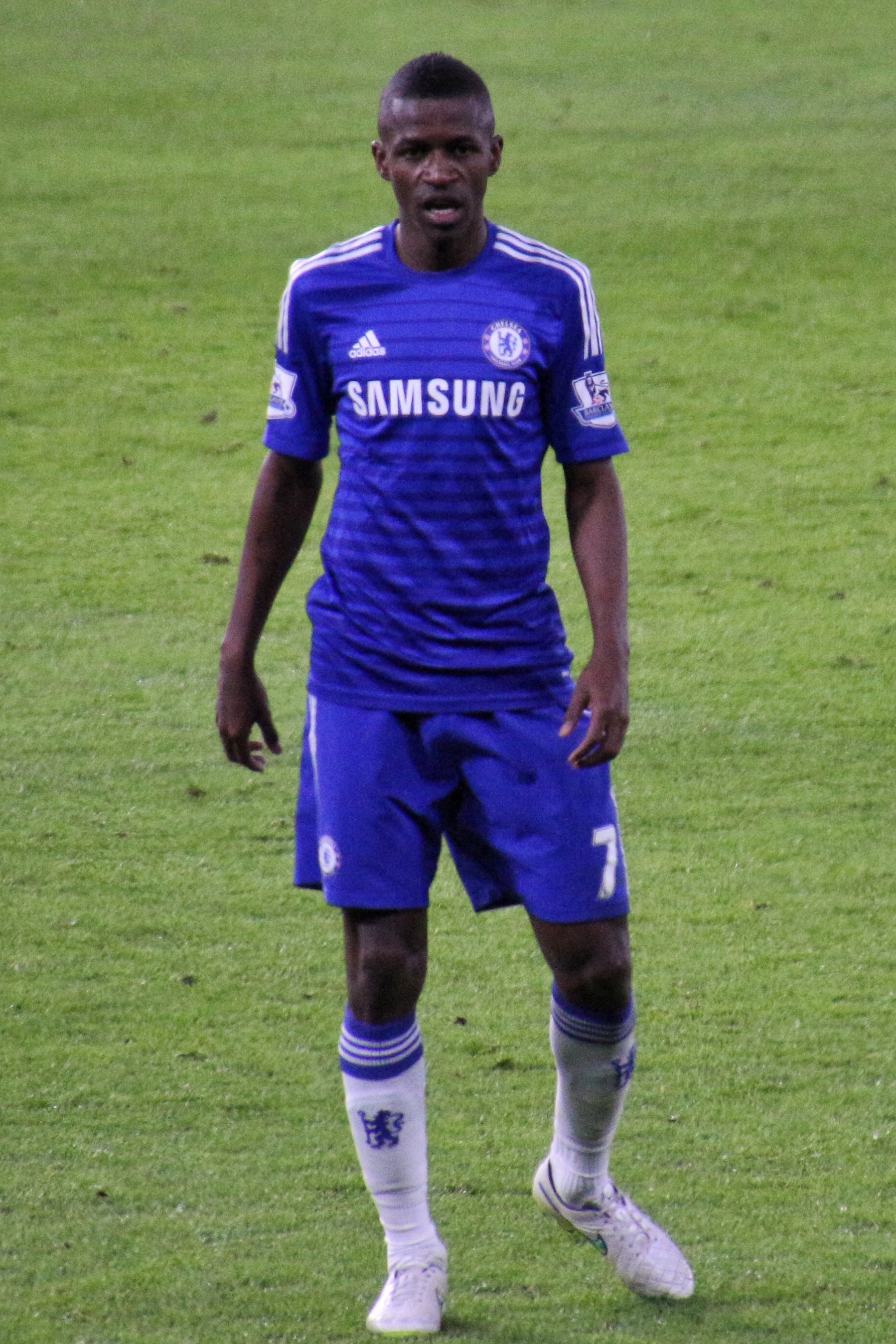
- Ramires playing for Chelsea in 2015

Personal information
- Full name: Ramires Santos do Nascimento
- Date of birth: 24 March 1987 (age 39)
- Place of birth: Barra do Piraí, Brazil
- Height: 1.80 m (5 ft 11 in)
- Position: Defensive midfielder

Youth career
- 2004–2005: Royal Sport Club
- 2005–2006: Joinville

Senior career*
Years	Team	Apps	(Gls)
2006–2007	Joinville	14	(3)
2007–2009	Cruzeiro	86	(19)
2009–2010	Benfica	26	(4)
2010–2016	Chelsea	159	(17)
2016–2019	Jiangsu Suning	49	(11)
2019–2020	Palmeiras	33	(1)
Total		367	(55)

International career
2008	Brazil U23	9	(0)
2009–2014	Brazil	52	(4)
Medal record
Men's football
Representing Brazil
FIFA Confederations Cup
Winner	2009 South Africa
Summer Olympics
Bronze medal – third place	2008 Beijing
- * Club domestic league appearances and goals

Ramires Santos do Nascimento (Brazilian Portuguese: [ʁaˈmiɾes ˈsɐ̃tuz du nasiˈmẽtu]; born 24 March 1987), known as Ramires, is a Brazilian former professional footballer. A midfielder, he was comfortable playing in either the centre or right midfielder position. He normally played as a box-to-box midfielder role because of his energy in supporting defensive and attacking play.

Ramires began his career playing for Royal Sport Club, at Barra do Piraí, 114 km north-west of Rio de Janeiro. In 2005, he signed for Joinville, before joining Cruzeiro, with whom he spent just over two seasons, appearing in 61 league matches and scoring 10 times. In 2009, Ramires moved to Portugal and signed for Benfica. He spent one season with Benfica in which he helped them to the Primeira Liga title and Taça da Liga. He then joined English club Chelsea in the summer of 2010 and won every major domestic and European competition with them. In January 2016, Ramires signed for Jiangsu Suning for £25 million.

Ramires is a former Brazilian international, making his debut on 6 June 2009 in a 2010 FIFA World Cup qualification match against Uruguay. He was in the teams which won the 2009 FIFA Confederations Cup and a bronze medal at the 2008 Olympics. As well being a member of the Brazil national team for the 2010 World Cup, 2011 Copa América and 2014 World Cup, he was capped 52 times.

== Club career ==
=== Cruzeiro ===
In January 2008, Ramires agreed to a five-year deal with Cruzeiro in a permanent move from Joinville for a $300,000 transfer fee following a loan period, giving Cruzeiro 70% of the player's economic rights. Joinville kept 30% in the event of any transfers in the future. He was referred to by the fans and media during his time there as the "Queniano Azul", or "Blue Kenyan", due to Cruzeiro's blue kit and his endurance, which was considered reminiscent of Kenyan runners, who are famous for winning many Brazilian running marathons.

=== Benfica ===
On 21 May 2009, Ramires joined Portuguese club Benfica for a €7.5 million transfer fee on a five-year contract with a minimum fee release of €30 million. He starred as an important player for Benfica throughout the season, as the Portuguese club won their 32nd league title after a five-year wait. In his first and only season with Benfica, Ramires also won the Taça da Liga, defeating Porto 3–0. In June 2010, Benfica sold 50% of Ramires' economic rights to English player agency Jazzy Limited, directed by Kia Joorabchian, for €6 million.

=== Chelsea ===
On 4 August 2010, Benfica announced they had agreed a deal with defending English Premier League champions Chelsea and his third-party owner for €22 million. He completed his move to Chelsea on 13 August, signing a four-year contract. He was handed the number 7 shirt, previously worn by Ukrainian international Andriy Shevchenko.

==== 2010–11 season ====
On 28 August 2010, Ramires made his debut for Chelsea against Stoke City in the Premier League; he came on as an 84th minute substitute for Michael Essien as Chelsea won 2–0. On 11 September 2010, he made his full Premier League debut, starting against West Ham United at Upton Park, playing the full 90 minutes in a 1–3 win. He started in Chelsea's 2–0 win over Arsenal on 3 October 2010, winning possession and then putting Ashley Cole through to cross to Didier Drogba for Chelsea's first goal.

On 29 December 2010, Ramires started in Chelsea's 1–0 win over Bolton Wanderers, where his performance was praised and was known to have his best game with Chelsea to date, where he made several runs forward and strong tackles winning the ball several times in the midfield. On Chelsea's return fixture at Bolton, Ramires scored his first goal as a Chelsea player in a 0–4 victory at Reebok Stadium. On 15 January 2011, he played the full 90 minutes against Blackburn Rovers in a 2–0 win at Stamford Bridge. On 1 March, he started and played the full 90 minutes in the 2–1 league win over Manchester United at Stamford Bridge.

On 20 March, Ramires scored his second Premier League goal in a 2–0 win over Manchester City at Stamford Bridge. He scored alongside fellow Brazilian David Luiz and made a superb individual effort, dribbling past three City defenders and scoring past Joe Hart in the top-left corner, which earned him "Goal of the Season" honours for Chelsea. These performances made Ramires a fan favourite amongst Chelsea fans, who nicknamed him "Rambo" due to his tendency to destroy the opposition one by one. He also has the nickname "Ray Mears" for the way he goes venturing into the oppositions half and the similarity it has with his name. On 12 April, he received a second yellow card for a challenge on Nani against Manchester United in the Champions League quarter-final at Old Trafford. On 8 May, Ramires came on as a second-half substitute for Mikel John Obi against Manchester United again at Old Trafford in a 2–1 defeat, which effectively gave their rivals the title. At the end of the campaign, he made 41 appearances and scored 2 goals for Chelsea in all competitions.

==== 2011–12 season ====
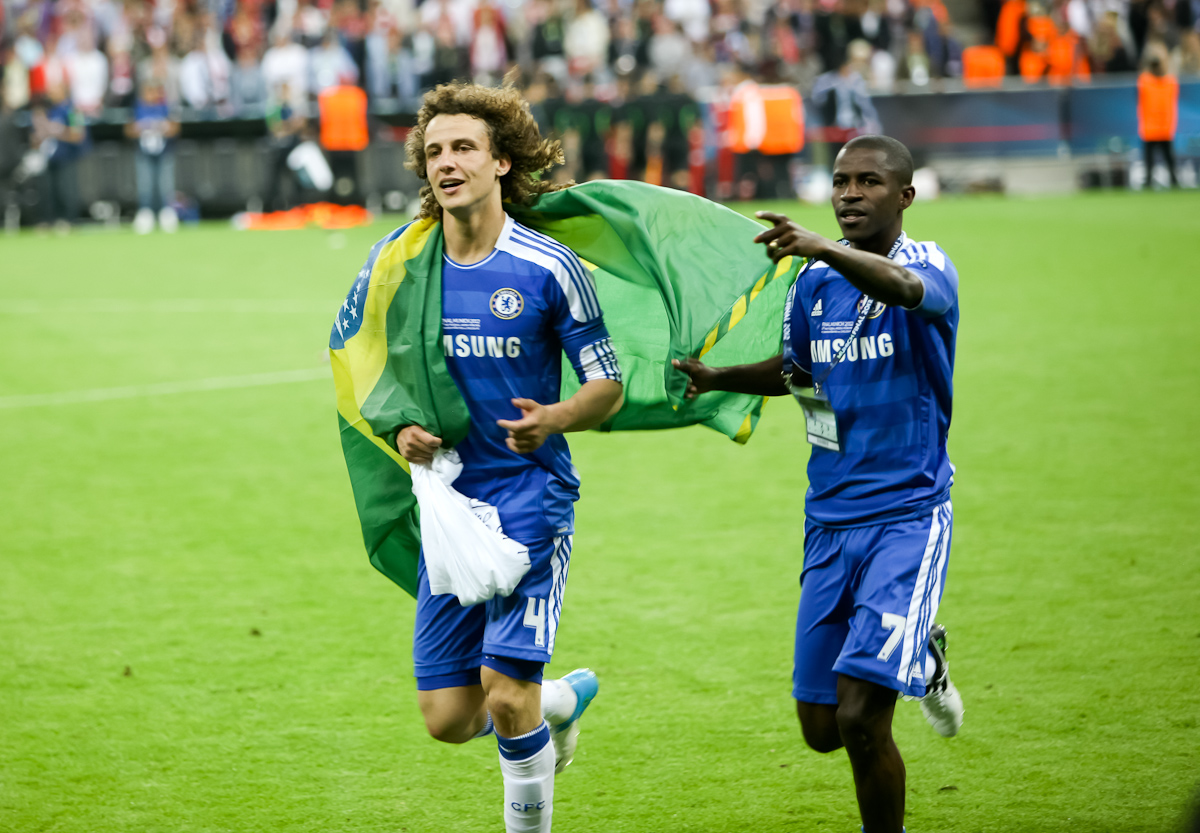
Ramires celebrating winning the Champions League title with compatriot David Luiz

On 24 September 2011, Ramires scored two goals in a 4–1 victory over Swansea City in the Premier League. He then scored a goal against Everton, sliding the ball in from a Juan Mata cross. However, he suffered a knee injury shortly after, but the match ended 3–1 for Chelsea. This was his 50th appearance for the club. On 1 November 2011, Ramires scored his first UEFA Champions League goal for Chelsea, against Genk.

Ramires scored his fifth goal of the season in a decisive Champions League encounter against Spanish side Valencia, a 3–0 victory. He scored his sixth goal of the season against Wolverhampton Wanderers in a 2–1 away win, lifting the ball from a tight position into the top left corner of the goalpost, leaving Wolves' goalkeeper Wayne Hennessey beaten. On 8 January 2012, Ramires scored his seventh and eighth goals of the 2011–12 season against Portsmouth in the FA Cup, surpassing his personal record of goals in a season. On 28 January, Ramires was stretchered off in the fourth round tie of the FA Cup against Queens Park Rangers. Two hours later, Chelsea coach André Villas-Boas revealed the Brazilian would be out for three-to-four weeks.

On 5 March 2012, Ramires signed a new five-year contract which would have kept him at Chelsea until 2017. Ramires also scored against Tottenham Hotspur in the FA Cup semi-final, helping his team defeat their rivals 5–1 on the day and progressing to the final.

On 18 April, Ramires took a pass from Frank Lampard and setup Didier Drogba's extra time goal in Chelsea's shocking 1–0 victory over Barcelona in the first leg of the Champions League semi-finals at Stamford Bridge. Ramires, already booked during the first leg, received a yellow card in the second leg at Camp Nou, which would rule him out of the final. In a performance compared to Roy Keane (who scored to inspire his team to a comeback victory in the 1999 Champions League semi-finals despite already being suspended for the final with accumulated bookings), Ramires scored a fantastic lobbed shot over Víctor Valdés to help send Chelsea through to the final as his goal leveled the aggregate score at 2–2 while putting Chelsea ahead on away goals. Assisted by Frank Lampard, this goal was later chosen as Chelsea's Goal of the Season. Chelsea teammate Fernando Torres added another goal in stoppage time to give Chelsea a 3–2 victory on aggregate and spot in the final with Bayern Munich in the final on 19 May. Unfortunately, he was not able to play in the final as he had accumulated yellow cards in the competition. Nevertheless, Chelsea emerged victorious against the Bavarians, winning 4–3 on penalties after a 1–1 draw.

On 5 May, Ramires took a pass from Juan Mata and scored at Pepe Reina's near post against Liverpool in the FA Cup Final, helping Chelsea to a 2–1 victory with the help of a second strike from Didier Drogba. Ramires later scored his fifth Premier League goal against Liverpool at Anfield; Chelsea, however, went on to lose the game 1–4.

Ramires ended a personally successful season by being nominated for the Chelsea Player of the Year award, but lost to midfielder Juan Mata. However, Ramires did win the Players' Player of the Year Award and Goal of the Year award for his chip against Barcelona, his second successive win, while scoring 12 goals, 9 assists and accumulating 4,081 minutes of playing time in 47 official appearances.

==== 2012–13 season ====
Ramires played all of the 2012 FA Community Shield and assisted Fernando Torres for the opener and filled in for Branislav Ivanović at right back after the Serbian was sent off for a foul on Aleksandar Kolarov, with the team eventually losing 2–3 to Manchester City. He scored his first goal of the 2012–13 season against Nordsjælland in the UEFA Champions League in a 0–4 away win. On 28 October 2012, he scored in a 3–2 Premier League defeat against Manchester United at Stamford Bridge. He scored again against Manchester United in Chelsea's next match on 31 October, as Chelsea overcame United 5–4 to progress to the quarter-finals of the League Cup. On 23 December, Ramires came in as a substitute for Frank Lampard and scored two goals in the last 15 minutes against Aston Villa, finishing off an emphatic 8–0 victory.

On 10 March 2013, Ramires scored yet another goal against Manchester United, the equaliser in a 2–2 draw at Old Trafford in the FA Cup sixth round. In Chelsea's second-to-last Premier League game of the season, away to Aston Villa, Ramires picked up two yellow cards in the first half and was sent off. However, Chelsea went on to win 1–2 thanks to two goals from Lampard, who set the goal-scoring record at the club with his second strike, and secured Champions League football for the 2013–14 campaign. Ramires' final appearance of the season came in the UEFA Europa League final against former club Benfica, as Chelsea won 2–1 through an injury-time Ivanović header, thus becoming the first team to hold the Champions League and Europa League trophies simultaneously.

==== Later career ====
On 24 September 2013, Ramires scored his first goal of the 2013–14 season against Swindon Town in the Football League Cup. On 28 September, he made his 100th Premier League appearance in a 1–1 draw with Tottenham Hotspur. On 1 October, he scored twice as Chelsea beat Steaua București 4–0 in the group stage of the UEFA Champions League. Ramires scored his first Premier League goal of the season on 14 December in a home game against Crystal Palace, putting Chelsea 2–1 up, which eventually proved to be the winner.

Ramires was named in the starting 11 for Chelsea's match against Crystal Palace on 3 May 2015, but was taken ill before kick-off with kidney illness. He missed the match, which Chelsea won 1–0 to win the league title. The league victory meant that, along with his teammates Gary Cahill, John Terry, Branislav Ivanović and Mikel John Obi, Ramires had won every major domestic and European trophy during his time at Chelsea.

On 29 October 2015, Ramires signed a four-year contract extension with Chelsea. However, after Guus Hiddink replaced José Mourinho as head coach of the club, Ramires found himself reserved to the substitutes' bench, even though he was in the starting line-up 15 of 23 times.

=== Jiangsu Suning ===
On 29 January 2016, Ramires joined Chinese club Jiangsu Suning on a four-year contract with the transfer fee being a reported £25 million. The fee was a Chinese record, but was broken twice in the following ten days with the acquisitions of fellow South Americans Jackson Martínez and Alex Teixeira, the latter teaming up with Ramires.

Ramires made his debut on 23 February 2016 against Binh Duong in the AFC Champions League. Ramires assisted Teixeira's opening goal, which was also his first goal for the club, but was sent off in the 94th minute of a 3–2 win against Jeonbuk Motors in the AFC Champions League for a push on a Jeonbuk player. On 5 March, Ramires scored three minutes into his Chinese Super League debut in a 3–0 win against Shandong Luneng before assisting compatriot Alex Teixeira for the second goal. On 11 June, he scored the opening goal in a 2–1 win against Shanghai Port in Shanghai.

Ramires scored his first goal of the 2017 season in the last minute of a 1–0 victory against Jeju United in the 2017 AFC Champions League group stage on 22 February 2017. On 15 March, he scored the only goal of the game against Gamba Osaka in the AFC Champions League. His first league goal of the 2017 season came in a 1–1 draw against Henan Songshan Longmen. Against Yanbian Funde on 19 August, he scored a brace in a 4–0 CSL victory. In a 1–0 victory against Tianjin Tianhai at the Nanjing Olympic Sports Centre, Ramires scored the only goal of the game and was the man of the match.

He was released from his contract on 17 May 2019, a year after making his last appearance for the club.

=== Palmeiras ===
On 13 June 2019, Ramires returned to Brazil and signed a four-year contract with reigning Brasileirão champions Palmeiras. On 28 November 2020, Ramires and Palmeiras parted ways by mutual consent.

== International career ==
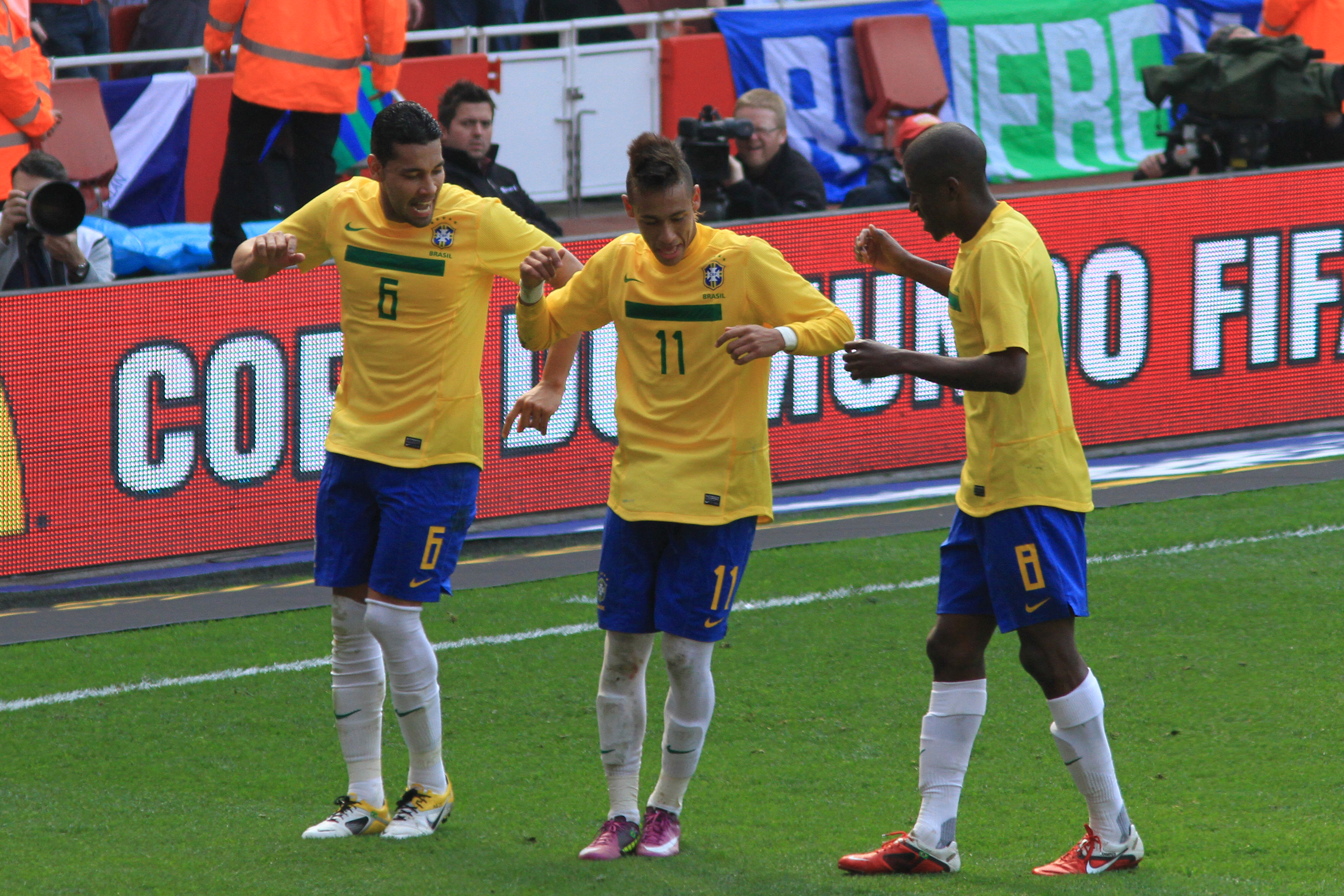
Ramires (right) celebrates Neymar's goal for Brazil against Scotland at the Emirates Stadium in March 2011 with André Santos

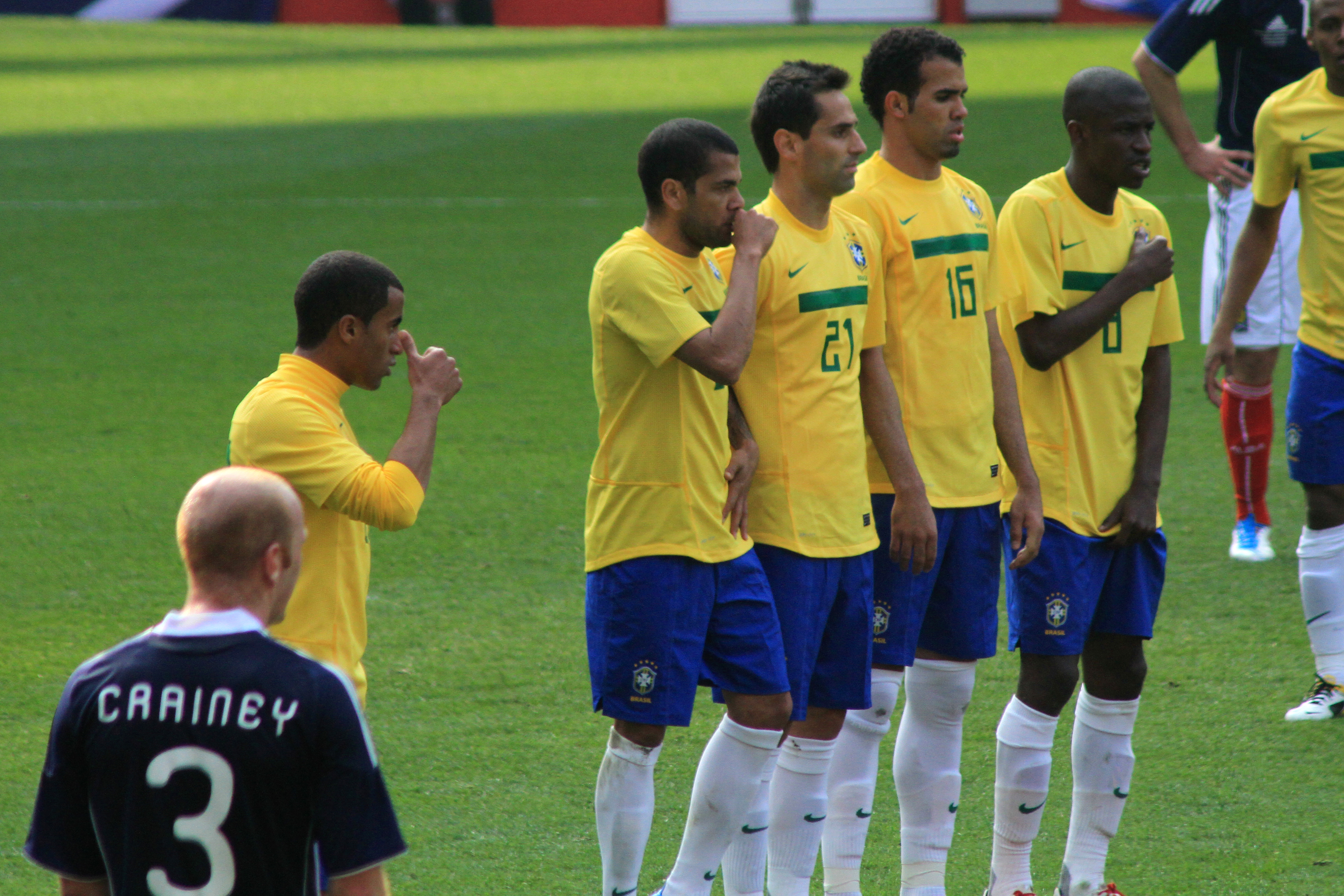
Ramires (right) playing for the Brazil against Scotland, defending a free-kick, making up the wall

On 21 July 2008, Ramires was named as the replacement for Robinho on the Brazil under-23 team for the 2008 Summer Olympics at Beijing. He appeared four times at the Olympics, as Brazil went on to earn the third-placed bronze medal.

On 21 May 2009, Ramires was called up for the first time to the Brazil national team for 2010 FIFA World Cup qualification and the 2009 FIFA Confederations Cup.

Ramires played his first match for the senior national team on 6 June 2009, a 2010 FIFA World Cup qualification game against Uruguay, in which he came as a substitute for Elano.

Ramires scored his first International goal on 7 June 2010 against Tanzania leading up to the World Cup finals in South Africa. He scored again later on in the game setting the score to 5–1. In the Round of 16 at the World Cup, he made a run past three Chilean defenders to set up Robinho for the third goal in a 3–0 victory. Dunga, the then-Brazilian head coach, blamed their quarter-final loss to the Netherlands on the absence of Ramires, who was serving suspension.

Ramires was named in a 23-man squad for the 2011 Copa América tournament held in Argentina.

On 2 June, Ramires was named in Brazil's squad for the 2014 World Cup, held in Brazil. He featured in all seven matches – two starts – as they finished in fourth place.

== Style of play ==
Ramires was a central or right-sided midfielder who was known in particular for his pace, acceleration, agility, tenacity, hard work ethic, and stamina. He was primarily played in a defensive role in the centre, but had also been employed on the right flank, due to his high work rate, which was particularly useful when his team played on the counter-attack; indeed, his ability to make late attacking runs into the penalty area from deeper areas also occasionally saw him deployed in more advanced midfield roles. In spite of his slender build, Ramires was a strong tackler, and had been called a "box-to-box midfielder", due to his overall speed, energy, consistency, ability to read the game and high work rate, which enabled him to support his teams at both ends of the pitch by breaking down opposition plays and subsequently starting an attack after winning back possession. Although not as technically skilful as his compatriots such as Neymar and Willian, he nevertheless possessed good technique, which allowed him to produce moments of attacking brilliance, as exemplified by his Goal of the Year awards while at Chelsea.

== Career statistics ==
=== Club ===
Appearances and goals by club, season and competition
Club	Season	League			National cup (Note: Includes Taça de Portugal, FA Cup, Chinese FA Cup and Copa do Brasil)		League cup (Note: Includes Taça da Liga and EFL Cup)		Continental		Other		Total	
Club	Season	Division	Apps	Goals	Apps	Goals	Apps	Goals	Apps	Goals	Apps	Goals	Apps	Goals
Joinville	2006	Série C	14	3	—		—		—		—		14	3
Cruzeiro	2007	Série A	32	3	—		—		2 (Note: Appearances in Copa Sudamericana)	0	—		34	3
Cruzeiro	2008	Série A	25	6	—		—		10 (Note: Appearances in Copa Libertadores)	5	12 (Note: Appearances in Campeonato Mineiro)	2	47	13
Cruzeiro	2009	Série A	4	1	—		—		11	1	13	7	28	9
Cruzeiro	Total		61	10	—		—		23	6	25	9	109	25
Benfica	2009–10	Primeira Liga	26	4	0	0	4	1	12 (Note: Appearances in UEFA Europa League)	0	—		42	5
Chelsea	2010–11	Premier League	29	2	3	0	1	0	8 (Note: Appearances in UEFA Champions League)	0	—		41	2
Chelsea	2011–12	Premier League	30	1	6	4	1	0	10	3	—		47	12
Chelsea	2012–13	Premier League	35	5	6	2	4	1	14 (Note: Six appearances and one goal in UEFA Champions League, eight appearances in UEFA Europa League)	1	3 (Note: One appearance in FA Community Shield, one appearance in UEFA Super Cup, one appearance in FIFA Club World Cup)	0	62	9
Chelsea	2013–14	Premier League	30	1	3	0	2	1	10	2	1 (Note: Appearance in UEFA Super Cup)	0	46	4
Chelsea	2014–15	Premier League	23	2	2	1	3	0	6	1	—		34	4
Chelsea	2015–16	Premier League	12	2	1	0	2	1	5	0	1 (Note: Appearance in FA Community Shield)	0	21	3
Chelsea	Total		159	17	21	7	13	3	53	7	5	0	251	34
Jiangsu Suning	2016	Chinese Super League	26	4	4	1	—		5 (Note: Appearances in AFC Champions League)	0	1 (Note: Appearance in Chinese FA Super Cup)	0	36	5
Jiangsu Suning	2017	Chinese Super League	23	7	3	1	—		7	4	1	0	34	12
Jiangsu Suning	2018	Chinese Super League	0	0	1	0	—		—		—		1	0
Jiangsu Suning	2019	Chinese Super League	0	0	0	0	—		—		—		0	0
Jiangsu Suning	Total		49	11	8	2	—		12	4	2	0	71	17
Palmeiras	2019	Série A	6	0	0	0	—		0	0	—		6	0
Palmeiras	2020	Série A	16	0	3	0	—		7	0	11 (Note: Appearances in Campeonato Paulista)	1	37	1
Palmeiras	Total		22	0	3	0	—		7	0	11	1	43	1
Career total			331	45	32	9	17	4	107	17	43	10	530	85

=== International ===
Appearances and goals by national team and year
National team	Year	Apps	Goals
Brazil	2009	10	0
Brazil	2010	10	2
Brazil	2011	7	0
Brazil	2012	6	1
Brazil	2013	8	1
Brazil	2014	11	0
Total		52	4

Scores and results list Brazil's goal tally first, score column indicates score after each Ramires goal.

List of international goals scored by Ramires
No.	Date	Venue	Opponent	Score	Result	Competition
1	7 June 2010	National Stadium, Dar es Salaam, Tanzania	Tanzania	3–0	5–1	Friendly
2	7 June 2010	National Stadium, Dar es Salaam, Tanzania	Tanzania	5–1	5–1	Friendly
3	10 September 2012	Estádio do Arruda, Recife, Brazil	China	1–0	8–0	Friendly
4	7 September 2013	Estádio Nacional Mané Garrincha, Brasília, Brazil	Australia	4–0	6–0	Friendly

== Honours ==
Benfica

- Primeira Liga: 2009–10
- Taça da Liga: 2009–10

Chelsea

- Premier League: 2014–15
- FA Cup: 2011–12
- Football League Cup: 2014–15
- UEFA Champions League: 2011–12
- UEFA Europa League: 2012–13

Palmeiras

- Copa do Brasil: 2020
- Campeonato Paulista: 2020
- Copa Libertadores: 2020

Brazil U23

- Olympics Bronze medal: 2008

Brazil

- FIFA Confederations Cup: 2009

Individual

- Campeonato Brasileiro Série A Team of the Year: 2008
- Bola de Prata: 2008
- Chelsea Goal of the Year: 2010–11 (vs. Manchester City), 2011–12 (vs. Barcelona)
- Chelsea Players' Player of the Year: 2011–12
