= Staffordshire Football Association =

- Formation: 1877
- Purpose: County Football Association
- Location: Staffordshire Technology Park, Beaconside, Stafford, Staffordshire, ST18 0LQ
- President: David Ramsbottom
- Chairman: Matt Hancock
- Chief Executive: Adam Evans
- Website: www.staffordshirefa.com

The Staffordshire Football Association is the governing body of football in the county of Staffordshire.
