= Building Schools for the Future =

2004–2010 UK government initiative to rebuild schools

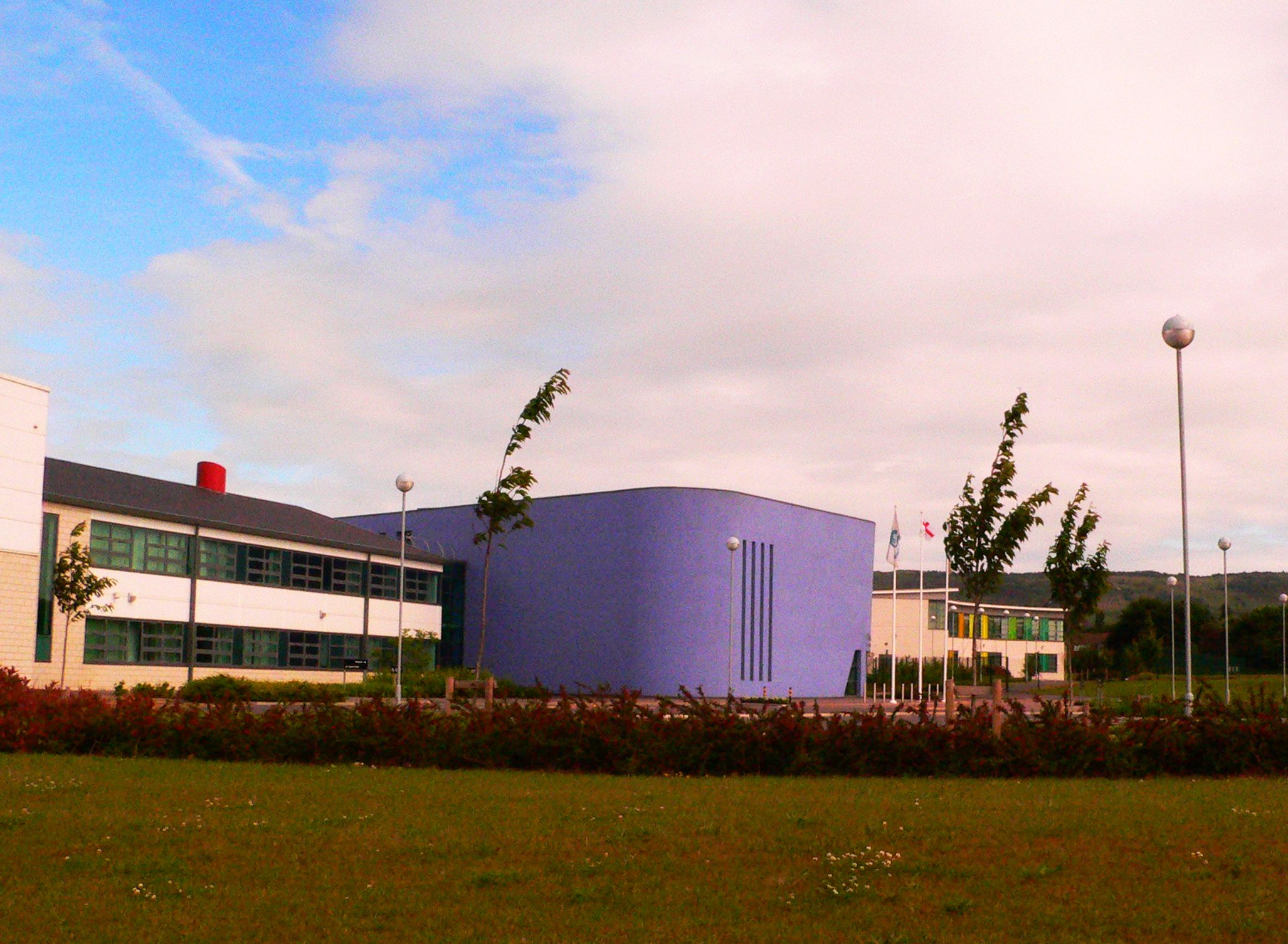
Gilbrook College, Middlesbrough, constructed under the BSF programme

Building Schools for the Future (BSF) was the name given to the British government's investment programme in secondary school buildings in England in the 2000s. Around half of the work was procured under the private finance initiative. The delivery of the programme was overseen by Partnerships for Schools (PfS), a non-departmental public body formed through a joint venture between the Department for Children, Schools and Families (DCSF), Partnerships UK and private sector partners. The programme was cancelled in 2010.

== History ==
The programme was announced by the then Prime Minister Tony Blair in 2004, with a budget of £55 billion.

The private funding element of the programme was part of the increased use of private finance initiative (PFI) funding by successive Labour governments. BSF was ambitious in its costs, timescales and objectives. Fourteen local education authorities were asked to take part in the first wave of the Building Schools for the Future programme for the fiscal year 2005/6. By December 2009, 96 local authorities had joined the programme.

In 2007 the programme was complemented by the announcement of a Primary Capital Programme, with £1.9 billion to spend on 675 building projects for primary schools in England over three years.

On 5 July 2010, in the early stages of the coalition government's austerity programme, the Secretary of State for Education, Michael Gove, announced that following a review, the programme was to be scrapped, calling it "bureaucratic and wasteful." Projects which had not achieved the status of 'financial close' would not proceed, meaning that 715 school revamps already signed up to the scheme would not go ahead. He also announced that a further 123 academy schemes were to be reviewed on a case-by-case basis. Many years later, Gove stated that cancelling the programme was his biggest mistake in office.

== Aftermath ==
A successor between 2014 and 2021 was the Priority School Building Programme, under which the government provided capital grants for the replacement or repair of over 500 schools.

As of 2020, hundreds of schools were still awaiting new buildings. In May 2022, the civil service warned the government that many school buildings were in such a state of disrepair that they posed a "threat to life".

On 31 August 2023, the Conservative government announced 147 schools were found to use RAAC in their construction, forcing schools to redistribute pupils, switch to hybrid learning, or delay the start of term. Critics have pointed to Gove's decision to scrap the BSF scheme in the drive to save money as a central factor in the delays to repairs and new builds.

== Management ==
The BSF programme had historically been dogged by sporadic or no management at the top, with Richard Bowker (Chair and Chief Executive of the Strategic Rail Authority) leaving his post after eight months. He was replaced in November 2006 by Tim Byles, who joined from Norfolk County Council, where he had been CEO for 10 years.

Initially, all Local Authorities (LAs) were placed in a national programme consisting of 15 waves. The programme did not proceed as rapidly as had been expected and both the Department for Children, Schools and Families (DCSF) and Partnerships for Schools (PfS) began looking closely at the authorities' capacity and readiness to deliver projects. During the spring of 2008, the DCSF consulted on the management of future waves of BSF and subsequently invited all LAs to submit an Expression of Interest to join the BSF programme sooner than the original programme might have indicated. The announcement of the new programme arrangements was made on 2 March 2009 and at subsequent briefings to Local Authorities it was made clear by PfS that demonstrable "readiness to deliver" was to be a key condition for future pledges of funding.

A tranche of forty authorities were invited to make a "Readiness to Deliver" submission by 8 May 2009. Of those that did, only Hampshire, Barnet, Bolton, Peterborough, Wigan and Sunderland were successful. In early August 2009 the authorities that had been unsuccessful, as well as those who had delayed making a submission, were advised that all submissions for the remaining twelve places to be allocated during the financial year ending on 31 March 2010 were to be made by 17 September 2009. On 30 November 2009 it was announced that eleven local authorities – Brent, Darlington, Devon, Havering, Kingston, Croydon, Norfolk, Plymouth, Sefton, Wakefield, and Warrington – would be joining the BSF programme for the first time, with another two – Lancashire and Tameside – starting the next phase of their BSF schemes. This brought to 96 the number of local authorities in England which were active in BSF.

The National Audit Office reviewed the programme up to December 2008. Their report found that the Department and PfS had been overly optimistic in their assumptions of how quickly the first schools could be delivered, and that scaling up the programme to deliver all 3,500 new or refurbished schools would be challenging. They found that the costs of building schools had been kept under control and were similar to most other schools, but the costs of setting up the local partnerships had been high, in part from extensive use of consultants.

The Minister for Schools announced in June 2009 that PfS was to assume responsibility for the management and delivery of all school building and refurbishment programmes. Day-to-day responsibility of all schools' capital programmes, including the Primary Capital Programme, transferred from the DCSF to PfS on 1 October 2009.

Private Eye noted high staff costs in December 2009, stating that the Chief Executive and top four directors received about £750,000 p.a. in total.

== Funding and budgets ==
=== Primary education ===
Primary schools were initially not included in BSF, although in March 2006 it was announced that a parallel programme – the Primary Capital Programme (PCP) – would be starting for primary schools and schools for primary-age special needs pupils. Rather than allocating money by authority in waves, it was intended that there will be regional pilot schemes in 2008, leading to a broader approach whereby all authorities could apply for funding from 2009. Funding to Local Authorities would only be confirmed once they had submitted and gained approval for their 'Strategy for Change' (SfC) describing how they would address the PCP priorities.

Thus 23 Local Authorities (LAs) initially had access to £6.5 million each to refurbish a primary school, before widening access to an overall budget of £1.9 billion, with an initial expectation of starting 675 primary school building projects over the following three years. In November 2008, 41 additional LAs had their Strategies for Change accepted (green status) and thus their PCP funding for 2009/10 and 2010/11 approved. 92 LAs were invited to submit further information (amber status) and only had their 2009/10 funding approved, and 15 LAs (red status) were required to address specific issues in their Strategy before any funding was approved.

=== Secondary education ===
The BSF programme involved the decentralisation of funds to local education partnerships (LEPs) to build and improve secondary school buildings. However, the LEPs were not only responsible for the construction of the buildings but also for co-ordinating and overseeing the educational transformation and community regeneration that the investment can support. The private sector LEP partner(s) were intended to introduce capital and expertise. With investments of over £2 billion in the first year, across an estimated 200 schools through the country, it was claimed as the single biggest government investment programme in education for over 50 years. The then- Prime Minister Tony Blair said the investment "will see the entire secondary school building stock upgraded and refurbished in the greatest school renewal programme in British history."

Capital funding available for investment in school buildings rose sharply from £683 million in 1996–97 to £3.8 billion in 2003–04; this further increased to £4.5 billion in 2004–05 and to £5.1 billion in 2005–06, £9.3 billion over 2008–11, and £8.2 billion in 2011, ultimately costing £45 billion over 15 years to 20 years. Funding was in 15 'waves', or groups of authorities. BSF was intended to be approximately half conventional and half Private Finance Initiative (PFI) funded. Of the £2.2 billion for BSF, £1.2 billion (55.5%) was covered by PFI credits.

Funding associated with BSF was not just limited to construction and equipment in new schools, but also improving facilities at existing schools, such as providing schools with direct capital funding to spend on buildings and Information and communications technology (ICT). Depending on their size, primary and secondary schools received about £34,000 and £113,000 respectively during 2007–08 for these initiatives, which equates to around £1 billion across English schools.

== Criticism ==
Most of the major new building works were PFI-funded, which takes the construction and facilities management (but not the educational provision) out of the financial control of local education authorities because the construction and facilities management of a school becomes a source of revenue for the consortia involved for up to 30 years, even if the school is no longer needed. While promoted as a huge investment in public services within Secondary Education, it allowed a consortium made up of a financiers, construction companies and IT companies to take away control of public assets from the local authority.

This may handicap future changes, as designers currently face difficulties in trying to predict how learning environments will evolve, exacerbated by poor levels of participation by governors, teachers, pupils, and the community in the design process. The scale of the building programme was far larger than the capacity of the available pool of experienced architects and designers, while the educators running the developments had very little prior experience of commissioning such major construction works. There was little sharing of best practice and learning between authorities, schools, contractors, suppliers and others involved in BSF, and the timescales discouraged thorough planning. The funds provided under this programme were used for materials and building infrastructure (usually including repairs and on-going maintenance) whilst funding for teaching continued in the normal way, except in the case of academies where funding came directly from the Secretary of State. A consequence of the PFI element of the programme was that recurrent and strategic maintenance of school buildings is addressed within the contract, which reverses the tendency for school governing bodies to under-allocate funds for these aspects of asset management, leading to high levels of backlog maintenance at many schools.

Bidders for funding claimed that the work to put together a bid was onerous and costly, and required the navigation of many government bodies. The co-ordinating body, Partnerships for Schools, was reportedly focused on construction procurement without a full understanding of all the other factors involved.

There were accusations that the relationship between the quality of infrastructure and the quality of pupil education was not clearly demonstrated; many of the schools at the top of the league tables were ancient schools with mostly ancient buildings. The House of Commons Select Committee expressed concerns that, whilst this investment in spaces to support learning was unprecedented, the enormous scale of the project was not being managed to ensure that its scope and aims remained appropriate. There were no clear or consistent objectives set down to judge progress, or to establish if this was the best way to spend £45 billion on education. 800 schools most in need had already been prioritised and refurbished in the years immediately before this programme started; it was unclear what the current need was, and how the money previously spent would fit in with the broad untargetted approach of BSF.

The selection of some schools for demolition and rebuilding was controversial; notably there were criticisms in the architectural press over the demolition of the brutalist Pimlico School, with many calls for the building to be protected by being placed on the register of listed buildings. The designs of 10 of the first 11 schools, including Pimlico, were granted planning permission even though they have been described by CABE as 'mediocre' or 'not yet good enough'. They noted that it was possible to be selected for a PFI scheme without a high quality design.

The upgrade programme took place at a time when building standards were being substantially rewritten to incorporate improved energy efficiency and green construction methods. Schools were alleged to emit about 15% of the public sector's carbon footprint in the UK. New schools and refurbishment projects were required to perform an assessment in accordance with the Building Research Establishment's assessment method (BREEAM) that checked against environmental performance targets for new and refurbished school buildings. However, there were concerns that commercial imperatives would mean no incentives to exceed these standards were put in place, and the subsequent works were mainly being designed against the cheaper but less energy-efficient older building standards, with very little cash being set aside to meet pending standards. To counter some of this criticism and to celebrate the many positive aspects of the BSF programme, in November 2008 Partnerships for Schools hosted the first annual "Excellence in BSF Awards", recognising a wide range of aspects of the initiative.

== Achievements ==
=== District BSF plans ===
Primary and secondary schools in the district of the Wyre Forest in Worcestershire were part of the national school upgrading process from Building Schools for the Future. The plans also involved local sponsors and LEA funding to provide £130m to rebuild, extend and modernise five secondary schools and approximately 10 primary schools. The Wyre Forest area of Worcestershire is a sub-rural settlement of three towns, Kidderminster being the largest, Stourport being the second largest and Bewdley on Severn being the smallest. The schools that were part of the BSF 2013 rebuild plans included:

- Baxter College, Kidderminster – To be rebuilt, 2013
- The Bewdley School and Sixth Form Centre – To be largely extended, refurbished and modernised, 2013
- King Charles I School – To be rebuilt, 2013
- The Stourport High School & VIth Form Centre – To be rebuilt on a new site, 2013
- Wolverley CE Secondary School – To be rebuilt, 2014

Primary schools included:

- Bewdley Primary School
- St.Johns Middle School, Kidderminster
- St. Anne's CE Primary School, Bewdley
- Stourport Primary School
- Lickhill Primary School, Stourport
- Sutton Park Primary School, Kidderminster
- St. Catherine's CE Primary School, Kidderminster
- Wolverley Sebright Primary School and Nursery, Wolverley
- Kidderminster Pupil Referral Unit

In 2008 The Bewdley School and Sixth Form Centre were provided with a £4m, state-of-the-art modular building. The look, sustainability and practicality are some of the reasons that the modular building has influenced other new major building projects including BSF, in places such as Birmingham, London and Staffordshire. The new projects in Bristol such as Bridge Learning Campus and many new primary schools have been based on the modular building at Bewdley.

=== New schools / colleges / academies ===
The BSF programme provided funding for the construction of entirely new schools and colleges, as well as rebuilding existing ones and providing ICT funding to non-BSF, new-build schools.

- Forest Oak School (Solihull Centre for Inclusive Learning), Solihull. Opened May 2006.
- Merstone School (Solihull Centre for Inclusive Learning), Solihull. Opened May 2006.
- Bamburgh School (Horsley Hill Community Campus), South Tyneside. Opened October 2006.
- Chaucer Business and Enterprise College, Sheffield. Opened October 2006.
- Bristol Brunel Academy, Bristol. Opened September 2007.
- Elmgreen School, Lambeth. Opened in temporary accommodation, September 2007.
- Haringey Sixth Form Centre, Haringey. Opened September 2007.
- Birches Head High School, Stoke-on-Trent. Opened November 2007.
- Sandon High School, Stoke-on-Trent. Opened February 2008.
- The Michael Tippett School, Lambeth. Opened in February 2008.
- Ifield School, Kent. Opened March 2008.
- Bristol Metropolitan College, Bristol. Opened April 2008.
- Canning Street Primary (delivered by BSF LEP), Newcastle. Opened May 2008.

==== 2008–2009 ====
- Kelmscott School, Waltham Forest. Opened September 2008.
- Melland (Part of Gorton Education Village), Manchester. Opened September 2008.
- Cedar Mount (part of Gorton Education Village), Manchester. Opened September 2008.
- Allerton High, Leeds. Opened September 2008.
- Newell Green High School, Manchester. Opened September 2008.
- Pudsey Grangefield, Leeds. Opened September 2008.
- Rodillian School, Leeds. Opened September 2008.
- Lanchester Academy, Solihull. Opened September 2008.
- Buttershaw School Bradford. Opened September 2008.
- Titus Salt School, Bradford. Opened September 2008.
- Tong School, Bradford. Opened September 2008.
- Brislington Enterprise College, Bristol. Opened September 2008.
- Burnley Campus, Burnley. Opened September 2008.
- Pendle Vale College, Lancashire. Opened September 2008.
- Pendle Community High School, Lancashire. Opened September 2008.
- Shuttleworth College, Burnley. Opened September 2008.
- Walbottle Campus Technology College, Newcastle. Opened September 2008.
- Walkergate and Stocksfield (primary schools delivered through BSF LEP), Newcastle. Opened September 2008.
- Frederick Bremer, Waltham Forest. Opened September 2008.
- St Paul's Catholic High School, Manchester. Opened September 2008.
- Cockburn College of Arts, Leeds. Opened September 2008.
- Penyrn College, Cornwall. Opened September 2008.
- Sinfin Community College, Derby City. Opened September 2008.
- Charlton Special School, Greenwich. Opened September 2008.
- Archbishop Grimshaw Catholic School, Birmingham. Opened October 2008.
- Park Hall School, Solihull. Opened October 2008.
- Park Campus, Lambeth. Opened November 2008.

==== 2009 ====
- Sedgehill School, Lewisham. Opened January 2009.
- St Matthew's Roman Catholic High School, Manchester. Opened January 2009.
- Christ the King Catholic and Church of England Centre for Learning, Knowsley. Opened January 2009.
- Silverdale School, Sheffield. Opened January 2009.
- Newfield Secondary School, Sheffield. Opened January 2009.
- Talbot Special School, Sheffield. Opened January 2009.
- The Bridge Learning Campus, Bristol. Opened January 2009.
- North Ridge SEN and Our Lady's RC Sports College (Higher Blackley Education Village), Manchester. Opened February 2009.
- West Jesmond Primary School (delivered through BSF LEP), Newcastle. Opened March 2009.
- Elm Court Special School, Lambeth. Opened March 2009.
- Beaumont Leys, Leicester. Opened April 2009.
- Catford School, Lewisham. Opened April 2009.
- Durham Johnston School, Durham. Opened April 2009.
- Stockwell Park, Lambeth. Opened April 2009.
- Chessington Community College, Kingston upon Thames. Opened April 2009.
- Buglawton Residential, Manchester. Opened May 2009.
- Judgemeadow Community College, Leicester. Opened June 2009.
- Rushey Mead School, Leicester. Opened 18 June 2012.
- Soar Valley College Leicester. Opened June 2009.
- St George's Church of England Foundation School, Kent. Opened June 2009.
- The Bulwell Academy, Bulwell, Nottingham. Opened August 2009, new building opened August 2010.
- Sir John Thursby Community College, Burnley. Opened September 2009.
- Huyton Arts and Sports, Centre for Learning. Opened September 2009.
- Marsden Heights Community College, Brierfield. Opened September 2010.
- Blessed Trinity RC Community College, Burnley. Opened September 2010.
- Hameldon Community College, Burnley. Opened September 2010.
- Kingsway Park High School, Rochdale. Opened September 2010.
- Rochdale Sixth Form College, Rochdale. Opened September 2010.
- Unity College, Burnley. Opened September 2010.
- Heartlands High School, Wood Green, Opened September 2010.
- Hope Academy, Newton-le-Willows. Opened September 2011.

=== Rebuilt schools / colleges / academies ===
- All Saints College, Newcastle. Opened September 2006.
- Parkside School, Bradford. Opened October 2006.
- The Challenge College, Bradford. Opened October 2006.
- Oxclose Community School, Sunderland. Opened June 2007.
- Brockington College, Leicester. Opened November 2007.
- Prendergast – Ladywell Fields College, Lewisham. Opened January 2008.
- Benfield School, Newcastle. Opened September 2008.
- Temple Moor High School, Leeds. Opened September 2008.
- Yewlands Technology College, Sheffield. Opened October 2008.
- Pendle Vale College, Nelson. Completed 2008.
- Fullhurst Community College, Leicester. Opened January 2009.
- Kingsmeadow Community School, Gateshead. Opened September 2009.
- Torquay Community College. Completed 2010.
- St. Marylebone CE School, London. Refurbishment and new building completed 2010.
- Hadden Park High School, Nottingham. Opened April 2009.
- Teddington School, Teddington, Richmond upon Thames. Opened September 2010.
- Sedgefield Community College, Sedgefield, County Durham. Completed in 2011.
- Sirius Academy and Ganton School, Hull. Opened September 2011.
- Archbishop Sentamu Academy, Hull. Opened September 2011.
- The Regis School, Bognor Regis, West Sussex. Opened September 2010.
- Winifred Holtby School, Hull. Opened September 2011.
- Lister Community School, London. Opened September 2011.
- Tweendykes Special School, Hull. Opened September 2011.
- Thomas Tallis School, Greenwich. Opened November 2011.
- Kelvin Hall School, Hull. Opened April 2012.
- Witton Park High School, Blackburn. Opened September 2012.
- Malet Lambert School, Hull. Opened September 2012.
- Derby Moor Community Sports College Trust, Derby. Opened September 2012.
- Noel-Baker Community School, Derby. Opened September 2012.
- Dene Community School, Peterlee. Opened November 2012.
- Rainford High Technology College, St Helens. Opened September 2013.

=== ICT-only schools, colleges and academies ===
- Wright Robinson, Manchester. Opened September 2007.
- Sacred Heart, Newcastle. Opened September 2007.
- Gosforth East, Newcastle. Opened September 2007.
- Gosforth Central Academy, Newcastle. Opened September 2007.
- Forest Hill, Lewisham. Opened January 2008.
- Greenvale School, Lewisham. Opened January 2008.
- New Woodlands, Lewisham. Opened January 2008.
- Thomas Bewick, Newcastle. Opened June 2008.
- Lord Lawson of Beamish, South Tyneside and Gateshead. Opened June 2008.
- Boldon, South Tyneside and Gateshead. Opened September 2008.
- Kings Meadow, South Tyneside and Gateshead. Opened September 2008.
- Kenton, Newcastle. Opened November 2008.
- South Leeds High, Leeds. Opened April 2009.
- Ralph Thoresby High, Leeds. Opened April 2009.
- John Smeaton Community College, Leeds. Opened April 2009.
- Cardinal Heenan Catholic High School, Leeds. Opened April 2009.

A number of BSF schools were funded as "One School Pathfinders", in Local Authorities that were in later waves of the programme. These projects helped to build capacity and competence in those authorities, as well as to provide exemplars in sustainability and science ("Project Faraday").

== See also ==
- Education in the United Kingdom
