= King's Meadow =

King's Meadow, Kings Meadow or Kingsmeadow may refer to:

- Kingsmeadow (stadium), a football stadium in Kingston upon Thames, London, England
- King's Meadow, Nottinghamshire, a nature reserve in Nottinghamshire, England
- King's Meadow, Reading, a riverside public park in Reading, England
- King's Meadow Campus, a campus of the University of Nottingham, England
- Kings Meadow Island, a former island in the River Tyne, Northumberland, England
- Kings Meadows, Tasmania, a suburb of Launceston, Tasmania, Australia
- Kingsmeadow Community Comprehensive School, a school in Gateshead, England
