= 2011–12 FA Cup =

Tournament details
- Country: England; Wales
- Teams: 763

Final positions
- Champions: Chelsea (7th title)
- Runners-up: Liverpool

Tournament statistics
- Matches played: 152
- Attendance: 2,013,407 (13,246 per match)
- Top goal scorer: Jermaine Beckford (6)

The 2011–12 FA Cup (also known as the FA Cup with Budweiser for sponsorship reasons) was the 131st season of the world's oldest football knock-out competition, the FA Cup. The closing date for applications was 1 April 2011, and saw 825 clubs apply to enter. On 8 July 2011, the FA announced that 763 clubs had been accepted, which remains, as of 2025/26, the record number of entrants. The final was played on 5 May 2012 at Wembley Stadium. Chelsea won their fourth title in 6 years, and seventh overall, with a 2–1 victory over Liverpool.

This is the first season in which the tournament was sponsored by Budweiser. Premier League side Manchester City were the defending champions, but they were eliminated by local rivals Manchester United in the third round.

The competition was overshadowed by the collapse of Bolton Wanderers midfielder Fabrice Muamba during their sixth round match with Tottenham Hotspur. Muamba went into cardiac arrest on the pitch and, following failed attempts to resuscitate him, was taken to the London Chest Hospital, where he went on to recover despite his heart stopping for over 75 minutes. The match was subsequently abandoned. On 27 March the match was replayed, with Tottenham winning 3–1. Muamba attended the final to congratulate Chelsea.

The winners of the competition would have earned a place in the group stage of the 2012–13 UEFA Europa League. However, since Chelsea went on to win the 2011–12 UEFA Champions League, they qualified for the 2012–13 UEFA Champions League as the title holders. The FA Cup berth for European qualification was not exercised as runners-up Liverpool had already won that season's League Cup and Tottenham Hotspur, the fourth-place finishers in the Premier League, lost their Champions League spot at the expense of sixth-placed Chelsea, as no association was allowed more than four entrants in the competition at the time and so were compensated by UEFA with a place in the Europa League group stage.

== Teams ==
Round	Clubs remaining	Clubs involved	Winners from previous round	New entries this round	Leagues entering at this round
First round proper	124	80	32	48	EFL League One; EFL League Two
Second round proper	84	40	40	none	none
Third round proper	64	64	20	44	Premier League; EFL Championship
Fourth round proper	32	32	32	none	none
Fifth round proper	16	16	16	none	none
Quarter-finals	8	8	8	none	none
Semi-finals	4	4	4	none	none
Final	2	2	2	none	none

== Calendar ==
The calendar for the 2011–12 FA Cup, as announced by The Football Association:

Round	Main date	Number of fixtures	Clubs	New entries this round	Prize money
Extra preliminary round	20 August 2011	204	763 → 559	408: 356th–763rd	£750
Preliminary round	3 September 2011	167	559 → 392	130: 226th–355th	£1,500
First round qualifying	17 September 2011	116	392 → 276	65: 161st–225th	£3,000
Second round qualifying	1 October 2011	80	276 → 196	44: 117th–160th	£4,500
Third round qualifying	15 October 2011	40	196 → 156	none	£7,500
Fourth round qualifying	29 October 2011	32	156 → 124	24: 93rd–116th	£12,500
First round proper	12 November 2011	40	124 → 84	48: 45th–92nd	£18,000
Second round proper	3 December 2011	20	84 → 64	none	£27,000
Third round proper	7 January 2012	32	64 → 32	44: 1st–44th	£67,500
Fourth round proper	28 January 2012	16	32 → 16	none	£90,000
Fifth round proper	18 February 2012	8	16 → 8	none	£180,000
Sixth round proper	17 March 2012	4	8 → 4	none	£360,000
Semi-finals	14–15 April 2012	2	4 → 2	none	Losers £450,000; Winners £900,000
Final	5 May 2012	1	2 → 1	none	Runner-up £900,000; Winner £1,800,000

== Qualifying rounds ==
All teams that entered the competition, but were not members of the Premier League or The Football League, competed in the qualifying rounds to secure one of 32 places available in the first round proper.

The winners from the fourth qualifying round were Tamworth, Blyth Spartans, Stourbridge, Bradford Park Avenue, Gateshead, Wrexham, Fleetwood Town, Grimsby Town, Nantwich Town, Alfreton Town, Southport, Corby Town, AFC Telford United, Hinckley United, Barrow, FC Halifax Town, East Thurrock United, Salisbury City, Chelmsford City, Bath City, Maidenhead United, Sutton United, Cambridge United, Oxford City, AFC Totton, Basingstoke Town, Luton Town, Arlesey Town, Bromley, Kettering Town, Redbridge and Newport County.

Nantwich Town, East Thurrock United, AFC Totton and Arlesey Town were appearing in the competition proper for the first time. FC Halifax Town was also appearing at this stage for the first time in their own right, only three seasons after the winding up of the original Halifax Town AFC. Of the others, Bradford Park Avenue and Redbridge were the only clubs not to have featured in the first round of the FA Cup at least once in the previous five seasons, having last done so back in 2003-04.

== First round proper ==
Teams from Leagues One and Two entered at this stage, along with the winners from the fourth round qualifying. The draw was made on 30 October 2011 and ties were played on the weekend of 12–13 November 2011. Redbridge, from the 8th tier of English football, were the lowest ranked football team to make it through to the first round proper.

- Player of the round: Stefan Brown (AFC Totton, 38% of the vote).
  The other nominees were: Adam Watkins (Luton Town, 24%), Nahki Wells (Bradford City, 21%), Jamie Vardy (Fleetwood Town, 14%) and George Williams (MK Dons, 3%).

11 November 2011	Cambridge United (5)	2−2	Wrexham (5)	Abbey Stadium, Cambridge
19:45 GMT	Coulson 53', 90+2'	Report	Morrell 20', 60'	Attendance: 2,792; Referee: John Hopkins

22 November 2011 Replay	Wrexham (5)	2−1	Cambridge United (5)	Racecourse Ground, Wrexham
19:45 GMT	Pogba 59'; Wright 76'	Report	Wylde 87'	Attendance: 2,606; Referee: Ross Joyce

12 November 2011	Newport County (5)	0−1	Shrewsbury Town (4)	Newport Stadium, Newport
12:30 GMT		Report	Gornell 41'	Attendance: 2,362; Referee: Darren Drysdale

12 November 2011	Brentford (3)	1−0	Basingstoke Town (6)	Griffin Park, London
13:00 GMT	Saunders 9'	Report		Attendance: 3,553; Referee: Masaaki Toma

12 November 2011	East Thurrock United (7)	0−3	Macclesfield Town (4)	Rookery Hill, Corringham
14:00 GMT		Report	Tremarco 43'; Hamshaw 61'; Donnelly 65'	Attendance: 1,207; Referee: Darren Sheldrake

12 November 2011	Hereford United (4)	0−3	Yeovil Town (3)	Edgar Street, Hereford
15:00 GMT		Report	Upson 25'; A. Williams 57'; Blizzard 72'	Attendance: 2,469; Referee: Paul Tierney

12 November 2011	Bury (3)	0−2	Crawley Town (4)	Gigg Lane, Bury
15:00 GMT		Report	Barnett 49'; Doughty 82'	Attendance: 2,436; Referee: Mark Brown

12 November 2011	Luton Town (5)	1−0	Northampton Town (4)	Kenilworth Road, Luton
15:00 GMT	Watkins 80'	Report		Attendance: 4,799; Referee: Andy D'Urso

12 November 2011	Swindon Town (4)	4−1	Huddersfield Town (3)	County Ground, Swindon
15:00 GMT	Flint 36'; De Vita 39'; Kerrouche 76'; Ferry 87'	Report	Novak 22'	Attendance: 5,728; Referee: Phil Gibbs

12 November 2011	Redbridge (8)	0−0	Oxford City (7)	Oakside, London
15:00 GMT		Report		Attendance: 465; Referee: Tim Robinson

22 November 2011 Replay	Oxford City (7)	1−2 (a.e.t.)	Redbridge (8)	Court Place Farm, Marston
19:45 GMT	Steele 20'	Report	Gordon 70' (pen.); Bradbury 102'	Attendance: 1,175; Referee: Andy Davies

12 November 2011	Bristol Rovers (4)	3−1	Corby Town (6)	Memorial Stadium, Bristol
15:00 GMT	McGleish 26' (pen.); Carayol 74'; Zebroski 90'	Report	Reynolds 62'	Attendance: 3,787; Referee: Andy Davies

12 November 2011	Oldham Athletic (3)	3−1	Burton Albion (4)	Boundary Park, Oldham
15:00 GMT	Kuqi 4' (pen.); Simpson 13'; Furman 35'	Report	Zola 71'	Attendance: 3,102; Referee: Michael Naylor

12 November 2011	Preston North End (3)	0−0	Southend United (4)	Deepdale, Preston
15:00 GMT		Report		Attendance: 6,609; Referee: Nigel Miller

22 November 2011 Replay	Southend United (4)	1−0	Preston North End (3)	Roots Hall, Southend-on-Sea
19:45 GMT	Dickinson 55'	Report		Attendance: 4,537; Referee: Darren Deadman

12 November 2011	Dagenham & Redbridge (4)	1−1	Bath City (5)	Victoria Road, London
15:00 GMT	Woodall 41'	Report	Canham 11'	Attendance: 1,225; Referee: Graham Scott

23 November 2011 Replay	Bath City (5)	1–3 (a.e.t.)	Dagenham & Redbridge (4)	Twerton Park, Bath
19:45 GMT	Connolly 71'	Report	Woodall 20'; Nurse 100', 115'	Attendance: 1,704; Referee: Iain Williamson

12 November 2011	Hartlepool United (3)	0−1	Stevenage (3)	Victoria Park, Hartlepool
15:00 GMT		Report	Laird 10' (pen.)	Attendance: 2,744; Referee: Mark Heywood

12 November 2011	Blyth Spartans (6)	0−2	Gateshead (5)	Croft Park, Blyth
15:00 GMT		Report	Shaw 14'; Cummins 54'	Attendance: 2,763; Referee: Darren Bond

12 November 2011	Alfreton Town (5)	0−4	Carlisle United (3)	North Street, Alfreton
15:00 GMT		Report	Miller 24'; Loy 33'; Berrett 41'; Noble 45'	Attendance: 1,488; Referee: Eddie Ilderton

12 November 2011	Chesterfield (3)	1−3	Torquay United (4)	B2net Stadium, Chesterfield
15:00 GMT	Bowery 59'	Report	Stevens 20'; Howe 72'; Nicholson 88'	Attendance: 4,332; Referee: Carl Berry

12 November 2011	Crewe Alexandra (4)	1−4	Colchester United (3)	Alexandra Stadium, Crewe
15:00 GMT	Moore 19'	Report	James 60', 90+2'; Bond 77'; Coker 87'	Attendance: 2,325; Referee: David Coote

12 November 2011	Tranmere Rovers (3)	0−1	Cheltenham Town (4)	Prenton Park, Tranmere
15:00 GMT		Report	Duffy 21' (pen.)	Attendance: 3,211; Referee: Craig Pawson

12 November 2011	Chelmsford City (6)	4−0	AFC Telford United (5)	Melbourne Stadium, Chelmsford
15:00 GMT	Palmer 11'; Parker 45+1'; Rainford 63' (pen.), 87'	Report		Attendance: 1,430; Referee: Declan Ford

12 November 2011	Hinckley United (6)	2−2	Tamworth (5)	De Montfort Park, Hinckley
15:00 GMT	Gray 78'; Kerry 88'	Report	Christie 83' (pen.); Patterson 90+2'	Attendance: 1,906; Referee: Richard West

22 November 2011 Replay	Tamworth (5)	1−0	Hinckley United (6)	The Lamb Ground, Tamworth
19:45 GMT	St Aimie 90'	Report		Attendance: 1,583; Referee: Bond

12 November 2011	Exeter City (3)	1−1	Walsall (3)	St James Park, Exeter
15:00 GMT	Noble 90+4'	Report	Wilson 21'	Attendance: 3,026; Referee: James Linington

23 November 2011 Replay	Walsall (3)	3–2 (a.e.t.)	Exeter City (3)	Bescot Stadium, Walsall
19:45 GMT	Macken 64'; Nicholls 69'; Bowerman 98'	Report	Logan 41'; Frear 77'	Attendance: 2,089; Referee: Dean Mohareb

12 November 2011	Bradford City (4)	1−0	Rochdale (3)	Valley Parade, Bradford
15:00 GMT	Wells 84'	Report		Attendance: 3,579; Referee: Dean Mohareb

12 November 2011	Notts County (3)	4−1	Accrington Stanley (4)	Meadow Lane, Nottingham
15:00 GMT	Hawley 34', 89'; Judge 47'; Sheehan 80'	Report	Joyce 82'	Attendance: 3,613; Referee: Gavin Ward

12 November 2011	Port Vale (4)	0−0	Grimsby Town (5)	Vale Park, Stoke-on-Trent
15:00 GMT		Report		Attendance: 4,450; Referee: Jeremy Simpson

22 November 2011 Replay	Grimsby Town (5)	1−0	Port Vale (4)	Blundell Park, Cleethorpes
19:45 GMT	Makofo 59'	Report		Attendance: 1,906; Referee: Jock Waugh

12 November 2011	Sheffield United (3)	3−0	Oxford United (4)	Bramall Lane, Sheffield
15:00 GMT	Evans 12', 19'; Flynn 71'	Report		Attendance: 7,991; Referee: Carl Boyeson

12 November 2011	Sutton United (6)	1−0	Kettering Town (5)	Gander Green Lane, London
15:00 GMT	Watkins 64'	Report		Attendance: 1,532; Referee: Michael Bull

12 November 2011	AFC Bournemouth (3)	3−3	Gillingham (4)	Dean Court, Bournemouth
15:00 GMT	Purches 20'; Zubar 59'; Malone 60'	Report	Payne 37'; Jackman 71'; Kedwell 90'	Attendance: 4,282; Referee: Dave Phillips

22 November 2011 Replay	Gillingham (4)	3−2	AFC Bournemouth (3)	Priestfield Stadium, Gillingham
19:45 GMT	Weston 21'; Richards 75'; S. Payne 82'	Report	Frampton 55' (o.g.); Arter 90+1'	Attendance: 4,321; Referee: Fred Graham

12 November 2011	Milton Keynes Dons (3)	6−0	Nantwich Town (7)	Stadium mk, Milton Keynes
15:00 GMT	Doumbé 28'; Bowditch 30', 54'; Powell 66'; O'Shea 76'; G. Williams 90'	Report		Attendance: 4,110; Referee: Keith Stroud

12 November 2011	AFC Totton (7)	8−1	Bradford Park Avenue (7)	Testwood Stadium, Totton and Eling
15:00 GMT	Davies 13', 90+4'; Gosney 29' (pen.), 52'; Charles 32'; Brown 64', 74', 79'	Report	Clayton 30'	Attendance: 2,315; Referee: Kevin Johnson

12 November 2011	Leyton Orient (3)	3−0	Bromley (6)	Brisbane Road, London
15:00 GMT	Spring 7'; Porter 57'; Smith 79'	Report		Attendance: 4,452; Referee: Gary Sutton

12 November 2011	AFC Wimbledon (4)	0−0	Scunthorpe United (3)	Kingsmeadow, London
15:00 GMT		Report		Attendance: 2,933; Referee: Dean Whitestone

22 November 2011 Replay	Scunthorpe United (3)	0−1	AFC Wimbledon (4)	Glanford Park, Scunthorpe
19:45 GMT		Report	L. Moore 66'	Attendance: 2,036; Referee: Graham Salisbury

12 November 2011	Salisbury City (6)	3−1	Arlesey Town (7)	Raymond McEnhill Stadium, Salisbury
15:00 GMT	Fitchett 12'; Read 55' (pen.); Kelly 89'	Report	Sinclair 41'	Attendance: 1,298; Referee: Wayne Barratt

12 November 2011	Maidenhead United (6)	1−1	Aldershot Town (4)	York Road, Maidenhead
15:00 GMT	Thomas 7'	Report	Rankine 78'	Attendance: 2,281; Referee: Andy Woolmer

22 November 2011 Replay	Aldershot Town (4)	2−0	Maidenhead United (6)	Recreation Ground, Aldershot
19:45 GMT	Rodman 15'; Guttridge 34'	Report		Attendance: 2,181; Referee: Dean Whitestone

12 November 2011	Fleetwood Town (5)	2−0	Wycombe Wanderers (3)	Highbury Stadium, Fleetwood
15:00 GMT	Mangan 25'; Vardy 80'	Report		Attendance: 2,711; Referee: Andy Haines

12 November 2011	Barrow (5)	1−2	Rotherham United (4)	Holker Street, Barrow
15:00 GMT	Rutherford 16'	Report	Grabban 82', 87' (pen.)	Attendance: 3,030; Referee: James Adcock

12 November 2011	Southport (5)	1−2	Barnet (4)	Haig Avenue. Southport
15:00 GMT	Akrigg 71'	Report	Kamdjo 59'; Taylor 90+3'	Attendance: 1,939; Referee: Andrew Madley

12 November 2011	Plymouth Argyle (4)	3−3	Stourbridge (7)	Home Park, Plymouth
15:00 GMT	Feeney 4'; Fletcher 70'; Bhasera 88'	Report	Drake 37'; Rowe 53'; Gebbis 82' (pen.)	Attendance: 6,173; Referee: Simon Hooper

22 November 2011 Replay	Stourbridge (7)	2−0	Plymouth Argyle (4)	War Memorial Athletic Ground, Amblecote
19:45 GMT	McCone 52'; Evans 73'	Report		Attendance: 2,519; Referee: Scott Mathieson

13 November 2011	FC Halifax Town (6)	0–4	Charlton Athletic (3)	The Shay, Halifax
12:30 GMT		Report	Taylor 40'; Jackson 80'; Hollands 82'; Pritchard 90'	Attendance: 4,601; Referee: Geoff Eltringham

13 November 2011	Morecambe (4)	1–2	Sheffield Wednesday (3)	Globe Arena, Morecambe
15:15 GMT	Wilson 62' (pen.)	Report	Lines 18'; O'Grady 52'	Attendance: 4,160; Referee: David Webb

== Second round proper ==
The winners of the first round matches advanced to this stage. The draw was made on 13 November 2011 with the ties played on the weekend of 3–4 December 2011.

Redbridge, from the 8th tier of English football, were the lowest ranked football team to make it to the second round proper.

- Player of the Round: Stuart Nelson (Notts County, 43% of the vote).
  The other nominees were: Matt Tubbs (Crawley Town, 24%), Jamie Tolley (Wrexham, 17%), Matt Ritchie (Swindon Town, 13%) and Jon Nurse (Dagenham & Redbridge, 3%).

2 December 2011	Fleetwood Town (5)	2–2	Yeovil Town (3)	Highbury Stadium, Fleetwood
19:30 GMT	Charnock 82'; Milligan 89' (pen.)	Report	Upson 32'; Clifford 49'	Attendance: 3,319; Referee: Robert Madley

13 December 2011 Replay	Yeovil Town (3)	0–2	Fleetwood Town (5)	Huish Park, Yeovil
19:30 GMT		Report	McGuire 28'; Vardy 90+1'	Attendance: 3,276; Referee: James Adcock

3 December 2011	Salisbury City (6)	0–0	Grimsby Town (5)	Raymond McEnhill Stadium, Salisbury
15:00 GMT		Report		Attendance: 2,161; Referee: Lee Collins

13 December 2011 Replay	Grimsby Town (5)	2–3 (a.e.t.)	Salisbury City (6)	Blundell Park, Cleethorpes
19:45 GMT	Duffy 90+2', 92'	Report	Fitchett 46'; Dutton 100'; Anderson 113' (pen.)	Attendance: 1,880; Referee: Geoff Eltringham

3 December 2011	Stourbridge (7)	0–3	Stevenage (3)	War Memorial Athletic Ground, Amblecote
15:00 GMT		Report	Beardsley 65', 77'; Shroot 90+1'	Attendance: 3,067; Referee: Gavin Ward

3 December 2011	Sheffield United (3)	3–2	Torquay United (4)	Bramall Lane, Sheffield
15:00 GMT	Ellis 68' (o.g.); Evans 69', 78'	Report	Howe 3'; Stevens 90+4'	Attendance: 10,105; Referee: Chris Sarginson

3 December 2011	Colchester United (3)	0–1	Swindon Town (4)	Colchester Community Stadium, Colchester
15:00 GMT		Report	Ritchie 59'	Attendance: 3,039; Referee: Michael Naylor

3 December 2011	Chelmsford City (6)	1–1	Macclesfield Town (4)	Melbourne Stadium, Chelmsford
15:00 GMT	Cornhill 35'	Report	Diagne 64'	Attendance: 3,919; Referee: Mark Haywood

14 December 2011 Replay	Macclesfield Town (4)	1–0	Chelmsford City (6)	Moss Rose, Macclesfield
20:05 GMT	Tremarco 26'	Report		Attendance: 1,607; Referee: Darren Drysdale

3 December 2011	Leyton Orient (3)	0–1	Gillingham (4)	Brisbane Road, London
15:00 GMT		Report	Weston 45+1'	Attendance: 3,763; Referee: Phil Gibbs

3 December 2011	Crawley Town (4)	5–0	Redbridge (8)	Broadfield Stadium, Crawley
15:00 GMT	Tubbs 31' (pen.), 36', 79' (pen.); Drury 83'; McFadzean 90+5'	Report		Attendance: 2,494; Referee: Steve Rushton

3 December 2011	Luton Town (5)	2–4	Cheltenham Town (4)	Kenilworth Road, Luton
15:00 GMT	O'Connor 40', 51'	Report	Duffy 2'; Pack 45'; Summerfield 64'; Penn 90+3'	Attendance: 4,516; Referee: Colin Webster

3 December 2011	Brentford (3)	0–1	Wrexham (5)	Griffin Park, London
15:00 GMT		Report	Tolley 33'	Attendance: 3,452; Referee: Roger East

3 December 2011	Bradford City (4)	3–1	AFC Wimbledon (4)	Valley Parade, Bradford
15:00 GMT	Hannah 9'; Bush 14' (o.g.); Fagan 70' (pen.)	Report	Midson 50'	Attendance: 3,432; Referee: Nigel Miller

3 December 2011	Shrewsbury Town (4)	2–1	Rotherham United (4)	New Meadow, Shrewsbury
15:00 GMT	Sharps 48'; Wroe 83' (pen.)	Report	Grabban 42' (pen.)	Attendance: 4,048; Referee: Lee Collins

3 December 2011	Dagenham & Redbridge (4)	1–1	Walsall (3)	Victoria Road, London
15:00 GMT	Nurse 81'	Report	Gnakpa 76'	Attendance: 1,237; Referee: Darren Deadman

13 December 2011 Replay	Walsall (3)	0–0 (a.e.t.) (2-3 p)	Dagenham & Redbridge (4)	Bescot Stadium, Walsall
19:45 GMT		Report		Attendance: 1,802; Referee: Eddie Ilderton
	Penalties
	Macken (penalty scored); Nicholls (penalty missed); Gnakpa (penalty missed); Bowerman (penalty scored); Beevers (penalty missed)		Spillane (penalty scored); Rose (penalty missed); Elito (penalty scored); Woodall (penalty scored)

3 December 2011	Barnet (4)	1–3	Milton Keynes Dons (3)	Underhill Stadium, London
15:00 GMT	McLeod 87'	Report	Potter 39'; MacDonald 78'; Powell 88'	Attendance: 2,608; Referee: Rob Lewis

3 December 2011	Gateshead (5)	1–2	Tamworth (5)	Gateshead International Stadium, Gateshead
15:00 GMT	Fisher 62'	Report	Francis 29'; Patterson 90'	Attendance: 1,163; Referee: Paul Tierney

3 December 2011	Sheffield Wednesday (3)	1–0	Aldershot Town (4)	Hillsborough Stadium, Sheffield
15:00 GMT	Lowe 49'	Report		Attendance: 10,162; Referee: Graham Salisbury

3 December 2011	Southend United (4)	1–1	Oldham Athletic (3)	Roots Hall, Southend-on-Sea
15:00 GMT	Hall 67'	Report	Wesolowski 39'	Attendance: 4,613; Referee: David Webb

13 December 2011 Replay	Oldham Athletic (3)	1–0	Southend United (4)	Boundary Park, Oldham
19:45 GMT	Taylor 58'	Report		Attendance: 4,207; Referee: Gary Sutton

3 December 2011	Charlton Athletic (3)	2–0	Carlisle United (3)	The Valley, London
15:00 GMT	Morrison 64'; Euell 90+1'	Report		Attendance: 7,461; Referee: A Madley

4 December 2011	AFC Totton (7)	1−6	Bristol Rovers (4)	Testwood Stadium, Totton
12:30 GMT	Sherborne 71'	Report	Anyinsah 8'; Carayol 10'; Woodards 13'; Anthony 64'; Richards 72', 90+2'	Attendance: 2,236; Referee: Woolmer

4 December 2011	Sutton United (6)	0–2	Notts County (3)	Gander Green Lane, London
17:00 GMT		Report	J. Hughes 35', 90+1'	Attendance: 3,704; Referee: Pawson

== Third round proper ==
The winners of the second round matches played alongside all twenty teams from the Barclays Premier League and all twenty four teams from the Championship. The draw was made on 4 December 2011, with the ties scheduled to be played on 6, 7, 8, and 9 January 2012. Salisbury City, from the sixth tier, were the lowest ranked club in the third round proper.

- Player of the Round: Hatem Ben Arfa (Newcastle United, 43% of the vote).
  The other nominees were: Adrian Cieslewicz (Wrexham, 24%), Matt Phillips (Blackpool, 19%), Matt Ritchie (Swindon Town, 12%) and Arnaud Mendy (Macclesfield Town, 3%).

6 January 2012	Liverpool (1)	5–1	Oldham Athletic (3)	Anfield, Liverpool
20:00	Bellamy 30'; Gerrard 45+1' (pen.); Shelvey 68'; Carroll 89'; Downing 90+5'	Report	Simpson 28'	Attendance: 44,556; Referee: Neil Swarbrick

7 January 2012	Birmingham City (2)	0–0	Wolverhampton Wanderers (1)	St Andrew's, Birmingham
12:30		Report		Attendance: 14,594; Referee: Mike Dean

18 January 2012 Replay	Wolverhampton Wanderers (1)	0–1	Birmingham City (2)	Molineux Stadium, Wolverhampton
20:00		Report	Elliott 74'	Attendance: 10,153; Referee: Howard Webb

7 January 2012	Dagenham & Redbridge (4)	0−0	Millwall (2)	Victoria Road, London
13:00		Report		Attendance: 3,396; Referee: Graham Salisbury

17 January 2012 Replay	Millwall (2)	5−0	Dagenham & Redbridge (4)	The Den, London
19:45	Henderson 7', 59', 63' (pen.); Kane 41', 65'	Report		Attendance: 3,751; Referee: Mathieson

7 January 2012	Middlesbrough (2)	1−0	Shrewsbury Town (4)	Riverside Stadium, Middlesbrough
15:00	Emnes 40'	Report		Attendance: 12,631; Referee: Bates

7 January 2012	Nottingham Forest (2)	0−0	Leicester City (2)	City Ground, Nottingham
15:00		Report		Attendance: 18,477; Referee: Eltringham

17 January 2012 Replay	Leicester City (2)	4−0	Nottingham Forest (2)	King Power Stadium, Leicester
19:30	Boateng 7' (o.g.); Beckford 30', 50', 57'	Report		Attendance: 16,210; Referee: Pawson

7 January 2012	Crawley Town (4)	1−0	Bristol City (2)	Broadfield Stadium, Crawley
15:00	Tubbs 73'	Report		Attendance: 3,779; Referee: D'Urso

7 January 2012	Doncaster Rovers (2)	0−2	Notts County (3)	Keepmoat Stadium, Doncaster
15:00		Report	J. Hughes 37', 70' (pen.)	Attendance: 9,535; Referee: Phil Gibbs

7 January 2012	Tottenham Hotspur (1)	3−0	Cheltenham Town (4)	White Hart Lane, London
15:00	Defoe 24'; Pavlyuchenko 43'; Dos Santos 87'	Report		Attendance: 35,672; Referee: Mason

7 January 2012	Milton Keynes Dons (3)	1−1	Queens Park Rangers (1)	Stadium mk, Milton Keynes
15:00	Bowditch 65'	Report	Helguson 89'	Attendance: 19,506; Referee: Oliver

17 January 2012 Replay	Queens Park Rangers (1)	1−0	Milton Keynes Dons (3)	Loftus Road, London
20:00	Gabbidon 73'	Report		Attendance: 10,885; Referee: Dowd

7 January 2012	Hull City (2)	3−1	Ipswich Town (2)	KC Stadium, Kingston upon Hull
15:00	McLean 27'; Cairney 32'; Stewart 90+4'	Report	Scotland 57'	Attendance: 10,246; Referee: Pawson

7 January 2012	Coventry City (2)	1−2	Southampton (2)	Ricoh Arena, Coventry
15:00	McSheffrey 5'	Report	Ward-Prowse 64'; Martin 82'	Attendance: 9,000; Referee: Webster

7 January 2012	Brighton & Hove Albion (2)	1−1	Wrexham (5)	Falmer Stadium, Falmer
15:00	Forster-Caskey 48'	Report	Cieslewicz 62'	Attendance: 18,573; Referee: Deadman

18 January 2012 Replay	Wrexham (5)	1−1 (a.e.t.) (4−5 p)	Brighton & Hove Albion (2)	Racecourse Ground, Wrexham
19:15	Morrell 23'	Report	Barnes 77'	Attendance: 8,316; Referee: Webster
	Penalties
	Keates (penalty missed); Clarke (penalty scored); Hunt (penalty scored); Ashton (penalty scored); Little (penalty scored)		(penalty scored) Barnes; (penalty scored) Sparrow; (penalty scored) Bridcutt; (penalty scored) Calderón; (penalty scored) Mackail-Smith

7 January 2012	Fulham (1)	4−0	Charlton Athletic (3)	Craven Cottage, London
15:00	Dempsey 8', 61', 81' (pen.); Duff 87'	Report		Attendance: 20,317; Referee: Dowd

7 January 2012	Norwich City (1)	4−1	Burnley (2)	Carrow Road, Norwich
15:00	Holt 6'; Jackson 12'; Surman 60'; Morison 73'	Report	Rodriguez 15'	Attendance: 22,898; Referee: Jones

7 January 2012	Derby County (2)	1−0	Crystal Palace (2)	Pride Park Stadium, Derby
15:00	Robinson 9'	Report		Attendance: 10,113; Referee: Drysdale

7 January 2012	Fleetwood Town (5)	1−5	Blackpool (2)	Highbury Stadium, Fleetwood
15:00	Vardy 70'	Report	LuaLua 24'; M. Phillips 47', 77', 81'; Ince 55'	Attendance: 5,092; Referee: Whitestone

7 January 2012 FA Ronnie Radford Award	Swindon Town (4)	2−1	Wigan Athletic (1)	County Ground, Swindon
15:00	Connell 40'; Benson 76'	Report	McManaman 35'	Attendance: 10,488; Referee: Walton

7 January 2012	Barnsley (2)	2−4	Swansea City (1)	Oakwell, Barnsley
15:00	Vaz Tê 29', 65'	Report	Rangel 30'; Graham 46', 89'; Dyer 54'	Attendance: 7,380; Referee: Attwell

7 January 2012	Macclesfield Town (4)	2−2	Bolton Wanderers (1)	Moss Rose, Macclesfield
15:00	Daniel 16'; Mendy 68'	Report	Klasnić 7'; Wheater 77'	Attendance: 5,757; Referee: Moss

17 January 2012 Replay	Bolton Wanderers (1)	2−0	Macclesfield Town (4)	Reebok Stadium, Bolton
20:00	Davies 1'; Petrov 26'	Report		Attendance: 9,466; Referee: Oliver

7 January 2012	Newcastle United (1)	2−1	Blackburn Rovers (1)	St James' Park, Newcastle upon Tyne
15:00	Ben Arfa 70'; Gutiérrez 90+5'	Report	Goodwillie 35'	Attendance: 30,876; Referee: Friend

7 January 2012	Everton (1)	2−0	Tamworth (5)	Goodison Park, Liverpool
15:00	Heitinga 5'; Baines 79' (pen.)	Report		Attendance: 27,564; Referee: Bobby Madley

7 January 2012	Sheffield United (3)	3−1	Salisbury City (6)	Bramall Lane, Sheffield
15:00	Porter 18'; Evans 60'; Webb 72' (o.g.)	Report	Macklin 86'	Attendance: 10,488; Referee: David Webb

7 January 2012	Gillingham (4)	1−3	Stoke City (1)	MEMS Priestfield Stadium, Gillingham
15:00	Kedwell 16'	Report	Walters 34'; Jerome 43'; Huth 49'	Attendance: 9,872; Referee: Halsey

7 January 2012	Watford (2)	4−2	Bradford City (4)	Vicarage Road, Watford
15:00	Deeney 3'; Sordell 40'; Forsyth 56', 59'	Report	Hanson 8'; Wells 88'	Attendance: 8,935; Referee: Ward

7 January 2012	West Bromwich Albion (1)	4−2	Cardiff City (2)	The Hawthorns, West Bromwich
15:00	Odemwingie 7'; Cox 33', 61', 90'	Report	Earnshaw 36'; Mason 50'	Attendance: 12,454; Referee: Probert

7 January 2012	Reading (2)	0−1	Stevenage (3)	Madejski Stadium, Reading
15:00		Report	Charles 21'	Attendance: 11,295; Referee: Miller

7 January 2012	Bristol Rovers (4)	1−3	Aston Villa (1)	Memorial Stadium, Bristol
17:30	McGleish 90'	Report	Albrighton 35'; Agbonlahor 64'; Clark 78'	Attendance: 10,883; Referee: Howard Webb

8 January 2012	Manchester City (1)	2−3	Manchester United (1)	City of Manchester Stadium, Manchester
13:00	Kolarov 48'; Agüero 64'	Report	Rooney 10', 40'; Welbeck 30'	Attendance: 46,808; Referee: Foy

8 January 2012	Chelsea (1)	4−0	Portsmouth (2)	Stamford Bridge, London
15:00	Mata 48'; Ramires 85', 87'; Lampard 90+3'	Report		Attendance: 41,259; Referee: Taylor

8 January 2012	Sheffield Wednesday (3)	1−0	West Ham United (2)	Hillsborough Stadium, Sheffield
15:00	O'Grady 88'	Report		Attendance: 17,916; Referee: Stroud

8 January 2012	Peterborough United (2)	0−2	Sunderland (1)	London Road Stadium, Peterborough
15:30		Report	Larsson 48'; McClean 58'	Attendance: 8,954; Referee: Atkinson

9 January 2012	Arsenal (1)	1−0	Leeds United (2)	Emirates Stadium, London
19:45	Henry 78'	Report		Attendance: 59,615; Referee: Clattenburg

== Fourth round proper ==
The winners of the third round played in this round. The draw was made on 8 January 2012, with the ties scheduled to be played on the weekend of 28–29 January 2012. The lowest ranked clubs that participated in this round were Crawley Town and Swindon Town, from the fourth tier.

- Player of the Round: Will Buckley (Brighton & Hove Albion, 44% of the vote).
  The other nominees were: Jed Steer (Norwich City, 24%), Jermaine Beckford (Leicester City, 24%), Robin van Persie (Arsenal, 4%) and Matt Tubbs (Crawley Town, 3%).

27 January 2012	Watford (2)	0–1	Tottenham Hotspur (1)	Vicarage Road, Watford
19:45 GMT		Report	van der Vaart 42'	Attendance: 15,384; Referee: Chris Foy

27 January 2012	Everton (1)	2–1	Fulham (1)	Goodison Park, Liverpool
20:00 GMT	Stracqualursi 27'; Fellaini 73'	Report	Murphy 14' (pen.)	Attendance: 25,300; Referee: Howard Webb

28 January 2012	Queens Park Rangers (1)	0–1	Chelsea (1)	Loftus Road, London
12:00 GMT		Report	Mata 62' (pen.)	Attendance: 15,728; Referee: Mike Dean

28 January 2012	Liverpool (1)	2–1	Manchester United (1)	Anfield, Liverpool
12:45 GMT	Agger 21'; Kuyt 88'	Report	Park 39'	Attendance: 43,952; Referee: Mark Halsey

28 January 2012	Derby County (2)	0–2	Stoke City (1)	Pride Park Stadium, Derby
15:00 GMT		Report	Jerome 5'; Huth 81'	Attendance: 22,247; Referee: Mark Clattenburg

28 January 2012	Stevenage (3)	1–0	Notts County (3)	Broadhall Way, Stevenage
15:00 GMT	Stewart 12' (o.g.)	Report		Attendance: 4,439; Referee: Neil Swarbrick

28 January 2012	Blackpool (2)	1–1	Sheffield Wednesday (3)	Bloomfield Road, Blackpool
15:00 GMT	K. Phillips 90+3' (pen.)	Report	Morrison 51'	Attendance: 14,042; Referee: Darren Deadman

7 February 2012 Replay	Sheffield Wednesday (3)	0–3	Blackpool (2)	Hillsborough Stadium, Sheffield
19:45 GMT		Report	Phillips 7'; LuaLua 14'; Sylvestre 54'	Attendance: 10,274; Referee: Andy D'Urso

28 January 2012	West Bromwich Albion (1)	1–2	Norwich City (1)	The Hawthorns, West Bromwich
15:00 GMT	Fortuné 54'	Report	Holt 35'; Jackson 85'	Attendance: 17,434; Referee: Michael Oliver

28 January 2012	Hull City (2)	0–1	Crawley Town (4)	KC Stadium, Kingston upon Hull
15:00 GMT		Report	Tubbs 57'	Attendance: 14,473; Referee: Stuart Attwell

28 January 2012	Sheffield United (3)	0–4	Birmingham City (2)	Bramall Lane, Sheffield
15:00 GMT		Report	Redmond 18'; Rooney 38', 78'; Elliott 58'	Attendance: 18,072; Referee: Lee Mason

28 January 2012	Leicester City (2)	2–0	Swindon Town (4)	King Power Stadium, Leicester
15:00 GMT	Beckford 5', 53'	Report		Attendance: 19,942; Referee: Darren Drysdale

28 January 2012	Millwall (2)	1–1	Southampton (2)	The Den, London
15:00 GMT	Henderson 86'	Report	Lambert 31'	Attendance: 8,278; Referee: Roger East

7 February 2012 Replay	Southampton (2)	2–3	Millwall (2)	St Mary's Stadium, Southampton
19:45 GMT	Lallana 35'; Lambert 77'	Report	Trotter 17'; N'Guessan 79'; Feeney 90+2'	Attendance: 8,493; Referee: Dean Whitestone

28 January 2012	Bolton Wanderers (1)	2–1	Swansea City (1)	Reebok Stadium, Bolton
15:00 GMT	Pratley 45+2'; Eagles 56'	Report	Moore 43'	Attendance: 11,597; Referee: Anthony Taylor

28 January 2012	Brighton & Hove Albion (2)	1–0	Newcastle United (1)	Falmer Stadium, Falmer
17:15 GMT	Williamson 76' (o.g.)	Report		Attendance: 21,558; Referee: Lee Probert

29 January 2012	Sunderland (1)	1–1	Middlesbrough (2)	Stadium of Light, Sunderland
13:30 GMT	Campbell 59'	Report	Robson 16'	Attendance: 33,275; Referee: Kevin Friend

8 February 2012 Replay	Middlesbrough (2)	1–2 (a.e.t.)	Sunderland (1)	Riverside Stadium, Middlesbrough
19:45 GMT	Jutkiewicz 57'	Report	Colback 42'; Sessègnon 113'	Attendance: 26,707; Referee: Anthony Taylor

29 January 2012	Arsenal (1)	3–2	Aston Villa (1)	Emirates Stadium, London
16:00 GMT	Van Persie 54' (pen.), 61' (pen.); Walcott 57'	Report	Dunne 33'; Bent 45+1'	Attendance: 60,019; Referee: Mike Jones

== Fifth round proper ==
The winners of the fourth-round matches progressed to this round. The draw was made live on ITV1 and ESPN on 29 January 2012, with the ties scheduled to be played on the weekend of 18–19 February 2012. Crawley Town were the lowest-ranked team in the fifth round for the second season running and the only club remaining from the fourth tier of the English league system.

- Player of the Round: Kieran Richardson (Sunderland, 60% of the vote).
  The other nominees were: Colin Doyle (Birmingham City, 19%), Mark Roberts (Stevenage, 10%), Curtis Davies (Birmingham City, 9%) and David Nugent (Leicester City, 1%).

18 February 2012	Chelsea (1)	1–1	Birmingham City (2)	Stamford Bridge, London
12:30 GMT	Sturridge 62'	Report	Murphy 20'	Attendance: 36,870; Referee: Martin Atkinson

6 March 2012 Replay	Birmingham City (2)	0–2	Chelsea (1)	St Andrew's, Birmingham
19:45 GMT		Report	Mata 54'; Meireles 60'	Attendance: 21,822; Referee: Anthony Taylor

18 February 2012	Everton (1)	2–0	Blackpool (2)	Goodison Park, Liverpool
15:00 GMT	Drenthe 1'; Stracqualursi 6'	Report		Attendance: 38,347; Referee: Michael Oliver

18 February 2012	Norwich City (1)	1–2	Leicester City (2)	Carrow Road, Norwich
15:00 GMT	Hoolahan 23'	Report	St Ledger 5'; Nugent 71'	Attendance: 26,658; Referee: Mike Dean

18 February 2012	Millwall (2)	0–2	Bolton Wanderers (1)	The Den, London
15:00 GMT		Report	Miyaichi 4'; Ngog 59'	Attendance: 11,320; Referee: Kevin Friend

18 February 2012	Sunderland (1)	2–0	Arsenal (1)	Stadium of Light, Sunderland
17:15 GMT	Richardson 40'; Oxlade-Chamberlain 78' (o.g.)	Report		Attendance: 26,042; Referee: Howard Webb

19 February 2012	Crawley Town (4)	0–2	Stoke City (1)	Broadfield Stadium, Crawley
12:00 GMT		Report	Walters 42' (pen.); Crouch 52'	Attendance: 4,214; Referee: Mike Jones

19 February 2012	Stevenage (3)	0–0	Tottenham Hotspur (1)	Broadhall Way, Stevenage
14:00 GMT		Report		Attendance: 6,625; Referee: Phil Dowd

7 March 2012 Replay	Tottenham Hotspur (1)	3–1	Stevenage (3)	White Hart Lane, London
19:30 GMT	Defoe 26', 75'; Adebayor 55' (pen.)	Report	Byrom 4' (pen.)	Attendance: 35,757; Referee: Michael Oliver

19 February 2012	Liverpool (1)	6–1	Brighton & Hove Albion (2)	Anfield, Liverpool
16:30 GMT	Škrtel 5'; Bridcutt 44' (o.g.); Carroll 57'; Gerrard 71'; Dunk 74' (o.g.); Suárez 85'	Report	LuaLua 17'	Attendance: 43,940; Referee: Andre Marriner

== Sixth round proper ==
The draw for the sixth round took place on 19 February 2012 following the match between Stevenage and Tottenham Hotspur. Ties were played on the weekend of 17–18 March. Leicester City were the lowest-ranked team in the sixth round, and were the only club remaining from the second tier of the English league system.

- Player of the Round: Nikica Jelavić (Everton, 63% of the votes).
  The other nominees were: Tim Cahill (Everton 15%), Stewart Downing (Liverpool, 12%), Fernando Torres (Chelsea, 6%) and Ádám Bogdán (Bolton Wanderers, 5%)

17 March 2012	Everton (1)	1–1	Sunderland (1)	Goodison Park, Liverpool
12:45 GMT	Cahill 24'	Report	Bardsley 12'	Attendance: 38,875; Referee: Andre Marriner

27 March 2012 Replay	Sunderland (1)	0–2	Everton (1)	Stadium of Light, Sunderland
20:00 BST		Report	Jelavić 24'; Vaughan 57' (o.g.)	Attendance: 43,140; Referee: Lee Probert

17 March 2012	Tottenham Hotspur (1)	1–1 (Abandoned) (Note: The match was abandoned after 41 minutes after Bolton's Fabrice Muamba suffered cardiac arrest on the pitch. He ultimately recovered after a month of recuperation at London Chest Hospital.)	Bolton Wanderers (1)	White Hart Lane, London
17:30 GMT	Walker 12'	Report	Bale 6' (o.g.)	Attendance: 29,130; Referee: Howard Webb

27 March 2012 Rematch	Tottenham Hotspur (1)	3–1	Bolton Wanderers (1)	White Hart Lane, London
19:45 BST	Nelsen 74'; Bale 77'; Saha 90+4'	Report	Davies 90'	Attendance: 30,718; Referee: Howard Webb

18 March 2012	Chelsea (1)	5–2	Leicester City (2)	Stamford Bridge, London
14:05 GMT	Cahill 12'; Kalou 17'; Torres 67', 85'; Meireles 90'	Report	Beckford 77'; Marshall 88'	Attendance: 38,276; Referee: Lee Probert

18 March 2012	Liverpool (1)	2–1	Stoke City (1)	Anfield, Liverpool
16:00 GMT	Suárez 23'; Downing 57'	Report	Crouch 26'	Attendance: 43,962; Referee: Kevin Friend

== Semi-finals ==
Ties were played on the weekend of 14–15 April. All four semi-final teams were from the Premier League, and both semi-finals were local derbies, with a London derby between Tottenham Hotspur and Chelsea, and a Merseyside derby between Liverpool and Everton both played at Wembley Stadium.

- Player of the Round: Didier Drogba (Chelsea, 39% of the votes).
  The other nominees were: Luis Suárez, Liverpool, 33%), Frank Lampard (Chelsea, 16%), Ramires (Chelsea, 6%) and Brad Jones (Liverpool, 6%).

14 April 2012	Liverpool (1)	2–1	Everton (1)	Wembley Stadium, London
12:30 BST	Suárez 62'; Carroll 87'	Report	Jelavić 24'	Attendance: 87,231; Referee: Howard Webb

15 April 2012	Tottenham Hotspur (1)	1–5	Chelsea (1)	Wembley Stadium, London
18:00 BST	Bale 56'	Report	Drogba 43'; Mata 49'; Ramires 77'; Lampard 80'; Malouda 90+4'	Attendance: 85,731; Referee: Martin Atkinson

== Final ==
5 May 2012
17:15 BST

Chelsea	2–1	Liverpool
Ramires 11'; Drogba 52'	Report	Carroll 64'

Wembley Stadium, London
Attendance: 89,102
Referee: Phil Dowd (Staffordshire)

== Top scorers ==
Correct as of 5 May 2012.

Position	Player	Club	Goals
1	(Jamaica) Jermaine Beckford	Leicester City	6
2	(Wales) Ched Evans	Sheffield United	5
2	(England) Matt Tubbs	Crawley Town	5
4	(Spain) Juan Mata	Chelsea	4
4	(England) Adam Boyes	Barrow	4
4	(England) Darius Henderson	Millwall	4
4	(Northern Ireland) Jeff Hughes	Notts County	4
4	(Scotland) Matt Phillips	Blackpool	4
4	(Brazil) Ramires	Chelsea	4
4	(England) Andy Carroll	Liverpool	4
11	(Uruguay) Luis Suárez	Liverpool	3
11	(England) Jermain Defoe	Tottenham Hotspur	3
11	(United States) Clint Dempsey	Fulham	3
11	(England) Lewis Grabban	Rotherham United	3
11	(England) Dean Bowditch	Milton Keynes Dons	3
11	(Barbados) Jon Nurse	Dagenham & Redbridge	3
11	(England) Jamie Vardy	Fleetwood Town	3
11	(England) Andy Morrell	Wrexham	3
11	(England) Stefan Brown	AFC Totton	3

== Media coverage ==
From the first round proper onwards, selected matches from the FA Cup are broadcast live both in the UK and Ireland by ESPN and ITV, while S4C broadcast in Wales. ESPN broadcast 25 live games including the final while ITV broadcast 17 live games also including the final and the draws for the next round. S4C, in Welsh.

These matches were broadcast live on television in the UK.

Round	ESPN	ITV (ITV1 unless otherwise stated)	S4C
First round proper	Newport County v Shrewsbury Town; Morecambe v Sheffield Wednesday; Stourbridge v Plymouth Argyle (replay); Bath City v Dagenham & Redbridge (replay)	FC Halifax Town v Charlton Athletic	Wrexham v Cambridge United
Second round proper	Fleetwood Town v Yeovil Town; Sutton United v Notts County; Yeovil Town v Fleetwood Town (replay); Macclesfield Town v Chelmsford City (replay)	AFC Totton v Bristol Rovers	
Third round proper	Birmingham City v Wolverhampton Wanderers; Bristol Rovers v Aston Villa; Arsenal v Leeds United; Leicester City v Nottingham Forest (replay); Wrexham v Brighton & Hove Albion (replay)	Manchester City v Manchester United; Peterborough United v Sunderland; Wolverhampton Wanderers v Birmingham City (replay); Queens Park Rangers v Milton Keynes Dons (ITV4) (replay)	Wrexham v Brighton & Hove Albion (replay)
Fourth round proper	Watford v Tottenham Hotspur; Brighton & Hove Albion v Newcastle United; Arsenal v Aston Villa; Sheffield Wednesday v Blackpool (replay)	Liverpool v Manchester United; Sunderland v Middlesbrough; Middlesbrough v Sunderland (replay)	

Round	Date	Teams	Kick-off	Channels	
Round	Date	Teams	Kick-off	Digital	TV
Fifth Round	18 February	Chelsea v Birmingham City	12:30	—N/a	ESPN
Fifth Round	18 February	Sunderland v Arsenal	17:15	ITV Hub	ITV1
Fifth Round	19 February	Crawley Town v Stoke City	12:00	—N/a	ESPN
Fifth Round	19 February	Stevenage v Tottenham Hotspur	14:00	ITV Hub	ITV1
Fifth Round	19 February	Liverpool v Brighton & Hove Albion	16:30	—N/a	ESPN
Fifth Round (Replay)	6 March	Birmingham City v Chelsea	19:45	ITV Hub	ITV1
Fifth Round (Replay)	7 March	Tottenham Hotspur v Stevenage	19:30	—N/a	ESPN
Sixth Round	17 March	Everton v Sunderland	12:45	—N/a	ESPN
Sixth Round	17 March	~~Tottenham Hotspur v Bolton Wanderers~~ (Note: Tottenham Hotspur v Bolton Wanderers match was abandoned after 41 minutes after Bolton's Fabrice Muamba suffered cardiac arrest on the pitch. The game was done as a rematch with it reschedulded on March 27th.)	~~17:30~~	—N/a	~~ESPN~~
Sixth Round	18 March	Chelsea V Leicester City	14:05	ITV Hub	ITV1
Sixth Round	18 March	Liverpool v Stoke City	16:00	—N/a	ESPN
Sixth Round	27 March	Tottenham Hotspur v Bolton Wanderers	19:45	—N/a	ESPN
Sixth Round (Replay)	27 March	Sunderland v Everton	20:00	—N/a	ESPN
Semi-Finals	14 April	Liverpool v Everton	12:30	—N/a	ESPN
Semi-Finals	15 April	Tottenham Hotspur v Chelsea	18:00	ITV Hub	ITV1
Final	5 May	Liverpool v Chelsea	17:15	ITV Hub	ITV1
Final	5 May	Liverpool v Chelsea	17:15	—N/a	ESPN

Welsh language channel S4C broadcast live coverage of selected matches involving a Welsh club, which were two Wrexham matches. Their first round proper match at Cambridge United and their third round proper replay at home to Brighton & Hove Albion. Those were the only FA Cup matches that S4C broadcast.

International broadcasters

Country	Broadcaster
Albania	Tring Sport
Belgium	Prime
Canada	Sportsnet World
France	France Télévisions
Italy	SKY Italia
Netherlands	Eredivisie Live
Russia	Russia 2 & Sport-1
