= Kelmscott (disambiguation) =

Kelmscott is a village and civil parish in West Oxfordshire, England.

Kelmscott may refer to:

- Kelmscott, Western Australia
  - Kelmscott railway station
- Kelmscott House, Hammersmith, England
- Kelmscott Manor, Kelmscott, England
- Kelmscott Press, Hammersmith, England
- Kelmscott School, Walthamstow, East London, England
