= Partnerships for Schools =

Partnerships for Schools (PfS) was established in 2004 as a Non-Departmental Public Body (NDPB), wholly owned and funded by the Department for Education (DfE), to deliver the UK's Building Schools for the Future (BSF) programme. In March 2006, PfS also took on responsibility for delivering the Academies programme, integrating delivery into BSF where possible.

PfS was a partnership between the Department for Education (DfE), (formerly DCSF and previous to that DfES), Partnerships UK and private sector companies.

Every state secondary school in England – around 3,500 in total – was to be rebuilt or refurbished by PfS over the duration of the programme, affecting around 3.3 million young people and thousands of teachers.

As of September 2008, 22 local authorities had selected their private sector partner for BSF and in so doing signed contracts worth £2.5bn that would see nearly 150 schools rebuilt or refurbished.

On 16 June 2009 the new Schools Minister, Vernon Coaker, announced that from 1 October 2009 PfS would also take on the responsibility for the distribution of capital for the Primary Capital Programme, Devolved Formula Capital and the Targeted Capital programme on behalf of the DCSF. Prior to this PfS had been charged with administering the cross government Co-location Fund.

PfS was reported as being criticised by the National Audit Office for being over optimistic in its targets, for using consultants uneconomically, and for having high staff costs (the Chief Executive and top four directors received about £750,000 pa in total); the Shadow Schools Secretary warned that it should 'slim down' its bureaucracy. It was also reported to have unsuccessfully attempted to censor unfavourable comments from a critical report by the Policy Exchange think tank.

It was announced in June 2011 that PfS would be axed on 31 March 2012 to be replaced with a new executive agency called the Education Funding Agency.
