= Judgemeadow Community College =

Location
- Marydene Drive; Evington; Leicester, Leicestershire, LE5 6HP; England; 52.6217°N 1.0648°W

Information
- Type: Academy
- Motto: "At Judgemeadow we believe in: being kind and helping each other, respecting each other, being organised and disciplined, and working hard"
- Established: 1973
- Sister school: Sir Jonathan North Girls' College
- Local authority: Leicester
- Trust: Lionheart Educational Trust
- Department for Education URN: 145558 Tables
- Ofsted: Reports
- Principal: Alex Grainge
- Gender: Mixed
- Age: 11 to 16
- Enrolment: c. 1,400
- Colours: Gray, White, Red
- Publication: judgemeadow.org.uk
- Website: www.judgemeadow.org.uk

Judgemeadow Community College is a mixed secondary school located in the Evington area of Leicester in the English county of Leicestershire.

== History ==
The school was established in 1973, and moved into a new building on the same site in June 2009 as part of the Building Schools for the Future programme. Previously a community school administered by Leicester City Council.

In 2016, Judgemeadow received their first ‘inadequate’ rating from Ofsted.

In June 2018, Judgemeadow Community College converted to academy status and is now sponsored by the Lionheart Educational Trust and made significant changes to the school.

In 2022, Judgemeadow’s Ofsted rating went from ‘Inadequate’ to ‘Good’

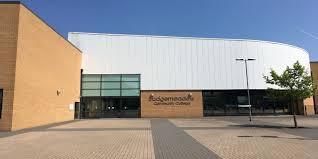
Entrance to the new school building. (Photo by: https://judgemeadow.org.uk)

== Academics ==
Judgemeadow Community College offers GCSEs, BTECs ASDAN and Cambridge Nationals as programmes of study for pupils.

== Student-led podcast ==
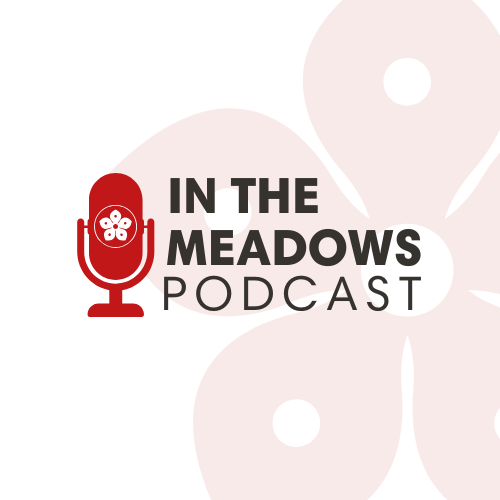
In the Meadows Podcast Logo, designed by school student

In 2022, Judgemeadow Community College launched a student-led podcast titled In the Meadows. Planned, recorded, and edited entirely by students, the podcast gives pupils a platform to discuss topics of interest, interview guests, and explore issues related to education, wellbeing, and the wider community. Notable episodes have included interviews with Andrea Ash, CEO of Leicester Tigers; Fatimah Bobra, a finalist in Miss Teen Great Britain; and the High Sheriff of Leicestershire.

The podcast is recorded on-site at the school and is published through the college’s official YouTube channel as well as the school website. It is part of the school's broader effort to integrate media, oracy, and leadership skills into student development.

In the Meadowshas received national recognition and was featured in Education Today magazine, where it was praised for “bringing learning to life with a burst of energy and excitement.”

== Notable former pupils ==
- Bali Rai, novelist
- Andy May, Sports Presenter
