= Fabrice Muamba =

English-Congolese professional footballer (born 1988)

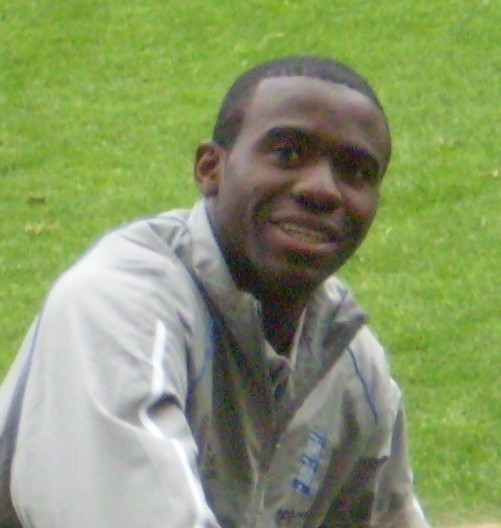
- Muamba with Birmingham City in 2007

Personal information
- Full name: Fabrice Ndala Muamba
- Date of birth: 6 April 1988 (age 38)
- Place of birth: Kinshasa, Zaire (now DR Congo)
- Height: 6 ft 2 in (1.88 m)
- Position: Central midfielder

Team information
- Current team: Burnley (Academy coach)

Youth career
- 2002–2005: Arsenal

Senior career*
Years	Team	Apps	(Gls)
2005–2007	Arsenal	0	(0)
2006–2007	→ Birmingham City (loan)	34	(0)
2007–2008	Birmingham City	37	(2)
2008–2012	Bolton Wanderers	130	(3)
Total		201	(5)

International career
2002–2003	England U16	7	(0)
2004–2005	England U17	7	(0)
2005–2006	England U18	2	(0)
2006–2007	England U19	8	(0)
2007–2011	England U21	33	(0)
Medal record
Men's football
Representing England
UEFA European Under-21 Championship
Runner-up	2009 Sweden
- * Club domestic league appearances and goals

Fabrice Ndala Muamba (born 6 April 1988) is a Congolese-born English former professional footballer who played for Arsenal, Birmingham City and Bolton Wanderers as a central midfielder. Born in Zaire, Muamba moved to England at the age of 11 and subsequently played for up to England under-21 level.

Muamba began his career in 2002, joining Arsenal's youth academy. After three years, he turned professional in 2005. He made his debut for Arsenal in the League Cup, but played only one other professional match for the club. Following a loan spell with Birmingham City, he made the move permanent in 2007. He stayed with Birmingham City for one additional year, and left after making more than 70 appearances and making his England under-21 debut while with the team. He joined Bolton Wanderers in 2008.

In March 2012, Muamba suffered a cardiac arrest during a televised FA Cup match between Bolton and Tottenham Hotspur, from which he recovered despite his heart having stopped for 78 minutes. Following medical advice, he announced his retirement from professional football in August 2012. He later completed a degree in sports journalism before making a return to football as a youth coach.

== Early life ==
Muamba was born in Kinshasa, Zaire (now the Democratic Republic of the Congo). His father fled the country in 1994 because of his political views and arrived in the United Kingdom seeking asylum. In 1999, he was granted indefinite leave to remain, at which time he was joined by the rest of the family. They settled in east London, where Muamba attended Kelmscott School in Walthamstow. Despite having arrived in Britain aged 11, unable to speak English, he went on to achieve 10 GCSEs and A-levels in English, French and mathematics.

== Club career ==
=== Arsenal ===
Muamba was associated with Arsenal's youth system as a schoolboy from 2002, joining their Academy as a first-year scholar in August 2004. He signed his first professional contract in October 2005 and made his first team debut on 25 October in a League Cup tie against Sunderland, in front of a 47,000 crowd at the Stadium of Light. He made his second and final first team appearance for Arsenal in the next round, against Reading, where he contributed to a 3–0 victory.

=== Birmingham City ===
In August 2006, Muamba joined Championship club Birmingham City on a season-long loan. After a slow start, his energetic style of play, which has been likened to that of his hero Patrick Vieira, established him as a regular starter in central midfield. The fans were equally impressed, voting him their Young Player of the Season.

On 11 May 2007 Muamba made his move to Birmingham City permanent, signing a three-year contract for a fee reported by the club of £4 million. He scored his first goal for the club, a close-range volley from a corner, on 12 March 2008 in a 4–2 defeat at Portsmouth. He made 37 appearances as Birmingham were relegated from the Premier League after one season back in the top tier.

=== Bolton Wanderers ===
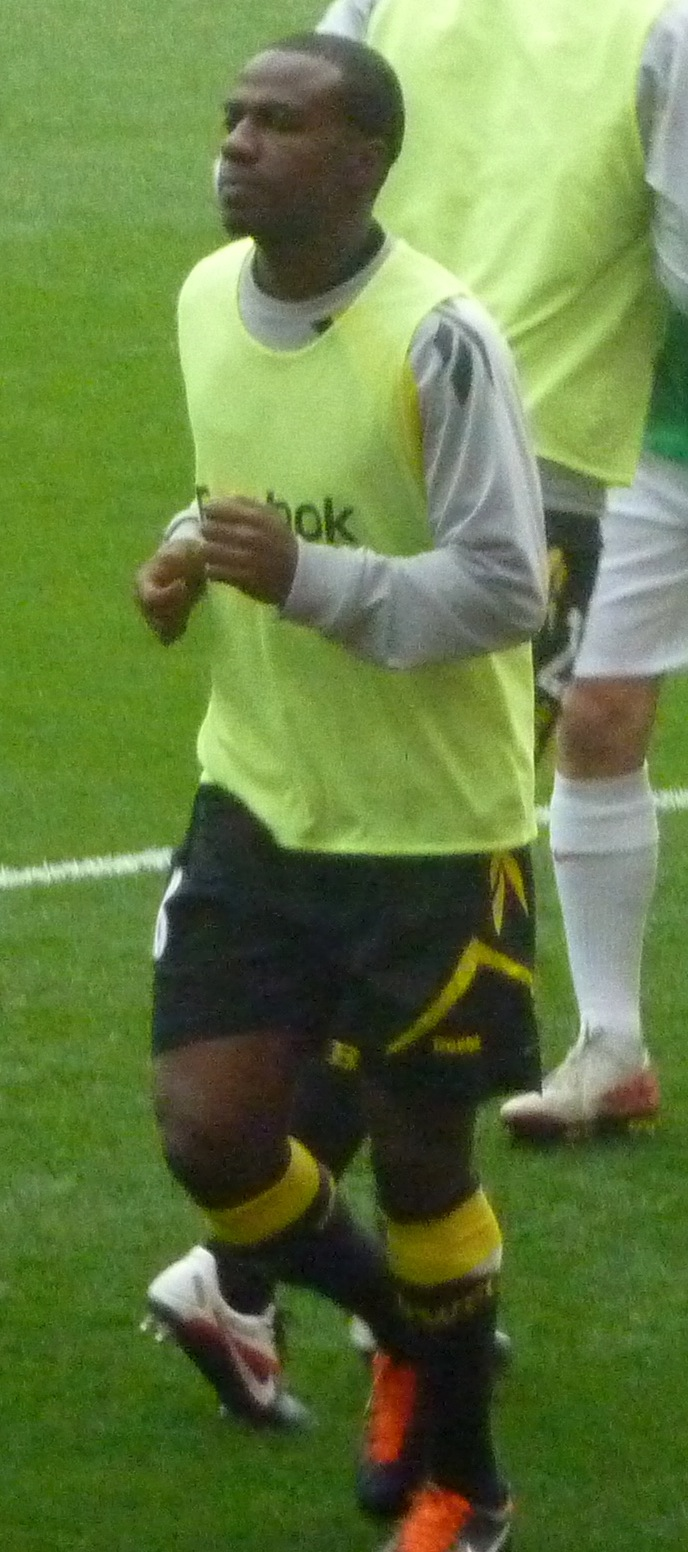
Muamba warming up before a Bolton Wanderers game in 2011

On 16 June 2008, Muamba joined Premier League Bolton Wanderers for a fee of £5 million, with add-ons worth a further £750,000, on a four-year contract. He scored his first goal for the club against Wigan Athletic on 13 March 2010. In recognition of his impressive 2009–10 season at Bolton, he was named as The Bolton News Player of the Season. On 7 August, Muamba signed a new four-year contract with Bolton.

Muamba scored on the opening day of the 2011–12 league season, in Bolton's 4–0 away win against Queens Park Rangers. He then scored his first ever goal in the League Cup, against his old club Arsenal in a 2–1 defeat.

=== Cardiac arrest and retirement ===
On 17 March 2012, Muamba suffered a cardiac arrest and collapsed during the first half of an FA Cup quarter-final match between Bolton and Tottenham Hotspur at White Hart Lane. After receiving lengthy attention on the pitch from medical personnel – including a consultant cardiologist, Dr. Andrew Deaner who was at the game as a fan – Muamba was taken to the specialist coronary care unit at the London Chest Hospital. Bolton manager Owen Coyle and club captain Kevin Davies accompanied Muamba in the ambulance. The match was abandoned by referee Howard Webb, and Bolton's next game, against Aston Villa, due to be played three days later, was postponed at the club's request. Aston Villa raised no objection.

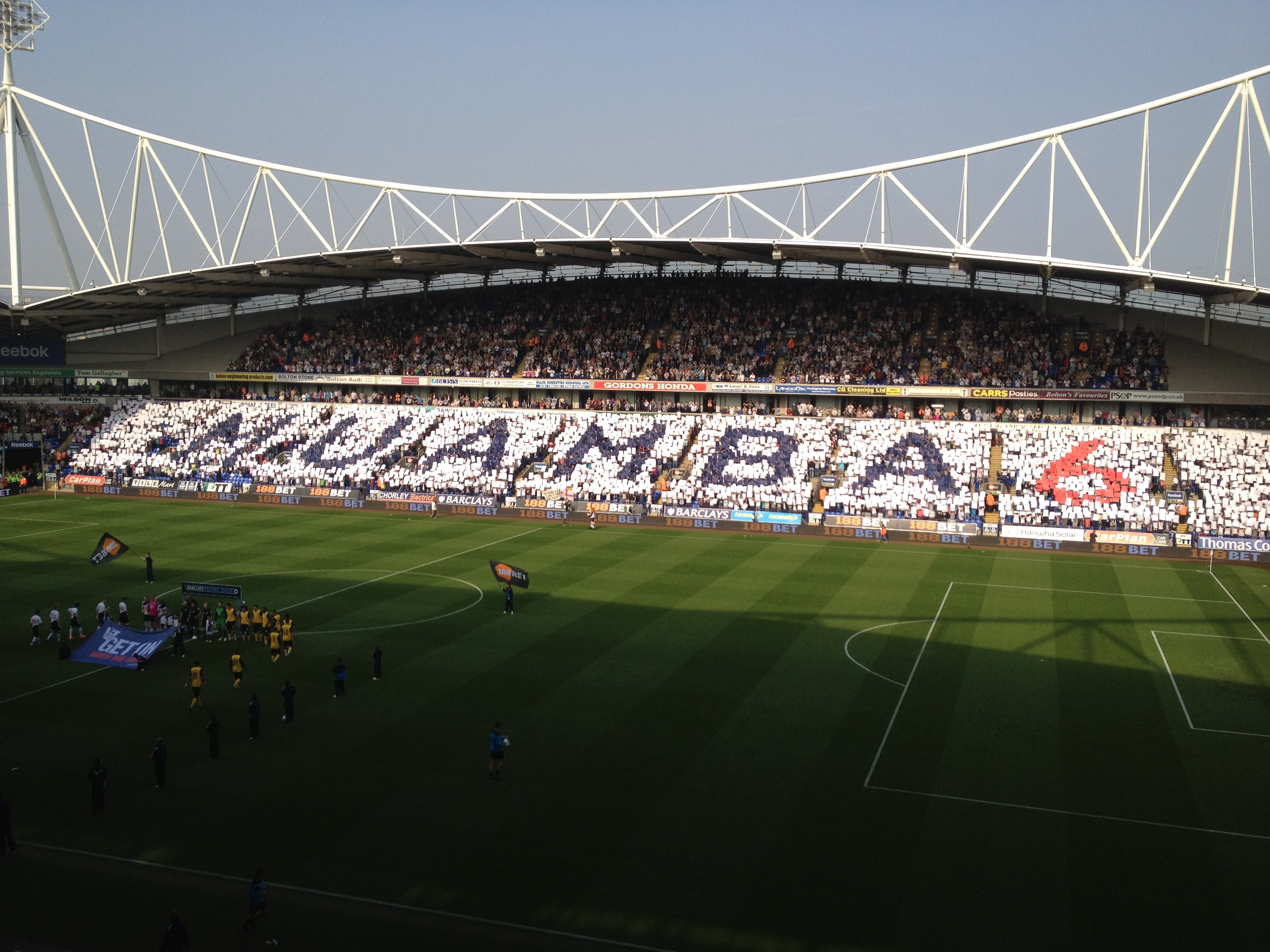
Bolton fans show their support for Muamba at their first match after the incident, against Blackburn Rovers on 24 March 2012.

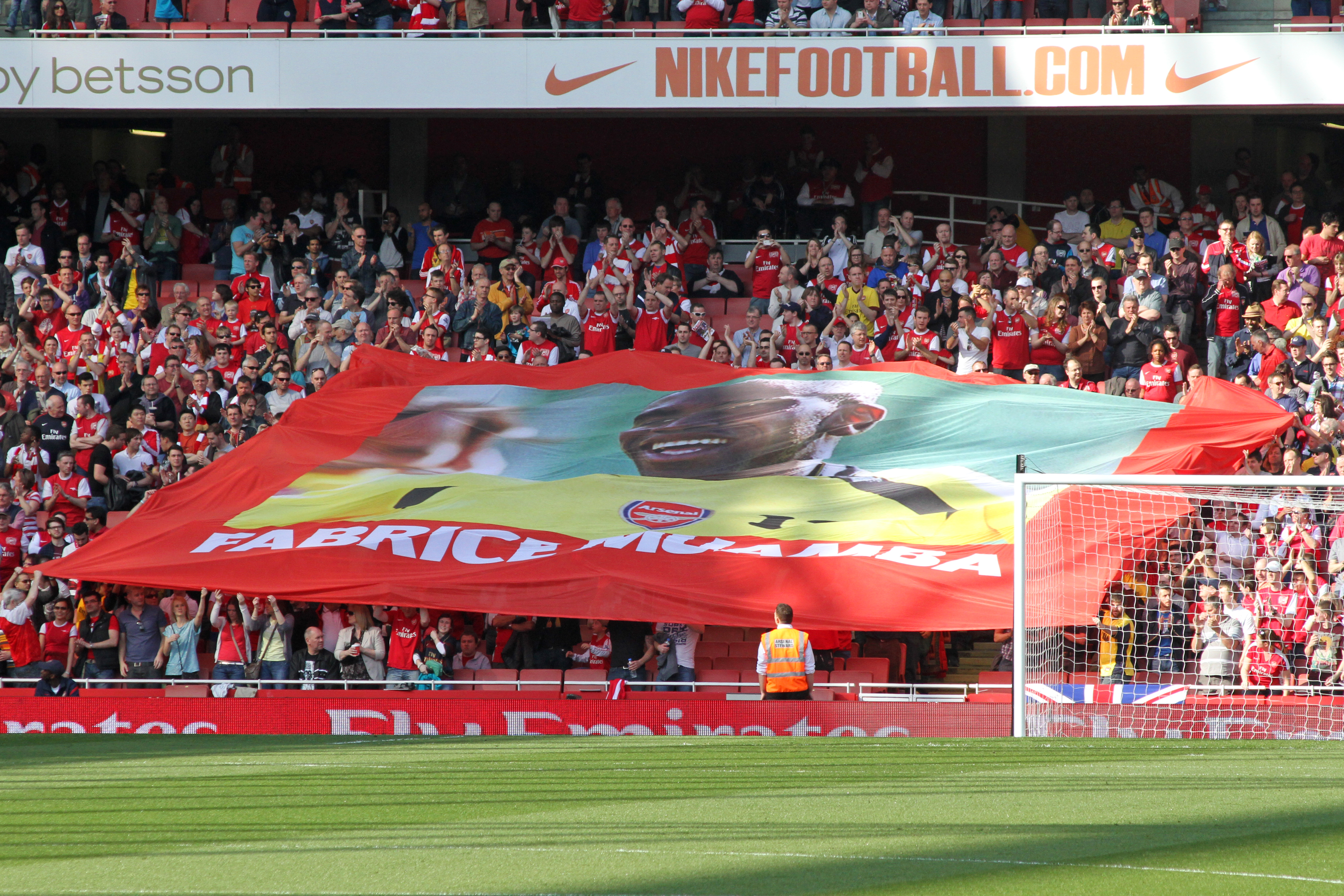
Arsenal fans showing their support for Muamba shortly after his cardiac arrest.

Bolton's club doctor later confirmed that Muamba had received numerous defibrillator shocks both on the pitch and in the ambulance, but his heart had stopped for 78 minutes. The player was initially kept under anaesthesia in intensive care. By 19 March, his heart was beating without medication and he was able to move his limbs. Later that day his condition was described as "serious" rather than "critical" and he was able to recognise family members and respond appropriately to questions. By 21 March, his consultant suggested that Muamba's progress had "exceeded our expectations" and that although he faced a "lengthy recovery period", "normal life is within the spectrum of possibility".

Two weeks after the incident, a photograph was released of Muamba sitting up in his hospital bed and smiling. He was discharged from hospital on 16 April, having been fitted with an implantable cardioverter-defibrillator (ICD). Muamba attended Bolton's home match against Tottenham Hotspur on 2 May, where he expressed his gratitude for the support he had received.

On 15 August 2012, Bolton announced that Muamba had retired from professional football, based on the recommendation of his medical team. Muamba said:

Since suffering my heart attack and being discharged from hospital, I have remained utterly positive in the belief I could one day resume my playing career and play for Bolton Wanderers once again. As part of my on-going recovery, last week I travelled to Belgium to seek further medical advice from a leading cardiologist. But the news I received was obviously not what I had hoped it would be and it means I am now announcing my retirement from professional football. Football has been my life since I was a teenage boy and it has given me so many opportunities. Above all else, I love the game and count myself very lucky to have been able to play at the highest level. While the news is devastating, I have much to be thankful for. I thank God that I am alive and I pay tribute once again to the members of the medical team who never gave up on me. I would also like to thank everyone who has supported me throughout my career, and the Bolton fans who have been incredible. I am blessed to have the support of my family and friends at this time.

On 8 November 2012, Muamba returned to White Hart Lane for the first time since his cardiac arrest and received a standing ovation from the crowd. Muamba later played 15 minutes in Ian Goodison's testimonial match in 2015.

== Post-playing career ==
=== Media work ===
Following his retirement from the game, Muamba was part of ITV's coverage of the 2013 Africa Cup of Nations. He was also a co-commentator alongside Derek Rae on BT Sport's coverage of the African World Cup qualification third round play-offs.

=== Journalism ===
Muamba studied for a BA in sports journalism at Staffordshire University; as part of his course he went on work placement at BBC North West Tonight. In July 2015, he graduated with honours.

=== Coaching ===
In March 2015, Muamba took some coaching sessions at Liverpool's academy. He later did his UEFA B Licence at Manchester City and A Licence at Stoke City.

In September 2018, he coached Rochdale's under-16 side while studying for his coaching badges, and in 2022, he returned to Bolton Wanderers to work in their academy where he was appointed as under-15s coach.

In March 2024, he announced that he had taken up a role coaching with the Burnley academy, whilst also working as a Player Services Executive for the PFA.

== International career ==
As a naturalised British citizen, Muamba was eligible to play for any of the Home Nations in which he had received three years of full-time education before the age of 18 or lived in for five years. In Muamba's case, that was just England, whom he represented at all youth levels, and captained the U-19 team. He received his first call-up for England U21 for the friendly against Romania U-21 on 21 August 2007 at Ashton Gate, Bristol, and made his debut as a second-half substitute.

Muamba had also been called up to the DR Congo squad in May 2007, but declined so as to remain eligible for England.

== Autobiography ==
Muamba wrote the autobiography, I'm Still Standing (ISBN 978-1908695406), in five weeks with Chris Brereton. The book details Muamba's collapse in March 2012 in an FA Cup quarter final between Bolton Wanderers and Tottenham Hotspur. It also details his early life in the Congo. It was released on 4 November 2012 by Trinity Mirror Sport Media.

== Personal life ==
Muamba met Shauna Magunda while he was a Birmingham City player and she was studying for a master's degree at Birmingham City University. They became engaged on 14 February 2012, married at Peckforton Castle, Cheshire, on 21 October 2012, and, as of June 2021, have three sons and a daughter. Muamba has been described as "deeply religious", and stated he would have sought a career in accountancy had he not become a professional footballer.

In July 2012, the University of Bolton awarded an honorary doctorate to Muamba, which he accepted on behalf of those involved in saving his life. He took part in the 2012 Christmas Special edition of the BBC programme Strictly Come Dancing.

== Career statistics ==
Appearances and goals by club, season and competition
Club	Season	League			FA Cup		League Cup		Other		Total	
Club	Season	Division	Apps	Goals	Apps	Goals	Apps	Goals	Apps	Goals	Apps	Goals
Arsenal	2005–06	Premier League	0	0	0	0	2	0	0	0	2	0
Birmingham City (loan)	2006–07	Championship	34	0	3	0	4	0	—		41	0
Birmingham City	2007–08	Premier League	37	2	1	0	0	0	—		38	2
Birmingham City	Total		71	2	4	0	4	0	—		79	2
Bolton Wanderers	2008–09	Premier League	38	0	1	0	1	0	—		40	0
Bolton Wanderers	2009–10	Premier League	36	1	4	0	3	0	—		43	1
Bolton Wanderers	2010–11	Premier League	36	1	5	0	0	0	—		41	1
Bolton Wanderers	2011–12	Premier League	20	1	2	0	2	1	—		24	2
Bolton Wanderers	Total		130	3	12	0	6	1	—		148	4
Career total			201	5	16	0	12	1	—		229	6

== Honours ==
England U21

- UEFA European Under-21 Championship runners-up: 2009
