= Lister Community School =

Location
- St Mary's Road; Plaistow, Greater London, E13 9AE; England

Information
- Type: Academy
- Trust: Newham Community Schools Trust
- Department for Education URN: 148902 Tables
- Ofsted: Reports
- Head teacher: Alice Clay
- Gender: Co-educational
- Age: 11 to 16
- Enrolment: 1513 (2024)
- Website: http://www.lister.newham.sch.uk/

Lister Community School is a co-educational secondary school located at St Mary's Road, Plaistow, Newham, London.

The school uses vertical tutoring to integrate the community of students across the range of ages and year groups. It is one of a few schools in Newham that provides specialist British sign language interpreters for students who have hearing impairments.

== History ==
The school was founded by West Ham Council in 1921 as Livingstone Day Continuation Institute, in Balaam Street Congregational schoolroom. It relocated a few times, was briefly absorbed into North West Ham Technical School after World War II, and was successively renamed as Lister Day-Continuation Institute (1933), Lister Technical School (1956), Lister Comprehensive (1972) and finally Lister Community School. Purpose-built facilities for the school were completed in the 1990s.

In 2003, pupils staged a walk-out in protest against the invasion of Iraq.

In 2005 Lister pupils won a poetry slam, and the school magazine Carbolic (named in honour of the school's namesake, local surgeon Joseph Lister) gained high praise from Benjamin Zephaniah and Michael Rosen.

In November 2008, an Ofsted inspection rated the school "Good with outstanding features". This was downgraded to "Satisfactory" following an inspection in 2012. but upgraded again to "Good" in the recent inspection in November 2013, with 64% of lessons inspected rated as "good" or "outstanding" and none "inadequate".

The school moved into brand new premises completed in 2010 at a cost of £25 million under the Building Schools for the Future (BSF) programme.

In 2017 the school started teaching GCSEs from Year 9 instead of Year 10 with the first class graduating in 2020.

Between 2018 and 2019 Lister Community School gained 7 more classrooms and a new "learning hub".

1. A new classroom was created on the second floor by moving the EAL office to the library
2. 4 new classrooms were created by an extension to W block which provided 4 new English classrooms
3. 3 new classrooms and a new careers office were created in a new "E"
4. A new classroom was built replacing a small office as "S001"
5. The classroom S008 was removed and expanded to hold a computer room managed by the library.
6. The Library was expanded.
7. The E block was converted into the JFK Special Needs School
8. A new 2 floor extension to the S Block was built in place of the old lunch hall, along with a revamped break area and a new dance hall
9. A new "Rainbow Cafe" was added
10. The former two story dance hall in the agora was revamped into a new lecture theatre.
11. The north gate was relocated

In 2019 a plan to increase the schools capacity from 9 forms of entry to 11 forms of entry in 2021 was consulted on.

In academic year 2020 Health and Social care started being taught at the school by the RS department.

Previously a foundation school administered by Newham London Borough Council, in December 2021 Lister Community School converted to academy status. It is now sponsored by the Newham Community Schools Trust.

As of September 2024, Lister will discontinue their house system in place of a year group system. Each year group will have their own form class comprising only people of the same year. Instead of a Head of House and a Pastoral Manager there will be a Head of Year and Assistant Head of Year.
