= (Un)arranged Marriage =

Novel by Bali Rai

- Author: Bali Rai
- Language: English
- Genre: Young adult fiction
- Publication date: 3 May 2001

The young-adult novel (Un)arranged Marriage is the first novel by English author Bali Rai, published in 2001.

== Plot summary ==
(Un)arranged Marriage is the story of Manjit (nicknamed Manny), a teenage boy living in Leicester, England. His strict Punjabi parents are disappointed in Manny's poor behaviour and grades at school, so they decide to arrange a marriage between Manny and a girl from India, whom he does not know.

Manny's parents take him to India under the pretext of visiting family, but he later finds that they have returned to England without him. His Uncle Jag, who disagrees with arranged marriage, agrees to help him leave the country. When he gets back to England, his father beats him, telling him that he still expects him to go ahead with the marriage. Manny starts working in a local supermarket in order to save money towards his escape.

Manny and his friend, Adrian, devise a plan to trick his parents into thinking that he has changed his mind about the arranged marriage. They break up the wedding party in order to allow Manny to escape the marriage and be free from his parents, but he loses his family in the process.

== Autobiographical elements ==
There are several parallels between the author, Bali Rai, and the protagonist of (Un)arranged Marriage, Manny. Both are British-Punjabi Sikhs and grew up in the multicultural city of Leicester. Like Manny, Rai also worked in a supermarket.

== Reception ==
The novel received generally positive reviews, with The Guardian's Kit Spring calling it an "absorbing and engaging first novel" and "highly readable". Books for Keeps magazine praised Rai for his "vitality and freshness", as well as his "ear for dialogue", but criticized his "lack of characterisation and convincing plotting".
