= Bali Rai =

English author

- Born: 30 November 1971 (age 54); Leicester, Leicestershire, England
- Occupation: Novelist
- Writing career
- Language: English
- Genre: Young adult fiction
- Notable works: (Un)arranged Marriage, Rani and Sukh, Killing Honour
- Website: www.balirai.co.uk

Bali Rai (born 30 November 1971) is a British author of children's and young adult fiction.

== Early life ==
Rai was born in Leicester in 1971, to Punjabi parents. At the age of eleven, he read The Secret Diary of Adrian Mole by Sue Townsend, which inspired him to take up writing. He has also cited Roald Dahl as an early influence on his writing. He attended Judgemeadow Community College, moving to Wyggeston and Queen Elizabeth I College for sixth form.

In 1991, Rai moved to London to study at South Bank University, graduating with a 2:1 in politics. He stayed in London for two years after graduating, but was forced to return to Leicester due to personal circumstances. He had a number of jobs, including working for a supermarket, in telesales, and managing a bar. He began to write his first novel, (Un)arranged Marriage, during this period.

== Writing career ==
Bali Rai showed parts of his debut novel, (Un)arranged Marriage, to literary agent Jennifer Luithlen, who agreed to represent him. Once the novel had been edited, Rai signed a contract with Transworld. The novel was published in 2001 to critical acclaim.

Rani & Sukh, which Rai described as a "true mash-up of Shakespeare, Bollywood and Punjabi folk tales", was published in 2004 and later became a GCSE set-text. He has also written several books for dyslexia-friendly publisher Barrington Stoke, such as Dream On and its sequel Game On. His work has been published in various anthologies, including the 2017 book Here I Stand, raising money and awareness for the human rights charity Amnesty International.

Rai has made appearances on television and radio to discuss racism, his writing, and promoting reading for pleasure. He has also been an ambassador for The Reading Agency's Reading Ahead programme, and was BookTrust's sixth online writer-in-residence. In 2019 he became an Ambassador for audiobook charity Listening Books.

In 2014, Rai received an honorary doctorate from De Montfort University in Leicester.

== Awards ==
Year	Award
2002	Angus Book Award, for (Un)arranged Marriage
2002	Leicester Children's Book Award, for (Un)arranged Marriage
2002	Stockport Schools' Book Award, for (Un)arranged Marriage
2004	Calderdale Book of the Year, for The Crew
2004	Leicester Children's Book Award, for The Crew
2004	North Lanarkshire Book Award, for (Un)arranged Marriage
2005	IBBY Sweden Silverstjärnor (Silver Star), for the Swedish translation of Rani and Sukh
2005	Redbridge Teenage Book Award, for Rani and Sukh
2006	Renfrewshire Teenage Book Award, for Rani and Sukh
2011	North East Teenage Book Award, for Killing Honour
2014	Honorary doctorate from De Montfort University, Leicester
2015	Leeds Book Award, for Web of Darkness
2015	Shropshire Teenage Book Award, for Web of Darkness
2015	Southern Schools Book Award, for Web of Darkness

== Works ==
- (Un)arranged Marriage (2001)
- The Crew (2003)
- What's Your Problem? (2003)
- Rani and Sukh (2004)
- The Whisper (2005)
- Dominoes and Other Stories (2005)
- The Last Taboo (2006)
- The Angel Collector (2007)
- City of Ghosts (2009)
- Killing Honour (2011)
- The Guru and The King (2012)
- Fire City (2012)
- Demon Hunter (2012)
- The Night Run (2014)
- Kiss of Death (2014)
- Web of Darkness (2014)
- Tales from India (2017)
- Doctor Who: Rebellion on Treasure Island (2023)

=== Soccer Squad series ===
- Starting Eleven (2008)
- Missing! (2008)
- Stars! (2008)
- Glory! (2008)

=== Tales from Devana High series ===
- Concrete Chips (2004)
- Sold as Seen (2005)
- Jugglin' (2006)
- Trouble (2013)
- Secrets (2013)

=== Barrington Stoke ===
- Dream On (2002)
- Two Timer (2005)
- Revenge of the Number Two (2007)
- Are You Kidding? (2008)
- Them and Us (2009)
- The Gun (2011)
- Shivers (2013)
- Old Dog, New Tricks (2014)
- Game On (2015), sequel to Dream On
- The Harder They Fall (2017)

=== Non-fiction ===
- Politics: Cutting Through the Crap (2006)

=== Contributor ===
Bali Rai has contributed short stories to a number of anthologies, including:

- Thirteen (2005)
- Losing It, edited by Keith Gray (2010)
- How to be a Boy, edited by Tony Bradman (2011)
- The Library Book (2012)
- Love Hurts, edited by Malorie Blackman (2015)
- Here I Stand, by Amnesty International (2017)
