= Torquay Academy =

Coordinates: 50°28′47″N 3°32′32″W

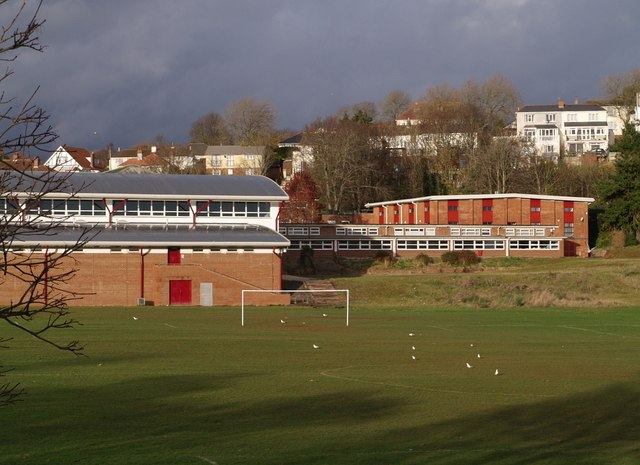

Location
- Cricketfield Road; Torquay, Devon, TQ2 7NU; England

Information
- Type: Academy
- Motto: To aspire and to achieve
- Established: 1938
- Department for Education URN: 138370 Tables
- Ofsted: Reports
- Chairman of Governors: Vince Flower
- Head teacher: Steve Margetts
- Gender: Coeducational
- Age: 11 to 18
- Enrolment: 1,080
- Colours: Grey , white
- Website: http://www.TQacademy.co.uk

Torquay Academy is a coeducational secondary school and sixth form located in Torquay, Devon, England. Before 1 September 2012, it was known as Torquay Community College and historically, known as Audley Park School.

== About ==
The academy is part of a multi-academy trust in partnership with Torquay Boys' Grammar School.

The headteacher is Steve Margetts. In January 2010, the school moved into a new building as part of the Building Schools for the Future scheme. In March 2012, a short film about the school's innovative design was made by ITN and broadcast at the Building Schools Exhibition and Conference.

Following its latest Ofsted inspection in February 2020, the school was rated "good" on all criteria. The inspectors noted 'Pupils are proud to attend Torquay Academy. The school has high ambitions for pupils, who say they feel inspired to do their best.' In 2016 the school received a national award, winning the SSAT Educational Outcome Award in recognition of its excellent GCSE results and improvement.
