= Priority School Building Programme =

United Kingdom government programme

The Priority School Building Programme was a United Kingdom government scheme launched in 2014 to address the capital investment needs of schools most in need of urgent repair.

The £4.4 billion programme was designed to rebuild and refurbish school buildings in the worst condition across the country. It was a replacement for the Building Schools for the Future programme, which had been set up in 2003 to cover the period 2005–2020 but was cancelled in 2010.

There were two phases of the programme, covering a total of 537 schools. Under the first phase, 260 schools were rebuilt and/or refurbished: 214 through capital grant and 46 using the PF2 private finance model. The first school opened in April 2014 and most of the rest opened before the end of 2017. The second phase focused on individual blocks rather than whole schools. 277 schools were to be rebuilt and refurbished using capital grant, by the end of 2021.
