= Kelmscott School =

Location
- 245 Markhouse Road; Walthamstow, Greater London, E17 8DN; England
- Coordinates: 51.575556°N 0.028104°W

Information
- Type: Community, Comprehensive School
- Motto: "Putting Learning First"
- Local authority: Waltham Forest
- Department for Education URN: 103105 Tables
- Ofsted: Reports
- Head teacher: Sam Jones
- Gender: Mixed
- Age: 11 to 16
- Enrolment: 900
- Website: http://www.kelmscottschool.co.uk

Kelmscott School is a secondary comprehensive school in Walthamstow, East London, England. The school has approximately 900 pupils aged 11–16. In 2008 the school underwent an £11.2m refurbishment as part of the Building Schools for the Future program. The current headteacher is Mr Sam Jones.

Kelmscott is a co-educational community school for pupils aged 11 to 16. All aspects of the school including ‘pupil achievement’, ‘behaviour’ and ‘quality of teaching’ were deemed to be very good at their last Ofsted inspection. The school's most recent Ofsted Inspection in January 2020 describes Kelmscott "continues to be a Good school" category.

== Notable former pupils ==
The professional footballer Fabrice Muamba is a former student of Kelmscott School, along with fellow alumnus Marvin McCoy who plays for League 1 side Wycombe Wanderers.
