= Kings Meadow Island =

Former island on the River Tyne, England

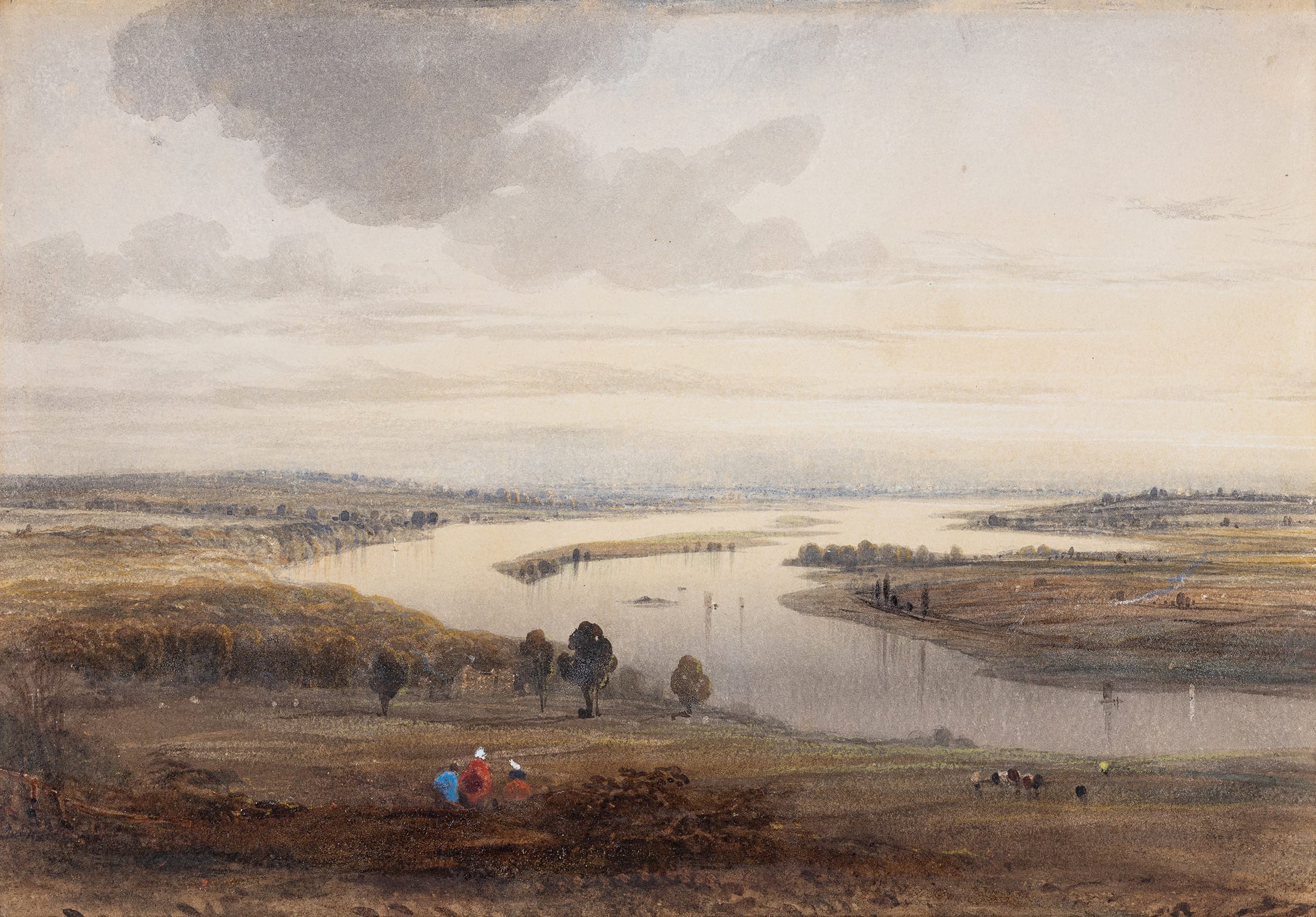
- The Tyne at Gateshead by Thomas Miles Richardson
- Interactive map of Kings Meadow Island

Geography
- Location: River Tyne
- Coordinates: 54.9591°N 1.6434°W

Administration
- England
- County: Northumberland

Additional information
- Removed between 1862 and 1887

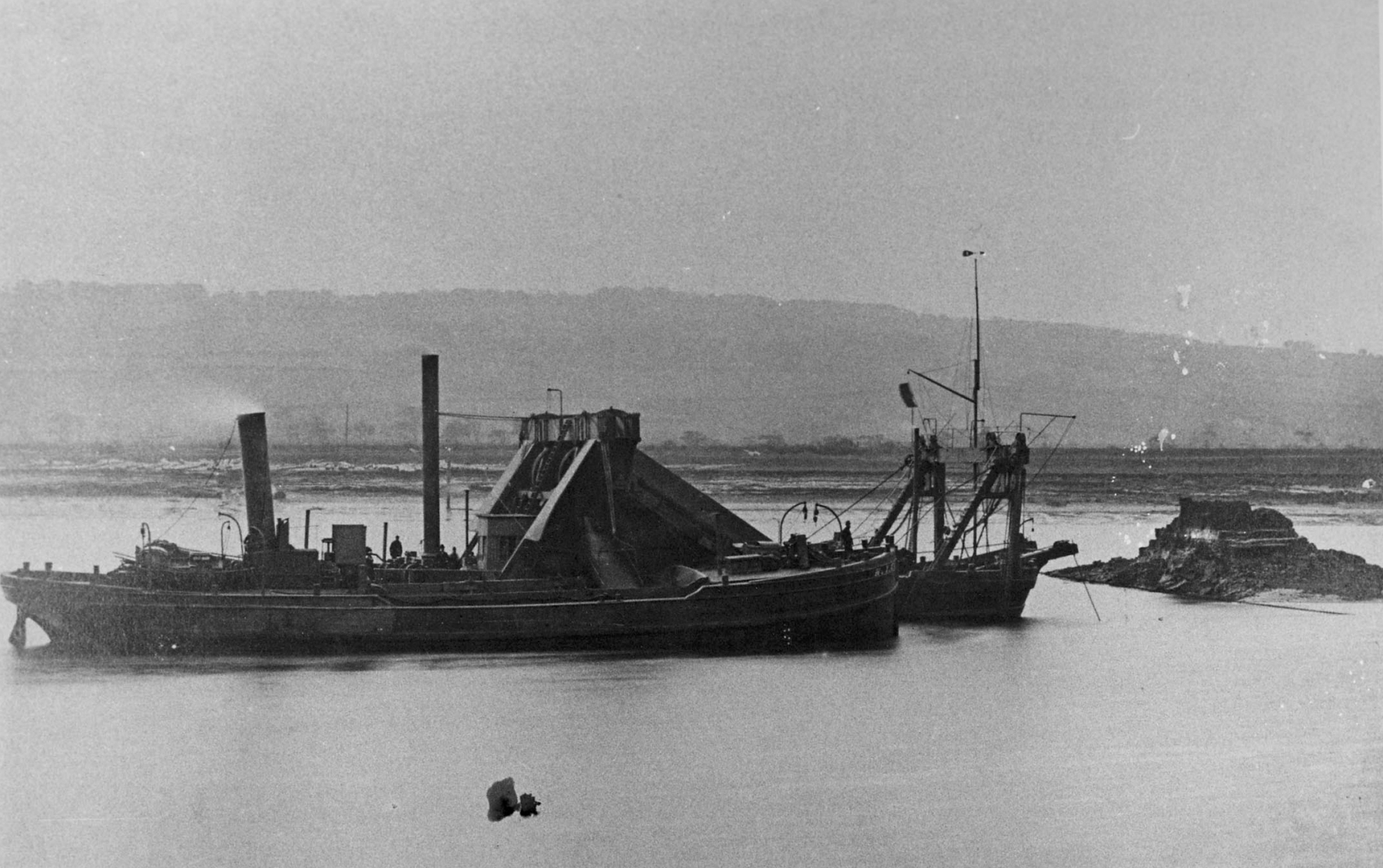
The dredging of Kings Meadow Island

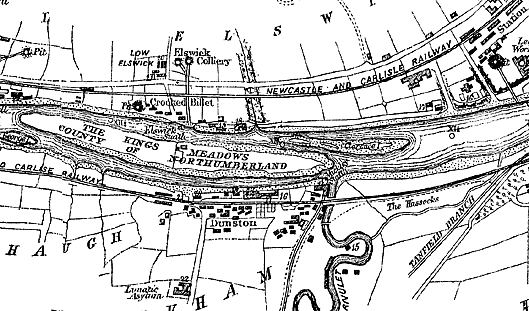
Kings Meadow Island on a map pre-dating the 1880s.

Kings Meadow Island (alternatively King's Meadow Island, or Kingsmeadow Island) was a flat island in the River Tyne in Northumberland, between Elswick on the north bank and Dunston on the south, near Gateshead, England. A smaller island, Little Annie lay nearby to the southwest whilst the two Clarenee Islands lay to the north of the east end of Kings Meadow. The islands were removed by dredging between 1862 and 1887 by the Tyne Improvement Commission, to make it easier for river traffic to pass.

During the siege of Newcastle, in 1644, Scottish sentries were posted on Kings Meadow, shooting dead at least one man who attempted to sail past.

In the 18th century, a public house, the 'Countess of Coventry', operated on Kings Meadow.

A regatta and horse racing were held on Kings Meadow, annually until 1850. It was also used for greyhound racing.

Kingsmeadow Community Comprehensive School, nearby, is named after the island.
