= John Henry Newman Catholic College =

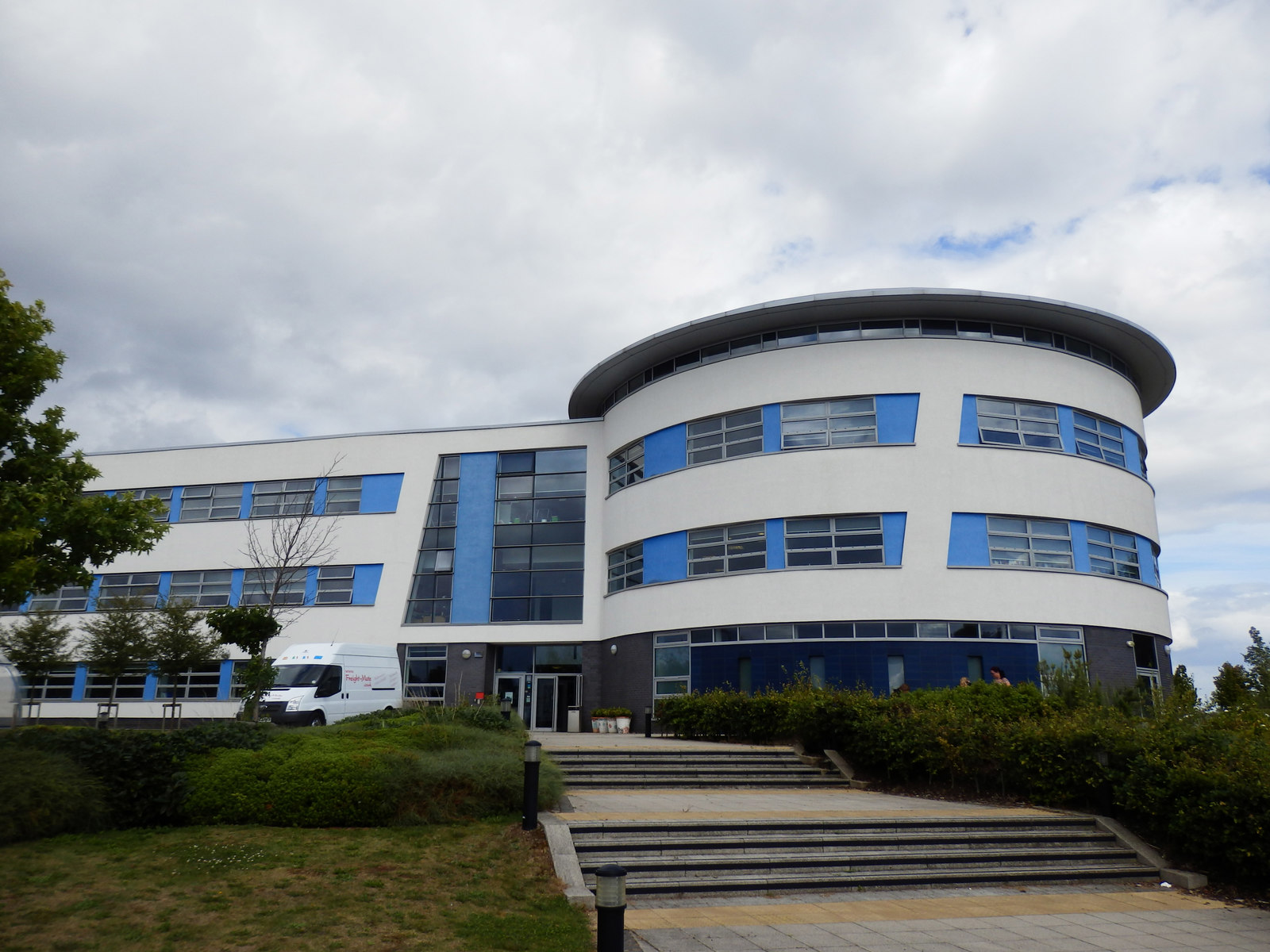
- The main school building in 2014

Location
- Chelmsley Road; Fordbridge; Birmingham, B37 5GA; England; 52.4835°N 1.7511°W

Information
- Type: Academy
- Motto: "Heart Speaks to Heart"
- Religious affiliation: Roman Catholic
- Local authority: Solihull
- Department for Education URN: 136347 Tables
- Ofsted: Reports
- Gender: Coeducational
- Age: 11 to 18
- Colours: Red and gold
- Website: Official website

John Henry Newman Catholic College (JHNCC), formerly Archbishop Grimshaw School, is an English Catholic School located in Fordbridge, North Solihull.

== History ==
It was formerly called Archbishop Grimshaw before 2011, when the school converted to academy status and the name of the school was changed to the John Henry Newman Catholic College. With an Ofsted report of outstanding in 2012/2013.
