= Anthony Thomas (English footballer) =

English footballer

Personal information
- Full name: Anthony Christopher Thomas
- Date of birth: 30 August 1982 (age 44)
- Place of birth: Hammersmith, England
- Height: 5 ft 11 in (1.80 m)
- Position: Striker

Senior career*
Years	Team	Apps	(Gls)
2005–2007	Hemel Hempstead Town		
2007–2008	Barnet	26	(4)
2007	→ Cambridge City (loan)	4	(0)
2008	Stevenage Borough	11	(0)
2008–2009	Hemel Hempstead Town		
2009–2011	Farnborough	25	(5)
2010	→ Hendon (loan)	8	(3)
2010	→ Slough Town (loan)	3	(0)
2011	→ Brackley Town (loan)		
2011	→ Maidenhead United (loan)	10	(3)
2011	Maidenhead United	16	(6)
2012	Bromley	15	(1)
2012–2013	Lewes	13	(2)
2013	Wingate & Finchley		
2013–2014	Hendon	41	(10)
2013	→ Beaconsfield SYCOB (loan)	3	(0)
2014–2015	Canvey Island	20	(0)
2015	Ware	19	(4)
2015–2016	Chalfont St Peter	27	(1)
2016–2019	Uxbridge	53	(12)
2019	Hatfield Town	3	(3)
2019–2020	Egham Town	33	(18)
2020	Broadfields United	5	(1)
- * Club domestic league appearances and goals

Anthony Thomas (born 30 August 1982) is an English retired footballer who played as a striker.

== Career ==
His career began at Hemel Hempstead Town, where he scored 72 goals in two seasons. His first goal for Barnet came against Dagenham & Redbridge, and burst a hole in the side netting. He was loaned out to Cambridge City in October 2007, and was released at the end of the season. Thomas then joined Stevenage Borough on 17 May 2008. He struggled to make the first team and rejoined Hemel Hempstead Town after 11 appearances, scoring a brace in his first game against Yate Town.

On 27 January 2012 he joined Bromley, scoring on his debut in their 3–0 win over Weston-Super-Mare, helping Bromley win their first game since October. He subsequently played for Wingate & Finchley, and in June 2013 signed for Hendon. He went on to join Canvey Island a year later before joining Ryman League side Ware in early 2015. In August 2016, Thomas joined Uxbridge. He signed for Egham Town in March 2019.

== Personal life ==
In February 2009, Thomas, and his then partner, were banned from owning a dog for 10 years and given three-month sentences after neglecting and beating a puppy over a three-month period in 2007, leaving the seven-month-old puppy suffering a broken back, cracked ribs and severe bruising. Just one week earlier, Thomas was given a two-year conditional discharge at Snaresbrook Crown Court after being convicted of assault for beating up a motorist in a 2007 road rage attack.
