= Kingsmeadow Community Comprehensive School =

Location
- Market Lane; Gateshead, Tyne and Wear, NE11 9NX; England; 54°57′01″N 1°39′12″W

Information
- Type: Community school
- Established: 1990 (present school)
- Local authority: Gateshead
- Department for Education URN: 108410 Tables
- Ofsted: Reports
- Gender: Coeducational
- Age: 11 to 18
- Enrolment: 900~
- Website: www.kingsmeadow.org.uk

Kingsmeadow Community Comprehensive School is a coeducational secondary school and sixth form based in Dunston, Metropolitan Borough of Gateshead, Tyne and Wear, England. It was opened in 1990 on the site of Dunston Comprehensive School, combining the existing Saltwell Senior High, Dunston Comprehensive and Hillhead Junior High schools. The school's name came from Kings Meadow Island in the Tyne, which was dredged away in the nineteenth century to allow large ships up the river. The school has been awarded specialist Business and Enterprise College status.

The school serves the communities of Dunston, Winlaton, Bensham, Lobley Hill, Team Valley and Swalwell.

Kingsmeadow won the DFES School Achievement Award in 2001, 2002 and 2003 and has a Life Long Learning Centre (LLLC).

In 2007, Kingsmeadow began construction of a new school building. The Duke of Kent visited on 20 March 2009 to officially open the new school building.

In 2009 the Speaker of the House of Commons, John Bercow visited the school.

In March 2010 the school was inspected by Ofsted and deemed "good with outstanding features". In April 2015 the school was inspected by Ofsted and deemed "good" but "requires improvement". Key Stage 4 performance in 2015 saw 32% of students achieving 5+ A*-C GCSEs; significantly below the Gateshead local authority average of 58.1% and the national average of 53.8%.
