= Bílov =

Bílov may refer to places in the Czech Republic:

- Bílov (Nový Jičín District), a municipality and village in the Moravian-Silesian Region
- Bílov (Plzeň-North District), a municipality and village in the Plzeň Region
- Bílov, former name of Bělá (Opava District) in the Moravian-Silesian Region
