= 2004–05 Chelsea F.C. season =

English football club season

Chelsea
2004–05 season
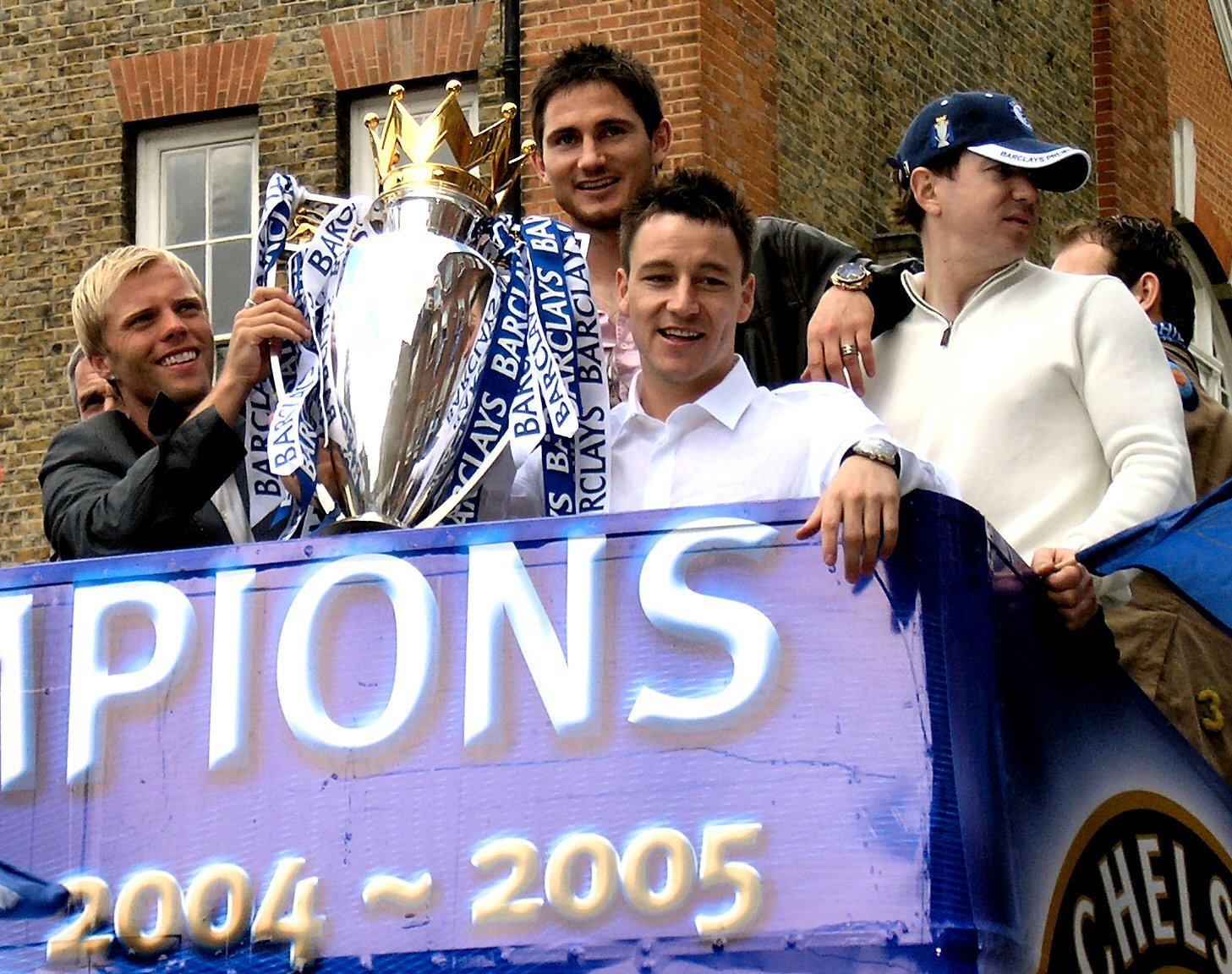
- (from left to right) Eiður Guðjohnsen, Frank Lampard, and John Terry celebrating Chelsea's first Premier League title
- Owner: Roman Abramovich
- Chairman: Bruce Buck
- Manager: José Mourinho
- Stadium: Stamford Bridge
- Premier League: 1st
- FA Cup: Fifth round
- League Cup: Winners
- UEFA Champions League: Semi-finals
- Top goalscorer: League: Frank Lampard (13); All: Frank Lampard (19)
- Highest home attendance: 42,328 (vs. Newcastle United, 4 December 2004)
- Lowest home attendance: 33,945 (vs. CSKA Moscow, 20 October 2004)
Home colours	Away colours	Third colours

The 2004–05 season was Chelsea Football Club's 91st competitive season, 13th consecutive season in the Premier League and 99th year as a club. Managed by José Mourinho during his first season at the club, Chelsea won the Premier League title (their first league title in 50 years) and the League Cup.

The season was historic for the vast number of Premier League records set during the season. The list of achievements included; most points won in a season (95), most away wins in a season (15), most clean sheets kept in a season (25), fewest goals conceded away in a season (9), most wins in a season (29) and fewest goals conceded in a season (15). As of the 2025-26 Premier League season, this Chelsea side still holds the defensive records for most clean sheets and fewest goals conceded in a Premier League season.

After missing out on the league title to the unbeaten Arsenal in the previous season, Chelsea continued spending large sums of money in order to build a squad capable of challenging for honours. They were in their second season under the ownership of Roman Abramovich, enabling them to sign five players for more than £10 million each, including Ivorian striker Didier Drogba from Marseille and defender Ricardo Carvalho from Mourinho's former club, Porto. Portuguese defender Paulo Ferreira also followed Mourinho to Chelsea from Porto.

In the Champions League, Chelsea aimed to improve upon their semi-final placing the previous year, but in the end only matched their achievement after losing to Liverpool. They also exited the FA Cup in the fifth round to eventual semi-finalists Newcastle United.

== Kits ==
Home	Home alt.	Away	Third	Third alt.

The team kit was produced by Umbro. The shirt sponsor was the airline Emirates; the kit bore the "Fly Emirates" logo. Chelsea's home kit, all blue with a white collar, was retained from the previous season. Their new away kit was black with grey shorts and accents. Chelsea retained last season's away kit (all white with black and blue stripes down the center) as the third kit for this season.

== Management ==
Position	Staff
Manager	(Portugal) José Mourinho
Assistant manager	(Scotland) Steve Clarke
First team coach	(Brazil) Baltemar Brito
Fitness coach	(Portugal) Rui Faria
Goalkeeping coach	(Portugal) Silvino Louro
Opposition scout	(Portugal) André Villas-Boas

== Players ==
=== First team squad ===
Squad at end of season

Note: Flags indicate national team as defined under FIFA eligibility rules; some limited exceptions apply. Players may hold more than one non-FIFA nationality.

No.	Pos.	Nation	Player
1	GK	CZE	Petr Čech
2	DF	ENG	Glen Johnson
4	MF	FRA	Claude Makélélé (Note: Makélélé was born in Kinshasa, Zaire (now DR Congo), but was raised in France from the age of 4 and made his international debut for France in July 1995.)
5	MF	RUS	Alexey Smertin
6	DF	POR	Ricardo Carvalho
8	MF	ENG	Frank Lampard
9	FW	SCG	Mateja Kežman
10	MF	ENG	Joe Cole
11	MF	IRL	Damien Duff
13	DF	FRA	William Gallas
14	MF	CMR	Geremi
15	FW	CIV	Didier Drogba
16	MF	NED	Arjen Robben
18	DF	ENG	Wayne Bridge

No.	Pos.	Nation	Player
19	MF	ENG	Scott Parker
20	DF	POR	Paulo Ferreira
22	FW	ISL	Eiður Guðjohnsen
23	GK	ITA	Carlo Cudicini
24	FW	FIN	Mikael Forssell (Note: Forssell was born in Steinfurt, West Germany (now Germany), but also qualified to represent Finland internationally and made his international debut for Finland in June 1999.)
26	DF	ENG	John Terry (captain)
27	MF	CZE	Jiří Jarošík
29	DF	GER	Robert Huth
30	MF	POR	Tiago
31	MF	POR	Filipe Oliveira
32	DF	SCO	Steven Watt
33	MF	POR	Nuno Morais
40	GK	ENG	Lenny Pidgeley
42	MF	ENG	Anthony Grant

=== Left club during season ===
Note: Flags indicate national team as defined under FIFA eligibility rules; some limited exceptions apply. Players may hold more than one non-FIFA nationality.

No.	Pos.	Nation	Player
3	DF	NGR	Celestine Babayaro (to Newcastle United)
7	FW	ROU	Adrian Mutu (released)

No.	Pos.	Nation	Player
17	MF	ENG	Craig Rocastle (to Sheffield Wednesday)
27	MF	CYP	Alexis Nicolas (Note: Nicolas was born in Westminster, England, but also qualified to represent Cyprus internationally and represented Cyprus at U-21 level.) (to Brighton & Hove Albion)

=== Reserve squad ===
The following players did not appear for the first-team this season.

Note: Flags indicate national team as defined under FIFA eligibility rules; some limited exceptions apply. Players may hold more than one non-FIFA nationality.

No.	Pos.	Nation	Player
41	GK	BEL	Yves Ma-Kalambay (Note: Ma-Kalambay was born in Brussels, Belgium, and represented Belgium at U-23 level and was also called up to the senior squad without playing, but also qualified to represent the DR Congo through his father and made his international debut for DR Congo in May 2010.)
43	MF	ENG	Joe Tillen
—	DF	ENG	Michael Mancienne
—	DF	ENG	Adrian Pettigrew
—	DF	ENG	Dean Smith
—	DF	ENG	Sam Tillen

No.	Pos.	Nation	Player
—	DF	ENG	Danny Woodards
—	MF	ENG	Danny Hollands
—	MF	ENG	James Simmonds (Note: Simmonds was born in Hammersmith, England, but also qualified to represent the Republic of Ireland internationally and represented the Republic of Ireland at U-18 level.)
—	MF	ENG	Jimmy Smith
—	MF	GER	Sebastian Kneißl

=== Under-18s ===
The following players spent most of the season playing for the under-18s, but may have appeared for the reserve team.

Note: Flags indicate national team as defined under FIFA eligibility rules; some limited exceptions apply. Players may hold more than one non-FIFA nationality.

No.	Pos.	Nation	Player
—	GK	ENG	James Russell (Note: Russell was born in Welwyn Garden City, England, but also qualified to represent the Republic of Ireland internationally and represented the Republic of Ireland at U-21 level.)
—	GK	GER	Nick Hamann
—	DF	ENG	Joe Anderson
—	DF	ENG	Ed Brand
—	DF	ENG	Shaun Cummings (Note: Cummings was born in Hammersmith and Fulham, England, but also qualified to represent Jamaica internationally and made his international debut for Jamaica in September 2013.)
—	DF	ENG	Ben Hudell
—	DF	ENG	Sam Hutchinson
—	DF	ENG	Harry Worley
—	MF	ENG	Liam Bridcutt (Note: Bridcutt was born in Reading, England, but also qualified to represent Scotland internationally through his grandfather and made his international debut for Scotland in March 2013.)
—	MF	ENG	Jack Cork

No.	Pos.	Nation	Player
—	MF	ENG	James Younghusband (Note: Younghusband was born in Ashford, England, but also qualified to represent the Philippines internationally through his mother and made his international debut for the Philippines in 2006.)
—	MF	POR	Filipe Morais
—	MF	RSA	Dean Furman
—	MF	SOM	Hamze Ismail
—	MF	WAL	Andy King (Note: King was born in Barnstaple, England, but also qualified to represent Wales internationally through his grandfather and represented Wales at U-19 and U-21 level before making his international debut for Wales in May 2009.)
—	MF	ENG	Dean McDonald
—	FW	ENG	Jack Watkins
—	FW	ENG	Phil Younghusband
—	FW	ITA	Michele Gallaccio
—	FW	ENG	Eric Odihambo

== Transfers ==
=== In ===
#	Pos	Player	From	Fee	Date
20	DF	(Portugal) Paulo Ferreira	(Portugal) Porto	£13,200,000	23 June 2004
1	GK	(Czech Republic) Petr Čech	(France) Rennes	£7,100,000	1 July 2004
16	MF	(Netherlands) Arjen Robben	(Netherlands) PSV	£12,200,000	1 July 2004
9	FW	(Serbia and Montenegro) Mateja Kežman	(Netherlands) PSV	£5,300,000	13 July 2004
15	FW	(Ivory Coast) Didier Drogba	(France) Marseille	£24,200,000	20 July 2004
30	MF	(Portugal) Tiago	(Portugal) Benfica	£10,400,000	21 July 2004
6	DF	(Portugal) Ricardo Carvalho	(Portugal) Porto	£19,850,000	28 July 2004
33	DF	(Portugal) Nuno Morais	(Portugal) Penafiel	£2,300,000	29 August 2004
27	MF	(Czech Republic) Jiří Jarošík	(Russia) CSKA Moscow	£3,100,000	6 January 2005

=== Out ===
#	Pos	Player	To	Fee	Date
7	MF	(Netherlands) Winston Bogarde	Unattached	Released	1 July 2004
20	MF	(Argentina) Juan Sebastián Verón	(Italy) Internazionale	Loan	1 July 2004
9	FW	(Netherlands) Jimmy Floyd Hasselbaink	(England) Middlesbrough	Free	1 July 2004
32	FW	(Finland) Mikael Forssell	(England) Birmingham City	Loan	1 July 2004
6	DF	(France) Marcel Desailly	(Qatar) Al-Gharafa	Free	6 July 2004
15	DF	(Netherlands) Mario Melchiot	(England) Birmingham City	Free	9 July 2004
17	MF	(France) Emmanuel Petit	Unattached	Released	July 2004
12	MF	(Croatia) Mario Stanić	N/A	Retired	9 July 2004
30	MF	(Denmark) Jesper Grønkjær	(England) Birmingham City	£2.2 million	12 July 2004
39	FW	(England) Carlton Cole	(England) Aston Villa	Loan	14 July 2004
21	FW	(Argentina) Hernán Crespo	(Italy) Milan	Loan	15 July 2004
34	GK	(Scotland) Neil Sullivan	(England) Leeds United	Free	31 July 2004
24	MF	(Netherlands) Boudewijn Zenden	(England) Middlesbrough	Free	2 August 2004
31	GK	(Italy) Marco Ambrosio	(Switzerland) Grasshoppers	Free	11 August 2004

=== Overall transfer activity ===
==== Spending ====
Summer: ▼£91,350,000

Winter: ▼£3,000,000

Total: ▼£94,350,000

==== Income ====
Summer: ▲£2,200,000

Winter: £0

Total: ▲£2,200,000

==== Expenditure ====
Summer: ▼£89,150,000

Winter: ▼£3,000,000

Total: ▼£92,150,000

== Premier League ==
A total of 20 teams competed in the Premier League in the 2004–05 season. Each team played 38 matches; two against every other team and one match at each club's stadium. Three points were awarded for each win, one point per draw, and none for defeats. At the end of the season the top two teams qualified for the group stages of the UEFA Champions League; teams in third and fourth needed to play a qualifier.

The provisional fixture list was released on 24 June 2004, but was subject to change in the event of clashes with other competitions, international football, inclement weather, or matches being selected for television coverage.

=== August–October ===
Chelsea opened their Premier League campaign at home against a depleted Manchester United side on 15 August 2004. Eiður Guðjohnsen's 14th-minute goal was enough to separate the two sides, 1–0. The result was followed by another 1–0 win a weekend later, this time away at Birmingham City thanks to a strike by substitute Joe Cole. A few days later, Chelsea journeyed across London to Selhurst Park to face newly promoted Crystal Palace. A Didier Drogba debut goal for his new club (a header from a Celestine Babayaro cross) and a controlled, outside-the-box effort by Tiago were enough to ensure a 0–2 win and maintain Chelsea's 100 per cent start. Chelsea concluded August with a 2–1 home win over Southampton. James Beattie gave the visitors a shock lead after 12 seconds (the fastest Premier League goal of the season and Chelsea's first conceded); Beattie subsequently scored an own goal at the other end following a Chelsea corner, and a Frank Lampard penalty four minutes short of half-time set Chelsea on their way to all three points, leaving them in second place (behind fellow 100 percenters Arsenal on goal difference).

Due to the international fixtures, Chelsea did not play again until 11 September, dropping their first points of the season in a 0–0 draw at Aston Villa, but both sides were not without their chances to break the deadlock, Drogba having a penalty claim turned down and being booked for diving in the process. A second successive 0–0 draw, at home to Tottenham Hotspur, meant they lost ground on defending champions and leaders Arsenal, falling two points behind. Chelsea later claimed their first win of the month courtesy of a free-kick routine finished by Drogba nine minutes from time away at Middlesbrough one week later to give them a vital 0–1 win. At the end of September 2004, Chelsea were still occupying second place, two points behind Arsenal.

Chelsea began October with yet another 1–0 win, this time against Liverpool, a Joe Cole flick from an inswinging Lampard free kick maintained their unbeaten league start. The run, however, ended after they suffered their first and only defeat of the season away at Manchester City, with Nicolas Anelka stroking home a penalty in the 11th minute that he won himself after being felled in the box by Paulo Ferreira. The result cast Chelsea further behind pace-setters Arsenal, the margin now at five points. Manager Jose Mourinho maintained his optimism regarding his side's performances despite the media bemoaning Chelsea's lack of goals and style of play, particularly in contrast to the verve of unbeaten league leaders Arsenal.

Nonetheless, Chelsea recorded one of their most emphatic victories of the season a week later, winning 4–0 at home against Blackburn Rovers, an Eiður Guðjohnsen hat-trick set them on their way to the win. The result was significant in that it closed the gap to two points, as Arsenal lost their unbeaten record in controversial fashion a day later at Old Trafford, losing 2–0 to Manchester United. Another irrefutable result, a 1–4 win away at West Bromwich Albion, pulled Chelsea level with Arsenal (but behind on goal difference) at the end of October, as the reigning champions were showing signs of faltering, narrowly earning a 2–2 draw that day.

=== November–December ===
A 1–0 home win against Everton at Stamford Bridge coupled with another draw for Arsenal allowed Chelsea to top the table for the first time in the season. A week later, they retained their two-point lead at the top thanks to a thumping 4–1 away triumph at Fulham. Despite a 2–2 home draw to Bolton, they maintained their table-topping lead after Arsenal could only manage a 1–1 draw themselves to West Brom at home on the same day; Chelsea rounded off November 2004 with a 4–0 thumping of Charlton at The Valley with Duff, Terry twice and Gudjohnsen all on the scoresheet to see Chelsea move 5 points clear at the top as Arsenal suffered their second defeat of the season at Liverpool the next day.

Chelsea began the new month as they ended the last, with a 4–0 victory, this time at home against Newcastle. In their next outing, they visited rivals Arsenal and despite going behind twice, notched twice to earn a 2–2 draw at Highbury and preserve their lead at the top of the Premier League. Chelsea won the rest of their December fixtures without conceding: 4–0 vs Norwich, 1–0 vs Aston Villa, and 2–0 away to Portsmouth - as they closed 2004 sitting top of the league, five points clear of second-placed reigning champions Arsenal.

=== January–February ===
2005 began with a trip to Anfield on New Year's Day, Joe Cole once again proved the difference between the two sides, finding the back of the net five minutes after coming on as a substitute to earn a now-routine 1–0 victory for the visitors. They went on to win all their remaining games in January to nil (2–0 vs Middlesbrough, 2–0 away at Tottenham Hotspur and 3–0 against Portsmouth), extending their commanding lead to 10 points, as rivals Arsenal continued to flounder.

As February dawned, Arsenal lost 4–2 against Manchester United at Highbury, the latter leapfrogging Arsène Wenger's Arsenal into second and prompting the Frenchman to rule his side (now 13 points behind leaders Chelsea) out of the title race. Despite Manchester United showing signs of a mid-season surge, Chelsea continued their relentless form, earning a 1–0 win at Blackburn Rovers on 2 February. In doing so, Petr Cech (who saved a penalty late on in the game to ensure Chelsea's victory) set a new record of minutes gone without conceding (781), breaking Peter Schmeichel's record of 695 with Manchester United. The eighth straight win saw the Blues move 11 points clear as their quest for a first Premier League title remained on track.

They later dropped their first points of 2005, a 0–0 stalemate at home to Manchester City, but soon returned to winning ways with a 1–0 away victory at Everton on 12 February, closing the month with a 9-point advantage over second-placed Manchester United.

=== March–April ===
Chelsea conceded their first goal in 2005, during a 3–1 win at Norwich on 5 March, to end Petr Cech's Premier League record of minutes without conceding at 1,028 (later broken by Edwin van der Sar of Manchester United in 2009). The Blues went on to register a 1–0 win over West Bromwich Albion at home and completed March with a 4–1 victory against Crystal Palace at Stamford Bridge as they closed in on their first league title for 50 years.

The penultimate month of the season opened for Chelsea with a 3–1 away win over Southampton, a well-worked team goal finished off by Eidur Gudjohnsen rounding off the result with seven minutes to spare. A week later on 9 April, Didier Drogba rescued a point for the West Londoners after Walter Pandiani had given Birmingham City a shock lead with half an hour to go at Stamford Bridge; however, their form and results elsewhere conspired to leave Chelsea needing just six points from their last six fixtures of the campaign to be assured of their first-ever Premier League title.

On 20 April, Chelsea played out a goalless draw at home against nearest rivals Arsenal with both sides (particularly the hosts) missing a myriad of opportunities to break the deadlock. But the Blues swiftly rediscovered their touch at Stamford Bridge days later against neighbours Fulham, putting them to the sword with a 3–1 result, Frank Lampard scored the pick of the goals, a crisp low drive inside the area from Arjen Robben's cut-back on the left to restore Chelsea's lead after Collins John had equalised Joe Cole's earlier opener.

The result meant Chelsea could win the title provided closest challengers Arsenal (whose form had picked up considerably towards the season's end) dropped points against Tottenham Hotspur in the North London Derby at Highbury a couple of days later, but the Gunners picked up all three points in a 1–0 win.

Chelsea travelled to Bolton's Reebok Stadium on 30 April 2005 with the knowledge a win and all three points would crown them Champions of England for the first time in half a century, and despite a tense and goalless first-half, the second half saw Lampard win a battle against a defender for a high, bouncing ball just outside the penalty area before making space for a fierce right-foot drive to give Chelsea the lead after an hour gone; it was a lead Chelsea doubled as they countered from a Bolton corner fifteen minutes later, Lampard picking up Claude Makélélé's through ball and rounding goalkeeper Jussi Jääskeläinen, slotting into an empty net for his second goal of the game to seal a conclusive 2–0 win and the league title for the Blues - Mourinho's first in English football - as the Blues sat top of the league with a now-unassailable 11-point lead after 35 games at the end of April 2005.

=== May ===
The Premier League trophy awarded to Chelsea

The final month of the season saw the new champions step on to the Stamford Bridge pitch against Charlton on 7 May, and were made to wait until just moments from time to record a 1–0 victory as Frank Lampard won a penalty in the closing stages, Claude Makélélé - who had never scored previously for the club - was given the honours and duly obliged (scoring on the rebound following the save of his initial effort by Charlton goalkeeper Dean Kiely). The game marked Chelsea's final home match of the season, therefore the trophy presentation and post-match celebrations were held afterwards in front of a capacity home crowd.

Three days later, Chelsea travelled to Old Trafford for the penultimate game of the season against third-placed Manchester United, receiving another pre-match guard of honour (customary for their remaining games since clinching the title against Bolton); and in spite of Ruud van Nistelrooy's opening goal, the Blues hit back, notching three times through Tiago, Gudjohnsen and Joe Cole late on to complete a Premier League double over United and claim a record 29th victory of the league season, moving onto 94 points.

Their final league game on 15 May 2005 ended in a 1–1 draw, away to Newcastle United in an inconsequential yet unusually ill-disciplined end-of-season fixture that saw eight yellow cards brandished; the club's top-scorer Frank Lampard scoring from the penalty spot to equalise an own goal by Geremi at the other end minutes earlier.

Chelsea completed their historic campaign with notably new Premier League records of 95 points (12 clear of second-placed Arsenal), 29 wins (14 of them at home - a record in itself), 1,025 consecutive minutes without conceding and just 15 goals conceded - suffering only one defeat all season.

=== Matches ===
15 August 2004 1	Chelsea	1–0	Manchester United	London, England
16:00 BST	Guðjohnsen 14'	Report		Stadium: Stamford Bridge; Attendance: 41,813; Referee: Graham Poll

21 August 2004 2	Birmingham City	0–1	Chelsea	Birmingham, England
15:00 BST		Report	Cole 68'	Stadium: St Andrew's; Attendance: 24,953; Referee: Barry Knight

24 August 2004 3	Crystal Palace	0–2	Chelsea	London, England
19:45 BST		Report	Drogba 27'; Tiago 78'	Stadium: Selhurst Park; Attendance: 24,953; Referee: Chris Foy

28 August 2004 4	Chelsea	2–1	Southampton	London, England
15:00 BST	Beattie 34' (o.g.); Lampard 41' (pen.)	Report	Beattie 1'	Stadium: Stamford Bridge; Attendance: 40,864; Referee: Steve Bennett

11 September 2004 5	Aston Villa	0–0	Chelsea	Birmingham, England
13:30 BST		Report		Stadium: Villa Park; Attendance: 36,691; Referee: Rob Styles

19 September 2004 6	Chelsea	0–0	Tottenham Hotspur	London, England
16:00 BST		Report		Stadium: Stamford Bridge; Attendance: 42,246; Referee: Mike Riley

25 September 2004 7	Middlesbrough	0–1	Chelsea	Middlesbrough, England
13:30 BST		Report	Drogba 81'	Stadium: Riverside Stadium; Attendance: 32,341; Referee: Mark Halsey

3 October 2004 8	Chelsea	1–0	Liverpool	London, England
16:00 BST	Cole 64'	Report		Stadium: Stamford Bridge; Attendance: 42,028; Referee: Phil Dowd

16 October 2004 9	Manchester City	1–0	Chelsea	Manchester, England
17:15 BST	Anelka 11' (pen.)	Report		Stadium: City of Manchester Stadium; Attendance: 45,047; Referee: Howard Webb

23 October 2004 10	Chelsea	4–0	Blackburn Rovers	London, England
15:00 BST	Guðjohnsen 37', 38', 51' (pen.); Duff 74'	Report		Stadium: Stamford Bridge; Attendance: 41,546; Referee: Graham Poll

30 October 2004 11	West Bromwich Albion	1–4	Chelsea	West Bromwich, England
15:00 BST	Gera 56'	Report	Gallas 45'; Guðjohnsen 51'; Duff 59'; Lampard 81'	Stadium: The Hawthorns; Attendance: 27,399; Referee: Barry Knight

6 November 2004 12	Chelsea	1–0	Everton	London, England
15:00 GMT	Robben 72'	Report		Stadium: Stamford Bridge; Attendance: 41,965; Referee: Mike Riley

13 November 2004 13	Fulham	1–4	Chelsea	London, England
17:00 GMT	Diop 57'	Report	Lampard 33'; Robben 59'; Gallas 73'; Tiago 81'	Stadium: Craven Cottage; Attendance: 21,877; Referee: Uriah Rennie

20 November 2004 14	Chelsea	2–2	Bolton Wanderers	London, England
15:00 GMT	Duff 1'; Tiago 48'	Report	Davies 52'; Jaidi 87'	Stadium: Stamford Bridge; Attendance: 42,203; Referee: Dermot Gallagher

27 November 2004 15	Charlton Athletic	0–4	Chelsea	London, England
15:00 GMT		Report	Duff 4'; Terry 47', 50'; Guðjohnsen 59'	Stadium: The Valley; Attendance: 26,355; Referee: Mark Clattenburg

4 December 2004 16	Chelsea	4–0	Newcastle United	London, England
12:45 GMT	Lampard 63'; Drogba 69'; Robben 87'; Kežman 90' (pen.)	Report		Stadium: Stamford Bridge; Attendance: 42,328; Referee: Rob Styles

12 December 2004 17	Arsenal	2–2	Chelsea	London, England
16:05 GMT	Henry 2', 29'	Report	Terry 17'; Guðjohnsen 46'	Stadium: Highbury; Attendance: 38,153; Referee: Graham Poll

18 December 2004 18	Chelsea	4–0	Norwich City	London, England
15:00 GMT	Duff 10'; Lampard 34'; Robben 44'; Drogba 83'	Report		Stadium: Stamford Bridge; Attendance: 42,071; Referee: Mike Dean

26 December 2004 19	Chelsea	1–0	Aston Villa	London, England
13:00 GMT	Duff 30'	Report		Stadium: Stamford Bridge; Attendance: 42,071; Referee: Mike Dean

28 December 2004 20	Portsmouth	0–2	Chelsea	Portsmouth, England
15:00 GMT		Report	Robben 79'; Cole 90'	Stadium: Fratton Park; Attendance: 20,210; Referee: Alan Wiley

1 January 2005 21	Liverpool	0–1	Chelsea	Liverpool, England
12:45 GMT		Report	Cole 80'	Stadium: Anfield; Attendance: 43,886; Referee: Alan Wiley

4 January 2005 22	Chelsea	2–0	Middlesbrough	London, England
19:45 GMT	Drogba 15', 17'	Report		Stadium: Stamford Bridge; Attendance: 40,982; Referee: Steve Bennett

15 January 2005 23	Tottenham Hotspur	0–2	Chelsea	London, England
15:00 GMT		Report	Lampard 39' (pen.), 90'	Stadium: White Hart Lane; Attendance: 36,105; Referee: Graham Poll

22 January 2005 24	Chelsea	3–0	Portsmouth	London, England
15:00 GMT	Drogba 15', 39'; Robben 21'	Report		Stadium: Stamford Bridge; Attendance: 42,267; Referee: Mike Riley

2 February 2005 25	Blackburn Rovers	0–1	Chelsea	Blackburn, England
20:00 GMT		Report	Robben 5'	Stadium: Ewood Park; Attendance: 23,414; Referee: Uriah Rennie

6 February 2005 26	Chelsea	0–0	Manchester City	London, England
16:05 GMT		Report		Stadium: Stamford Bridge; Attendance: 42,093; Referee: Howard Webb

12 February 2005 27	Everton	0–1	Chelsea	Liverpool, England
12:45 GMT		Report	Guðjohnsen 69'	Stadium: Goodison Park; Attendance: 40,270; Referee: Mike Riley

5 March 2005 28	Norwich City	1–3	Chelsea	Norwich, England
17:15 GMT	McKenzie 64'	Report	Cole 22'; Kežman 71'; Carvalho 79'	Stadium: Carrow Road; Attendance: 24,506; Referee: Mark Halsey

15 March 2005 29	Chelsea	1–0	West Bromwich Albion	London, England
19:45 GMT	Drogba 26'	Report		Stadium: Stamford Bridge; Attendance: 41,713; Referee: Neale Barry

19 March 2005 30	Chelsea	4–1	Crystal Palace	London, England
15:00 GMT	Lampard 29'; Cole 54'; Kežman 78', 90'	Report	Riihilahti 42'	Stadium: Stamford Bridge; Attendance: 41,667; Referee: Phil Dowd

2 April 2005 31	Southampton	1–3	Chelsea	Southampton, England
17:15 GMT	Phillips 69'	Report	Lampard 22'; Guðjohnsen 39', 83'	Stadium: St Mary's Stadium; Attendance: 31,949; Referee: Mark Halsey

9 April 2005 32	Chelsea	1–1	Birmingham City	London, England
15:00 GMT	Drogba 82'	Report	Pandiani 65'	Stadium: Stamford Bridge; Attendance: 42,031; Referee: Chris Foy

20 April 2005 33	Chelsea	0–0	Arsenal	London, England
20:00 GMT		Report		Stadium: Stamford Bridge; Attendance: 41,621; Referee: Steve Bennett

23 April 2005 34	Chelsea	3–1	Fulham	London, England
12:45 GMT	Cole 17'; Lampard 64'; Guðjohnsen 87'	Report	John 41'	Stadium: Stamford Bridge; Attendance: 42,081; Referee: Alan Wiley

30 April 2005 35	Bolton Wanderers	0–2	Chelsea	Bolton, England
17:15 GMT		Report	Lampard 60', 76'	Stadium: Reebok Stadium; Attendance: 27,653; Referee: Steve Dunn

7 May 2005 36	Chelsea	1–0	Charlton Athletic	London, England
17:15 GMT	Makélélé 90+2'	Report		Stadium: Stamford Bridge; Attendance: 42,065; Referee: Mike Riley

10 May 2005 37	Manchester United	1–3	Chelsea	Manchester, England
20:00 GMT	van Nistelrooy 7'	Report	Tiago 17'; Guðjohnsen 61'; Cole 82'	Stadium: Old Trafford; Attendance: 67,832; Referee: Graham Poll

15 May 2005 38	Newcastle United	1–1	Chelsea	Newcastle upon Tyne, England
15:00 GMT	Geremi 33' (o.g.)	Report	Lampard 35' (pen.)	Stadium: St James' Park; Attendance: 52,326; Referee: Howard Webb

=== Classification ===
Pos	Team	Pld	W	D	L	GF	GA	GD	Pts	Qualification or relegation
1	Chelsea (C)	38	29	8	1	72	15	+57	95	Qualification for the Champions League group stage
2	Arsenal	38	25	8	5	87	36	+51	83	Qualification for the Champions League group stage
3	Manchester United	38	22	11	5	58	26	+32	77	Qualification for the Champions League third qualifying round
4	Everton	38	18	7	13	45	46	−1	61	Qualification for the Champions League third qualifying round
5	Liverpool	38	17	7	14	52	41	+11	58	Qualification for the Champions League first qualifying round (Note: Although they failed to qualify for the Champions League as one of the top four English clubs, Liverpool were given a special dispensation to compete as the defending champions. They were, however, forced to enter in the first qualifying round.)

Rules for classification: 1) points; 2) goal difference; 3) number of goals scored.
(C) Champions

==== Results summary ====
Overall								Home						Away					
Pld	W	D	L	GF	GA	GD	Pts	W	D	L	GF	GA	GD	W	D	L	GF	GA	GD
38	29	8	1	72	15	+57	95	14	5	0	35	6	+29	15	3	1	37	9	+28

==== Results by round ====
Round	1	2	3	4	5	6	7	8	9	10	11	12	13	14	15	16	17	18	19	20	21	22	23	24	25	26	27	28	29	30	31	32	33	34	35	36	37	38
Ground	H	A	A	H	A	H	A	H	A	H	A	H	A	H	A	H	A	H	H	A	A	H	A	H	A	H	A	A	H	H	A	H	H	H	A	H	A	A
Result	W	W	W	W	D	D	W	W	L	W	W	W	W	D	W	W	D	W	W	W	W	W	W	W	W	D	W	W	W	W	W	D	D	W	W	W	W	D
Position	4	2	2	2	2	2	2	2	2	2	2	1	1	1	1	1	1	1	1	1	1	1	1	1	1	1	1	1	1	1	1	1	1	1	1	1	1	1
Points	3	6	9	12	13	14	17	20	20	23	26	29	32	33	36	39	40	43	46	49	52	55	58	61	64	65	68	71	74	77	80	81	82	85	88	91	94	95

Source: Matches
A = Away; H = Home; W = Win; D = Draw; L = Loss

== UEFA Champions League ==
=== Group stage ===
Pos	Team	Pld	W	D	L	GF	GA	GD	Pts	Qualification	CHE	POR	CSKA	PAR
1	(England) Chelsea	6	4	1	1	10	3	+7	13	Advance to knockout stage	—	3–1	2–0	0–0
2	(Portugal) Porto	6	2	2	2	4	6	−2	8	Advance to knockout stage	2–1	—	0–0	0–0
3	(Russia) CSKA Moscow	6	2	1	3	5	5	0	7	Transfer to UEFA Cup	0–1	0–1	—	2–0
4	(France) Paris Saint-Germain	6	1	2	3	3	8	−5	5		0–3	2–0	1–3	—

14 September 2004 1	Paris Saint-Germain (France)	0 – 3	(England) Chelsea	Paris, France
19:45 BST		Report	Terry 29'; Drogba 45', 75'	Stadium: Parc des Princes; Attendance: 40,000; Referee: Manuel Mejuto González

29 September 2004 2	Chelsea (England)	3 – 1	(Portugal) Porto	London, England
19:45 BST	Smertin 7'; Drogba 50'; Terry 70'	Report	McCarthy 68'	Stadium: Stamford Bridge; Attendance: 39,237; Referee: Herbert Fandel

20 October 2004 3	Chelsea (England)	2 – 0	(Russia) CSKA Moscow	London, England
19:45 BST	Terry 9'; Guðjohnsen 45'	Report		Stadium: Stamford Bridge; Attendance: 33,945; Referee: Ľuboš Micheľ

2 November 2004 4	CSKA Moscow (Russia)	0 – 1	(England) Chelsea	Moscow, Russia
19:45 BST		Report	Robben 24'	Stadium: Lokomotiv Stadium; Attendance: 28,000; Referee: Massimo De Santis

24 November 2004 5	Chelsea (England)	0 – 0	(France) Paris Saint-Germain	London, England
19:45 BST		Report		Stadium: Stamford Bridge; Attendance: 39,626; Referee: Rene Temmink

7 December 2004 6	Porto (Portugal)	2 – 1	(England) Chelsea	Porto, Portugal
19:45 BST	Diego 60'; McCarthy 85'	Report	Duff 33'	Stadium: Estádio do Dragão; Attendance: 42,409; Referee: Massimo Busacca

=== Knockout phase ===
==== Round of 16 ====
23 February 2005 First leg	Barcelona (Spain)	2 – 1	(England) Chelsea	Barcelona, Spain
19:45 GMT	López 67'; Eto'o 73'	Report	Belletti 33' (o.g.)	Stadium: Camp Nou; Attendance: 89,000; Referee: Anders Frisk

8 March 2005 Second leg	Chelsea (England)	4 – 2 (5 – 4 agg.)	(Spain) Barcelona	London, England
19:45 BST	Guðjohnsen 8'; Lampard 17'; Duff 19'; Terry 76'	Report	Ronaldinho 27' (pen.), 38'	Stadium: Stamford Bridge; Attendance: 41,515; Referee: Pierluigi Collina

==== Quarter-finals ====
6 April 2005 First leg	Chelsea (England)	4 – 2	(Germany) Bayern Munich	London, England
19:45 BST	Cole 4'; Lampard 59', 70'; Drogba 81'	Report	Schweinsteiger 51'; Ballack 90+3' (pen.)	Stadium: Stamford Bridge; Attendance: 40,253; Referee: Pierluigi Collina

12 April 2005 Second leg	Bayern Munich (Germany)	3 – 2 (5 – 6 agg.)	(England) Chelsea	Munich, Germany
19:45 GMT	Pizarro 65'; Guerrero 90'; Scholl 90+5'	Report	Lampard 30'; Drogba 80'	Stadium: Olympiastadion; Attendance: 59,000; Referee: Manuel Enrique Mejuto Gonzalez

==== Semi-finals ====
27 April 2005 First leg	Chelsea (England)	0 – 0	(England) Liverpool	London, England
19:45 BST		Report		Stadium: Stamford Bridge; Attendance: 40,497; Referee: Alain Sars

3 May 2005 Second leg	Liverpool (England)	1 – 0 (1 – 0 agg.)	(England) Chelsea	Liverpool, England
19:45 BST	García 4'	Report		Stadium: Anfield; Attendance: 42,529; Referee: Lubos Michel

=== League Cup ===
27 October 2004 Third round	Chelsea	1 – 0	West Ham United	London
19:45 BST	Kežman 57'	Report		Stadium: Stamford Bridge; Attendance: 41,774; Referee: Andy D'Urso

10 November 2004 Fourth round	Newcastle United	0 – 2 (a.e.t.)	Chelsea	Newcastle upon Tyne
19:45 BST		Report	Guðjohnsen 100'; Robben 112'	Stadium: St James' Park; Attendance: 38,055; Referee: Steve Bennett

1 December 2004 Quarter-finals	Fulham	1 – 2	Chelsea	London
19:45 BST	McBride 74'	Report	Duff 55'; Lampard 88'	Stadium: Craven Cottage; Attendance: 14,531; Referee: Steve Dunn

12 January 2005 Semi-Final First Leg	Chelsea	0 – 0	Manchester United	London
19:45 BST		Report		Stadium: Stamford Bridge; Attendance: 41,492; Referee: Neale Barry

26 January 2005 Semi-finals second leg	Manchester United	1 – 2 (1 – 2 agg.)	Chelsea	Manchester
19:45 BST	Giggs 67'	Report	Lampard 29'; Duff 85'	Stadium: Old Trafford; Attendance: 67,000; Referee: Rob Styles

27 February 2005 Final	Liverpool	2 – 3 (a.e.t.)	Chelsea	Cardiff
19:45 BST	Riise 1'; Núñez 113'	Report	Gerrard 79' (o.g.); Drogba 107'; Kežman 112'	Stadium: Millennium Stadium; Attendance: 78,000; Referee: Steve Bennett; Man of the Match: (England) John Terry

=== FA Cup ===
8 January 2005 Third round	Chelsea	3 – 1	Scunthorpe United	London
15:00 GMT	Kežman 26'; Andy Crosby 58' (o.g.); Guðjohnsen 86'	Report	Hayes 8'	Stadium: Stamford Bridge; Attendance: 40,019; Referee: Dermot Gallagher

30 January 2005 Fourth Round	Chelsea	2 – 0	Birmingham City	London
15:00 GMT	Huth 6'; Terry 80'	[news.bbc.co.uk/sport1/hi/football/fa_cup/4197629.stm Report]		Stadium: Stamford Bridge; Attendance: 40,379; Referee: Mike Dean

20 February 2005 Fifth Round	Newcastle United	1 – 0	Chelsea	Newcastle upon Tyne
15:00 GMT	Kluivert 4'	Report		Stadium: St James' Park; Attendance: 45,740; Referee: Mark Halsey

== Statistics ==
=== Appearances and goals ===
No.	Pos	Nat	Player	Total		Premier League		Champions League		FA Cup		Football League Cup	
No.	Pos	Nat	Player	Apps	Goals	Apps	Goals	Apps	Goals	Apps	Goals	Apps	Goals
1	GK	(Czech Republic) CZE	Petr Čech	48	0	35	0	11	0	0	0	2	0
20	DF	(Portugal) POR	Paulo Ferreira	42	0	29	0	6+1	0	0+1	0	5	0
6	DF	(Portugal) POR	Ricardo Carvalho	39	1	22+3	1	10	0	1	0	3	0
26	DF	(England) ENG	John Terry	53	8	36	3	11	4	1	1	5	0
13	DF	(France) FRA	William Gallas	46	2	28	2	12	0	1	0	5	0
10	MF	(England) ENG	Joe Cole	46	9	19+9	8	8+1	1	3	0	4+2	0
4	MF	(France) FRA	Claude Makélélé	50	1	36	1	10	0	0	0	4	0
8	MF	(England) ENG	Frank Lampard	58	19	38	13	12	4	0+2	0	3+3	2
30	MF	(Portugal) POR	Tiago Mendes	51	4	21+13	4	4+7	0	2	0	4	0
11	MF	(Republic of Ireland) IRL	Damien Duff	48	10	28+2	6	8+2	2	1+1	0	5+1	2
22	FW	(Iceland) ISL	Eiður Guðjohnsen	57	16	30+7	12	9+2	2	2+1	1	1+5	1
23	GK	(Italy) ITA	Carlo Cudicini	11	0	3	0	1	0	3	0	4	0
15	FW	(Ivory Coast) CIV	Didier Drogba	41	16	18+8	10	8+1	5	1+1	0	3+1	1
16	MF	(Netherlands) NED	Arjen Robben	29	9	14+4	7	2+3	1	0+2	0	3+1	1
2	DF	(England) ENG	Glen Johnson	29	0	13+4	0	4+2	0	3	0	2+1	0
18	DF	(England) ENG	Wayne Bridge	25	0	12+3	0	4	0	2	0	4	0
3	DF	(Nigeria) NGR	Celestine Babayaro	5	0	3+1	0	0	0	0	0	1	0
5	MF	(Russia) RUS	Alexey Smertin	25	1	11+5	0	4+1	1	3	0	1	0
9	FW	(Serbia and Montenegro) SCG	Mateja Kežman	41	7	6+19	4	3+6	0	3	1	2+2	2
14	MF	(Cameroon) CMR	Geremi	20	0	6+7	0	1+3	0	2	0	1	0
29	DF	(Germany) GER	Robert Huth	15	1	6+4	0	1+3	0	1	1	0	0
27	MF	(Czech Republic) CZE	Jiří Jarošík	20	0	3+11	0	0	0	2+1	0	1+2	0
19	MF	(England) ENG	Scott Parker	11	0	1+3	0	3+1	0	0	0	3	0
7	FW	(Romania) ROU	Adrian Mutu	2	0	0+2	0	0	0	0	0	0	0
24	FW	(Finland) FIN	Mikael Forssell	2	0	0+1	0	0+1	0	0	0	0	0
31	MF	(Portugal) POR	Filipe Oliveira	1	0	0+1	0	0	0	0	0	0	0
32	DF	(Scotland) SCO	Steven Watt	2	0	0+1	0	0	0	1	0	0	0
33	DF	(Portugal) POR	Nuno Morais	4	0	0+2	0	0+1	0	1	0	0	0
40	GK	(England) ENG	Lenny Pidgeley	1	0	0+1	0	0	0	0	0	0	0
42	MF	(England) ENG	Anthony Grant	1	0	0+1	0	0	0	0	0	0	0

Statistics source. Squad details and shirt numbers from Chelsea FC 2004-05.

== Summary ==
Games played	59 (38 Premier League), 3 (FA Cup), 12 (UEFA Champions League) 6 (Football League Cup)
Games won	42 (29 Premier League), 2 (FA Cup), 6 (UEFA Champions League) 5 (Football League Cup)
Games drawn	11 (8 Premier League), 0 (FA Cup), 2 (UEFA Champions League) 1 (Football League Cup)
Games lost	6 (1 Premier League), 1 (FA Cup), 4 (UEFA Champions League) 0 (Football League Cup)
Goals scored	107 (72 Premier League), 4 (FA Cup), 21 (UEFA Champions League) 10 (Football League Cup)
Goals conceded	33 (15 Premier League), 1 (FA Cup), 13 (UEFA Champions League) 4 (Football League Cup)
Goal difference	75 (57 Premier League), 4 (FA Cup), 8 (UEFA Champions League) 6 (Football League Cup)
Clean sheets	35 (25 Premier League), 2 (FA Cup), 5 (UEFA Champions League) 3 (Football League Cup)
Most appearances	58 (England) Frank Lampard
Top scorer	19 (England) Frank Lampard
Wins	Overall: 42/59 (71.28%)

== Awards ==
=== Player ===
No.	Player	Award
1	(Czech Republic) Petr Čech	PFA Team of the Year & Golden Glove
8	(England) Frank Lampard	April Player of the Month, PFA Fans' Player of the Year, Premier League Player of the Season, FWA Footballer of the Year & PFA Team of the Year
10	(England) Joe Cole	March Player of the Month
16	(Netherlands) Arjen Robben	November Player of the Month & PFA Team of the Year
26	(England) John Terry	January Player of the Month, PFA Player of the Year & PFA Team of the Year

=== Manager ===
Manager	Award
(Portugal) José Mourinho	November Manager of the Month, January Manager of the Month & Premier League Manager of the Season
