= Gallaccio =

Gallaccio is a surname. Notable people with the surname include:

- Anya Gallaccio (born 1963), Scottish artist
- George Gallaccio (born 1938), British television producer
- Michele Gallaccio (born 1986), Italian footballer
