= Petr Čech =

Czech footballer and ice hockey player (born 1982)

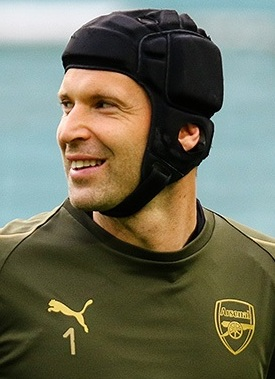
- Čech with Arsenal in 2019

Personal information
- Born: 20 May 1982 (age 44) Plzeň, Czechoslovakia
- Education: Longford International College (MBA)
- Height: 1.96 m (6 ft 5 in)

Sport
- Sport: Association football Ice hockey
Association football career
- Position: Goalkeeper
Youth career
- 1989–1999: Viktoria Plzeň
Senior career*
Years	Team	Apps	(Gls)
1999–2001	Chmel Blšany	27	(0)
2001–2002	Sparta Prague	27	(0)
2002–2004	Rennes	70	(0)
2004–2015	Chelsea	333	(0)
2015–2019	Arsenal	110	(0)
Total		567	(0)
International career
1997–1998	Czech Republic U15	3	(0)
1998–1999	Czech Republic U16	15	(0)
1999	Czech Republic U17	3	(0)
1999–2000	Czech Republic U18	13	(0)
2000–2001	Czech Republic U20	7	(0)
2001–2002	Czech Republic U21	15	(0)
2002–2016	Czech Republic	124	(0)
Medal record
Men's football
Representing Czech Republic
UEFA European Under-21 Championship
Winner	2002 Switzerland
- * Club domestic league appearances and goals
Ice hockey career
- Weight: 92 kg (203 lb; 14 st 7 lb)
- Position: Goaltender
- Catches: Right
- NIHL 2 team Former teams: Haringey Huskies; Guildford Phoenix; Chelmsford Chieftains; Oxford City Stars; Belfast Giants
- Playing career: 2019–present

Petr Čech (Czech pronunciation: [pɛtr̩ ˈtʃɛx]; born 20 May 1982) is a Czech former professional football goalkeeper and current ice hockey goaltender who plays for the Haringey Huskies of the NIHL Division 2 South. He has been described as one of the greatest goalkeepers of all time, (Note: Attributed to multiple sources:) and as the greatest goalkeeper in Premier League history. (Note: Attributed to multiple sources:)

Čech began his senior career at Chmel Blšany in 1999, where he played sporadically for two seasons prior to relocating to Sparta Prague in 2001. At age 19, Čech became a first team regular, and his single campaign with the club saw him register a league record of not conceding a goal in 903 competitive minutes. This led to his first move abroad, when he relocated to France to join Ligue 1 side Rennes for a fee of €5.5 million (£3.9 million) in 2002.

In France, Čech starred in an under-performing team, and was the subject of a then club-record transfer for a goalkeeper when he moved to Premier League side Chelsea for a fee of £7 million (€9.8 million) in 2004. In his eleven-year spell at Chelsea, Čech made 494 appearances in all competitions, making him their seventh most capped player of all time. He also helped the club win four Premier League titles, four FA Cups, three League Cups, one UEFA Champions League title, and one UEFA Europa League title. Čech also holds Chelsea's all-time record for clean sheets, with 228. Čech departed Chelsea in 2015 to join city rivals Arsenal for a fee of £10 million, where he won another FA Cup before retiring in 2019.

A Czech international, Čech made his debut with the Czech Republic in 2002, and is the most capped player in the history of the Czech national team, with 124 caps. He represented his country at the 2006 World Cup, as well as the 2004, 2008, 2012, and 2016 European Championships. He was voted into the Euro 2004 All-Star team after helping the Czechs reach the semi-finals, and served as the team's captain, prior to retiring from international competition in 2016. Čech also holds the record for the most Czech Footballer of the Year and Czech Golden Ball wins.

Čech holds a number of goalkeeping records, including the Premier League record for fewest appearances required to reach 100 clean sheets, having done so in 180 appearances, the most clean sheets in a season (24), as well as the record for the most clean sheets in Premier League history (202). Čech is also the only goalkeeper to have won the Premier League Golden Glove with two separate clubs, and has won it a joint record four times; in the 2004–05, 2009–10, 2013–14 and the 2015–16 seasons. He was voted the IFFHS World's Best Goalkeeper in 2005, received the award of Best Goalkeeper in the 2004–05, 2006–07 and 2007–08 editions of the UEFA Champions League, and went 1,025 minutes without conceding a goal in the 2004–05 season, a league record. (Note: This record stood until 2009, when it was broken by Edwin van der Sar.) He has the third most clean sheets since 2000 among all goalkeepers.

== Club career ==
=== Early career ===
Čech started playing football aged seven for Škoda Plzeň (later known as Viktoria Plzeň). In his early days, he played as a striker, although he moved to the goalkeeper position after breaking his leg at age ten. Čech joined Czech First League team Chmel Blšany in June 1999 and made his league debut at the age of 17 in October 1999, in a 3–1 loss against Sparta.

Čech signed a five-and-a-half-year contract with Sparta Prague at the age of 18 in January 2001, although he remained at Blšany until the end of the 2000–01 season. In November 2001, Čech broke the record formerly held by Theodor Reimann for the longest time elapsed without conceding a goal in the Czech professional league, stretching his run to 855 minutes. His clean sheet record finally ended when he was beaten by a goal from Marcel Melecký of Bohemians on 17 November 2001, ending his record at 903 consecutive minutes without conceding.

Despite Čech not winning the league title in the spring of 2002 with Sparta, he attracted interest from English clubs including Arsenal due to his international performances. Due to difficulties in obtaining a work permit, however, a proposed deal with the Gunners fell through.

=== Rennes ===
In July 2002, Čech moved to French club Rennes, signing a four-year contract for a transfer fee reported as CZK150 million (€5.5 million).

During his first season in France, he was awarded man of the match in a 0–0 draw against Paris Saint-Germain by L'Équipe. In May 2003, Rennes were 17th in the league with a single match to play; they avoided relegation with a win against Montpellier in their final match.

=== Chelsea ===
Chelsea made a transfer bid for Čech in January 2004 which was rejected. However, in February Rennes agreed to Čech's move to Chelsea for £7 million. Čech signed a five-year contract, to commence in July 2004, becoming the most expensive goalkeeper in Chelsea's history at that time. Čech's was one of many British club transfers that came under the spotlight in the 2006 football corruption investigation for being potentially in breach of transfer regulations. The Stevens inquiry report, published in June 2007, found no evidence of illegal payments.

==== 2004–06: Golden Glove, back-to-back Premier League wins ====
[Cech] was quiet but when he did speak, everyone listened. Whenever the captain (John Terry) or the other leaders didn't know quite what to say, that's when he stepped up and took charge. He was one of those characters that I don't think anyone could dislike. He's humble, incredibly gifted, and works incredibly hard. You couldn't fall out with him even if you tried.

— Robert Huth, on Cech's character and leadership skills.

When Čech arrived at Chelsea, Carlo Cudicini was already established as Chelsea's first choice goalkeeper. Cudicini, however, suffered a pre-season elbow injury that allowed Chelsea manager José Mourinho to promote Čech into the starting spot, where he became the first-choice goalkeeper in his first season. He kept a clean sheet in his Premier League debut in a 1–0 victory over Manchester United. On 5 March 2005, Čech set a new Premier League record of 1,025 minutes without letting in a goal, though his record was later broken by Manchester United's Edwin van der Sar. Čech finally conceded to Leon McKenzie of Norwich City, after keeping a clean sheet in the league since 12 December 2004 when Thierry Henry scored for Arsenal. Čech was given a special award by the Premier League for the new record, and he was also awarded the Premier League Golden Glove at the end of the 2004–05 season for keeping a record 24 clean sheets in the Premier League.

Chelsea retained the Premier League title in the 2005–06 season, with Čech playing in 34 league matches. Chelsea conceded just 22 times during the season. In January 2006, he was named the IFFHS World's Best Goalkeeper for 2005. In February 2006, Čech signed a two-year contract extension, keeping him at the club until 2010. He was also named the Czech Footballer of the Year for the first time.

Čech underwent minor shoulder surgery on 27 June 2006 to repair a long-standing injury stemming from the previous season. He returned to action on 27 August 2006.

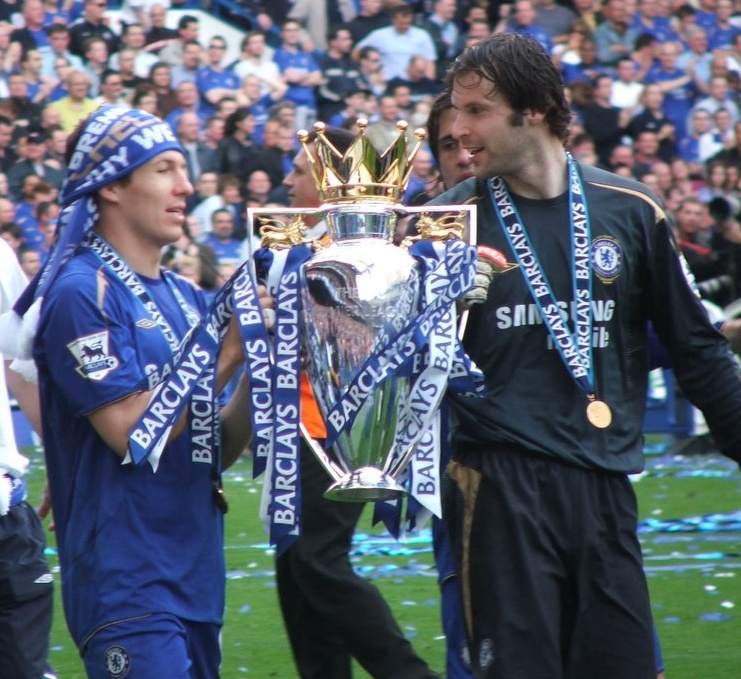
Čech and Arjen Robben celebrate their second Premier League title in 2006

==== Head injury ====
Čech sustained a head injury in the match against Reading at the Madejski Stadium on 14 October 2006 when he collided with Reading midfielder Stephen Hunt inside Chelsea's penalty area within the first minute of a Premier League match. Hunt's right knee hit Čech's head, leaving the goalkeeper requiring treatment. Čech was taken off after several minutes and replaced by Carlo Cudicini, who was knocked unconscious later in the same game, forcing Chelsea captain John Terry to play in goal for the match's remaining minutes. Čech underwent surgery for a depressed skull fracture. Initially unaware of the seriousness of the injury, the doctors later reported that it nearly cost Čech his life, and as a result of the collision, he suffered intense headaches. Chelsea went on to win the match 1–0.

Chelsea manager José Mourinho blamed Hunt for Čech's injury, saying that his challenge was "a disgrace". He also criticised the South Central Ambulance Service and match referee Mike Riley. A number of commentators, including current and former goalkeepers, saw the incident as highlighting the need for greater protection for goalkeepers.

Čech was able to return home on 24 October 2006 and participated in light training the following week. Chelsea, however, announced that the goalkeeper would be out for three months, in line with medical advice on the time needed for complete recovery from the skull fracture. In an interview, Čech said that he had no memory of the injury itself.

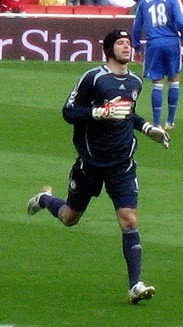
Čech playing for Chelsea in 2007

==== Return ====
Čech made his comeback in a Premier League match in a 2–0 defeat against Liverpool on 20 January 2007, wearing a rugby style headguard made by Canterbury of New Zealand and carrying the manufacturer's logo. This caused friction with Czech national team sponsor Puma and Chelsea's apparel manufacturer Adidas. The matter was resolved after the latter sponsor developed its own headgear for Čech to wear in club matches, while the player went on to wear an unbranded cap for national team games. Čech wore the headguard for the rest of his career.

Although Chelsea lost Čech's comeback match, he then went approximately 810 minutes of Premier League play without conceding a goal. On 11 April 2007, Čech was awarded the Premier League Player of the Month for the first time in his career, in recognition of his eight successive league clean sheets. He was the first goalkeeper to receive the award since Tim Flowers in 2000. This run was ended during a 4–1 Chelsea victory over West Ham United on 18 April 2007 when Carlos Tevez scored against him.

Čech also kept a clean sheet for Chelsea in the 2007 FA Cup Final against Manchester United. He and United's Edwin van der Sar shared the honour of being the first goalkeepers to keep a clean sheet over 90 minutes in a competitive fixture at the new Wembley Stadium, but Čech became the first goalkeeper to end a competitive game unbeaten, as Chelsea beat United 1–0 to win the FA Cup.

==== 2007–09: UEFA Champions League finalist, FA Cup triumph ====
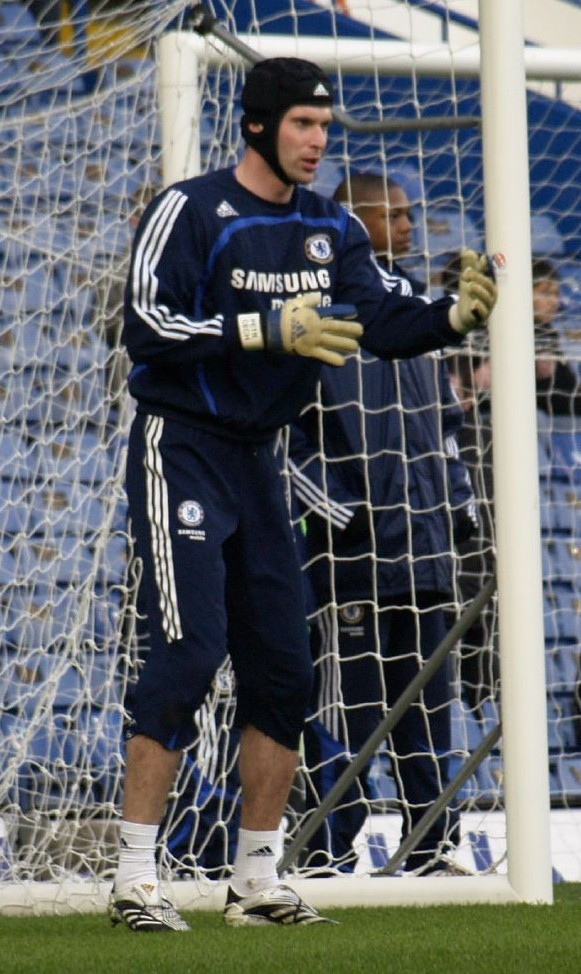
Čech training for Chelsea in 2008

Čech started the 2007–08 season conceding two goals against Birmingham City in the first match of the season. Despite this, Chelsea managed to win 3–2 and set an English record for their 64th consecutive unbeaten league match at home. In November 2007, Čech suffered an injury to his right calf muscle in the 0–0 UEFA Champions League group stage match at Schalke 04. The following month, on 23 December 2007, he had to be replaced during a match against Blackburn Rovers due to a hip injury. Chelsea suffered their first major blow when they lost the League Cup final to Tottenham Hotspur, with Čech parrying the ball onto Jonathan Woodgate's head for the winner. He played in several games until injuring his ankle in training on the eve of Chelsea's home Champions League tie with Greek champions Olympiacos. In the weeks that followed, Čech missed key games of Chelsea's campaign, including the derby with Arsenal and both legs of the Champions League quarter-final. On 7 April 2008, it was announced that Čech had undergone emergency surgery on his chin and lips following an accidental collision with Tal Ben Haim during training. He had 50 stitches put on his mouth and chin. He returned to action on 14 April, in a home match against Wigan Athletic which Chelsea drew 1–1. He appeared in the Champions League final against Manchester United, where Chelsea lost in a penalty shoot-out.

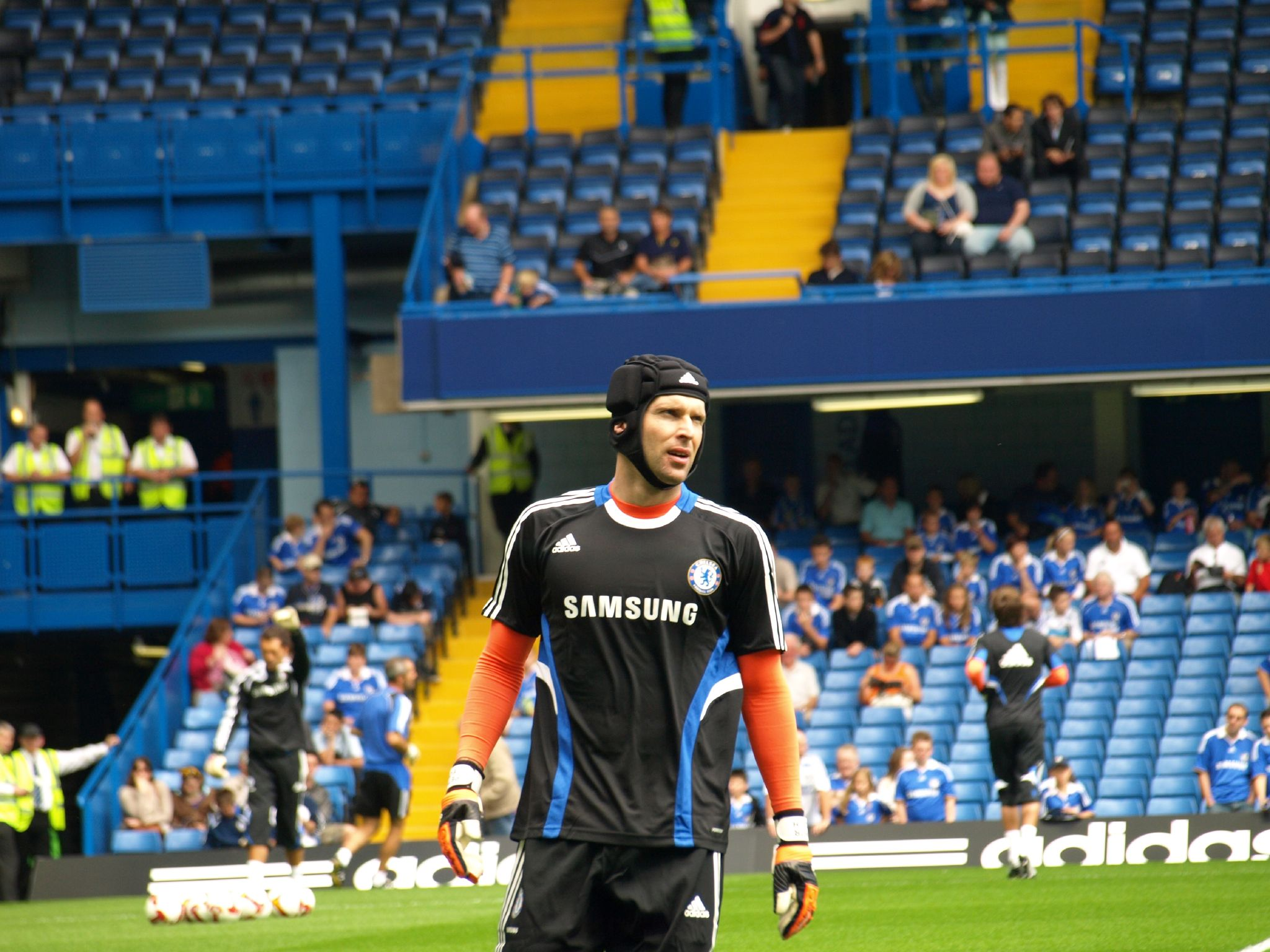
Čech before Chelsea's first game of the 2008–09 season against Portsmouth

Čech signed a new five-year contract in July 2008 to keep him at Chelsea until 2013. Chelsea started the 2008–09 season in good form, conceding only 7 goals in 17 games and keeping 11 clean sheets, 10 of which with Čech in goal.

In November 2008, Chelsea beat Sunderland 5–0 at Stamford Bridge, a game which marked the 100th match Čech had played for Chelsea without conceding a goal. Chelsea had a 1–0 victory over Juventus in the Champions League on his 200th appearance for the club, and he also starred in a 1–0 away victory at Villa Park against Aston Villa, saving from Gabriel Agbonlahor and Gareth Barry. The following week, Čech helped Chelsea move up to second place in the league by saving from Paul Scharner in the first half against Wigan Athletic at Stamford Bridge, where Chelsea won 2–1. Successive clean sheets by Čech in Chelsea's wins against Portsmouth and Coventry City saw his side consolidate their position in the Premier League whilst progressing into the FA Cup semi-finals. Čech also made saves from Dirk Kuyt and Xabi Alonso as Chelsea beat Liverpool 3–1 at Anfield in the first leg of the Champions League quarter-final.

In a crucial Premier League game in April 2009, with Chelsea comfortably leading 4–0 against Bolton Wanderers, Chelsea manager Guus Hiddink took off both Didier Drogba and Frank Lampard only for Bolton to score three late goals which questioned the Chelsea defence, and in particular Čech. Čech, however, responded when he saved a penalty from Mark Noble in Chelsea's 1–0 win at the Boleyn Ground against West Ham. He also kept a clean sheet in the next game against Barcelona during the Champions League semi-final first leg match. Following a 3–2 win against Sunderland at the Stadium of Light, Čech and Chelsea finished the season with the joint-tightest defence in the Premier League along with Manchester United, having conceded just 24 goals over the course of the season. Despite conceding the fastest goal in FA Cup final history, Čech helped Chelsea's 2009 FA Cup Final triumph over Everton. Chelsea won 2–1, earning the Czech his seventh trophy at the club.

Former Chelsea coach Luiz Felipe Scolari accused Čech, Michael Ballack and Drogba of causing his sacking, saying that they "did not accept my training methods or my demands". Scolari also said that it stemmed from a row between him and the Czech goalkeeper over the latter's alleged insistence on being given a personal coach. Čech denied the claims saying that he was "disappointed with [Scolari] because never in my life have I had a personal goalkeeping coach".

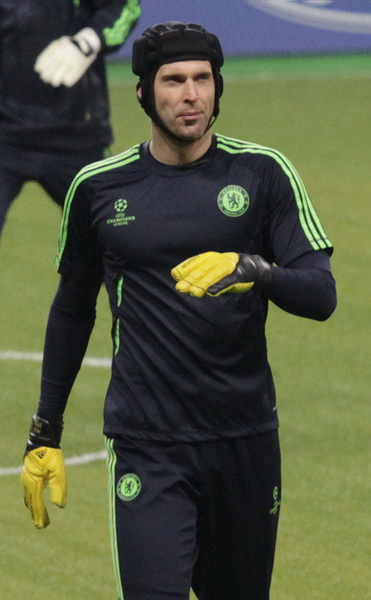
Čech training for Chelsea in 2010

==== 2009–10: Domestic double, second Golden Glove ====
Čech began the 2009–10 season in winning form with Chelsea, beating Manchester United in the Community Shield final at Wembley. With the game level at 2–2 at the end of normal time, Čech saved penalties from Ryan Giggs and Patrice Evra. Čech kept goal for Chelsea in the six-match winning run that opened their season and placed them on top of the Premier League. On 26 September 2009, however, Čech was sent off and at the same time conceded the winning penalty for a trip on Wigan forward Hugo Rodallega, in the defeat that broke the run and conceded the lead in the league to Manchester United. On 27 February 2010, Čech sustained a calf injury in the Champions League match against Inter Milan. On 13 April, Čech kept his 100th Premier League clean sheet for Chelsea, against Bolton. He won his second Premier League Golden Glove award for the season, having kept 17 clean sheets in the Premier League as Chelsea secured a third title. He concluded his season by saving a Kevin-Prince Boateng penalty against Portsmouth in the FA Cup final, ensuring that the Blues went on to retain the Cup and achieve their first domestic double.

==== 2010–13: Sustained domestic and European success ====
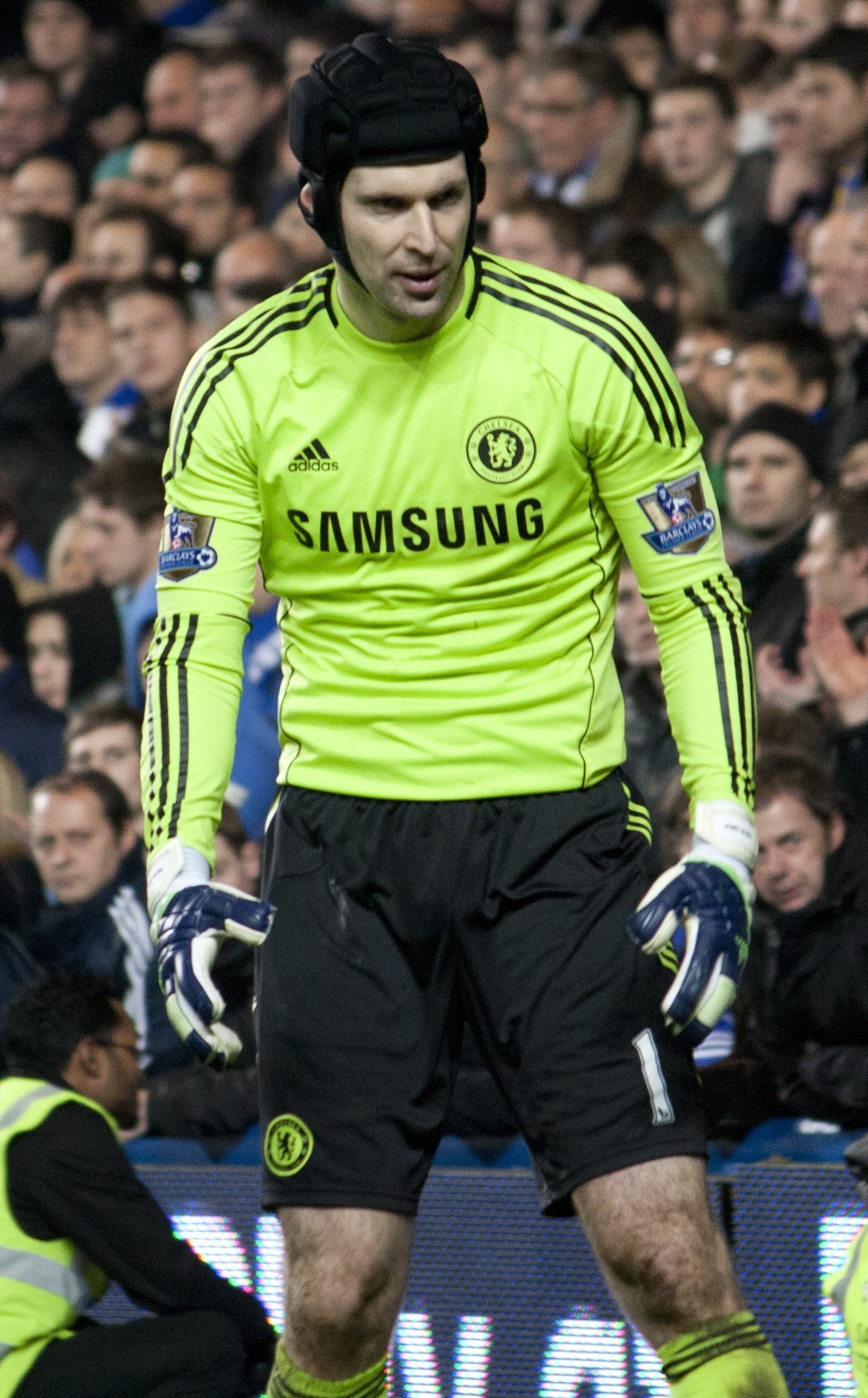
Čech playing for Chelsea in 2010

During 2010–11 pre-season training, Čech reaggravated the calf injury he suffered against Inter the previous season. Scans revealed a muscle tear that sidelined him for the next three weeks, including Chelsea's 3–1 loss to Manchester United in the Community Shield. He returned on 14 August and kept a clean sheet as Chelsea beat West Bromwich Albion 6–0. Čech then kept another clean sheet in a 2–0 win over Arsenal, before keeping a clean sheet in a 0–0 draw at Villa Park. On 7 March, Čech made his 300th Chelsea appearance, against Premier League side Blackpool, which Chelsea went on to win 3–1. On 19 May, Čech was awarded the Chelsea Player of the Year for the first time. More than 28,000 fans voted for the award, which was handed over by Chelsea manager Carlo Ancelotti.

Čech started the opening game of Chelsea's 2011–12 Premier League season away to Stoke City, which ended 0–0. On 18 August 2011, Čech was ruled out for up to four weeks after he sustained a knee injury in training. He made his return three weeks later against Sunderland in which Chelsea won 2–1. He kept a clean sheet in Chelsea's first Champions League match of the season in a 2–0 win over Bayer Leverkusen. On 27 February, Čech was announced as the Czech Footballer of the Year for 2011, winning the award for the fifth time. On 24 March, Čech played his 250th league game for Chelsea against Tottenham Hotspur in a 0–0 draw at Stamford Bridge. Čech saved a penalty in extra time against former teammate Arjen Robben, and two penalties in the subsequent penalty shoot-out, of the 2012 Champions League final against Bayern Munich resulting in the first Champions League win for Chelsea. Čech was named the Fans' Man of the Match following his heroic performance in goal for The Blues. By winning the Champions League, Čech became just the fourth Czech to win the competition. He finished the season by signing a new four-year contract with Chelsea in May, keeping him with the club until the end of the 2015–16 season.

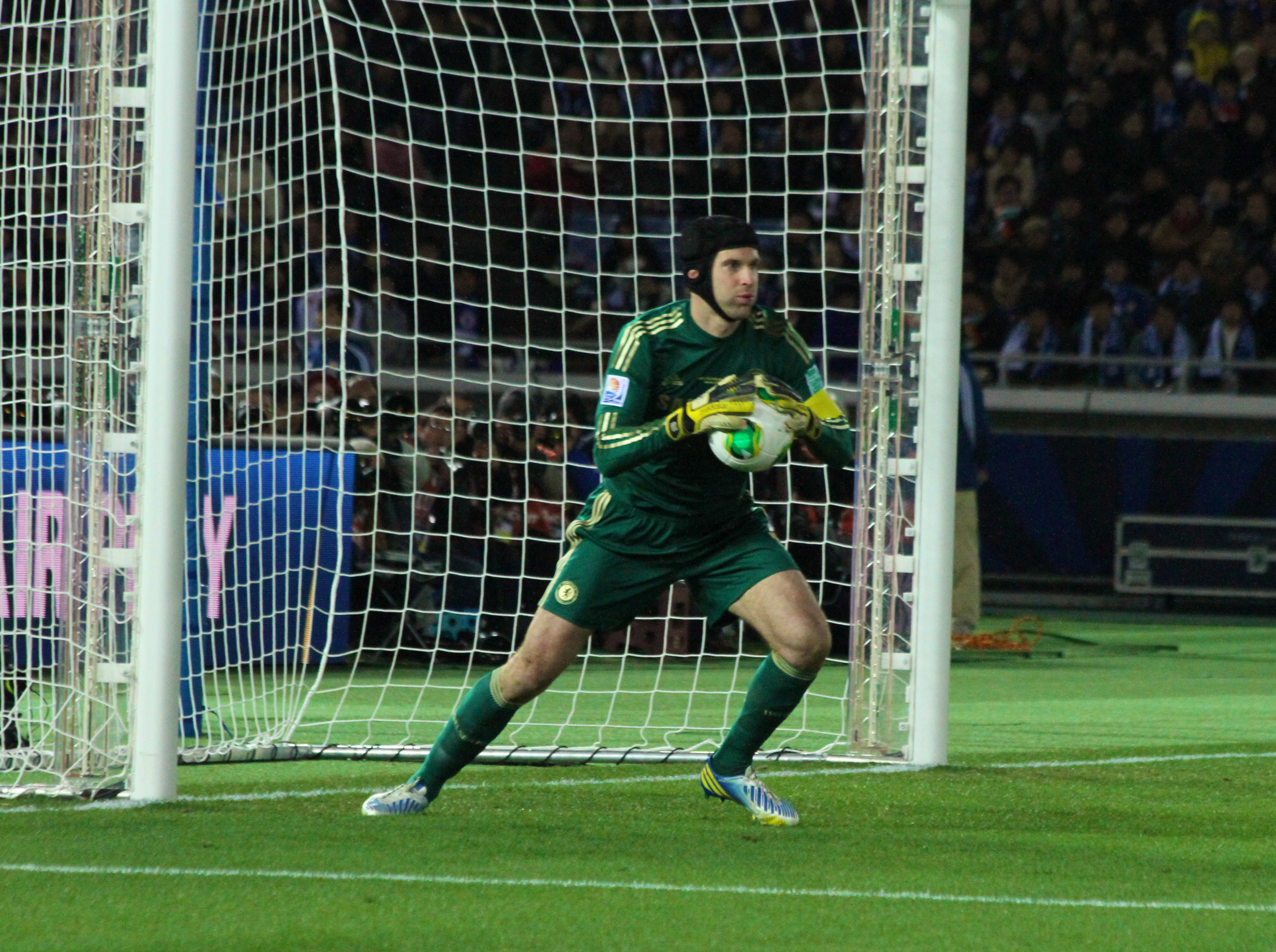
Čech playing for Chelsea in the 2012 FIFA Club World Cup

Čech started in Chelsea's first match of the 2012–13 season, the 2012 Community Shield against Manchester City, but failed to keep a clean sheet as Chelsea went down 3–2 to goals from Yaya Touré, Carlos Tevez and Samir Nasri. He also featured in the last UEFA Super Cup to be played at Monaco's Stade Louis II, in which he conceded four goals as Chelsea lost 4–1 to the UEFA Europa League winners Atlético Madrid. In October 2012, Čech took the captain's armband as regular Chelsea captain John Terry was sidelined with a four-match ban.

In May 2013, Čech won the UEFA Europa League when Chelsea defeated Benfica 2–1 in the final.

==== 2013–15: Third Golden Glove and departure ====
On 19 October 2013, Čech made his 300th Premier League appearance for Chelsea, in a 4–1 home win over newly promoted side Cardiff City. On 11 January 2014, he kept his 209th clean sheet for Chelsea in all competitions in a 2–0 away win at Hull City, beating the club record set by Peter Bonetti.

On 18 March 2014, Čech made his 100th UEFA Champions League appearance in a 2–0 win over Galatasaray at Stamford Bridge. He became the fourth goalkeeper to make a century of appearances in the competition after Iker Casillas, Víctor Valdés and Oliver Kahn.

On 22 April 2014, Čech was substituted in the first leg of the Champions League semi-final against Atlético Madrid with a shoulder injury. Chelsea manager José Mourinho stated that the injury would prevent Čech from playing again in the 2013–14 season. Despite the injury, Čech would finish the season as the joint winner of the Premier League Golden Glove award along with Arsenal goalkeeper Wojciech Szczęsny, both keeping 16 clean sheets.

Čech's place as Chelsea's starting goalkeeper was taken at the start of the season by Thibaut Courtois. This was possibly due to Čech's long standing injury concerns to his shoulder, back and knees. On 24 September 2014, Čech made his first appearance of the season against Bolton in the third round of the League Cup, a 2–1 victory. He made his first league appearance of the season on 5 October, replacing the injured Courtois in the first half of a 2–0 home win over Arsenal. His second start of the season came in the Champions League group stage victory against Slovenian side Maribor, keeping a clean sheet as Chelsea won 6–0. With Courtois injured, Čech made his first league start of the season on 13 December against Hull, keeping a clean sheet in a 2–0 win.

Despite him being second choice, Mourinho stated that Čech would not be sold in the January 2015 transfer window due to third-choice Mark Schwarzer leaving for Leicester City. During that month, Čech made back to back starts in the Premier League against Newcastle United at home, followed by Swansea City away from home, keeping clean sheets in both wins. On 1 March 2015, Čech started in goal in the 2015 Football League Cup final against Tottenham Hotspur, keeping a clean sheet in a 2–0 victory to win the trophy for the third time in his career.

=== Arsenal ===
==== 2015–16: Fourth Golden Glove, league runner-up ====
"Last summer, things changed and I understood I was no longer the first-choice keeper, but I felt it was not the right time for me to go. During the season it became clear that my situation would not improve and, as I know I am not at the stage of my career where I want to be on the bench, I made my decision to move on and look for new challenges."

— Čech, via open letter on Twitter, about his situation on Chelsea and his move to Arsenal

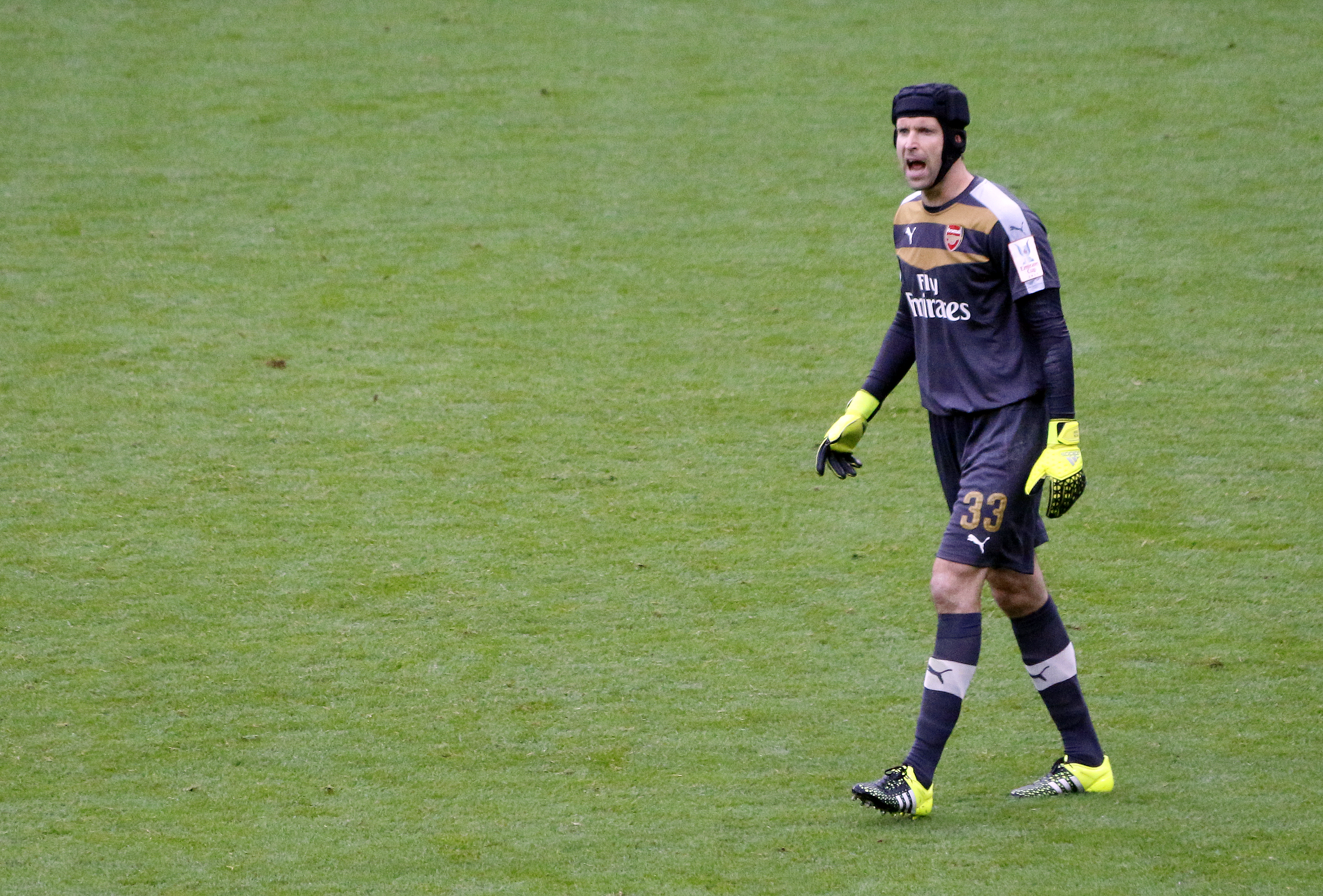
Čech playing for Arsenal at the 2015 Emirates Cup

Čech signed for Chelsea's Premier League rivals Arsenal on a four-year contract on 29 June 2015, for a fee of around £10 million. His move saw him subjected to death threats by a few Chelsea supporters. The departure of Wojciech Szczęsny to Roma on loan made Čech first-choice goalkeeper ahead of David Ospina. On 2 August, Čech won his first trophy with Arsenal after beating former side Chelsea 1–0 in the 2015 FA Community Shield. A week later, he made his Premier League debut for Arsenal in a 2–0 home defeat to West Ham. On 20 October, he made his first Champions League appearance for Arsenal in a 2–0 win against Bayern Munich.

Čech recorded his 170th Premier League clean sheet in a 2–0 win against AFC Bournemouth on 28 December 2015, setting a new league record and overtaking previous record holder David James. On 2 March 2016, he was sidelined due to a calf injury while playing against Swansea. On 2 April, he returned as an unused substitute against Watford and returned to the pitch on 17 April against Crystal Palace in a narrow 1–1 draw and guided Arsenal to its 500th Premier League win on 21 April against West Brom. Marking the end of his debut season with Arsenal, he was named the Premier League Goalkeeper of the season by critics and platforms for winning the Golden Glove with an under-performing defence.

==== 2016–17: FA Cup win ====
Čech was given the captain's armband for Arsenal in their 4–3 opening day home loss to Liverpool. In September 2016, he featured for the full 90 minutes in a 3–0 rout by Arsenal of his former side Chelsea at the Emirates. On 24 April 2017, Čech played in the 2016–17 FA Cup semi-final against Manchester City at Wembley, which Arsenal won 2–1. During this season, Cech received mild criticism among Arsenal fans for his inability to play with the ball at his feet but meanwhile he had the third most clearances among all goalkeepers in Premier League with 11 which manifested his transformation into a "sweeper keeper". Čech again held the captain's armband on 10 May 2017 in a 2–0 win over Southampton at the St Mary's Stadium. Čech was sidelined for the FA Cup Final due to injury, but Arsenal beat Chelsea 2–1. Čech won his fifth FA Cup, and Arsenal became the most successful club in the history of the competition with 13 tournament wins.

==== 2017–19: Record-breaker and retirement ====
"This was a final of farewells and absent friends and, if Hazard was its winner, Čech was its most unfortunate loser. He spent much of the final match of his glittering 20-year professional career turning around to retrieve the ball, starting dead-eyed into the row of green seats in front of him, having earlier made a sublime reflex save to deny Giroud. It was a cruel end."

— Luke Brown of Independent in review of the Europa League final.

Čech was Arsenal's starting goalkeeper in the 2017 Community Shield, against his former club Chelsea; following a 1–1 draw after regulation time, Arsenal won the match in a 4–1 penalty shoot-out, in which neither keeper saved a spot kick.

Čech then held the armband to captain Arsenal in their 4–3 opening day home win over Leicester City.

On 11 March 2018, Čech became the first Premier League goalkeeper to keep 200 league clean sheets, after a match against Watford in which he saved a penalty from Troy Deeney.

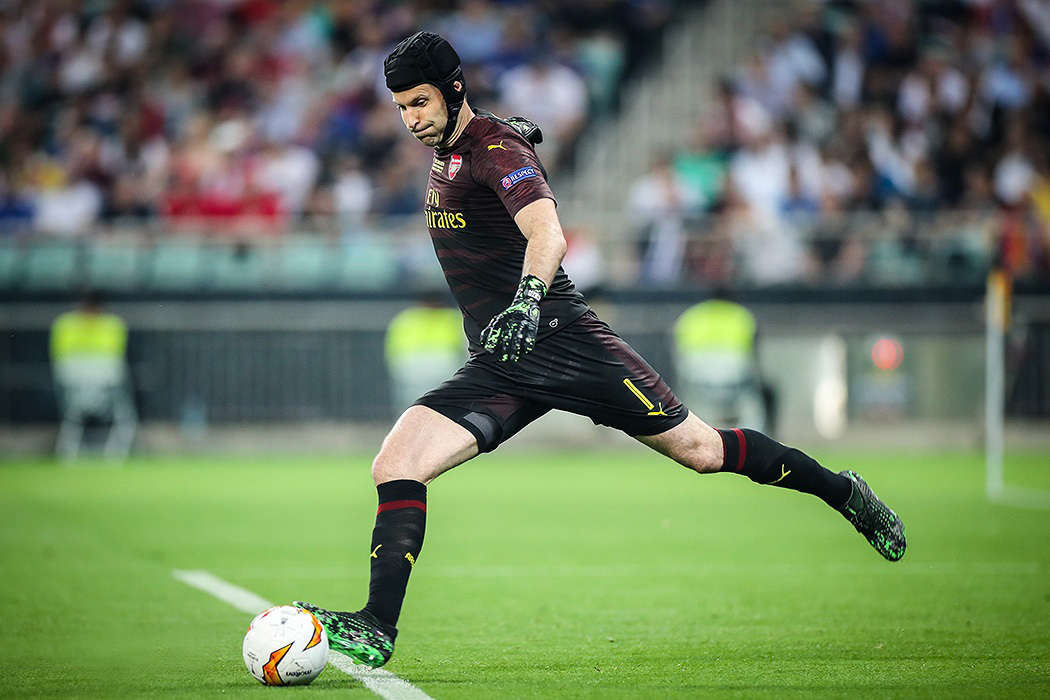
Čech during his final game as a player, the 2019 UEFA Europa League final

Čech started the 2018–19 season as the first choice in goal for new manager Unai Emery, but later lost his place to new signing Bernd Leno after suffering a hamstring injury during a match against Watford. On 15 January 2019, Čech announced via open letter on Twitter that he would retire at the end of the season. On 29 May, he made the final appearance of his career in Arsenal's 4–1 defeat to his former club Chelsea in the 2019 UEFA Europa League final. Several media outlets described him as Arsenal's Man of the Match.

== International career ==
=== Youth ===
Čech started playing for the Czech Republic at youth level. He made a combined total of 34 appearances for age groups between under-15 and under-18 between 1998 and 2000. In 2000 he moved up to the under-20 and under-21 teams, making a total of 22 appearances across those teams. Čech first came to prominence at the age of 20 at the 2002 U-21 European Championships, when he conceded only one penalty in a penalty shoot-out victory over France in the final, earning the Czech Republic their first title at youth level.

=== Senior ===
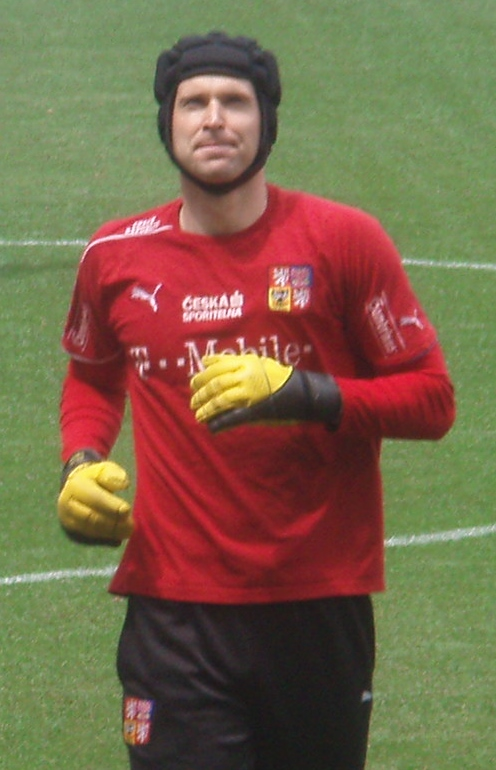
Čech playing for the Czech national football team in 2010

Čech debuted for the senior squad in February 2002 against Hungary. After establishing himself as the first choice goalkeeper, Čech was selected in the Czech Republic's squad for UEFA Euro 2004, where he was named in the all-star team as best goalkeeper at the tournament.

==== UEFA European Championships ====
On 17 October 2007, Čech captained the Czech Republic team in their Euro 2008 Group D qualifier against Germany. He kept a clean sheet and the Czechs defeated Germany 3–0 away to book their place for the finals in Austria and Switzerland. In the last group game of the final tournament, Čech was beaten three times in the final 15 minutes as Turkey overcame a two-goal deficit to knock the Czechs out. Čech had a cross slip through his hands, allowing Nihat Kahveci to score Turkey's equalising goal.

On 29 May 2012, Čech was named in the Czech Republic's squad for Euro 2012 in Poland and Ukraine. In the Czech Republic's group match against Greece, a fumble from Čech allowed the Greeks a goal. Čech deputised for the injured Tomáš Rosický as captain in the final group match against Poland, as the Czech Republic qualified for the quarter-finals with a 1–0 victory. Čech's captaincy continued in the quarter-final, where the Czechs lost to Portugal through a 79th-minute Cristiano Ronaldo goal.

==== 100th appearance and retirement ====
On 26 March 2013, Čech made his 100th appearance for the Czech Republic, keeping a clean sheet in a 3–0 win over Armenia. Čech equalled the national record of former teammate Karel Poborský on 17 November 2015, when he earned his 118th appearance in a 3–1 loss to neighbours Poland in Wrocław. The following 27 May, he took the record outright by playing in a 6–0 friendly victory over Malta.

On 8 July 2016, Čech announced his retirement from international football. He is the most capped player in the history of the Czech team, with 124 caps.

== Management career and non-contract football ==
In June 2019, Čech returned to former club Chelsea as a technical and performance advisor.

In October 2020, Čech was included in Chelsea's 25-man Premier League squad for the 2020–21 season. The club announced that Čech was included as an emergency goalkeeper and as a non-contract player, and that this was a precautionary move due to the COVID-19 pandemic. He made one appearance for Chelsea's under-23 team in the Premier League 2.

During a protest against the proposed European Super League outside Stamford Bridge on 20 April 2021, Čech approached fans who were blocking the team bus and could be heard saying "give us time". The fans did move and the team bus was able to enter after a short delay. Later that day, Chelsea were among the first clubs to withdraw from the league.

In June 2022, Čech left Chelsea after Todd Boehly took over the club.

== Ice hockey career ==
On 9 October 2019, Čech signed for ice hockey side Guildford Phoenix of the National Ice Hockey League Division 2 (level 4 of British hockey) as a goaltender. He chose to wear number 39 jersey in honour of Dominik Hašek. Čech said he would continue his role as a technical and performance advisor at Chelsea whilst playing ice hockey in his spare time. He was named the man of the match on his ice hockey debut on 13 October, after stopping two penalty shots in a shoot-out victory, and making several other crucial saves. After winning a treble with Guildford Phoenix in the 2021–22 season, Čech signed for the National Ice Hockey League Division 1 side Chelmsford Chieftains in November 2022. In June 2023, after one season with Chelmsford, he signed for fellow Division 1 side Oxford City Stars.

In the 2023 off-season, Čech played for the Elite Ice Hockey League (EIHL) defending champions, Belfast Giants, in a charity match to support the continuation of ice hockey in Ukraine (amid the Russo-Ukrainian War), raising £65,000. In November 2023, he joined the club on loan as temporary emergency cover. In an interview with the Belfast Telegraph, Čech revealed that he used to play youth ice hockey in addition to football, but equipment costs forced him to play the significantly cheaper sport of football. He also stated that ice hockey was his preferred sport as a child. Čech made his first and only appearance for the Giants during his initial loan spell in a 5–1 win over the Glasgow Clan on 25 November, playing for the final five minutes of the game in relief of starting goaltender Tyler Beskorowany, and making one save. He returned to his parent club in December before re-signing for the Giants on loan for a second time in the 2023–24 season in February 2024. In the summer of the same year, he joined the Belfast Giants for the third time on a short-term deal.

Čech did not play during the 2024–25 season. In the middle of the 2025–26 season, he signed a contract with the National Ice Hockey League Division 2 side Haringey Huskies.

== Player profile ==
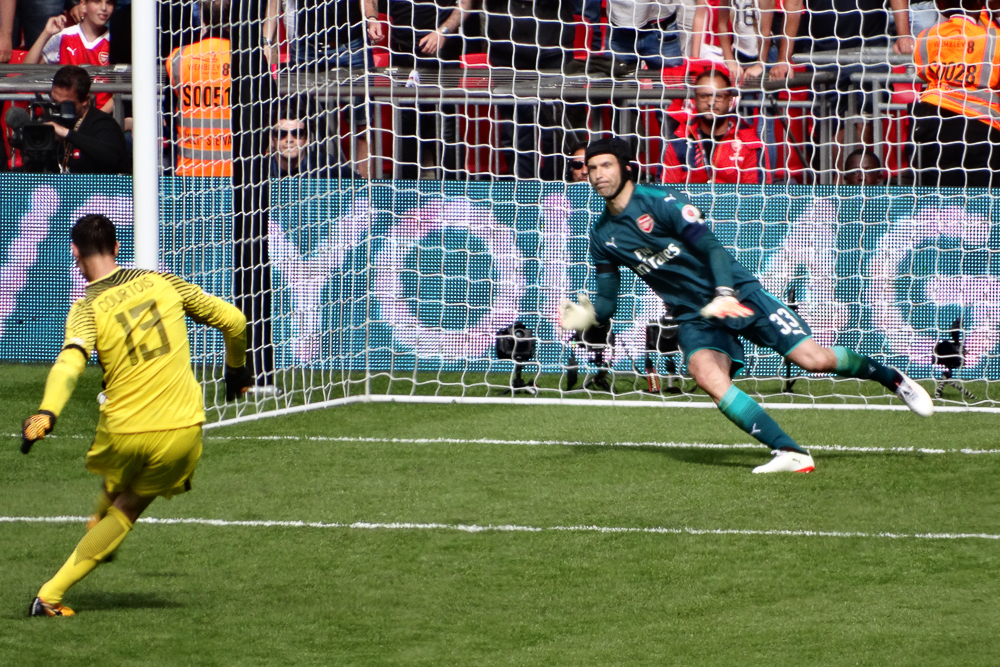
Čech diving in an attempt to save Thibaut Courtois's penalty in Arsenal's 4–1 shoot-out victory in the 2017 FA Community Shield, against his former club Chelsea

=== Style of play ===
Since emerging as a youth player, Čech has been widely considered to be one of the leading goalkeepers of his generation and one of the greatest goalkeepers of all time. Throughout his career, he was noted for his reflexes, shot-stopping abilities, positional awareness, concentration, defense organization, cross-handling abilities, and command of his penalty area. (Note: Attributed to multiple sources:)

Although Čech is not as adept with the ball at his feet as the newer generation of goalkeepers that emerged in his later career, he possesses a deep kick with either foot, despite being naturally left-footed. His ability to produce deep kicks and long throws came to use in his Chelsea days for starting quick counter-attacks which were an important part of their game. In his later career, he often functioned as a sweeper keeper, due to his ability to rush off his line, anticipate opponents who had beaten the offside trap, and clear the ball away from danger. Čech is also known for his penalty-saving abilities. Some examples of his penalty saves in high-profile matches include those made in the 2012 UEFA Champions League final, the 2010 FA Cup final, and his penalty save against Blackburn during the 2004–05 season, which helped him beat Peter Schmeichel's Premier League record of 694 minutes without conceding a goal. He cited fellow goalkeepers Oliver Kahn, Schmeichel and Edwin van der Sar as inspirations in his early career.

=== Reception ===
"I am honoured to have been the manager that, at such an early age, gave Petr a top Premier League [starting berth]. After that day, it is all about him. All about his numbers, his performances, his clean sheets, his titles and his professionalism".

— Former Chelsea manager José Mourinho on Čech.

Čech is considered to be one of the greatest goalkeepers both of his generation and of all time, as well as one of the best keepers in Premier League history, and has earned praise from several players, pundits, and managers due to his goalkeeping ability. Fellow goalkeeper Gianluigi Buffon named Čech as the best goalkeeper of his era, saying: "The best goalkeeper with his feet? Pepe Reina. In the air I'd say Neuer. With his hands: Casillas. The best overall I'd say is Čech." Iker Casillas instead described him as, "One of the best goalkeepers I have ever seen" via his Twitter account. Former Arsenal manager Arsène Wenger and goalkeeper Jens Lehmann have hailed him as "one of the greatest of all time". Journalist Alan Tyers of The Telegraph described Čech as the "Premier League's best-ever goalkeeper" in 2019.

Čech currently holds two Guinness World Records for the most clean sheets in English Premier League history, and for winning the Premier League Golden Glove Award with two different clubs. Nathan Baxter, Martin Dúbravka, Marek Rodák and João Virgínia are some of the goalkeepers who have described him as their idol. In 2011, Čech was voted the third best goalkeeper of the first decade of 21st century by IFFHS. He also has the third highest number of clean sheets (391) since 2000s among all goalkeepers. Former Premier League striker and record-goalscorer Alan Shearer named Čech in his Premier League's Team of the Decade in 2019.

== Personal life ==
Čech was born a triplet along with his sister Šárka and brother Michal in Plzeň, Czechoslovakia (present day Czech Republic). He has a weaker skull as a result of being a triplet.

Čech married Martina Dolejšová (now Čechová; born 1982), also of Czech nationality, in June 2003. They have a daughter, born in 2008, and a son Damián, born in 2009, who signed his first professional contract with Fulham in 2025. In August 2025, Čech announced that he and his wife Martina were divorcing.

He is a keen musician and plays the drums, which he picked up in 2011 after playing Guitar Hero at Carlo Cudicini's house. He has a YouTube channel under his own name on which he posts video drum covers, including Incubus' "Anna Molly", as well as songs by Coldplay and Foo Fighters. He has played with Roger Taylor of Queen. In May 2019, he and Taylor released a charity single called That's Football. In 2020, he joined folk rock band Wills & The Willing as their drummer, filming their music video "Iceberg".

Along with his native language Czech, Čech also speaks English, French, German, Italian, Portuguese and Spanish.

== Career statistics ==
=== Football ===
==== Club ====
Appearances and goals by club, season and competition
Club	Season	League			National cup (Note: Includes Czech Cup, Coupe de France, FA Cup)		League cup (Note: Includes Coupe de la Ligue, Football League Cup)		Continental		Other		Total	
Club	Season	Division	Apps	Goals	Apps	Goals	Apps	Goals	Apps	Goals	Apps	Goals	Apps	Goals
Blšany	1999–2000	Czech First League	2	0	1	0	—		—		—		3	0
Blšany	2000–01	Czech First League	25	0	0	0	—		—		—		25	0
Blšany	Total		27	0	1	0	—		—		—		28	0
Sparta Prague	2001–02	Czech First League	27	0	3	0	—		12	0	—		42	0
Rennes	2002–03	Ligue 1	37	0	4	0	0	0	—		—		41	0
Rennes	2003–04	Ligue 1	33	0	3	0	1	0	—		—		37	0
Rennes	Total		70	0	7	0	1	0	—		—		78	0
Chelsea	2004–05	Premier League	35	0	0	0	2	0	11 (Note: Appearances in UEFA Champions League)	0	—		48	0
Chelsea	2005–06	Premier League	34	0	0	0	0	0	7	0	1 (Note: Appearance in FA Community Shield)	0	42	0
Chelsea	2006–07	Premier League	20	0	6	0	2	0	8	0	0	0	36	0
Chelsea	2007–08	Premier League	26	0	1	0	3	0	9	0	1	0	40	0
Chelsea	2008–09	Premier League	35	0	6	0	1	0	12	0	—		54	0
Chelsea	2009–10	Premier League	34	0	2	0	0	0	6	0	1	0	43	0
Chelsea	2010–11	Premier League	38	0	3	0	0	0	9	0	0	0	50	0
Chelsea	2011–12	Premier League	34	0	7	0	2	0	13	0	—		56	0
Chelsea	2012–13	Premier League	36	0	5	0	3	0	15 (Note: Six appearances in UEFA Champions League, nine appearances in UEFA Europa League)	0	4 (Note: One appearance in FA Community Shield, one appearance in UEFA Super Cup, two appearances in FIFA Club World Cup)	0	63	0
Chelsea	2013–14	Premier League	34	0	1	0	0	0	10	0	1 (Note: Appearance in UEFA Super Cup)	0	46	0
Chelsea	2014–15	Premier League	7	0	2	0	4	0	3	0	—		16	0
Chelsea	Total		333	0	33	0	17	0	103	0	8	0	494	0
Arsenal	2015–16	Premier League	34	0	1	0	1	0	5	0	1	0	42	0
Arsenal	2016–17	Premier League	35	0	2	0	0	0	0	0	—		37	0
Arsenal	2017–18	Premier League	34	0	0	0	0	0	3 (Note: Appearances in UEFA Europa League)	0	1	0	38	0
Arsenal	2018–19	Premier League	7	0	2	0	2	0	11	0	—		22	0
Arsenal	Total		110	0	5	0	3	0	19	0	2	0	139	0
Career total			567	0	49	0	21	0	134	0	10	0	781	0

==== International ====
Appearances and goals by national team and year
National team	Year	Apps	Goals
Czech Republic	2002	7	0
Czech Republic	2003	8	0
Czech Republic	2004	13	0
Czech Republic	2005	10	0
Czech Republic	2006	10	0
Czech Republic	2007	8	0
Czech Republic	2008	9	0
Czech Republic	2009	7	0
Czech Republic	2010	6	0
Czech Republic	2011	10	0
Czech Republic	2012	10	0
Czech Republic	2013	8	0
Czech Republic	2014	6	0
Czech Republic	2015	6	0
Czech Republic	2016	6	0
Total		124	0

=== Ice hockey ===
As of 10 June 2024

Club	Season	League					Playoffs				Cup (Note: Includes NIHL 2 South Cup, NIHL 1 South Cup, NIHL 1 Britton Cup, and Challenge Cup)			
Club	Season	Division	GP	SO	GAA	SV%	GP	SO	GAA	SV%	GP	SO	GAA	SV%
Guildford Phoenix	2019–20	NIHL – Division 2 South (Tier 4)	6	2	?	.934	—				0	0	—	—
Guildford Phoenix	2020–21	NIHL – Division 2 South (Tier 4)	Season cancelled due to the COVID-19 pandemic											
Guildford Phoenix	2021–22	NIHL – Division 2 South (Tier 4)	12	4	1.73	.930	2	0	1.14	.955	0	0	—	—
Guildford Phoenix	Total		18	6	—		2	0	—		—			
Chelmsford Chieftains	2022–23	NIHL – Division 1 South (Tier 3)	11	0	3.89	.903	0	0	—	—	1	0	4.00	.900
Oxford City Stars	2023–24	NIHL – Division 1 South (Tier 3)	10	0	5.45	.892	—				3	0	8.00	.849
Belfast Giants (loan)	2023–24	EIHL (Tier 1)	1	0	0.00	1.000	—				0	0	—	—
Career total			40	6	—		2	0	—		4	0	—	

== Honours ==
=== Football ===
Chelsea

- Premier League: 2004–05, 2005–06, 2009–10, 2014–15
- FA Cup: 2006–07, 2008–09, 2009–10, 2011–12
- Football League Cup: 2004–05, 2006–07, 2014–15; runner-up: 2007–08
- FA Community Shield: 2005, 2009
- UEFA Champions League: 2011–12; runner-up: 2007–08
- UEFA Europa League: 2012–13
- FIFA Club World Cup runner-up: 2012

Arsenal

- FA Cup: 2016–17
- FA Community Shield: 2015, 2017
- EFL Cup runner-up: 2017–18
- UEFA Europa League runner-up: 2018–19

Czech Republic U21

- UEFA European Under-21 Championship: 2002

Individual

- UEFA European Under-21 Championship Golden Player: 2002
- Ligue 1 Gardien d'Or: 2003–04
- UEFA European Championship Team of the Tournament: 2004
- Premier League Golden Glove: 2004–05, 2009–10, 2013–14, 2015–16
- PFA Team of the Year: 2004–05 Premier League, 2013–14 Premier League
- Czech Footballer of the Year: 2005, 2008, 2009, 2010, 2011, 2012, 2013, 2015, 2016
- Golden Ball (Czech Republic): 2005, 2006, 2007, 2008, 2010, 2011, 2012, 2013, 2014, 2016, 2017, 2018
- IFFHS World's Best Goalkeeper: 2005
- Best European Goalkeeper: 2005, 2007, 2008, 2012
- UEFA Club Football Awards Best Goalkeeper: 2005, 2007, 2008
- UEFA Team of the Year: 2005
- ESM Team of the Year: 2004–05, 2005–06
- Premier League Player of the Month: March 2007
- Chelsea Player of the Year: 2011
- Premier League Hall of Fame: 2023

=== Ice hockey ===
Guildford Phoenix

- NIHL Division 2 South Regular Season: 2021–22
- NIHL Division 2 South Playoffs: 2021–22
- NIHL Division 2 South Cup: 2021–22

Individual

- NIHL 2 South Player of the Month: January 2020

=== Orders ===
- Honorary Silver Medal of Jan Masaryk: 2019

== Records ==
- Most Premier League Golden Glove awards: 4 (shared with Joe Hart)
- Most Premier League clean sheets: 202 clean sheets.
- Most Premier League clean sheets at one club: 162 with Chelsea.
- Most Premier League clean sheets in a season: 24 in 2004–05.
- First Premier League goalkeeper to reach 200 clean sheets.
- First Premier League goalkeeper to go 1000 minutes without conceding a goal.
- Fastest Premier League goalkeeper to reach 50 clean sheets: 82 appearances.
- Fastest Premier League goalkeeper to reach 100 clean sheets: 180 appearances.
- Only goalkeeper to have won the Premier League Golden Glove with different clubs.
- Most caps for Czech Republic national football team: 124 caps.
- Most Czech Footballer of the Year wins: 9 wins.
- Most Czech Republic Golden Ball wins: 11 wins.
- Most Champions League appearances by a Czech player: 111 appearances.
- Most Premier League appearances for Chelsea by a foreign player: 333 appearances.
- Most Premier League wins for Chelsea by a foreign player: 219 wins.
- Most appearances for Chelsea by a foreign player: 494 appearances.
- Most penalty saves for Chelsea by a foreign player: 8 penalty saves.
- Most starts for Chelsea in a season: 63 starts in 2012–13.
- Most major cup final appearances for Chelsea: 14 (shared with Frank Lampard).
- Most clean sheets for Chelsea: 227.
- Most clean sheets in a season for Chelsea: 28 clean sheets in 2004–05.
- Most consecutive clean sheets for Chelsea in all competitions: 7 in 2005–06 (shared record).
- Most consecutive home league clean sheets for Chelsea: 9 in 2009–10 - 2010–11 (shared record).
- Most consecutive home clean sheets for Chelsea in all competitions: 10 in 2009–10.
- Most consecutive league clean sheets for Chelsea: 10 in 2004–05.
- Most league clean sheets in a season for Chelsea: 24 in 2004–05.
- Most away league clean sheets in a season for Chelsea: 11 in 2004–05 & 2005–06.
- Most UEFA Best Club Goalkeeper Awards for a Premier League goalkeeper: 3 awards.
- One of four goalkeepers to have made consecutive appearances in the ESM Team of the Year (shared with Angelo Peruzzi, Oliver Kahn, and Manuel Neuer).

== See also ==
- List of footballers with 100 or more UEFA Champions League appearances
- List of men's footballers with 100 or more international caps
