= Marcel Melecký =

Czech footballer and manager

Personal information
- Date of birth: 17 December 1975 (age 50)
- Place of birth: Bělá, Czechoslovakia
- Height: 1.70 m (5 ft 7 in)
- Position: Midfielder

Senior career*
Years	Team	Apps	(Gls)
1995–1996	Baník Ostrava	3	(0)
1998–1999	Frýdek-Místek	29	(2)
1999–2003	Bohemians 1905	94	(6)
2004–2005	Kladno	29	(0)
2005–2008	Hlučín	68	(4)
Total		223	(12)

Managerial career
- 2017–2019: Dolní Benešov
- 2019–2020: Hlučín
- 2020–2021: Dolní Benešov
- * Club domestic league appearances and goals

Marcel Melecký (born 17 December 1975) is a Czech former football player and manager.

== Life ==
Melecký was born in Bělá.

== Club career ==
He played top-flight football for the first time with Baník Ostrava in the 1995–96 season. He went on to play football with Bohemians 1905 in the Czech First League for four more seasons, where he made 84 appearances and scored six goals. He also spent six seasons playing in the Czech 2. Liga for Frýdek-Místek, Bohemians, Kladno and Hlučín.

In November 2001, Melecký scored the goal which ended Petr Čech's record-breaking run of 903 minutes without conceding a goal. As of November 2026, it is still the longest run without conceding a goal in the Czech First League.

== Career statistics ==
Club	Season	League		Cup		Total	
Club	Season	Apps	Goals	Apps	Goals	Apps	Goals
Ostrava	1995–96	3	0	0	0	3	0
Frýdek-Místek	1998–99	29	2	0	0	29	2
Bohemians 1905	1999–2000	17	0	0	0	17	0
Bohemians 1905	2000–01	18	2	0	0	18	2
Bohemians 1905	2001–02	28	3	0	0	28	3
Bohemians 1905	2002–03	21	1	0	0	21	1
Bohemians 1905	2003–04	10	0	0	0	10	0
Bohemians 1905	Total	94	6	0	0	94	6
Kladno	2003–04	11	0	0	0	11	0
Kladno	2004–05	18	0	0	0	18	0
Kladno	Total	29	0	0	0	29	0
Hlučín	2005–06	23	0	0	0	23	0
Hlučín	2006–07	22	1	0	0	22	1
Hlučín	2007–08	23	3	0	0	23	3
Hlučín	Total	68	4	0	0	68	4
Career total		223	12	0	0	223	12
