= Ed Brand =

English football coach

Personal information
- Date of birth: 22 January 1987 (age 39)
- Place of birth: Hammersmith, London

Managerial career
- Years: Team
- 2009-2016: Chelsea Academy coach
- 2016 - 2018: Chelsea U18's Assistant
- 2018 - 2019: Chelsea U21's Assistant
- 2019 - 2023: Chelsea U18 Head Coach
- 2023: Chelsea U19 Head Coach
- 2023-24: Swindon Town Assistant Manager
- 2024: Chelsea Loan Technical Coach

Ed Brand is an English football coach who currently serves as the loan manager for Chelsea Football Club. He is a former player who came up through Chelsea's youth system, where he developed as a promising defender. His playing career was cut short due to injury. Brand also represented England at both the Under-16 and Under-17 levels. After his youth career, he spent four years in the United States, attending San Jose State University in California from 2005 to 2009 on a soccer scholarship.

== Career ==
Transitioning into coaching, Brand worked across various age groups, earning a reputation for his tactical knowledge and ability to develop young players. As the head coach of Chelsea's U18 team, he guided the youth squad through successful domestic campaigns, including being the Youth Cup runner-up and winning the U18 Premier League Cup. After being appointed youth team boss in the summer of 2019, this is a long-awaited piece of silverware for Brand. However, having been the assistant coach under Jody Morris during his time in the Academy, the former Youth Cup captain is no stranger to success at this club. Brand aimed to implement a tactical approach that emphasised possession and intense pressing. Players he coached who advanced to the senior ranks or had successful loan spells include Mason Mount, Conor Gallagher, Marc Guehi, Reece James and Lewis Hall.

In his role as assistant loan manager, Brand now oversees the development of Chelsea players loaned to clubs across Europe and beyond. He manages the relationships between Chelsea and the loan clubs, ensuring that loanees receive adequate playing time and experience.

With Alex Matos Ed Brand, was in regular contact and keeps telling him to work on his technique, particularly the neatness and threat of his passing. Matos is clearly listening as one clever turn and pass set up Jack Rudoni, whose shot went wide.

== Swindon Town ==
Brand briefly served as Swindon Town's assistant manager in early 2023, working under head coach Jody Morris. Known for his development-focused coaching style from Chelsea's Academy. Despite some successes, such as wins over teams like Bradford and AFC Wimbledon, Swindon's young squad faced challenges against more experienced opponents.
