= Bílov (Plzeň-North District) =

- Municipality
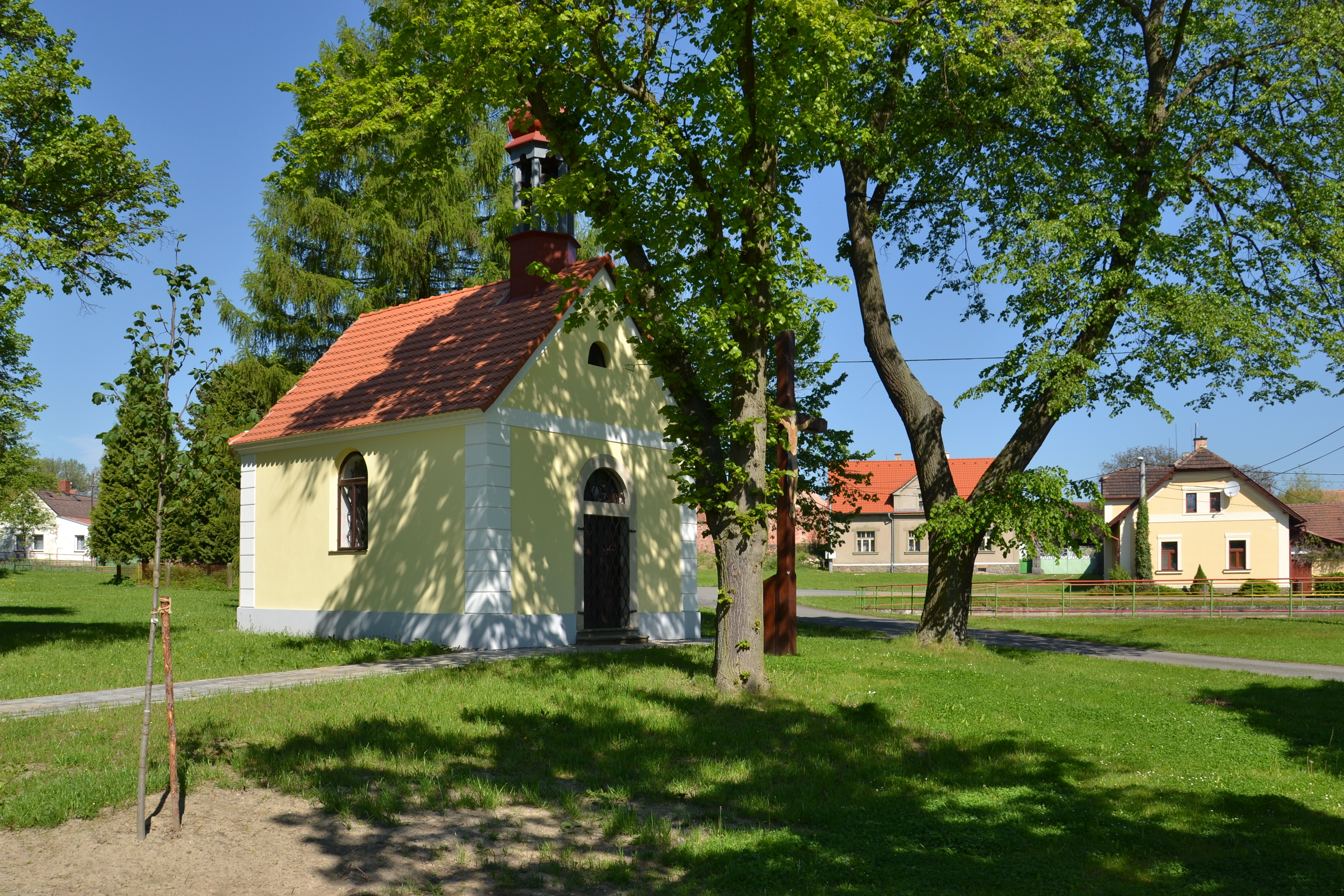
- Chapel in the centre of Bílov

- Coat of arms

- Location in the Czech Republic
- Coordinates: 50°1′5″N 13°25′30″E
- Country: Czech Republic
- Region: Plzeň
- District: Plzeň-North
- First mentioned: 1299

Area
  - Total: 6.22 km^{2} (2.40 sq mi)
- Elevation: 552 m (1,811 ft)

Population (2026-01-01)
  - Total: 83
  - Density: 13/km^{2} (35/sq mi)
- Time zone: UTC+1 (CET)
  - Summer (DST): UTC+2 (CEST)
- Postal code: 331 41
- Website: www.bilovukralovic.cz

Bílov is a municipality and village in Plzeň-North District in the Plzeň Region of the Czech Republic. It has about 80 inhabitants.

Bílov lies approximately 31 kilometres (19 mi) north of Plzeň and 72 km (45 mi) west of Prague.

== History ==
The first written mention of Bílov is from 1299, when it was owned by the monastery is Plasy. The village was probably established around 1200 and named after its probable founder, lokator Biel, whose existence was documented in 1197.

== Demographics ==
Historical population
Year	Pop.	±%
1869	248	—
1880	234	−5.6%
1890	237	+1.3%
1900	202	−14.8%
1910	213	+5.4%
1921	209	−1.9%
1930	200	−4.3%
1950	148	−26.0%
1961	137	−7.4%
1970	122	−10.9%
1980	96	−21.3%
1991	75	−21.9%
2001	81	+8.0%
2011	76	−6.2%
2021	75	−1.3%
Source: Censuses
