= Bělá (Opava District) =

- Municipality
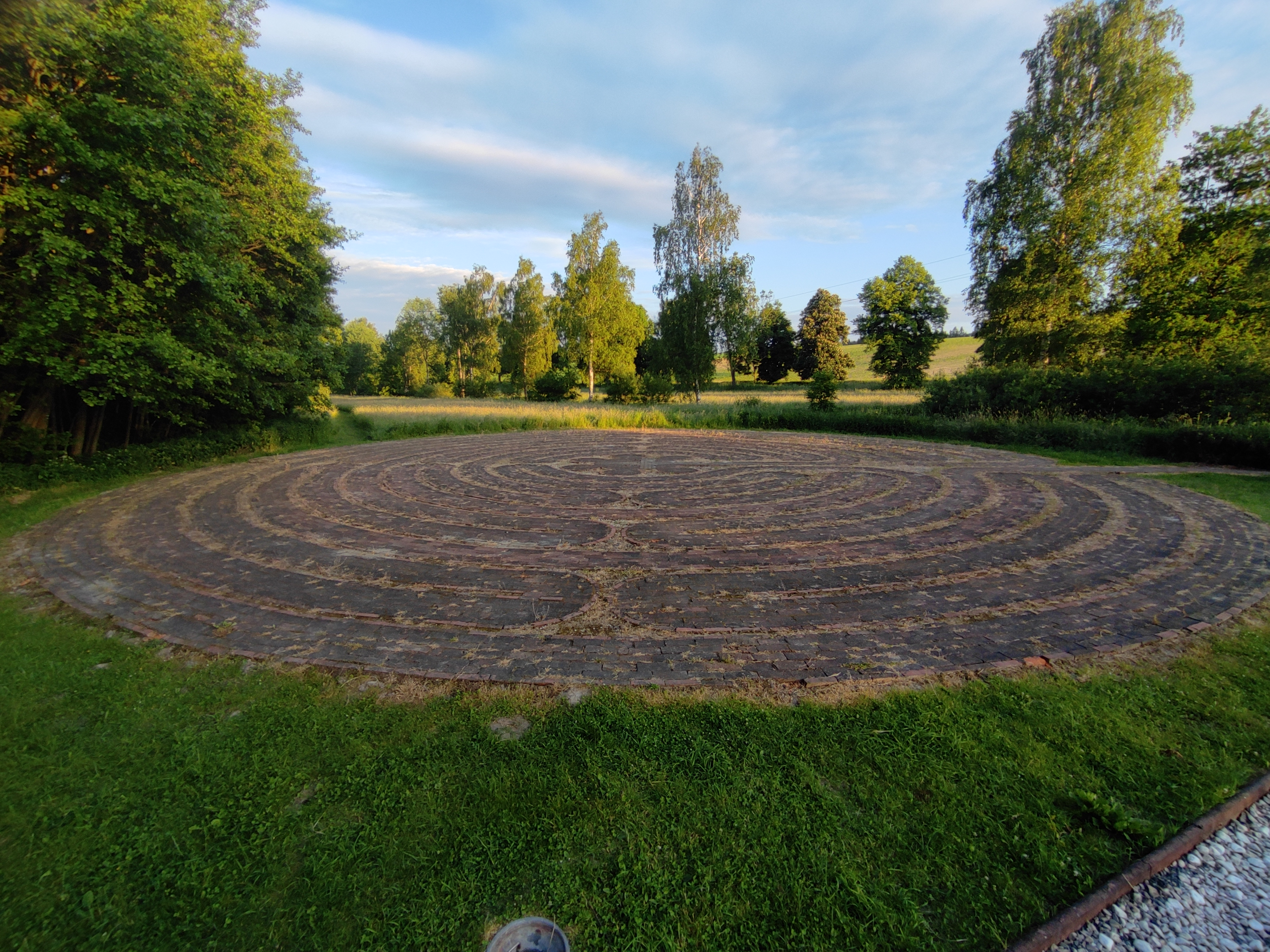
- Christian Labyrinth

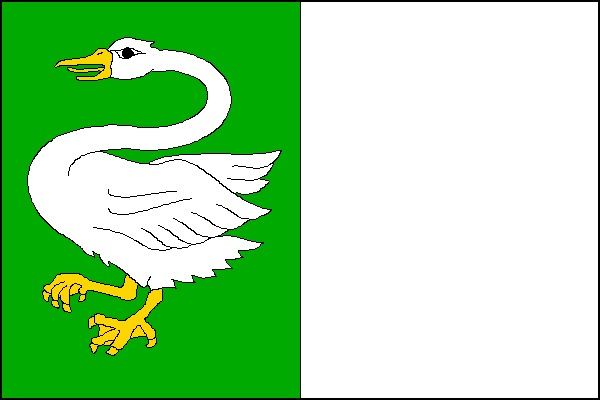
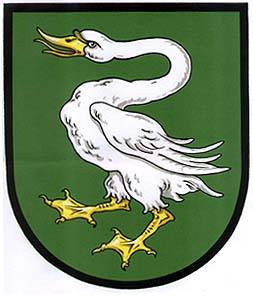
- Flag Coat of arms

- Location in the Czech Republic
- Coordinates: 49°58′20″N 18°8′42″E
- Country: Czech Republic
- Region: Moravian-Silesian
- District: Opava
- First mentioned: 1349

Area
  - Total: 2.86 km^{2} (1.10 sq mi)
- Elevation: 243 m (797 ft)

Population (2026-01-01)
  - Total: 648
  - Density: 227/km^{2} (587/sq mi)
- Time zone: UTC+1 (CET)
  - Summer (DST): UTC+2 (CEST)
- Postal code: 747 23
- Website: www.obecbela.cz

Bělá (German: Bielau, Polish: Biała) is a municipality and village in Opava District in the Moravian-Silesian Region of the Czech Republic. It has about 600 inhabitants. It is part of the historic Hlučín Region.

== History ==
The first written mention of Bělá is from 1349.

During World War II, the German occupiers operated the E116 forced labour subcamp of the Stalag VIII-B/344 prisoner-of-war camp in the village.

== Demographics ==
Historical population
Year	Pop.	±%
1869	336	—
1880	339	+0.9%
1890	366	+8.0%
1900	448	+22.4%
1910	406	−9.4%
1921	448	+10.3%
1930	476	+6.2%
1950	504	+5.9%
1961	707	+40.3%
1970	745	+5.4%
1980	768	+3.1%
1991	724	−5.7%
2001	705	−2.6%
2011	661	−6.2%
2021	646	−2.3%
Source: Censuses

== Notable people ==
- Marcel Melecký (born 1975), footballer
