= Michele Gallaccio =

Italian footballer

Personal information
- Date of birth: 3 March 1986 (age 40)
- Place of birth: Italy
- Position: Striker

Senior career*
Years	Team	Apps	(Gls)
-2005	Chelsea	0	(0)
2005-2006/07	A.C. Pisa 1909	1	(0)
2005/2006	Benevento Calcio→(loan)	3	(0)
2007-2008	Vastese Calcio 1902		
2008-2009	A.C.D. Guidonia Montecelio		
2009-2011	U.S. Palestrina 1919		
2011-2012	A.S.D. Anziolavinio		
2012/2013	A.S.D. Albalonga		
2013-2014	U.S. Palestrina 1919		
2014/2015	A.S. Bisceglie Calcio 1913		
- ASD CreCas Città di Palombara
-2018/19	ASD Valle del Tevere		
2018/19-2020	U.S. Palestrina 1919		
2020-2021	Pro Calcio Tor Sapienza		
2021-2022	Certosa		
2022-	Valmontone		
Total		4	(0)
- * Club domestic league appearances and goals

Michele Gallaccio (born 3 March 1986) is an Italian footballer.

== Career ==
At the age of 16, Gallaccio signed for Chelsea, one of the most successful teams in England, from the S.S. Lazio youth academy, where he earned 10000 pounds a month.

In 2005, Gallaccio joined A.C. Pisa 1909 in the Italian third division because he thought he would never get a chance to play with Chelsea. However, he only made one league appearance with the club.

By 2009, Gallaccio was playing in the Italian fifth division with U.S. Palestrina 1919.
