= Confluence (disambiguation) =

A confluence is the meeting of two or more bodies of water.

Confluence may also refer to:

== Science and technology ==
- Confluence (abstract rewriting), a concept in computer science
- Confluence (meteorology)
- Confluence (software), team collaboration software from Atlassian
- Confluency, a concept in cell culture biology

== Places ==
- Confluence, Kentucky, US
- Confluence, Pennsylvania, US
- La Confluence or simply Confluence, a district of the 2nd arrondissement of Lyon, France
  - Confluence (shopping mall)

== Other uses ==
- Confluence (company), an investment management software company
- Confluence (convention), an annual science fiction convention
- Confluence (sculpture), Indianapolis, Indiana, US
- "Confluence" (NCIS: New Orleans), a 2015 television episode
- Confluence: The Journal of Graduate Liberal Studies
- Confluence Project Management, consultancy firm commonly known as Confluence
- Degree Confluence Project, a web-based volunteer project

== See also ==
- Confluent hypergeometric function, a mathematical function
- Confluent, a data streaming software company
- Convergence (disambiguation)
