= 2021–22 Chelsea F.C. season =

English football club season

Chelsea
2021–22 season
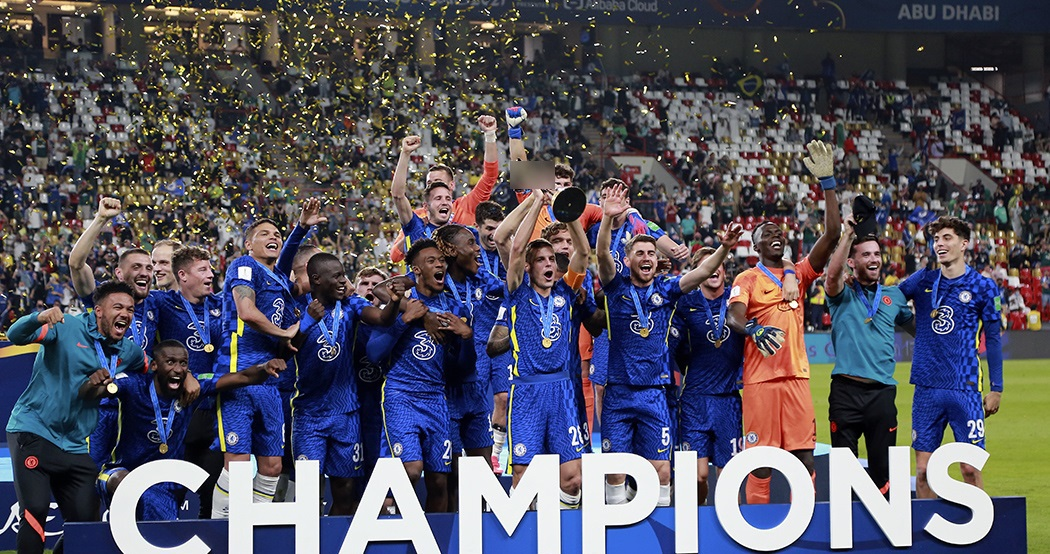
- Chelsea players celebrating the 2021 FIFA Club World Cup title
- Owner: Roman Abramovich (Until 30 May 2022); BlueCo (From 30 May 2022)
- Chairman: Bruce Buck
- Head coach: Thomas Tuchel
- Stadium: Stamford Bridge
- Premier League: 3rd
- FA Cup: Runners-up
- EFL Cup: Runners-up
- UEFA Champions League: Quarter-finals
- UEFA Super Cup: Winners
- FIFA Club World Cup: Winners
- Top goalscorer: League: Mason Mount (11); All: Romelu Lukaku (15)
- Highest home attendance: 40,113 (vs Norwich City, 23 October 2021, Premier League)
- Lowest home attendance: 31,478; (vs Leicester City, 19 May 2022, Premier League)
- Average home league attendance: 39,452
- Biggest win: 7–0 (vs Norwich City (H), 23 October 2021, Premier League)
- Biggest defeat: 1–4 (vs Brentford (H), 2 April 2022, Premier League)
Home colours	Away colours	Third colours

The 2021–22 season was Chelsea Football Club's 116th year in existence and 33rd consecutive season in the top flight of English football. In addition to the domestic league, Chelsea participated in this season's editions of the FA Cup, EFL Cup, UEFA Champions League, UEFA Super Cup and FIFA Club World Cup. The season covered the period from 1 July 2021 to 30 June 2022.

Chelsea finished the 2021–22 season with two trophies out of a possible six, winning the UEFA Super Cup and FIFA Club World Cup. The club's victory in the latter competition was significant as it not only confirmed Chelsea as World Champions for the first time, but also clinched the only outstanding piece of silverware that the club had not previously won. Upon adding the title to the club's honours, Chelsea joined an exclusive list of Ajax, Bayern Munich, Juventus and Manchester United as the five clubs that have won every single major honour in European and international football.

On the domestic front, Chelsea reached the finals of both cup competitions, defeated only on penalties by Liverpool after goalless draws on both occasions. In the Premier League, Chelsea began the season strongly and led the title race from October to early December. However, inconsistent form through December and January blunted their title challenge, with the Blues eventually finishing a distant third. In the Champions League, their title defence ended with a quarter-final elimination at the hands of eventual winners Real Madrid.

== Kits ==
Home	Home alt.	Away	Away alt.	Third	Goalkeeper 1	Goalkeeper 2	Goalkeeper 3

== Season summary ==
=== August ===
On 11 August 2021, Chelsea started off the season by beating Villarreal to win the 2021 UEFA Super Cup. Hakim Ziyech opened the scoring in the 27th minute before Gerard Moreno scored in the 73rd minute to equalise; after extra time the score remained 1–1. In the final minute of the match, Thomas Tuchel made the decision to replace goalkeeper Édouard Mendy with Kepa Arrizabalaga. Chelsea went on to win 6–5 on penalties, with Arrizabalaga making the decisive save against Raúl Albiol. Following the match, Thomas Tuchel stated: "We were well-prepared. We had a statistic that Kepa is the best in terms of saving penalties. The analysts showed me the data and then we spoke with the players [explaining] that this can happen in knockout games." It was the second time that Chelsea had won the trophy, the first win being in 1998, and the third time that the club was involved in a penalty shoot-out in the competition.

The following day, Chelsea announced that Romelu Lukaku had re-signed for the club seven years after leaving for a reported club record fee of £97.5 million. Although initial offers were turned down by Inter Milan, Chelsea's third offer for Lukaku was accepted. "I only realised that Chelsea was serious at the third offer," Lukaku stated. "It went to €110m, and I knew, this is truly serious." He continued, "If they ask me, why would I say no? Everyone knows what Chelsea means to me."

Chelsea began the Premier League season with two consecutive wins in London derbies, first at home against Crystal Palace and then at the Emirates Stadium against Arsenal. In the former, Premier League debutant Trevoh Chalobah scored the final goal in a 3–0 win with a low right-footed shot from well outside the penalty area. In the latter, new signing Romelu Lukaku scored the opening goal in a 2–0 win on his second debut for the club.

On 28 August, Chelsea travelled to Anfield to take on Liverpool in a match that was billed as an early test for two title contenders. Kai Havertz opened the scoring off a corner kick with a looping near-post header that spiraled over goalkeeper Alisson. In the first half stoppage time, Reece James was sent off after referee Anthony Taylor consulted the VAR and adjudged that James had used his arm to prevent a goal. Mohammed Salah scored the ensuing penalty despite furious protests from Chelsea players. In the second half, Chelsea defended deeply and compactly and the match finished 1–1.

On 31 August, transfer deadline day, Chelsea signed Saúl from Atlético Madrid on a season-long loan with an option to buy at the end of the season. The future fee is reported to be €40 million. Throughout the transfer window, Chelsea were linked with a move for Sevilla centre-back Jules Koundé, although it never materialized. The transfer window also saw several notable departures, including Olivier Giroud, Tammy Abraham, and Kurt Zouma. Furthermore, Chelsea sold several promising youth academy products, including Marc Guéhi, Tino Livramento, and Ike Ugbo.

Marcos Alonso was nominated for the Premier League Player of the Month award in August, which was eventually given to West Ham's Michail Antonio. Thomas Tuchel was also nominated for Premier League Manager of the Month, but it was awarded to Tottenham's Nuno Espírito Santo.

Position at the end of August
Pos	Team	Pld	W	D	L	GF	GA	GD	Pts	Qualification
2	West Ham United	3	2	1	0	10	5	+5	7	Qualification for the Champions League group stage
3	Manchester United	3	2	1	0	7	2	+5	7	Qualification for the Champions League group stage
4	Chelsea	3	2	1	0	6	1	+5	7	Qualification for the Champions League group stage
5	Liverpool	3	2	1	0	6	1	+5	7	Qualification for the Europa League group stage
6	Everton	3	2	1	0	7	3	+4	7	

=== September ===
Chelsea started September with back-to-back 3–0 wins against Aston Villa and Tottenham Hotspur in the Premier League and a 1–0 win against Zenit in the Champions League. After five matchdays in the Premier League, Chelsea and Liverpool coincidentally shared identical records, with Chelsea ahead based on the away goals head-to-head tiebreaker following their meeting on Matchday 3. On 22 September, Chelsea faced Aston Villa again in the EFL Cup, winning 4–3 on penalties after a 1–1 draw. Kepa Arrizabalaga made a decisive save against a spot kick from Marvelous Nakamba, which led him to become Chelsea's most successful goalkeeper at saving penalties during shootouts, passing Petr Čech. Both matches against Aston Villa saw debuts, first in the Premier League for Saúl and in the EFL Cup for Malang Sarr.

On 25 September, Chelsea faced off against Manchester City at Stamford Bridge. Manchester City dominated possession and employed a high press throughout the match, with Gabriel Jesus scoring the game's only goal in the 53rd minute. The 1–0 defeat was Chelsea's first loss of the season. Following the match, Thomas Tuchel stated "The performance was not complex enough. Overall, simply, we were not at our best level." It was the first time that Chelsea were beaten by Manchester City under Tuchel, with Pep Guardiola winning for the first time after three consecutive defeats in the previous season, including in the Champions League Final.

On 29 September, Chelsea suffered their first Champions League defeat of the season, losing 0–1 to Juventus in Turin. Federico Chiesa scored the game's only goal just after halftime. Although Chelsea enjoyed a majority of possession in the game, Juventus defended deeply and created several chances on the counter-attack. Chelsea ended the month of September with only three goals conceded in six matches. Chelsea's successful defensive performances led to Antonio Rüdiger being nominated for Premier League Player of the Month, though it was eventually awarded to Cristiano Ronaldo.

Position at the end of September
Pos	Team	Pld	W	D	L	GF	GA	GD	Pts	Qualification
1	Liverpool	6	4	2	0	15	4	+11	14	Qualification for the Champions League group stage
2	Manchester City	6	4	1	1	12	1	+11	13	Qualification for the Champions League group stage
3	Chelsea	6	4	1	1	12	2	+10	13	Qualification for the Champions League group stage
4	Manchester United	5	4	1	0	13	5	+8	13	Qualification for the Champions League group stage
5	Everton	6	4	1	1	12	7	+5	13	Qualification for the Europa League group stage

=== October ===
Chelsea began October with a 3–1 win against Southampton. After an early goal from Trevoh Chalobah, James Ward-Prowse equalised from the penalty spot before he was sent off in the 77th minute. Chelsea rallied to win with two late goals from Timo Werner and Ben Chilwell, who scored with a close-range left-footed volley in his first start in the Premier League during the season. On 16 October, Chelsea beat Brentford 1–0 in the first iteration of this West London derby in the modern Premier League era. Chilwell scored for the second consecutive game, while Mendy made four crucial saves to preserve a clean sheet. Chelsea played their third Champions League group stage match on 20 October against Malmö, winning 4–0. Jorginho scored two penalties and Andreas Christensen scored his first career goal for Chelsea after 137 appearances. However, both Romelu Lukaku and Timo Werner were injured during the match.

On 23 October, Chelsea beat Norwich City 7–0 in the Premier League with Mason Mount scoring his first ever senior hat-trick. The 7–0 win was the joint second-highest scoreline in Chelsea's Premier League history. Ben Chilwell scored for the fourth consecutive Premier League match, becoming the first Chelsea player to do so since Eden Hazard. Goals from Callum Hudson-Odoi and Reece James meant that 17 different players had scored for Chelsea in all competitions. On 26 October, Chelsea took on Southampton at home in the EFL Cup round of 16. Kai Havertz and Ché Adams scored the only goals of the game, with Chelsea going on to win 4–3 on penalties. Chelsea ended the month of October with a 3–0 win against Newcastle United at St. James' Park. After a goalless first half, Reece James scored two goals from the far-right corner of the penalty area, the first of which was a left-footed half-volley, ending the Premier League month of top of the league.

Chelsea ended the month of October with a 1–0 win away against Malmö, with Hakim Ziyech scoring the winner. Ben Chilwell was nominated for Premier League Player of the Month, and Thomas Tuchel was nominated for Premier League Manager of the Month for the second time, eventually going on to win the award.

Position at the end of October
Pos	Team	Pld	W	D	L	GF	GA	GD	Pts	Qualification
1	Chelsea	10	8	1	1	26	3	+23	25	Qualification for the Champions League group stage
2	Liverpool	10	6	4	0	29	8	+21	22	Qualification for the Champions League group stage
3	Manchester City	10	6	2	2	20	6	+14	20	Qualification for the Champions League group stage
4	West Ham United	10	6	2	2	20	11	+9	20	Qualification for the Champions League group stage
5	Manchester United	7	5	2	0	19	15	+4	17	Qualification for the Europa League group stage

=== November ===
November began with Trevoh Chalobah signing a contract extension through 2026. "It's quite surreal," Chalobah said. "It's a dream for me to sign a new long-term contract for my boyhood club and hopefully the dream continues. It's been an unbelievable start to the season and something I never expected but it just shows that the hard work I've put in and going out on loans has paid off."

On 6 November, Chelsea drew Burnley 1–1, with Kai Havertz scoring the opening goal before Matěj Vydra equalised. It was only the third time of the season that Chelsea dropped points in the Premier League. Entering into the international break, Chelsea were in first place in the Premier League, three points clear of second place Manchester City. Throughout the month of November, Chelsea was reported to be in negotiations with Antonio Rüdiger and Andreas Christensen over new contracts. Speaking about the negotiations, Thomas Tuchel said, "I feel the situation is calm here inside and from here we go." He went on, "You can end up in situations like this but the situations are handled from all sides very carefully, professionally and mature."

Chelsea returned from the international break on 20 November to beat Leicester City 3–0 at the King Power Stadium. N'Golo Kanté scored a long-range goal from outside of the penalty area against his former club and substitute Christian Pulisic scored after returning from a lengthy ankle injury.

On 24 November, Chelsea took on Juventus in a crucial Champions League group stage match. Heading into Matchday 5, Chelsea were second in Group H, three points behind the Italian side after losing in Turin on Matchday 2. Chelsea needed to win by a margin of two goals or more to move to the top of the group leading into the final matchday due to Juventus' superior goal difference. From the opening whistle, Chelsea employed an extremely attacking approach, with the five defenders playing an extremely high line and the forwards aggressively pressuring the ball in Juventus' half. Trevoh Chalobah scored the game's opener off a corner kick to put Chelsea 1–0 up. Five minutes later, Thiago Silva cleared a shot from former Chelsea player Álvaro Morata off the line with a dramatic overhead kick to preserve the one-goal advantage at the break. In the second half, Chelsea scored two goals in two minutes from Reece James and Callum Hudson-Odoi before Timo Werner made it 4–0 in stoppage time. The win was Chelsea's largest ever in a competitive fixture against Juventus and guaranteed their progression to the knockout rounds of the Champions League. However, Ben Chilwell suffered anterior cruciate ligament damage during the match, ruling him out for the rest of the season.

The following Sunday, Chelsea took on Manchester United, who had recently sacked manager Ole Gunnar Solskjær. Despite having almost two-thirds of the possession, Chelsea could only manage a 1–1 draw. Jorginho's heavy touch allowed Jadon Sancho to score the game's opener, but he later converted a penalty to level the score line.

Position at the end of November
Pos	Team	Pld	W	D	L	GF	GA	GD	Pts	Qualification
1	Chelsea	13	9	3	1	31	5	+26	30	Qualification for the Champions League group stage
2	Manchester City	13	9	2	2	27	7	+20	29	Qualification for the Champions League group stage
3	Liverpool	13	8	4	1	39	11	+28	28	Qualification for the Champions League group stage
4	West Ham United	13	7	2	4	24	16	+8	23	Qualification for the Champions League group stage
5	Arsenal	13	7	2	4	15	17	−2	23	Qualification for the Europa League group stage

=== December ===
Chelsea began the busy December period with a match against Watford. Players had to leave the pitch for 25 minutes due to a medical incident in the Graham Taylor Stand at Vicarage Road. Paramedics rushed onto the pitch about 12 minutes into the game to treat a supporter, who was taken to a local hospital and later reported to be in stable condition. Chelsea went on to win the game 2–1, courtesy of goals from Mason Mount and Hakim Ziyech.

Chelsea's third competitive defeat of the season came on December 4 as they travelled to the London Stadium to take on West Ham, who sat in fourth place in the Premier League. Chelsea lead twice through goals from Thiago Silva and Mason Mount, but were twice pegged back. In the 87th minute, Arthur Masuaku scored the game's winner with a cross-come-shot that beat Mendy at his near post. The result meant that Chelsea slipped to third in the Premier League, behind Manchester City and Liverpool, relinquishing the top spot for the first time since Matchday 6. Four days later, Chelsea travelled to Saint Petersburg to take on Zenit in the final Champions League group stage match. Going into the final matchday, Chelsea sat atop the group, ahead of Juventus due to their superior head-to-head record. Timo Werner scored an early goal, but by half-time, Zenit had scored twice to give the Russian side the lead. Chelsea battled back in the second half, with Romelu Lukaku equalizing before Werner scored his second in the 85th minute. However, with nearly the last kick of the game, Magomed Ozdoev made it 3–3 with a half-volley from outside the penalty area. Combined with Juventus' win against Malmö, the result meant that Chelsea would progress as runners-up in Group H.

On 11 December, Chelsea were involved in another high-scoring match as they beat Leeds United 3–2 courtesy of two penalties from Jorginho, including one in second half stoppage time. Chelsea were twice drawn against Lille in the Champions League Round of 16, as the results of the initial draw were nullified after technical issues. Five days later, Chelsea returned to action at Stamford Bridge without Timo Werner, Romelu Lukaku, and Mateo Kovačić due to COVID-19 against an injury-struck Everton. Despite almost 80% possession, Chelsea could only manage a 1–1 draw, as Mason Mount's seventh goal of the season was followed by Jarrad Branthwaite's first ever strike in the Premier League. On 22 December, Chelsea played out a scoreless draw at Molineux Stadium against Wolverhampton Wanderers before beating Brentford 2–0 in the EFL Cup quarter-final three days later. Chelsea continued to be missing several key players due to COVID-19; in the match against Brentford, Tuchel handed debuts to academy players Harvey Vale, Jude Soonsup-Bell, and Xavier Simons.

On Boxing Day, Chelsea beat Aston Villa 3–1 courtesy of two penalties from Jorginho and a goal from Romelu Lukaku on his return to the squad. Three days later, Chelsea could only manage a draw against Brighton at Stamford Bridge. Lukaku opened the scoring but Chelsea were pegged back in stoppage time as Danny Welbeck equalised. The result meant that Chelsea had failed to win consecutive home games since October. Following the match, Tuchel admitted that Chelsea's hopes of winning the Premier League title were slim, in part due to the effects of COVID-19 within the squad, stating "How should we compete in a title race? It would be stupid. I simply don't know what I can expect from my players. Nobody knows it.” Chelsea ended the calendar year in second, eight points behind league leaders Manchester City and one point ahead of Liverpool, who had a game in hand.

On 31 December, Sky Italia released an interview with Romelu Lukaku from earlier in the month in which the striker stated that he was unhappy with his lack of game time at Chelsea and eventually wished to return to former club Inter Milan. "I think the boss has decided to play a different formation but I have to stick at it and get on with it professionally" he stated. "I'm not happy with the situation but it's my job and I mustn't give up." He added, "I hope from the bottom of my heart to go back to Inter and not at the end of my career but when I'm still at a good enough level to win more trophies." In another portion of the interview, Lukaku stated "In my opinion, there are three absolute top teams in football — Real Madrid, Barcelona and Bayern Munich. Every player dreams of playing for one of these teams one day. So I thought if I ever had that possibility, I would sign a new contract with Inter and then go there...But it didn't happen, so I told myself that there is only one team where I could possibly see myself — Chelsea." The interview caused widespread anger among Chelsea fans.

Position at the end of December
Pos	Team	Pld	W	D	L	GF	GA	GD	Pts	Qualification
1	Manchester City	20	16	2	2	51	12	+39	50	Qualification for the Champions League group stage
2	Chelsea	20	12	6	2	43	14	+29	42	Qualification for the Champions League group stage
3	Liverpool	19	12	5	2	50	16	+34	41	Qualification for the Champions League group stage
4	Arsenal	19	11	2	6	32	23	+9	35	Qualification for the Champions League group stage
5	West Ham United	19	9	4	6	34	25	+9	31	Qualification for the Europa League group stage

=== January ===
Chelsea's first game of the new year came on 2 January at Stamford Bridge. The match saw second-place Chelsea take on third-placed Liverpool, with both teams needing a win to keep pace with league leaders Manchester City. In the press conferences leading up to the match, Tuchel responded to questions about Lukaku's interview by stating "I don't like it because it brings noise that we don't need. It's just not helpful. On the other side, we don't want to make more out of it than it actually is. You know very well how it is - it's very easy to take lines out of context. It's very easy to shorten lines and make headlines, then later realise that it's not so bad and maybe not what he meant." He went on, "But let's be honest that we don't like it." Tuchel announced in the pre-match press conference that he decided to drop Lukaku despite the fact that the Belgian had scored in each of the previous two league matches, stating "the thing got too noisy so close to the match, so I decided to protect the preparation of the match, and that's why he's out." Tuchel replaced Lukaku with Kai Havertz playing as a false-nine. The match started at a high pace, with chances on both ends. However, Liverpool scored twice in the opening 26 minutes. Just before halftime, Mateo Kovačić struck a volley from outside the penalty area that rifled into the top corner of the net, halving the deficit. Chelsea attacked frenetically before the interval, and in first-half stoppage time, Christian Pulisic controlled N'Golo Kanté's lofted pass and finished powerfully to level the score line at 2 goals for each side. In the second half, both Édouard Mendy and Caoimhin Kelleher made crucial saves to keep the score level. The match ended 2–2, with both sides losing ground on Manchester City.

On 3 January, Chelsea announced that Thiago Silva had extended his contract until 2023. The following day, Lukaku issued an official apology to Chelsea fans. "I am sorry for the upset I have caused," he stated. "You guys know the connection I have to the club and I totally understand you guys being upset." He went on, "I should have been much clearer in my message. The interview was about saying goodbye to the Inter fans and it wasn't about trying to disrespect the [Chelsea] fans, my teammates, the club and the manager." On 5 January, Chelsea took on Tottenham Hotspur in the League Cup semi-final first leg at Stamford Bridge, with Lukaku returning to the starting lineup. Chelsea won the match 2–0, courtesy of a goal from Kai Havertz and a Ben Davies own-goal, which occurred in bizarre fashion after Japhet Tanganga's clearance bounced back off the Welshman's face into the net. The following weekend, Chelsea beat National League side Chesterfield 5–1 in the FA Cup third round in a match that saw Lewis Hall make his senior debut. On 12 January, Chelsea beat Tottenham Hotspur 1–0 in the second leg of the Carabao Cup semi-final, booking a spot at Wembley for the final. Antonio Rüdiger, who still had not signed a contract extension, scored the game's only goal.

On 16 January, Chelsea took on league leaders Manchester City. The Citizens dominated the game for long periods, with Kevin De Bruyne scoring the game's only goal. Chelsea only managed one shot on target during the entire game, and the result saw Manchester City move 13 points clear at the top of the Premier League table. Two days later, Chelsea drew 1–1 with Brighton. The result meant that Chelsea had only won three of their last ten Premier League matches. Following the match, Tuchel spoke about Chelsea's poor league form, saying "We were mentally tired and physically tired."

Chelsea returned to winning ways on 23 January with a 2–0 win against Tottenham Hotspur in the Premier League. Hakim Ziyech opened the scoring with a curling left-footed shot from outside of the penalty area that arched into the top corner of the net. The win meant that Chelsea had beaten Tottenham three times in the space of a month—the last Premier League team to achieve this feat was Aston Villa against Blackburn Rovers in January 2010. Ziyech's goal was nominated for Premier League Goal of the Month for January, but it was awarded to Mateo Kovačić for his volley against Liverpool.

Position at the end of January
Pos	Team	Pld	W	D	L	GF	GA	GD	Pts	Qualification
1	Manchester City	23	18	3	2	55	14	+41	57	Qualification for the Champions League group stage
2	Liverpool	22	14	6	2	58	19	+39	48	Qualification for the Champions League group stage
3	Chelsea	24	13	8	3	48	18	+30	47	Qualification for the Champions League group stage
4	Manchester United	22	11	5	6	37	31	+6	38	Qualification for the Champions League group stage
5	West Ham United	23	11	4	8	41	31	+10	37	Qualification for the Europa League group stage

=== February ===
Chelsea began February with a 2–1 win after extra time against Plymouth Argyle in the FA Cup fourth round in a match led by assistant coach Arno Michels due to Tuchel's positive COVID-19 test. Marcos Alonso scored the match-winning goal in extra time and Kepa Arrizabalaga saved a late penalty to avoid a shootout. Chelsea then travelled to the United Arab Emirates for the 2021 Club World Cup. Chelsea faced Saudi side Al-Hilal in the semi-finals at the Mohammed bin Zayed Stadium in Abu Dhabi in a match they won 1–0 courtesy of a goal from Romelu Lukaku. In the final, Chelsea played Brazilian side Palmeiras who beat Al Ahly in the semi-finals. It was a tight contest, but Lukaku opened the scoring just after the second half began. However, Palmeiras equalised just nine minutes later from the penalty spot after Thiago Silva was penalised for a handball, sending the match into extra time. The score remained level until the 117th minute, when Chelsea were also awarded a penalty for a handball. César Azpilicueta picked up the ball and appeared to be set to take the decisive penalty, but after being mobbed by Palmeiras players, he passed it to Kai Havertz, who scored. After the match, Azpilicueta stated that "it was a tactic because I knew how they are, I knew they were coming for the penalty taker, so I took the ball." Chelsea won the match 2–1, winning the Club World Cup for the first time in their history, thus making them the second English side after Liverpool to win the international treble of the UEFA Champions League, UEFA Super Cup and FIFA Club World Cup. Thiago Silva was named the tournament's best player, and Chelsea won the Fair Play Award.

Chelsea returned to Premier League action on 19 February beating Crystal Palace 1–0 at Selhurst Park after Hakim Ziyech scored an 89th-minute winner. Three days later, Chelsea hosted their Champions League Round of 16 tie against Lille, winning 2–0 after goals from Kai Havertz, who replaced Lukaku in the starting lineup, and Christian Pulisic. On 26 February, Chelsea released a club statement in which owner Roman Abramovich announced that we was "giving trustees of Chelsea's charitable Foundation the stewardship and care of Chelsea FC." The move came two days after the 2022 Russian invasion of Ukraine and suggestions that the UK government should seize Abramovich's assets for his role in the Russian state.

On 27 February, Chelsea played Liverpool in the 2022 EFL Cup Final. The match was played at a quick pace, with both teams creating a number of high-quality chances. Mason Mount and Christian Pulisic both had opportunities to score in the first half, while Édouard Mendy made a series of important saves including one at point-blank range against Sadio Mané. The match went to extra time after Joel Matip's close-range finish was ruled out for a foul. Chelsea also put the ball in the back of the net three times, but all were ruled offside. The final of these goals saw a Romelu Lukaku goal narrowly ruled out for offside, with the Belgian forward's bicep being used to determine the line for offside. Despite many opportunities, neither team could break the deadlock after 120 minutes, so the match went to a penalty shootout. Thomas Tuchel substituted goalkeeper Édouard Mendy for Kepa Arrizabalaga, as he had done in the Super Cup. Chelsea shot second, and after ten rounds of shots every player had scored leaving the two goalkeepers to shoot. Liverpool goalkeeper Caoimhin Kelleher dispatched his penalty before Arrizabalaga shot over the crossbar, meaning that Liverpool won the Carabao Cup 11–10 on penalties. It was the longest shootout in EFL Cup Final history. After the game, Trevoh Chalobah openly criticised referee Stuart Attwell for failing to penalise a challenge from Naby Keïta which required stitches.

Position at the end of February
Pos	Team	Pld	W	D	L	GF	GA	GD	Pts	Qualification
1	Manchester City	27	21	3	3	64	17	+47	66	Qualification for the Champions League group stage
2	Liverpool (T)	26	18	6	2	70	20	+50	60	Qualification for the Champions League group stage
3	Chelsea	25	14	8	3	49	18	+31	50	Qualification for the Champions League group stage
4	Manchester United	27	13	8	6	45	35	+10	47	Qualification for the Champions League group stage
5	West Ham United	27	13	6	8	46	34	+12	45	Qualification for the Europa League group stage

(T) Qualified, but not yet for the particular phase indicated

=== March ===
On 2 March, just hours before Chelsea took on Luton Town in the FA Cup fifth round, Roman Abramovich announced that he planned to sell the football club, stating "I have always taken decisions with the Club's best interest at heart. In the current situation, I have therefore taken the decision to sell the Club, as I believe this is in the best interest of the Club, the fans, the employees, as well as the Club's sponsors and partners." He also stated his intent to donate all proceeds of the sale to the victims of the war in Ukraine. Chelsea went on to beat Luton Town 3–2 with goals from Saúl, Timo Werner, and Romelu Lukaku. In the following days, numerous reports about interested buyers surfaced including Swiss billionaire Hansjörg Wyss, Los Angeles Dodgers and Lakers shareholder Todd Boehly, Pakistani businessman Javed Afridi, and other unnamed parties. On 9 March, it was reported that Abramovich had received multiple bids but none matched the £3 billion valuation. However, on 10 March, the British government froze all of Roman Abramovich's assets due to his close personal ties with Vladimir Putin, leaving Chelsea unable to sell tickets or merchandise, buy or sell players, and negotiate contracts. The UK government issued Chelsea a license that allowed the club to continue footballing activities, ensuring employees continued to be paid, and that season-ticket holders could continue to attend games. Subsequently, Three UK and Hyundai announced that they were terminating their sponsorship partnerships with Chelsea, which reportedly totaled up to £50 million per year. Sponsor Trivago and kit maker Nike, however, maintained their existing deals with the club. On 12 March, Chelsea's company credit cards were frozen, significantly limiting day-to-day spending but still allowing for matchday transportation costs lower than 20,000 per game. It was reported that this left Chelsea unable to buy fuel for the team's bus. Technical director Petr Čech stated, "We have many questions, we don't have many answers but we are determined to concentrate on things we can control" and noted that the club was running "day-to-day."

Meanwhile, Chelsea continued to fulfil their regular season matches, beating Norwich 3–1 away at Carrow Road and beating Burnley 4–0 at Turf Moor, headlined by a strike from Reece James that was nominated as March Premier League goal of the month. The Blues also won 1–0 against Newcastle at Stamford Bridge with a last minute winner from Kai Havertz that was also nominated for Premier League goal of the month. Prior to their trip to Lille for the second leg of the Champions League Round of 16, Thomas Tuchel noted that there were doubts about whether the team would be able to travel, stating "My last information is we are getting a plane. So we can go by plane and come back by plane. If not, we'll go by train. If not, we'll go by bus. If not, I'll drive a seven-seater. Honestly, I will do it. You can mark my words, I will do to arrive there." He went on, "of course, organization-wise, there are some negotiations going on and talks, but it doesn't influence me. That's what I mean, we have brilliant guys who organize the travel and we have, in every department, such committed people that at the moment things feel pretty normal."

Chelsea's off-the-pitch turmoil continued in the build-up to the FA Cup quarter-final against Middlesbrough, when the UK government rejected Chelsea's request to sell additional away tickets. As a result, Chelsea lodged a request to play the match behind closed doors, which was subsequently withdrawn after an official rebuke from Middlesbrough. Chelsea went on to win the match 2–0 after goals from Romelu Lukaku and Hakim Ziyech.

The deadline for new ownership groups to submit applications was set on March 18 by Raine Group, an American bank overseeing the process of Chelsea's sale. In the following week, The Raine Group narrowed a shortlist to four bidders, eliminating bids led by Nick Candy, Woody Johnson, Saudi Media Group, Aethel Partners, and Centricus. The remaining bidders included groups led by the Ricketts family, Todd Boehly, Sir Martin Broughton, and Stephen Pagliuca. However, Islamophobic comments from Joe Ricketts surfaced on social media, which led many Chelsea fans to demand that the Ricketts family bid be removed from consideration. Chelsea Supporters' Trust released a statement on March 25 stating "our concerns about their [the Ricketts family] ability to run an inclusive, successful club on behalf of our diverse supporter base around the world have not been allayed."

Despite off-the-pitch turmoil, Trevoh Chalobah and Kai Havertz were nominated for the Premier League player of the month for March and Thomas Tuchel was nominated as Premier League manager of the month.

Position at the end of March
Pos	Team	Pld	W	D	L	GF	GA	GD	Pts	Qualification
1	Manchester City	29	22	4	3	68	18	+50	70	Qualification for the Champions League group stage
2	Liverpool (T)	29	21	6	2	75	20	+55	69	Qualification for the Champions League group stage
3	Chelsea	28	17	8	3	57	19	+38	59	Qualification for the Champions League group stage
4	Arsenal	28	17	3	8	45	32	+13	54	Qualification for the Champions League group stage
5	Tottenham Hotspur	29	16	3	10	45	34	+11	51	Qualification for the Europa League group stage

(T) Qualified, but not yet for the particular phase indicated

=== April ===
Chelsea began the month of April with a 4–1 defeat at home to Brentford. Antonio Rüdiger opened the scoring in the 48th minute with a strike from 35 yards that was nominated for April's Premier League Goal of the Month award. However, Brentford rallied with three goals in ten minutes before scoring a fourth just before the full-time whistle. It was the first time that Brentford had won at Stamford Bridge since 1939. On 6 April, Chelsea took on Real Madrid in the first leg of the Champions League quarter-final at home. Karim Benzema scored two headers three minutes apart in the first half, putting Chelsea at an early disadvantage. However, Kai Havertz pulled a goal back just before half time to halve the deficit. Just after the break, Benzema completed his hat-trick after he picked off a loose pass by Édouard Mendy. Despite chances late in the match from substitute Romelu Lukaku, Chelsea went on to lose the match 3–1. Before the second leg, Chelsea travelled to St. Mary's Stadium to take on Southampton, where they won 6–0 courtesy of braces from Timo Werner and Mason Mount and goals from Kai Havertz and Marcos Alonso. The result was Chelsea's second largest win of the season. On 12 April, Chelsea travelled to the Santiago Bernabéu to take on Real Madrid. The match began with a high intensity from both sides, but it was Chelsea who scored first with a goal from Mason Mount in the 15th minute. Six minutes after half time, Antonio Rüdiger doubled Chelsea's lead with a powerful header off a corner kick, levelling the score on aggregate at 3–3. Chelsea then had a Marcos Alonso goal disallowed by VAR after he was adjudged to have handled the ball, but in the 75th minute, Timo Werner scored to make it 3–0 on the night and 4–3 on aggregate after dribbling past two Real Madrid defenders and calmly scoring past Thibaut Courtois. However, in the 80th minute, Real Madrid levelled on aggregate after Luka Modrić picked out Rodrygo. The match went on to extra time, where both sides had chances. However, the final goal of the match was scored by Karim Benzema, who capitalized on a series of defensive errors. The match ended in a 3–2 victory for Chelsea but a 5–4 defeat on aggregate. Following the match, Thomas Tuchel stated "Yes, it always [hurts to lose] but these are the kinds of defeats we can digest, because we left no regrets out there. We played how we wanted to play, we showed the quality and the character that this team has. We deserved to go through. It was not meant to be today, we were simply unlucky."

On 15 April, it was announced that the Ricketts group had withdrawn their bid to takeover Chelsea, stating "The Ricketts-Griffin-Gilbert Group has decided, after careful consideration, not to submit a final bid for Chelsea FC. In the process of finalising their proposal, it became increasingly clear that certain issues could not be addressed given the unusual dynamics around the sales process. We have great admiration for Chelsea and its fans, and we wish the new owners well."

Chelsea returned to winning ways against Crystal Palace in a 2–0 victory at Wembley in the FA Cup semi-final to book a spot in the final against Liverpool. They returned to Premier League action with a 4–2 defeat to Arsenal at home on 20 April, with several defensive errors proving costly as the Gunners won at Stamford Bridge for the second consecutive season. The result meant that Chelsea had conceded 11 goals in their last 3 home matches in all competitions, making it their leakiest home defense record in three matches since 1989. On 24 April, Chelsea beat West Ham 1–0 with a 90th-minute winner from Christian Pulisic and ended April four days later with a 1–1 draw against Manchester United, in which Cristiano Ronaldo equalized two minutes after Marcos Alonso opened the scoring. During this period, it was widely reported that Antonio Rüdiger had agreed to join Real Madrid when his contract expired in the summer and would be leaving the club at the end of the season.

Position at the end of April
Pos	Team	Pld	W	D	L	GF	GA	GD	Pts	Qualification
1	Manchester City (Q)	34	26	5	3	84	21	+63	83	Qualification for the Champions League group stage
2	Liverpool (Q)	34	25	7	2	86	22	+64	82	Qualification for the Champions League group stage
3	Chelsea	33	19	9	5	68	28	+40	66	Qualification for the Champions League group stage
4	Arsenal	33	19	3	11	53	41	+12	60	Qualification for the Champions League group stage
5	Tottenham Hotspur	33	18	4	11	54	36	+18	58	Qualification for the Europa League group stage

(Q) Qualified for the phase indicated

=== May ===
Chelsea began the month of May with a 1–0 defeat to relegation-threatened Everton at Goodison Park, who were managed by former head coach and club legend Frank Lampard. On 4 May, it was reported that the sale of Chelsea was being stalled because Roman Abramovich wanted to restructure the sale to regain the £1.5 billion he had loaned to the club. One day later, however, Chelsea released an official statement clarifying that these reports were false and that all proceeds from the club's sale would be donated to charitable foundations. It was also reported that Sir Jim Ratcliffe submitted a late bid worth £4.25 billion to buy Chelsea but was rejected out of hand. The sale of Chelsea officially proceeded on 6 May, as an ownership group led by Todd Boehly, Clearlake Capital, Mark Walter, and Hansjörg Wyss acquired the club. The first match of the new era came on 7 May in a home match against Wolves. Chelsea led 2–0 after Romelu Lukaku scored a brace, but were pegged back as Wolves scored twice in the final 20 minutes of the match to level the score at 2–2. The result left Chelsea just one point ahead of Arsenal in fourth. Marcos Alonso was substituted from the match at half time, and it was reported that this was due to an altercation with Thomas Tuchel, who stated "Marcos was not injured, it was just a decision we made." It was rumored that Marcos Alonso wanted to push for a move to Barcelona in the summer and that teammates César Azpilicueta and Andreas Christensen could also move to Camp Nou on a free, as their contracts were set to expire in the summer.

Chelsea won for the first time in May by beating relegation-threatened Leeds 3–0 midweek before the FA Cup Final against Liverpool. The final took place on 14 May 2022 at Wembley and was a repeat of the Carabao Cup Final earlier in the season. Chelsea lined up in their away yellow uninform, possibly due to a superstitious belief that it would give them a better chance of winning. Liverpool dominated early proceedings, but Chelsea were able to keep the Reds at bay with Édouard Mendy called into action on several occasions. However, Chelsea grew into the game over the course of the first half, and Christian Pulisic and Marcos Alonso both had chances to score. In the second half, both sides continued to have chances, with Alonso hitting the crossbar and both Luis Díaz and Andrew Robertson hitting the post. The match finished scoreless at the end of ninety minutes, leading to an extra time which was bereft of major chances. Like the Carabao Cup Final, the match finished 0–0 and went to penalties. César Azpilicueta hit the post with an early penalty giving Liverpool the advantage. With the fifth kick of the shootout, Sadio Mané stepped up with a chance to score the decisive penalty but saw his shot saved by Mendy. However, in the seventh round of spot kicks, Alisson saved Mason Mount's penalty, and Kostas Tsimikas scored, winning the FA Cup Final for Liverpool. It was the second time of the season that Liverpool had beaten Chelsea in a cup final on penalties and was the third consecutive season in which Chelsea lost in the FA Cup Final.

Following the disappointment in the Cup Final, Chelsea were boosted by the fact that Arsenal lost back-to-back matches against Tottenham and Newcastle, guaranteeing them a top four finish and a spot in the 2022–23 UEFA Champions League. Chelsea then drew Leicester City 1–1 in their penultimate match of the season, which all but secured third place for the Blues due to their far superior goal difference to Tottenham. On the final day of the season, Chelsea beat Watford 2–1 after Ross Barkley scored a stoppage time winner, confirming their third-place finish with 74 points, 19 points behind champions Manchester City. Chelsea broke a new Premier League record by becoming the first side in the history of the competition not to be losing a match at half-time within a season.

On 28 May, the club announced that a "final and definitive agreement" was entered to sell the club to the consortium of Boehly and Clearlake Capital. On 30 May, the club announced that the acquisition of the club to the said consortium had been completed. The sale of the club was approved by the UK and Portuguese Governments, the European Union and Premier League. Several players also officially announced their departures from Chelsea, including Danny Drinkwater and Antonio Rüdiger.

==== Final league position ====
Pos	Team	Pld	W	D	L	GF	GA	GD	Pts	Qualification or relegation
1	Manchester City (C)	38	29	6	3	99	26	+73	93	Qualification for the Champions League group stage
2	Liverpool	38	28	8	2	94	26	+68	92	Qualification for the Champions League group stage
3	Chelsea	38	21	11	6	76	33	+43	74	Qualification for the Champions League group stage
4	Tottenham Hotspur	38	22	5	11	69	40	+29	71	Qualification for the Champions League group stage
5	Arsenal	38	22	3	13	61	48	+13	69	Qualification for the Europa League group stage (Note: Since the winners of the 2021–22 FA Cup and the 2021–22 EFL Cup, Liverpool, qualified for the Champions League, the spot given to the FA Cup winners (Europa League group stage) was passed to the sixth-placed team and the spot given to the League Cup winners (Europa Conference League play-off round) was passed to the seventh-placed team.)

Source: Premier League
Rules for classification: 1) Points; 2) Goal difference; 3) Goals scored; 4) If the champions, relegated teams or qualified teams for UEFA competitions cannot be determined by rules 1 to 3, rules 4.1 to 4.3 are applied – 4.1) Points gained in head-to-head record between such teams; 4.2) Away goals scored in head-to-head record between such teams; 4.3) Play-offs
(C) Champions

== Management team ==
Position	Name
Head coach	(Germany) Thomas Tuchel
Assistant head coach	(Germany) Arno Michels
Assistant coaches	(Hungary) Zsolt Lőw
Assistant coaches	(England) Anthony Barry
Goalkeeper coach	(Portugal) Henrique Hilário

== Players ==
=== Squad information ===
Players and squad numbers last updated on 22 May 2022. Appearances include all competitions.
Note: Flags indicate national team as has been defined under FIFA eligibility rules. Players may hold more than one non-FIFA nationality.

No.	Player	Nat.	Position(s)	Date of birth (age)	Signed in	Contract ends	Signed from	Transfer fee	Apps.	Goals
Goalkeepers
1	Kepa Arrizabalaga	(Spain)	GK	3 October 1994 (aged 27)	2018	2025	(Spain) Athletic Bilbao	£71.5M	124	0
13	Marcus Bettinelli	(England)	GK	24 May 1992 (aged 30)	2021	2023	(England) Fulham	Free	1	0
16	Édouard Mendy	(Senegal)	GK	1 March 1992 (aged 30)	2020	2025	(France) Rennes	£22M	93	0
Defenders
2	Antonio Rüdiger	(Germany)	CB	3 March 1993 (aged 29)	2017	2022	(Italy) Roma	£29M	203	12
3	Marcos Alonso	(Spain)	LWB / LB	28 December 1990 (aged 31)	2016	2023	(Italy) Fiorentina	£24M	212	29
4	Andreas Christensen	(Denmark)	CB	10 April 1996 (aged 26)	2013	2022	(England) Chelsea Academy	N/A	161	2
6	Thiago Silva	(Brazil)	CB	22 September 1984 (aged 37)	2020	2023	(France) Paris Saint-Germain	Free	82	5
14	Trevoh Chalobah	(England)	CB / DM	5 July 1999 (aged 22)	2018	2026	(England) Chelsea Academy	N/A	30	4
21	Ben Chilwell	(England)	LB / LWB	21 December 1996 (aged 25)	2020	2025	(England) Leicester City	£45M	55	7
24	Reece James	(England)	RB / RWB	8 December 1999 (aged 22)	2018	2025	(England) Chelsea Academy	N/A	123	9
28	César Azpilicueta (captain)	(Spain)	RB / CB	29 August 1989 (aged 32)	2012	2022	(France) Marseille	£7M	476	17
31	Malang Sarr	(France)	CB / LB	23 January 1999 (aged 23)	2020	2025	(France) Nice	Free	21	0
Midfielders
5	Jorginho (vice-captain)	(Italy)	DM / CM	20 December 1991 (aged 30)	2018	2023	(Italy) Napoli	£50M	188	26
7	N'Golo Kanté	(France)	CM / DM	21 March 1991 (aged 31)	2016	2023	(England) Leicester City	£32M	260	13
8	Mateo Kovačić	(Croatia)	CM / DM	6 May 1994 (aged 28)	2019	2024	(Spain) Real Madrid	£40M	184	4
12	Ruben Loftus-Cheek	(England)	CM / DM	23 January 1996 (aged 26)	2014	2024	(England) Chelsea Academy	N/A	122	13
17	Saúl	(Spain)	CM / DM	21 November 1994 (aged 27)	2021	2022	(Spain) Atlético Madrid	£4.5M^{a}	26	1
18	Ross Barkley	(England)	AM / CM	5 December 1993 (aged 28)	2018	2023	(England) Everton	£15M	100	12
23	Kenedy	(Brazil)	LM / LWB	8 February 1996 (aged 26)	2015	2023	(Brazil) Fluminense	£6.3M	30	3
68	Harvey Vale	(England)	AM / CM	11 September 2003 (aged 18)	2021	2023	(England) Chelsea Academy	N/A	5	0
Forwards
9	Romelu Lukaku	(Belgium)	ST	13 May 1993 (aged 29)	2021	2026	(Italy) Inter Milan	£97.5M	59	15
10	Christian Pulisic	(United States)	LW / RW	18 September 1998 (aged 23)	2019	2024	(Germany) Borussia Dortmund	£58M	115	25
11	Timo Werner	(Germany)	ST / LW	6 March 1996 (aged 26)	2020	2025	(Germany) RB Leipzig	£47.5M	89	23
19	Mason Mount	(England)	AM / CM / LW / RW	10 January 1999 (aged 23)	2017	2024	(England) Chelsea Academy	N/A	160	30
20	Callum Hudson-Odoi	(England)	LW / RWB	7 November 2000 (aged 21)	2018	2024	(England) Chelsea Academy	N/A	126	16
22	Hakim Ziyech	(Morocco)	RW / AM	19 March 1993 (aged 29)	2020	2025	(Netherlands) Ajax	£37M	83	14
29	Kai Havertz	(Germany)	CF / AM	11 June 1999 (aged 23)	2020	2025	(Germany) Bayer Leverkusen	£72M	92	23

a. Loan fee with the option to buy at the end of season.

== Transfers ==
=== In ===
==== Summer ====
Date	No.	Pos.	Player	From	Fee	Source
1 July 2021	55	FW	(England) Jayden Wareham	(England) Woking	Free	
28 July 2021	13	GK	(England) Marcus Bettinelli	(England) Fulham	Free	
12 August 2021	9	FW	(Belgium) Romelu Lukaku	(Italy) Inter Milan	£97,500,000	
10 September 2021		MF	(England) Bradley Ryan	(England) Welling United	Free	

==== Winter ====
Date	No.	Pos.	Player	From	Fee	Source
10 January 2022		DF	(England) Travis Akomeah	(England) Watford	Free	
22 January 2022		DF	(England) Dylan Williams	(England) Derby County	Undisclosed	
31 January 2022		FW	(England) Mason Burstow	(England) Charlton Athletic	Undisclosed	

=== Loan in ===
==== Summer ====
Date	No.	Pos.	Player	From	Fee	Source
31 August 2021	17	MF	(Spain) Saúl	(Spain) Atlético Madrid	£4,500,000	

=== Out ===
==== Summer ====
Date	No.	Pos.	Player	To	Fee	Source
9 June 2021	48	DF	(France) Pierre Ekwah-Elimby	(England) West Ham United	£1,260,000	
16 June 2021		MF	(Serbia) Danilo Pantić	(Serbia) Partizan	Free	
18 June 2021		MF	(Netherlands) Marco van Ginkel	(Netherlands) PSV	Free	
1 July 2021		GK	(England) Jamal Blackman	(United States) Los Angeles FC (Note: Released on 1 July 2021, Blackman joined Los Angeles FC on 13 September 2021)	Free	
1 July 2021	13	GK	(Argentina) Willy Caballero	(England) Southampton (Note: Released on 1 July 2021, Caballero joined Southampton on 6 December 2021)	Free	
1 July 2021		DF	(England) Filip Lissah	(Wales) Swansea City	Free	
1 July 2021		DF	(England) Zane Myers	(Wales) Swansea City	Free	
1 July 2021		DF	(England) David Roberts	(Wales) Swansea City	Free	
1 July 2021	14	DF	(England) Fikayo Tomori	(Italy) Milan	£26,800,000	
1 July 2021		DF	(England) Jack Wakely	(England) Wycombe Wanderers (Note: Released on 1 July 2021, Wakely joined Wycombe Wanderers on 28 July 2021)	Free	
1 July 2021	63	DF	(England) Charlie Wiggett	(England) Newcastle United	Undisclosed	
1 July 2021		MF	(England) Dubem Eze	(England) Derby County	Free	
1 July 2021	51	MF	(England) Marcel Lewis	(Belgium) Union SG	Free	
1 July 2021		MF	(England) Finley Munroe	(England) Aston Villa	Free	
1 July 2021		FW	(England) Izzy Brown	(England) Preston North End	Free	
1 July 2021		FW	(England) Kyrell Wilson	(Wales) Swansea City	Free	
2 July 2021	41	MF	(England) Luke McCormick	(England) AFC Wimbledon	Free	
2 July 2021		FW	(Nigeria) Victor Moses	(Russia) Spartak Moscow	£4,500,000	
17 July 2021	18	FW	(France) Olivier Giroud	(Italy) Milan	£900,000	
18 July 2021		DF	(England) Marc Guéhi	(England) Crystal Palace	£21,000,000	
19 July 2021		MF	(England) Jon Russell	(England) Huddersfield Town	Free	
22 July 2021	54	MF	(England) Lewis Bate	(England) Leeds United	£1,580,000	
23 July 2021	58	MF	(England) Myles Peart-Harris	(England) Brentford	£1,350,000	
27 July 2021	46	DF	(England) Dynel Simeu	(England) Southampton	£1,580,000	
29 July 2021		FW	(Finland) Aleksi Heino	(Germany) VfL Wolfsburg	Undisclosed	
3 August 2021	57	MF	(England) Tino Livramento	(England) Southampton	£5,310,000	
17 August 2021	9	FW	(England) Tammy Abraham	(Italy) Roma	£36,000,000	
24 August 2021		DF	(Italy) Davide Zappacosta	(Italy) Atalanta	£8,100,000	
25 August 2021		FW	(Canada) Ike Ugbo	(Belgium) Genk	£3,150,000	
28 August 2021	15	DF	(France) Kurt Zouma	(England) West Ham United	£31,500,000	
28 August 2021	56	MF	(England) Declan Frith	(England) Aston Villa (Note: Released at the end of August 2021, Frith joined Aston Villa on 13 October 2021)	Free	
7 December 2021	83	MF	(England) Bradley Ryan	(England) Ramsgate	Free	

==== Winter ====
Date	No.	Pos.	Player	To	Fee	Source
15 January 2022	32	MF	(England) Lewis Baker	(England) Stoke City	Undisclosed	
28 January 2022	38	MF	(England) Tariq Uwakwe	(England) Crewe Alexandra	Undisclosed	

=== Loan out ===
==== Summer ====
Date	Until	No.	Pos.	Player	To	Fee	Source
1 July 2021	End of season	56	DF	(England) Levi Colwill	(England) Huddersfield Town	Free	
1 July 2021	End of season		GK	(England) Nathan Baxter	(England) Hull City	Free	
2 July 2021	End of season	23	MF	(Scotland) Billy Gilmour	(England) Norwich City	Free	
6 July 2021	21 January 2022 (Note: On 21 January, Castillo was recalled to facilitate a loan move to Charlton Athletic.)		DF	(Netherlands) Juan Castillo	(England) Birmingham City	Free	
26 July 2021	End of season	47	DF	(England) Henry Lawrence	(England) AFC Wimbledon	Free	
26 July 2021	13 January 2022 (Note: On 13 January, Cumming's was recalled early from his loan at Gillingham to facilitate a loan move to MK Dons.)		GK	(England) Jamie Cumming	(England) Gillingham	Free	
30 July 2021	End of season		DF	(Netherlands) Ian Maatsen	(England) Coventry City	Free	
30 July 2021	End of season		MF	(England) Conor Gallagher	(England) Crystal Palace	Free	
10 August 2021	End of season		FW	(Albania) Armando Broja	(England) Southampton	Free	
13 August 2021	End of season		DF	(England) Jake Clarke-Salter	(England) Coventry City	Free	
18 August 2021	End of season		FW	(Belgium) Michy Batshuayi	(Turkey) Beşiktaş	£135,000	
18 August 2021	13 January 2022 (Note: On 13 January, Kenedy was recalled early from his loan at Flamengo.)		MF	(Brazil) Kenedy	(Brazil) Flamengo	£450,000	
18 August 2021	End of season	40	GK	(Croatia) Karlo Žiger	(Slovenia) Rudar Velenje	Free	
19 August 2021	End of season	33	DF	(Italy) Emerson	(France) Lyon	£450,000	
20 August 2021	End of season		DF	(United States) Matt Miazga	(Spain) Alavés	Free	
27 August 2021	End of season		DF	(Ghana) Baba Rahman	(England) Reading	Free	
30 August 2021	30 June 2023		MF	(France) Tiémoué Bakayoko	(Italy) Milan	£1,800,000	
30 August 2021	End of season		MF	(England) Danny Drinkwater	(England) Reading	Free	
31 August 2021	End of season		DF	(England) Dujon Sterling	(England) Blackpool	Free	
31 August 2021	5 January 2022 (Note: On 5 January, Ballo was recalled early from his loan at Rapid Vienna.)	42	MF	(Austria) Thierno Ballo	(Austria) Rapid Vienna	Free	
31 August 2021	End of season	44	DF	(Wales) Ethan Ampadu	(Italy) Venezia	Free	
2 September 2021	30 January 2022 (Note: On 30 January, Anjorin was recalled to facilitate a loan move to Huddersfield Town.)	27	MF	(England) Tino Anjorin	(Russia) Lokomotiv Moscow	Free	

==== Winter ====
Date	Until	No.	Pos.	Player	To	Fee	Source
13 January 2022	End of season		GK	(England) Jamie Cumming	(England) Milton Keynes Dons	Free	
21 January 2022	End of season		DF	(Netherlands) Juan Castillo	(England) Charlton Athletic	Free	
31 January 2022	End of season		MF	(England) Tino Anjorin	(England) Huddersfield Town	Free	
31 January 2022	End of season		FW	(England) Mason Burstow	(England) Charlton Athletic	Free	
1 February 2022	End of season	50	GK	(United States) Ethan Wady	(England) Hendon	Free	
1 February 2022	End of season	80	GK	(Algeria) Sami Tlemcani	(England) Merstham	Free	
2 March 2022	26 August 2022 (Note: On 26 August, Fiabema was recalled early from his loan at Rosenborg.)	49	FW	(Norway) Bryan Fiabema	(Norway) Rosenborg	Free	

=== Overall transfer activity ===
==== Expenditure ====
Summer: ▼£102,000,000

Winter: ▼£0

Total: ▼£102,000,000

==== Income ====
Summer: ▲£143,030,000

Winter: ▲£0

Total: ▲£143,030,000

==== Net totals ====
Summer: ▲£41,030,000

Winter: £0

Total: ▲£41,030,000

== Pre-season and friendlies ==
On July 14, Chelsea announced they would visit Championship side Bournemouth on 27 July for a pre-season friendly. Prior to this, they would face Peterborough United in a behind-closed-doors friendly at their Cobham Training Centre.

Win Draw Loss Fixtures

17 July 2021	Chelsea	6–1	Peterborough United	Cobham, Surrey
11:00 BST	Abraham 15'; Pulisic 20' (pen.); Ziyech 24' 29' 63'; Broja 90+1'	Report	Dembélé 56' (pen.)	Stadium: Cobham Training Centre; Attendance: 0

27 July 2021	Bournemouth	1–2	Chelsea	Kings Park
19:45 BST	Marcondes 66'	Report	Broja 71'; Ugbo 76'	Stadium: Vitality Stadium

15 August 2021	Chelsea	13–0	Weymouth	Cobham, Surrey
12:30 BST	Hudson-Odoi 1' 20'; Batshuayi 9' 13' 26' 48' 52'; Barkley 34' 54' 75'; Emerson 44'; Thiago Silva 64'; James 89'	Report		Stadium: Cobham Training Centre; Attendance: 0

=== Mind Series ===
The Blues were confirmed to take part in a first-of-its-kind Mind Series to support mental health in August 2021.

1 August 2021	Arsenal	1–2	Chelsea	Highbury
15:00 BST	Xhaka 69'; Tavares (yellow card) 86'	Report	Havertz 26'; Kovačić (yellow card) 42'; Zappacosta (yellow card) 54'; Abraham 72'	Stadium: Emirates Stadium; Attendance: 20,000; Referee: Andre Marriner

4 August 2021	Chelsea	2–2	Tottenham Hotspur	Fulham
19:45 BST	Ziyech 16', 49'	Report	Lucas 56'; Bergwijn 70'	Stadium: Stamford Bridge; Referee: Keith Stroud

== Competitions ==
=== Overall record ===
Competition	First match	Last match	Starting round	Final position	Record							
Competition	First match	Last match	Starting round	Final position	Pld	W	D	L	GF	GA	GD	Win %
Premier League	14 August 2021	21 May 2022	Matchday 1	3rd	38	21	11	6	76	33	+43	55.26
FA Cup	8 January 2022	14 May 2022	Third round	Runners-up	6	5	1	0	14	4	+10	83.33
EFL Cup	22 September 2021	27 February 2022	Third round	Runners-up	6	3	3	0	7	2	+5	50.00
UEFA Champions League	14 September 2021	12 April 2022	Group stage	Quarter-finals	10	7	1	2	21	10	+11	70.00
UEFA Super Cup	11 August 2021		Final	Winners	1	0	1	0	1	1	+0	0.00
FIFA Club World Cup	9 February 2022	12 February 2022	Semi-final	Winners	2	2	0	0	3	1	+2	100.00
Total					63	38	17	8	122	51	+71	60.32

Source: Soccerway

=== Premier League ===
==== League table ====
Pos	Team	Pld	W	D	L	GF	GA	GD	Pts	Qualification or relegation
1	Manchester City (C)	38	29	6	3	99	26	+73	93	Qualification for the Champions League group stage
2	Liverpool	38	28	8	2	94	26	+68	92	Qualification for the Champions League group stage
3	Chelsea	38	21	11	6	76	33	+43	74	Qualification for the Champions League group stage
4	Tottenham Hotspur	38	22	5	11	69	40	+29	71	Qualification for the Champions League group stage
5	Arsenal	38	22	3	13	61	48	+13	69	Qualification for the Europa League group stage (Note: Since the winners of the 2021–22 FA Cup and the 2021–22 EFL Cup, Liverpool, qualified for the Champions League, the spot given to the FA Cup winners (Europa League group stage) was passed to the sixth-placed team and the spot given to the League Cup winners (Europa Conference League play-off round) was passed to the seventh-placed team.)

Source: Premier League
Rules for classification: 1) Points; 2) Goal difference; 3) Goals scored; 4) If the champions, relegated teams or qualified teams for UEFA competitions cannot be determined by rules 1 to 3, rules 4.1 to 4.3 are applied – 4.1) Points gained in head-to-head record between such teams; 4.2) Away goals scored in head-to-head record between such teams; 4.3) Play-offs
(C) Champions

==== Results summary ====
Overall								Home						Away					
Pld	W	D	L	GF	GA	GD	Pts	W	D	L	GF	GA	GD	W	D	L	GF	GA	GD
38	21	11	6	76	33	+43	74	9	7	3	37	22	+15	12	4	3	39	11	+28

Source: Premier League

==== Results by matchday ====
Game Week	1	2	3	4	5	6	7	8	9	10	11	12	13	14	15	16	17	18	19	20	21	22	23	24	25	26	27	28	29	30	31	32	33	34	35	36	37	38
Ground	H	A	A	H	A	H	H	A	H	A	H	A	H	A	A	H	H	A	A	H	H	A	H	A (Note: Match 24 was played before match 23 as a result of Chelsea's involvement in the delayed 2021 FIFA Club World Cup.)	H	A	A	H	H	A	H	H	A	A	H	A	H	H
Result	W	W	D	W	W	L	W	W	W	W	D	W	D	W	L	W	D	D	W	D	D	L	D	W	W	W	W	W	L	W	L	W	D	L	D	W	D	W
Position	2	2	4	2	1	3	1	1	1	1	1	1	1	1	3	3	3	3	3	2	2	3	3	3	3	3	3	3	3	3	3	3	3	3	3	3	3	3

Source: Premier League
A = Away; H = Home; W = Win; D = Draw; L = Loss; P = Postponed
Notes: Positions show the situation at the end of the corresponding Game Weeks (GW); not the position at the conclusion of matches or game days

==== Score overview ====
Win Draw Loss

Opposition	Home score	Away score	Aggregate score	Double
Arsenal	2–4	2–0	4–4	No
Aston Villa	3–0	3–1	6–1	Yes
Brentford	1–4	1–0	2–4	No
Brighton	1–1	1–1	2–2	No
Burnley	1–1	4–0	5–1	No
Crystal Palace	3–0	1–0	4–0	Yes
Everton	1–1	0–1	1–2	No
Leeds United	3–2	3–0	6–2	Yes
Leicester City	1–1	3–1	4–2	No
Liverpool	2–2	1–1	3–3	No
Manchester City	0–1	0–1	0–2	No
Manchester United	1–1	1–1	2–2	No
Newcastle United	1–0	3–0	4–0	Yes
Norwich City	7–0	3–1	10–1	Yes
Southampton	3–1	6–0	9–1	Yes
Tottenham Hotspur	2–0	3–0	5–0	Yes
Watford	2–1	2–1	4–2	Yes
West Ham United	1–0	2–3	3–3	No
Wolves	2–2	0–0	2–2	No

==== Matches ====
The league fixtures were announced on 16 June 2021.

14 August 2021 1	Chelsea	3–0	Crystal Palace	Fulham
15:00 BST	Alonso 27'; Pulisic 40'; Chalobah 58'	Report		Stadium: Stamford Bridge; Attendance: 38,965; Referee: Jonathan Moss

22 August 2021 2	Arsenal	0–2	Chelsea	Highbury
16:30 BST	Marí (yellow card) 34'; Holding (yellow card) 45'; Lokonga (yellow card) 67'	Report	Lukaku 15'; James 35'	Stadium: Emirates Stadium; Attendance: 58,729; Referee: Paul Tierney

28 August 2021 3	Liverpool	1–1	Chelsea	Liverpool
17:30 BST	Salah 45+5' (pen.)	Report	Havertz 22'; James (red card) 45+3'; Rüdiger (yellow card) 45+3'; Mendy (yellow card) 45+5'	Stadium: Anfield; Attendance: 53,100; Referee: Anthony Taylor

11 September 2021 4	Chelsea	3–0	Aston Villa	Fulham
17:30 BST	Lukaku 15', 90+3'; Kovačić 49'; Alonso (yellow card) 61'	Report	Ramsey (yellow card) 8'; Mings (yellow card) 28'; McGinn (yellow card) 90'; Targett (yellow card) 90'	Stadium: Stamford Bridge; Attendance: 39,969; Referee: Stuart Attwell

19 September 2021 5	Tottenham Hotspur	0–3	Chelsea	London
16:30 BST		Report	Thiago Silva 49'; Kanté 57'; Werner (yellow card) 80'; Rüdiger 90+2'	Stadium: Tottenham Hotspur Stadium; Attendance: 60,059; Referee: Paul Tierney

25 September 2021 6	Chelsea	0–1	Manchester City	Fulham
12:30 BST	Alonso (yellow card) 77'; Christensen (yellow card) 78'; Rüdiger (yellow card) 84'	Report	Gabriel Jesus 53'; Laporte (yellow card) 65'; Dias (yellow card) 90+6'	Stadium: Stamford Bridge; Attendance: 40,036; Referee: Michael Oliver

2 October 2021 7	Chelsea	3–1	Southampton	Fulham
15:00 BST	Chalobah 9'; Thiago Silva (yellow card) 55'; Werner 84'; Chilwell 89'	Report	Romeu (yellow card) 34'; Ward-Prowse 61' (pen.), (red card) 77'; Salisu (yellow card) 90+1'; Djenepo (yellow card) 90+5'	Stadium: Stamford Bridge; Attendance: 40,109; Referee: Martin Atkinson

16 October 2021 8	Brentford	0–1	Chelsea	Brentford
17:30 BST	Canós (yellow card) 32'	Report	Kovačić (yellow card) 18'; Chilwell 45'	Stadium: Brentford Community Stadium; Attendance: 16,940; Referee: Anthony Taylor

23 October 2021 9	Chelsea	7–0	Norwich City	Fulham
12:30 BST	Mount 8', 85' (pen.), 90+1'; Hudson-Odoi 18'; James 42'; Chilwell 57'; Aarons 62' (o.g.)	Report	Lees-Melou (yellow card) 45'; Gibson (yellow card) 55' (yellow-red card) 65'; Normann (yellow card) 83'	Stadium: Stamford Bridge; Attendance: 40,113; Referee: Andrew Madley

30 October 2021 10	Newcastle United	0–3	Chelsea	Newcastle upon Tyne
15:00 BST	Hayden (yellow card) 17'; Ritchie (yellow card) 39'; Lascelles (yellow card) 55'	Report	Kanté (yellow card) 54'; Ziyech (yellow card) 57'; James 65', 77'; Jorginho 81' (pen.)	Stadium: St James' Park; Attendance: 52,208; Referee: Paul Tierney

6 November 2021 11	Chelsea	1–1	Burnley	Fulham
15:00 GMT	Havertz 33'; James (yellow card) 76'	Report	Westwood (yellow card) 68'; Cornet (yellow card) 76'; Vydra 80'; Tarkowski (yellow card) 84'; Brownhill (yellow card) 90'	Stadium: Stamford Bridge; Attendance: 39,798; Referee: Andre Marriner

20 November 2021 12	Leicester City	0–3	Chelsea	Leicester
12:30 GMT	Amartey (yellow card) 40'; Evans (yellow card) 45'; Schmeichel (yellow card) 45'	Report	Rüdiger 14'; Kanté 28'; Mendy (yellow card) 65'; Pulisic 71'	Stadium: King Power; Attendance: 32,192; Referee: Paul Tierney

28 November 2021 13	Chelsea	1–1	Manchester United	Fulham
16:30 GMT	James (yellow card) 53'; Jorginho 69' (pen.), (yellow card) 90+5'	Report	McTominay (yellow card) 45'; Rashford (yellow card) 49'; Sancho 50'; Fernandes (yellow card) 77'; Ronaldo (yellow card) 90+2'; Bailly (yellow card) 90+6'	Stadium: Stamford Bridge; Attendance: 40,041; Referee: Anthony Taylor

1 December 2021 14	Watford	1–2	Chelsea	Watford
19:30 GMT	Dennis 43'; Louza (yellow card) 45'; Troost-Ekong (yellow card) 45+4'; Cleverley (yellow card) 84'; Rose (yellow card) 84'	Report	Saúl (yellow card) 16'; Mount 29'; Alonso (yellow card) 45+2'; Ziyech (yellow card) 65', (goal) 72'	Stadium: Vicarage Road; Attendance: 20,388; Referee: David Coote

4 December 2021 15	West Ham United	3–2	Chelsea	London
12:30 GMT	Lanzini 40' (pen.); Bowen 56'; Masuaku 87'; Coufal (yellow card) 90+1'	Report	Jorginho (yellow card) 23'; Thiago Silva 28'; Mount 44'; James (yellow card) 90+2'; Christensen (yellow card) 90+4'	Stadium: London; Attendance: 59,942; Referee: Andre Marriner

11 December 2021 16	Chelsea	3–2	Leeds United	Fulham
15:00 GMT	James (yellow card) 34'; Mount 42', (yellow card) 60'; Jorginho 58' (pen.), 90+4' (pen.)	Report	Raphinha 28' (pen.); Firpo (yellow card) 42'; Shackleton (yellow card) 53'; Klich (yellow card) 69'; Gelhardt 83'; Meslier (yellow card) 90+3'; Llorente (yellow card) 90+6'	Stadium: Stamford Bridge; Attendance: 39,959; Referee: Chris Kavanagh

16 December 2021 17	Chelsea	1–1	Everton	Fulham
19:45 GMT	Loftus-Cheek (yellow card) 45'; Jorginho (yellow card) 59'; Mount 70'	Report	Holgate (yellow card) 21'; Gomes (yellow card) 64'; Branthwaite 74'; Dobbin (yellow card) 77'	Stadium: Stamford Bridge; Attendance: 39,933; Referee: Michael Oliver

19 December 2021 18	Wolverhampton Wanderers	0–0	Chelsea	Wolverhampton
14:00 GMT		Report	Chalobah (yellow card) 30'; Rüdiger (yellow card) 33'	Stadium: Molineux; Attendance: 30,631; Referee: David Coote

26 December 2021 19	Aston Villa	1–3	Chelsea	Birmingham
17:30 GMT	James 28' (o.g.); Martínez (yellow card) 33'; Mings (yellow card) 65'; Konsa (yellow card) 90+2'	Report	Jorginho 34' (pen.), 90+3' (pen.); Lukaku 56'; Alonso (yellow card) 70'	Stadium: Villa Park; Attendance: 41,907; Referee: Martin Atkinson

29 December 2021 20	Chelsea	1–1	Brighton & Hove Albion	Fulham
19:30 GMT	Lukaku 28'; Rüdiger (yellow card) 41'; Kovačić (yellow card) 58'; Hudson-Odoi (yellow card) 64'; Mount (yellow card) 81'	Report	Bissouma (yellow card) 81'; Welbeck 90+1'	Stadium: Stamford Bridge; Attendance: 40,080; Referee: Mike Dean

2 January 2022 21	Chelsea	2–2	Liverpool	Fulham
16:30 GMT	Pulisic (yellow card) 17', (goal) 45+1'; Kovačić 42'	Report	Mané (yellow card) 1', (goal) 9'; Salah 26'; Konaté (yellow card) 83'	Stadium: Stamford Bridge; Attendance: 40,072; Referee: Anthony Taylor

15 January 2022 22	Manchester City	1–0	Chelsea	Manchester
12:30 GMT	De Bruyne 70'	Report	Alonso (yellow card) 7'; Kovačić (yellow card) 32'	Stadium: City of Manchester Stadium; Attendance: 53,319; Referee: Craig Pawson

18 January 2022 23	Brighton & Hove Albion	1–1	Chelsea	Falmer
20:00 GMT	Webster 60'; Burn (yellow card) 80'	Report	Ziyech 28'; Alonso (yellow card) 59'; Rüdiger (yellow card) 81'	Stadium: Falmer Stadium; Attendance: 30,880; Referee: Kevin Friend
Note: The match was originally due to be played on 8 February, but was brought forward due to Chelsea's involvement in the 2021 FIFA Club World Cup.

23 January 2022 24	Chelsea	2–0	Tottenham Hotspur	Fulham
16:30 GMT	Thiago Silva (yellow card) 24', (goal) 55'; Jorginho (yellow card) 42'; Ziyech 47'	Report	Tanganga (yellow card) 37'	Stadium: Stamford Bridge; Attendance: 40,020; Referee: Paul Tierney

19 February 2022 25	Crystal Palace	0–1	Chelsea	Selhurst
15:00 GMT	Olise (yellow card) 68'	Report	Sarr (yellow card) 62'; Ziyech 89'; Havertz (yellow card) 90+2'; Pulisic (yellow card) 90+3'	Stadium: Selhurst Park; Attendance: 25,109; Referee: David Coote

5 March 2022 26	Burnley	0–4	Chelsea	Burnley
15:00 GMT	Barnes (yellow card) 84'; Westwood (yellow card) 89'	Report	James 47'; Havertz 52', 55'; Pulisic 69'	Stadium: Turf Moor; Attendance: 19,439; Referee: Andre Marriner

10 March 2022 27	Norwich City	1–3	Chelsea	Norwich
19:30 GMT	Pukki 69' (pen.)	Report	Chalobah 3', (yellow card) 80'; Mount 14'; Mendy (yellow card) 68'; Havertz 90'	Stadium: Carrow Road; Attendance: 26,722; Referee: Martin Atkinson

13 March 2022 28	Chelsea	1–0	Newcastle United	Fulham
14:00 GMT	Havertz (yellow card) 39', (goal) 89'; Ziyech (yellow card) 58'; Kovačić (yellow card) 87'; Rüdiger (yellow card) 90+1'	Report	Murphy (yellow card) 50'; Bruno Guimarães (yellow card) 80'; Gayle (yellow card) 90+2'	Stadium: Stamford Bridge; Attendance: 40,026; Referee: David Coote

2 April 2022 29	Chelsea	1–4	Brentford	Fulham
15:00 BST	Rüdiger 48'	Report	Janelt 50', 60'; Eriksen 54'; Wissa 87'	Stadium: Stamford Bridge; Attendance: 39,061; Referee: Andrew Madley

9 April 2022 30	Southampton	0–6	Chelsea	Southampton
15:00 BST	Bednarek (yellow card) 60'	Report	Alonso 8'; Mount 16', 54'; Werner 21', 49'; Havertz 31'	Stadium: St Mary's Stadium; Attendance: 31,359; Referee: Kevin Friend

20 April 2022 31	Chelsea	2–4	Arsenal	Fulham
19:45 BST	Werner 17'; Azpilicueta 32', (yellow card) 90+2'; Sarr (yellow card) 65'; Mount (yellow card) 85'	Report	Nketiah 13', 57'; Smith Rowe 27'; Gabriel (yellow card) 90+1'; Saka 90+2' (pen.)	Stadium: Stamford Bridge; Attendance: 32,249; Referee: Jonathan Moss

24 April 2022 32	Chelsea	1–0	West Ham United	Fulham
14:00 BST	Alonso (yellow card) 82'; Jorginho (penalty missed) 87'; Pulisic 90'	Report	Dawson (red card) 86'	Stadium: Stamford Bridge; Attendance: 32,231; Referee: Michael Oliver

28 April 2022 33	Manchester United	1–1	Chelsea	Manchester
19:45 BST	Ronaldo 62'	Report	Alonso 60'; Rüdiger (yellow card) 87'	Stadium: Old Trafford; Attendance: 73,564; Referee: Mike Dean

1 May 2022 34	Everton	1–0	Chelsea	Walton
14:00 BST	Coleman (yellow card) 38'; Delph (yellow card) 45+2'; Richarlison 47'; Holgate (yellow card) 90+6'	Report	Rüdiger (yellow card) 17'; Mount (yellow card) 36'; Azpilicueta (yellow card) 38'; Alonso (yellow card) 76'; Havertz (yellow card) 83'	Stadium: Goodison Park; Attendance: 39,256; Referee: Kevin Friend

7 May 2022 35	Chelsea	2–2	Wolverhampton Wanderers	Fulham
15:00 BST	Azpilicueta (yellow card) 27'; Lukaku 56' (pen.), 58'	Report	Saïss (yellow card) 36'; Neto (yellow card) 45+2'; Moutinho (yellow card) 51'; Trincão 79'; Coady 90+7'	Stadium: Stamford Bridge; Attendance: 32,190; Referee: Peter Bankes

11 May 2022 36	Leeds United	0–3	Chelsea	Leeds
19:30 BST	James (red card) 24'; Phillips (yellow card) 43'	Report	Mount 4'; Pulisic 55'; Lukaku 83'	Stadium: Elland Road; Attendance: 36,549; Referee: Anthony Taylor

19 May 2022 37	Chelsea	1–1	Leicester City	Fulham
20:00 BST	Alonso 34'; Kanté (yellow card) 47'; Lukaku (yellow card) 59'; Rüdiger (yellow card) 66'; Jorginho (yellow card) 85'	Report	Maddison 6'; Evans (yellow card) 64'	Stadium: Stamford Bridge; Attendance: 31,478; Referee: Stuart Attwell

22 May 2022 38	Chelsea	2–1	Watford	Fulham
16:00 BST	Havertz 11'; Barkley 90+1'	Report	Gosling 87'	Stadium: Stamford Bridge; Attendance: 32,089; Referee: Mike Dean

=== FA Cup ===
Chelsea were drawn at home to Chesterfield in the third round. In the fourth round, Chelsea were drawn at home to Plymouth Argyle. They were drawn away to Luton Town in the fifth round. In the quarter-finals, Chelsea were drawn away to Middlesbrough.

8 January 2022 Third round	Chelsea	5–1	Chesterfield	Fulham
17:30 GMT	Werner 6'; Saúl (yellow card) 8'; Hudson-Odoi 18'; Lukaku 20'; Christensen 39'; Ziyech 55' (pen.)	Report	King (yellow card) 29'; Asante 80'	Stadium: Stamford Bridge; Attendance: 39,795; Referee: Jarred Gillett

5 February 2022 Fourth round	Chelsea	2–1 (a.e.t.)	Plymouth Argyle	Fulham
12:30 GMT	Jorginho (yellow card) 19'; Azpilicueta 41'; Alonso 105+1'; Havertz (yellow card) 120+1'	Report	Gillesphey 8'; Cooper (yellow card) 102'; Hardie (penalty missed) 117'	Stadium: Stamford Bridge; Attendance: 39,959; Referee: Simon Hooper

2 March 2022 Fifth round	Luton Town	2–3	Chelsea	Luton
19:15 GMT	Burke 2'; Cornick 40'; Muskwe (yellow card) 67'	Report	Saúl 27'; Werner 68'; Lukaku 78'	Stadium: Kenilworth Road; Attendance: 10,140; Referee: Peter Bankes

19 March 2022 Quarter-finals	Middlesbrough	0–2	Chelsea	Middlesbrough
17:15 GMT	Howson (yellow card) 87'; Peltier (yellow card) 89'	Report	Lukaku 15'; Ziyech 31'	Stadium: Riverside; Attendance: 31,422; Referee: Paul Tierney

17 April 2022 Semi-finals	Chelsea	2–0	Crystal Palace	London
16:30 BST	Havertz (yellow card) 38'; Loftus-Cheek 65'; Mount 76'	Report		Stadium: Wembley Stadium; Attendance: 76,238; Referee: Anthony Taylor

14 May 2022 Final	Chelsea	0–0 (a.e.t.) (5–6 p)	Liverpool	London
16:45 BST	James (yellow card) 77'	Report		Stadium: Wembley Stadium; Attendance: 84,897; Referee: Craig Pawson
	Penalties
	Alonso (penalty scored); Azpilicueta (penalty missed); James (penalty scored); Barkley (penalty scored); Jorginho (penalty scored); Ziyech (penalty scored); Mount (penalty missed)		(penalty scored) Milner; (penalty scored) Thiago; (penalty scored) Firmino; (penalty scored) Alexander-Arnold; (penalty missed) Mané; (penalty scored) Jota; (penalty scored) Tsimikas

=== EFL Cup ===
Chelsea entered the competition in the third round, due to participation in UEFA competitions, and were drawn at home to Aston Villa. In the fourth round they were again drawn at home, against Southampton.

22 September 2021 Third round	Chelsea	1–1 (4–3 p)	Aston Villa	Fulham
19:45 BST	Sarr (yellow card) 31'; Werner 54'; James (yellow card) 90+2'	Report	Archer 64'; Young (yellow card) 86'	Stadium: Stamford Bridge; Attendance: 35,892; Referee: Graham Scott
	Penalties
	Lukaku (penalty scored); Mount (penalty scored); Barkley (penalty scored); Chilwell (penalty missed); James (penalty scored)		(penalty scored) El Ghazi; (penalty missed) Young; (penalty missed) Nakamba; (penalty scored) Konsa; (penalty scored) Buendía

26 October 2021 Fourth round	Chelsea	1–1 (4–3 p)	Southampton	Fulham
19:45 BST	Havertz 44'	Report	Diallo (yellow card) 23'; Adams 47'; Djenepo (yellow card) 80'; Forster (yellow card) 90+1'	Stadium: Stamford Bridge; Attendance: 39,766; Referee: Kevin Friend
	Penalties
	Alonso (penalty scored); Mount (penalty missed); Hudson-Odoi (penalty scored); Chilwell (penalty scored); James (penalty scored)		(penalty scored) A. Armstrong; (penalty missed) Walcott; (penalty scored) Long; (penalty missed) Smallbone; (penalty scored) Romeu

22 December 2021 Quarter-finals	Brentford	0–2	Chelsea	Brentford
19:45 GMT	Janelt (yellow card) 12'; Canós (yellow card) 68'	Report	Vale (yellow card) 45'; Saúl (yellow card) 77'; Jansson 80' (o.g.); Jorginho 85' (pen.)	Stadium: Brentford Community Stadium; Attendance: 16,577; Referee: Andre Marriner

5 January 2022 Semi-finals first leg	Chelsea	2–0	Tottenham Hotspur	Fulham
19:45 GMT	Havertz 5'; Davies 34' (o.g.); Sarr (yellow card) 62'	Report		Stadium: Stamford Bridge; Attendance: 37,868; Referee: Craig Pawson

12 January 2022 Semi-finals second leg	Tottenham Hotspur	0–1 (0–3 agg.)	Chelsea	Tottenham
19:45 GMT		Report	Rüdiger 18'	Stadium: Tottenham Hotspur Stadium; Attendance: 45,603; Referee: Andre Marriner

27 February 2022 Final	Chelsea	0–0 (a.e.t.) (10–11 p)	Liverpool	London
16:30 GMT	Kovačić (yellow card) 90'; Kanté (yellow card) 99'; Havertz (yellow card) 105+2'	Report	Alexander-Arnold (yellow card) 105+2'	Stadium: Wembley Stadium; Attendance: 85,512; Referee: Stuart Attwell
	Penalties
	Alonso (penalty scored); Lukaku (penalty scored); Havertz (penalty scored); James (penalty scored); Jorginho (penalty scored); Rüdiger (penalty scored); Kanté (penalty scored); Werner (penalty scored); Thiago Silva (penalty scored); Chalobah (penalty scored); Arrizabalaga (penalty missed)		(penalty scored) Milner; (penalty scored) Fabinho; (penalty scored) Van Dijk; (penalty scored) Alexander-Arnold; (penalty scored) Salah; (penalty scored) Jota; (penalty scored) Origi; (penalty scored) Robertson; (penalty scored) Elliott; (penalty scored) Konaté; (penalty scored) Kelleher

=== UEFA Champions League ===
==== Group stage ====
The draw for the group stage was held on 26 August 2021.

Pos	Team	Pld	W	D	L	GF	GA	GD	Pts	Qualification	JUV	CHE	ZEN	MAL
1	(Italy) Juventus	6	5	0	1	10	6	+4	15	Advance to knockout phase	—	1–0	4–2	1–0
2	(England) Chelsea	6	4	1	1	13	4	+9	13	Advance to knockout phase	4–0	—	1–0	4–0
3	(Russia) Zenit Saint Petersburg	6	1	2	3	10	10	0	5	Transfer to Europa League	0–1	3–3	—	4–0
4	(Sweden) Malmö FF	6	0	1	5	1	14	−13	1		0–3	0–1	1–1	—

Source: UEFA
Rules for classification: Group stage tiebreakers

14 September 2021 1	Chelsea (England)	1–0	(Russia) Zenit Saint Petersburg	London, England
20:00 BST	Azpilicueta (yellow card) 45'; Lukaku 69'	Report	Rakitskyi (yellow card) 62'	Stadium: Stamford Bridge; Attendance: 39,252; Referee: Bartosz Frankowski (Poland)

29 September 2021 2	Juventus (Italy)	1–0	(England) Chelsea	Turin, Italy
21:00 CEST	Chiesa 46'; Cuadrado (yellow card) 89'	Report	Alonso (yellow card) 18'; Ziyech (yellow card) 61'; Rüdiger (yellow card) 65'	Stadium: Juventus Stadium; Attendance: 19,934; Referee: Jesús Gil Manzano (Spain)

20 October 2021 3	Chelsea (England)	4–0	(Sweden) Malmö FF	London, England
20:00 BST	Christensen 9'; Jorginho 21' (pen.), 57' (pen.); Havertz 48'	Report	Nielsen (yellow card) 19'; Christiansen (yellow card) 53'; Larsson (yellow card) 55'	Stadium: Stamford Bridge; Attendance: 39,095; Referee: François Letexier (France)

2 November 2021 4	Malmö FF (Sweden)	0–1	(England) Chelsea	Malmö, Sweden
18:45 CET		Report	Ziyech 56'; Thiago Silva (yellow card) 69'; Loftus-Cheek (yellow card) 80'	Stadium: Stadion; Attendance: 19,551; Referee: Felix Brych (Germany)

23 November 2021 5	Chelsea (England)	4–0	(Italy) Juventus	London, England
20:00 GMT	Chalobah 25'; James 56'; Hudson-Odoi 58'; Werner 90+5'	Report	Cuadrado (yellow card) 23'	Stadium: Stamford Bridge; Attendance: 39,513; Referee: Srđan Jovanović (Serbia)

8 December 2021 6	Zenit Saint Petersburg (Russia)	3–3	(England) Chelsea	Saint Petersburg, Russia
20:45 MSK (UTC+03:00)	Claudinho 38'; Azmoun 41'; Lovren (yellow card) 60'; Ozdoyev 90+4'	Report	Werner 2', 85'; Hudson-Odoi (yellow card) 37'; Lukaku 62'	Stadium: Krestovsky Stadium; Attendance: 29,349; Referee: Serdar Gözübüyük (Netherlands)

==== Knockout phase ====
===== Round of 16 =====
The round of 16 draw was held on 13 December 2021.

22 February 2022 First leg	Chelsea (England)	2–0	(France) Lille	London, England
20:00 GMT	Havertz 8'; Pulisic 63'; Loftus-Cheek (yellow card) 83'	Report	Ben Arfa (yellow card) 87'	Stadium: Stamford Bridge; Attendance: 38,832; Referee: Jesús Gil Manzano (Spain)

16 March 2022 Second leg	Lille (France)	1–2 (1–4 agg.)	(England) Chelsea	Villeneuve-d'Ascq, France
21:00 CET	Yılmaz 38' (pen.); Gudmundsson (yellow card) 43'; Fonte (yellow card) 90+4'	Report	Chalobah (yellow card) 34'; Pulisic 45+3'; Azpilicueta 71'	Stadium: Stade Pierre-Mauroy; Attendance: 49,048; Referee: Davide Massa (Italy)

===== Quarter-finals =====
The draw for the quarter-finals was held on 18 March 2022.

6 April 2022 First leg	Chelsea (England)	1–3	(Spain) Real Madrid	London, England
20:00 BST (UTC+1)	Rüdiger (yellow card) 19'; Havertz 40'	Report	Militão (yellow card) 14'; Benzema 21', 24', 46'	Stadium: Stamford Bridge; Attendance: 38,689; Referee: Clément Turpin (France)

12 April 2022 Second leg	Real Madrid (Spain)	2–3 (a.e.t.) (5–4 agg.)	(England) Chelsea	Madrid, Spain
21:00 CEST (UTC+2)	Benzema (yellow card) 37', (goal) 96'; Valverde (yellow card) 68'; Rodrygo 80'; Camavinga (yellow card) 90+1'; Carvajal (yellow card) 118'	Report	James (yellow card) 10'; Mount 15'; Rüdiger 51'; Werner 75'; Ziyech (yellow card) 102'; Havertz (yellow card) 109'; Azpilicueta (yellow card) 113'	Stadium: Santiago Bernabéu; Attendance: 59,839; Referee: Szymon Marciniak (Poland)
Note: Chelsea manager Thomas Tuchel was cautioned (yellow card) in the 113th minute for dissent.

=== UEFA Super Cup ===
11 August 2021 Final	Chelsea (England)	1–1 (a.e.t.) (6–5 p)	(Spain) Villarreal	Belfast, Northern Ireland
21:00 CEST (UTC+2)	Ziyech 27'; Rüdiger (yellow card) 44'; Arrizabalaga (yellow card) 120+'	Report	Pino (yellow card) 61'; Gerard 73'; Raba (yellow card) 119'	Stadium: Windsor Park; Attendance: 10,435; Referee: Sergei Karasev (Russia)
	Penalties
	Havertz (penalty missed); Azpilicueta (penalty scored); Alonso (penalty scored); Mount (penalty scored); Jorginho (penalty scored); Pulisic (penalty scored); Rüdiger (penalty scored)		(penalty scored) Gerard; (penalty missed) Mandi; (penalty scored) Estupiñán; (penalty scored) Gómez; (penalty scored) Raba; (penalty scored) Foyth; (penalty missed) Albiol

=== FIFA Club World Cup ===
9 February 2022 Semi-finals	Al Hilal (Saudi Arabia)	0–1	(England) Chelsea	Abu Dhabi, United Arab Emirates
20:30 GST (UTC+4)	Cuéllar (yellow card) 66'; Al-Bulaihi (yellow card) 84'	Report	Lukaku 32'; Kovačić (yellow card) 81'	Stadium: Mohammed bin Zayed Stadium; Attendance: 19,175; Referee: César Ramos (Mexico)

12 February 2022 Final	Chelsea (England)	2–1 (a.e.t.)	(Brazil) Palmeiras	Abu Dhabi, United Arab Emirates
20:30 GST (UTC+4)	Lukaku 55'; Havertz 117' (pen.), (yellow card) 118'	Report	Veiga 64' (pen.); Wesley (yellow card) 105'; Luan (yellow card) 115', (red card) 120+6'; Atuesta (yellow card) 116'	Stadium: Mohammed bin Zayed Stadium; Attendance: 32,871; Referee: Chris Beath (Australia)

== Statistics ==
=== Appearances ===
No.	Pos.	Player	Premier League	FA Cup	EFL Cup	UEFA Champions League	UEFA Super Cup	FIFA Club World Cup	Total
1	GK	(Spain) Kepa Arrizabalaga	4	2	6	1	1	1	15
2	DF	(Germany) Antonio Rüdiger	34	5	3	9	1	2	54
3	DF	(Spain) Marcos Alonso	28	3	5	8	1	1	46
4	DF	(Denmark) Andreas Christensen	19	3	1	8	1	2	34
5	MF	(Italy) Jorginho	29	4	4	8	1	1	47
6	DF	(Brazil) Thiago Silva	32	3	2	9	0	2	48
7	MF	(France) N'Golo Kanté	26	3	4	6	1	2	42
8	MF	(Croatia) Mateo Kovačić	25	5	5	6	1	2	44
9	FW	(Belgium) Romelu Lukaku	26	6	4	6	0	2	44
10	FW	(United States) Christian Pulisic	22	4	3	7	1	1	38
11	FW	(Germany) Timo Werner	21	5	4	5	1	1	37
12	MF	(England) Ruben Loftus-Cheek	23	5	3	8	0	0	39
13	GK	(England) Marcus Bettinelli	0	1	0	0	0	0	1
14	DF	(England) Trevoh Chalobah	20	2	4	3	1	0	30
16	GK	(Senegal) Édouard Mendy	33	3	1	9	1	1	48
17	MF	(Spain) Saúl	10	3	4	5	0	1	23
18	MF	(England) Ross Barkley	6	2	3	3	0	0	14
19	MF	(England) Mason Mount	32	5	6	7	1	2	53
20	FW	(England) Callum Hudson-Odoi	15	3	3	5	1	1	28
21	DF	(England) Ben Chilwell	7	0	2	4	0	0	13
22	FW	(Morocco) Hakim Ziyech	23	5	4	9	1	2	44
23	FW	(Brazil) Kenedy	1	2	0	0	0	0	3
24	DF	(England) Reece James	26	3	4	6	0	0	39
28	DF	(Spain) César Azpilicueta	27	4	4	9	1	2	47
29	FW	(Germany) Kai Havertz	29	3	3	9	1	2	47
31	DF	(France) Malang Sarr	8	4	5	2	0	2	21
54	MF	(England) Xavier Simons	0	0	1	0	0	0	1
64	FW	(Thailand) Jude Soonsup-Bell	0	0	1	0	0	0	1
68	MF	(England) Harvey Vale	0	3	2	0	0	0	5
75	MF	(England) Lewis Hall	0	1	0	0	0	0	1
Players have left the club
15	DF	(France) Kurt Zouma	0	0	0	0	1	0	1
32	MF	(England) Lewis Baker	0	1	0	0	0	0	1
33	DF	(Italy) Emerson	1	0	0	0	0	0	1

Last updated: 22 May 2022.
Source: FBref.com

=== Goalscorers ===
Rank	No.	Pos.	Player	Premier League	FA Cup	EFL Cup	UEFA Champions League	UEFA Super Cup	FIFA Club World Cup	Total
1	9	FW	(Belgium) Romelu Lukaku	8	3	0	2	0	2	15
2	29	FW	(Germany) Kai Havertz	8	0	2	3	0	1	14
3	19	MF	(England) Mason Mount	11	1	0	1	0	0	13
4	11	FW	(Germany) Timo Werner	4	2	1	4	0	0	11
5	5	MF	(Italy) Jorginho	6	0	1	2	0	0	9
6	10	FW	(United States) Christian Pulisic	6	0	0	2	0	0	8
6	22	FW	(Morocco) Hakim Ziyech	4	2	0	1	1	0	8
8	24	DF	(England) Reece James	5	0	0	1	0	0	6
9	2	DF	(Germany) Antonio Rüdiger	3	0	1	1	0	0	5
9	3	DF	(Spain) Marcos Alonso	4	1	0	0	0	0	5
11	14	DF	(England) Trevoh Chalobah	3	0	0	1	0	0	4
12	6	DF	(Brazil) Thiago Silva	3	0	0	0	0	0	3
12	20	FW	(England) Callum Hudson-Odoi	1	1	0	1	0	0	3
12	21	DF	(England) Ben Chilwell	3	0	0	0	0	0	3
12	28	DF	(Spain) César Azpilicueta	1	1	0	1	0	0	3
16	4	DF	(Denmark) Andreas Christensen	0	1	0	1	0	0	2
16	7	MF	(France) N'Golo Kanté	2	0	0	0	0	0	2
16	8	MF	(Croatia) Mateo Kovačić	2	0	0	0	0	0	2
19	12	MF	(England) Ruben Loftus-Cheek	0	1	0	0	0	0	1
19	17	MF	(Spain) Saúl	0	1	0	0	0	0	1
19	18	MF	(England) Ross Barkley	1	0	0	0	0	0	1
Own goals				1	0	2	0	0	0	3
Totals				76	14	7	21	1	3	122

Last updated: 22 May 2022.
Source: FBref.com

=== Top assists ===
Rank	No.	Pos.	Player	Premier League	FA Cup	EFL Cup	UEFA Champions League	UEFA Super Cup	FIFA Club World Cup	Total
1	19	MF	(England) Mason Mount	10	3	1	2	0	0	16
2	24	DF	(England) Reece James	9	0	1	0	0	0	10
3	11	FW	(Germany) Timo Werner	1	3	0	2	0	0	6
3	22	FW	(Morocco) Hakim Ziyech	3	0	1	2	0	0	6
5	3	DF	(Spain) Marcos Alonso	4	0	1	0	0	0	5
5	7	MF	(France) N'Golo Kanté	4	0	0	1	0	0	5
5	8	MF	(Croatia) Mateo Kovačić	5	0	0	0	0	0	5
5	20	FW	(England) Callum Hudson-Odoi	2	0	0	2	0	1	5
5	29	FW	(Germany) Kai Havertz	3	1	0	0	1	0	5
10	5	MF	(Italy) Jorginho	2	0	0	2	0	0	4
10	10	FW	(United States) Christian Pulisic	2	1	0	1	0	0	4
10	12	MF	(England) Ruben Loftus-Cheek	2	1	0	1	0	0	4
13	28	DF	(Spain) César Azpilicueta	2	0	0	1	0	0	3
14	4	DF	(Denmark) Andreas Christensen	0	0	0	1	0	0	1
14	6	DF	(Brazil) Thiago Silva	0	0	0	1	0	0	1
14	14	DF	(England) Trevoh Chalobah	1	0	0	0	0	0	1
14	21	DF	(England) Ben Chilwell	1	0	0	0	0	0	1
14	23	FW	(Brazil) Kenedy	1	0	0	0	0	0	1
14	75	DF	(England) Lewis Hall	0	1	0	0	0	0	1
Totals				52	10	4	16	1	1	84

Last updated: 22 May 2021.
Source: FBref.com

=== Clean sheets ===
Rank	No.	Pos.	Player	Premier League	FA Cup	EFL Cup	UEFA Champions League	UEFA Super Cup	FIFA Club World Cup	Total
1	16	GK	(Senegal) Edouard Mendy	14	3	1	5	0	0	23
2	1	GK	(Spain) Kepa Arrizabalaga	2	0	4	0	0	1	7
Totals				16	3	5	5	0	1	30

Last updated: 22 May 2022.
Source: FBref.com

=== Discipline ===
No.	Pos.	Name	Premier League			FA Cup			EFL Cup			UEFA Champions League			UEFA Super Cup			FIFA Club World Cup			Total		
No.	Pos.	Name	Yellow card	(yellow card) (yellow-red card)	Red card	Yellow card	(yellow card) (yellow-red card)	Red card	Yellow card	(yellow card) (yellow-red card)	Red card	Yellow card	(yellow card) (yellow-red card)	Red card	Yellow card	(yellow card) (yellow-red card)	Red card	Yellow card	(yellow card) (yellow-red card)	Red card	Yellow card	(yellow card) (yellow-red card)	Red card
1	GK	(Spain) Kepa Arrizabalaga	0	0	0	0	0	0	0	0	0	0	0	0	1	0	0	0	0	0	1	0	0
2	DF	(Germany) Antonio Rüdiger	9	0	0	0	0	0	0	0	0	2	0	0	1	0	0	0	0	0	12	0	0
3	DF	(Spain) Marcos Alonso	8	0	0	0	0	0	0	0	0	1	0	0	0	0	0	0	0	0	9	0	0
4	DF	(Denmark) Andreas Christensen	2	0	0	0	0	0	0	0	0	0	0	0	0	0	0	0	0	0	2	0	0
5	MF	(Italy) Jorginho	4	0	0	1	0	0	0	0	0	0	0	0	0	0	0	0	0	0	5	0	0
6	DF	(Brazil) Thiago Silva	2	0	0	0	0	0	0	0	0	1	0	0	0	0	0	0	0	0	3	0	0
7	MF	(France) N'Golo Kanté	2	0	0	0	0	0	1	0	0	0	0	0	0	0	0	0	0	0	3	0	0
8	MF	(Croatia) Mateo Kovačić	4	0	0	0	0	0	1	0	0	0	0	0	0	0	0	1	0	0	6	0	0
9	FW	(Belgium) Romelu Lukaku	1	0	0	0	0	0	1	0	0	0	0	0	0	0	0	0	0	0	2	0	0
10	FW	(United States) Christian Pulisic	2	0	0	0	0	0	0	0	0	0	0	0	0	0	0	0	0	0	2	0	0
11	FW	(Germany) Timo Werner	1	0	0	0	0	0	0	0	0	0	0	0	0	0	0	0	0	0	1	0	0
12	MF	(England) Ruben Loftus-Cheek	1	0	0	0	0	0	0	0	0	2	0	0	0	0	0	0	0	0	3	0	0
14	DF	(England) Trevoh Chalobah	2	0	0	0	0	0	0	0	0	1	0	0	0	0	0	0	0	0	3	0	0
16	GK	(Senegal) Édouard Mendy	3	0	0	0	0	0	0	0	0	0	0	0	0	0	0	0	0	0	3	0	0
17	MF	(Spain) Saúl	1	0	0	1	0	0	1	0	0	0	0	0	0	0	0	0	0	0	3	0	0
19	MF	(England) Mason Mount	4	0	0	0	0	0	0	0	0	0	0	0	0	0	0	0	0	0	4	0	0
20	FW	(England) Callum Hudson-Odoi	1	0	0	0	0	0	0	0	0	1	0	0	0	0	0	0	0	0	2	0	0
22	FW	(Morocco) Hakim Ziyech	3	0	0	0	0	0	0	0	0	2	0	0	0	0	0	0	0	0	5	0	0
24	DF	(England) Reece James	4	0	1	1	0	0	1	0	0	1	0	0	0	0	0	0	0	0	7	0	1
28	DF	(Spain) César Azpilicueta	3	0	0	0	0	0	0	0	0	2	0	0	0	0	0	0	0	0	5	0	0
29	FW	(Germany) Kai Havertz	2	0	0	2	0	0	1	0	0	1	0	0	0	0	0	1	0	0	7	0	0
31	DF	(France) Malang Sarr	2	0	0	0	0	0	2	0	0	0	0	0	0	0	0	0	0	0	4	0	0
68	MF	(England) Harvey Vale	0	0	0	0	0	0	1	0	0	0	0	0	0	0	0	0	0	0	1	0	0
—		(Germany) Thomas Tuchel	1	0	0	0	0	0	0	0	0	1	0	0	1	0	0	0	0	0	3	0	0
Totals			62	0	1	5	0	0	8	0	0	15	0	0	3	0	0	2	0	0	85	0	1

Last updated: 22 May 2022.
Source: FBref.com
Thomas Tuchel was cautioned in UEFA Super Cup Premier League Gameweek 13 (Chelsea 1–1 Manchester United), and Champions League Quarter-finals second leg match.

== Awards ==
=== Players ===
No.	Pos.	Player	Award	Source
2	DF	(Germany) Antonio Rüdiger	2021 FIFA Club World Cup Final Man of the Match	
2	DF	(Germany) Antonio Rüdiger	2021–22 UEFA Champions League Team of the Season	
5	MF	(Italy) Jorginho	IFFHS Men's World Team of the Year 2021	
5	MF	(Italy) Jorginho	FIFA FIFPro Men's World11 2021	
6	DF	(Brazil) Thiago Silva	2021 FIFA Club World Cup Golden Ball	
7	MF	(France) N'Golo Kanté	IFFHS Men's World Team of the Year 2021	
7	MF	(France) N'Golo Kanté	FIFA FIFPro Men's World11 2021	
8	MF	(Croatia) Mateo Kovačić	Premier League Goal of the Month (January)	
8	MF	(Croatia) Mateo Kovačić	Chelsea Goal of the Season	
16	GK	(Senegal) Édouard Mendy	The Best FIFA Goalkeeper 2021	
19	MF	(England) Mason Mount	Chelsea Player of the Year	
28	DF	(Spain) César Azpilicueta	IFFHS Men's World Team of the Year 2021	
68	MF	(England) Harvey Vale	Chelsea Academy Player of the Year	

=== Manager ===
Manager	Award	Source
(Germany) Thomas Tuchel	Premier League Manager of the Month (October)	
(Germany) Thomas Tuchel	IFFHS Men's World's Best Club Coach 2021	
(Germany) Thomas Tuchel	IFFHS Men's World Team Coach of the Year 2021	
(Germany) Thomas Tuchel	The Best FIFA Men's Coach 2021	

=== Club ===
Award	Source
2021 UAE FIFA Fair Play Award	

== See also ==
- 2021–22 in English football
- List of Chelsea F.C. seasons
