= Clearlake Capital =

American private equity firm based in Santa Monica

Clearlake Capital Group, L.P.
- Type: Private
- Industry: Private equity
- Founded: 2006; 20 years ago
- Founders: Steven Chang; Behdad Eghbali; José E. Feliciano
- Headquarters: 233 Wilshire Blvd, Santa Monica, California, U.S.
- AUM: US$185 billion (2025)
- Number of employees: 500 (2025)
- Subsidiaries: WhiteStar Asset Management
- Website: clearlake.com

Clearlake Capital Group, L.P. is an American private equity firm founded in 2006 that focuses on the technology, industrial and consumer sectors. The firm has $185 billion of assets under management and is headquartered in Santa Monica, California, with offices in Dallas, London, Dublin, Luxembourg, Abu Dhabi, New York and Singapore. In 2022, the firm was a part of an investor consortium named BlueCo that purchased Chelsea F.C.

== Background ==
Clearlake Capital was founded in 2006 by Steven Chang, Behdad Eghbali and José E. Feliciano. The strategy was to shift between buyouts and distressed securities depending on economic conditions. This allowed the firm to take advantage of the 2008 financial crisis to acquire distressed securities and then sell them for a profit after recovery.

In 2015, Chang left the firm leaving Eghbali and Feliciano as the remaining managing partners.

In May 2018, Clearlake sold a minority stake of up to 20% of its shares to Dyal Capital, Petershill Partners and Landmark Partners. The purpose of the sale was to fund the creation of a credit unit.

In June 2020, Clearlake acquired a majority interest in WhiteStar Asset Management from Pine Brook Road Partners. WhiteStar Asset Management serves as the credit platform of Clearlake.

In May 2022, Clearlake became the biggest user of "General partner-led Private-equity secondary markets".

In September 2024, Clearlake acquired Natixis' pan-European private credit business MV Credit.

In May 2025, Clearlake launched Clearlake Credit, which underwrites investments up to $1 billion across private and liquid credit, and which is expected to triple the firm's credit asset base by 2030.

In June 2026, Clearlake completed the acquisition of investment management firm Pathway Capital Management, in a deal valued at nearly $1 billion. Pathway expanded Clearlake's offering in the private-wealth market. The firm also closed its 8th flagship fund with $14.8 billion, including co-investments and separately managed accounts, which the Wall Street Journal called one of the largest funds in recent years.

== Investments ==
=== Consumer ===
In 2014, Clearlake acquired the women's clothing company Ashley Stewart for $18 million after it had recently filed for bankruptcy. After the company underwent significant restructuring including cost-cutting, Clearlake sold the company to Invus Group for more than $140 million in 2016.

=== Sports ===
On May 30, 2022, an investor consortium named BlueCo, co-led by Clearlake and Todd Boehly, acquired Chelsea F.C. for $3 billion. Clearlake, which owns about 60% of Chelsea F.C., shares joint control and equal governance of the club with Boehly.

On September 16, 2026, Chelsea announced that Clearlake Capital acquired the ownership interest of Todd Boehly and Mark Walter’s ownership interest and therefore acquire full control of the Club.

=== Industrials ===
In March 2022, Clearlake acquired Intertape Polymer Group for $2.6 billion, taking the company private.

=== Tech and software ===
In 2015, Clearlake took a controlling stake in Syncsort. In 2016, Clearlake took a controlling stake in Vision Solutions. In 2017, Clearlake sold both companies to Centerbridge Partners for $1.26 billion and were merged. In 2020, the merged company rebranded to Precisely. In 2021, Clearlake and TA Associates reacquired Precisely for $3.5 billion.

Following the acquisition, Clearlake combined Endurance's Web Presence division with Web.com to form Newfold Digital, a global web presence and domain name registration market leader.

In October 2021, the firm acquired Cornerstone OnDemand, a NASDAQ-listed software company, for $5.2 billion and took the company private.

In December 2023, Clearlake announced it would take Alteryx private in a deal valued at $4.4 billion.

In October 2024, Clearlake acquired Black Duck Software for $2.1 billion.

In August 2025, the firm acquired Dun & Bradstreet for $7.7 billion and took the company private.
