= Behdad Eghbali =

Iranian–American businessman (born 1976)

- Born: May 6, 1976 (age 50); Rasht , Iran
- Education: University of California, Berkeley (BS)
- Occupation: Businessman
- Title: Co-founder and managing partner, Clearlake Capital
- Spouse: Julia Harris

Behdad Eghbali (Persian: بهداد اقبالی; born May 6, 1976) is an Iranian–American billionaire businessman and co-founder and managing partner of Clearlake Capital investment firm. As of May 2026, Forbes estimated his net worth at US$3.9 billion. Eghbali was first included in the Forbes 400 and Forbes Billionaires lists in 2021.

== Early life ==
Eghbali was born in Rasht , Iran and moved to the United States with his family when he was a child.

He graduated from the Haas School of Business at the University of California, Berkeley, with a bachelor's degree in business administration.

== Career ==
Eghbali began his career in investment banking in the technology group at Morgan Stanley and later joined San Francisco-based private equity firm TPG Capital, where he focused on buyouts and turnarounds.

In 2006, Eghbali and José E. Feliciano co-founded Clearlake Capital, described by Financial Times in 2022 as "one of the fastest-growing buyout firms in the world".

In May 2022, a consortium of investors co-led by Clearlake acquired Chelsea Football Club for GB£2,300,000,000 (equivalent to £2,610,600,794 in 2025). After the deal, Clearlake owned about 60% of the club. Among consortium members, Eghbali is considered among the most visible owners.

Eghbali is on the boards of several Clearlake portfolio companies, including Chelsea Football Club, Confluence, Constant Contact, Cornerstone OnDemand, DigiCert, Diligent, EagleView, Ivanti, Newfold Digital, Perforce, and Quest.

In May 2025, Eghbali and his partner José E. Feliciano launched Clearlake Credit from previous acquisitions of MV Credit Partners and WhiteStar Asset Management.

In November 2025, Eghbali and Feliciano’s Clearlake acquired Pathway Capital Management, which established Clearlake as one of the largest private equity firms by assets. In 2025, Eghbali and the firm have reported directing over 400 investments and US$90 billion in assets under management.

== Personal life ==
Eghbali is married to Julia Harris, and lives in Los Angeles, California. He is on the boards of nonprofits, including his family's Noor Foundation.

In 2024, Eghbali paid GB£56 million for a penthouse in Grosvenor Square in London's Mayfair district.
