= BlueCo =

British-based holding company

- Type: Holding company
- Industry: Sports; Sports services
- Founded: 2022
- Founder: Clearlake Capital; Hansjörg Wyss
- Key people: Behdad Eghbali; José E. Feliciano
- Subsidiaries: Chelsea (100%); Strasbourg (100%)

BlueCo is a consortium led by Clearlake Capital and Hansjörg Wyss. The group was formed as the investment vehicle for the takeover of Premier League football club Chelsea in 2022, later becoming a multi-club ownership group. Its name is derived from the home colour of Chelsea, its flagship football club, and it acts as the club's parent company.

== Ownership ==
Although the consortium was publicly fronted by Todd Boehly, Clearlake Capital is the majority shareholder in BlueCo. Clearlake's co-founders, Behdad Eghbali and José E. Feliciano, represent the firm's controlling interest in the consortium, while Boehly and other investors, including Mark Walter and Hansjörg Wyss, held minority stakes.

On 16 September 2026, Chelsea announced that Clearlake Capital acquired the ownership interest of Todd Boehly. Hansjörg Wyss remained an important stakeholder and partner in the ownership group. As part of the transition, Clearlake also acquired Mark Walter’s ownership interest and therefore acquired full control of the Club. Todd Bohely stepped down as Chairman after his four-year tenure.

== History ==
Founded in 2022, BlueCo is a consortium that purchased Chelsea in 2022. It was led by Todd Boehly, chairman and CEO of Eldridge Industries, and Clearlake Capital, and it also included Hansjörg Wyss, founder of the Wyss Foundation, and Mark Walter, co-founder and CEO of Guggenheim Partners. Walter and Boehly are owners of the Los Angeles Dodgers and the Los Angeles Sparks. BlueCo acquired Ligue 1 football club Strasbourg a year later to start a multi-club ownership .

On 16 September 2026, Chelsea announced that Clearlake Capital acquired the ownership interest of Todd Boehly and Mark Walter. Hansjörg Wyss remains an important stakeholder and partner in the ownership group. Todd Bohely stepped down as Chairman after his four-year tenure. Boehly, Walter and Hansjörg Wyss all resigned as directors from Chelsea and Blueco.

Location of BlueCo clubs

== Owned clubs ==
BlueCo owns football clubs in England and France:

Club	Country	Ownership stake	Year acquired	League	Notes
Chelsea	England	100%	2022	Premier League	Flagship club
Strasbourg	France	100%	2023	Ligue 1	Multi-club ownership expansion

=== Chelsea ===
In March 2022, former Chelsea owner, Russian businessman Roman Abramovich, was sanctioned by Western governments in response to the 2022 Russian invasion of Ukraine. As a result, the Premier League disqualified Abramovich as a club director, and he was forced to put the club up for sale.

On 7 May 2022, Chelsea confirmed that terms had been agreed for a new ownership group to acquire the club. The group later known as BlueCo was led by Todd Boehly, chairman and CEO of Eldridge Industries, and Clearlake Capital, it also included Hansjörg Wyss, founder of the Wyss Foundation, and Mark Walter, co-founder and CEO of Guggenheim Partners. Walter and Boehly are owners of the Los Angeles Dodgers, the Los Angeles Lakers, and the Los Angeles Sparks.

On 25 May 2022, the British government approved BlueCo's £4.25 billion takeover of Chelsea. The transaction received all necessary approvals from the UK government, the Premier League, and other authorities and was completed on 30 May 2022. After the takeover, BlueCo promised to commit £1.75 billion in further investment in the club's home stadium Stamford Bridge, the academy, the women's team, the academy and women's team's home stadium Kingsmeadow and the Chelsea Foundation.

As of November 2025, £2.35 billion of the proceeds intended to be spent in Ukraine were still frozen due to a legal dispute between Abramovich and the Government of Jersey. This was due to the Royal Court of Jersey ruling that raids on premises owned by Abramovich had been unlawful, and that Government of Jersey records linked to the original investigation had been deleted despite Abramovich having obtained their legal disclosure. The court described the behaviour of the Government of Jersey as "extreme", and legal actions continue. The court has allowed Abramovich to introduce claims of conspiracy against the Government of Jersey.

On 16 September 2026, Chelsea announced that Clearlake Capital acquired the ownership interest of Todd Boehly and Mark Walter. Hansjörg Wyss remains an important stakeholder and partner in the ownership group. Todd Bohely stepped down as Chairman after his four-year tenure. Boehly, Walter and Whyss all resigned as directors from Chelsea and Blueco.

=== Strasbourg ===
On 22 June 2023, BlueCo reached an agreement to become shareholders of French club Strasbourg. The agreement would see BlueCo invest in Strasbourg's first teams and academy. It was reported that the consortium had close to a 100% ownership stake in the club, having paid €75 million.

=== Players and managers transfer during BlueCo era ===
Below are the players and managers transfer between both clubs during BlueCo era.

==== From Chelsea to Strasbourg ====
Date	Name	Fee
8 August 2023	(Brazil) Ângelo Gabriel	Loan
2 February 2024	(Brazil) Andrey Santos	Loan
11 August 2024	(United States) Caleb Wiley	Loan
16 August 2024	(Portugal) Diego Moreira	£1,700,000
30 August 2024	(Serbia) Đorđe Petrović	Loan
12 July 2025	(France) Mathis Amougou	£12,000,000
28 July 2025	(Belgium) Mike Penders	Loan
30 July 2025	(England) Ishé Samuels-Smith	£6,500,000
31 July 2025	(Ecuador) Kendry Páez	Loan
1 August 2025	(Senegal) Mamadou Sarr	Loan
1 September 2025	(England) Ben Chilwell	Free
2 February 2026	(Argentina) Aarón Anselmino	Loan
2 February 2026	(Ivory Coast) David Datro Fofana	Loan
3 August 2026	(England) Genesis Antwi	Loan
11 August 2026	(Denmark) Filip Jörgensen	Loan
24 August 2026	(England) Omari Kellyman	£5,100,000
1 September 2026	(Portugal) Dário Essugo	Loan
1 September 2026	(Brazil) Deivid Washington	£6,860,000

==== From Strasbourg to Chelsea ====
Date	Name	Fee
9 June 2025	(Senegal) Mamadou Sarr	£11,800,000
1 September 2025	(England) Ishé Samuels-Smith	£6,500,000
6 January 2026	(England) Liam Rosenior (manager)	Undisclosed
1 July 2026 (Note: Completed on 12 September 2025 and became official in Summer 2026)	(Netherlands) Emmanuel Emegha	£22,000,000
2 August 2026	(Argentina) Valentín Barco	£34,000,000
