= Petershill Partners =

Investment company

- Company type: Private
- Industry: Private Equity
- Founded: 2007; 19 years ago
- Headquarters: London, United Kingdom
- Products: Alternative investments
- AUM: $8.5 billion (2021)
- Website: www.petershillpartners.com

Petershill Partners is a British investment company specialising in alternative investments. Investors in the business are able to participate, through minority investments, in the profits of large private equity and hedge funds.

== History ==
The company was established by Goldman Sachs in 2007. Between its inception and its initial public offering (IPO) in September 2021, it raised and invested US$8.5 billion in funds. However, in the immediate aftermath of its IPO the company lost nearly 10% of its value.

In September 2025, after indicating dissatisfaction with its own share performance and valuation, the company announced that it would delist from the London Stock Exchange.
