= Confluence (company) =

Investment management software company

- Type: Private
- Industry: Fund administration Software
- Founded: 1991
- Headquarters: Pittsburgh, Pennsylvania
- Key people: Mark Evans; Chris Evans; Kathleen Keenan; Todd Moyer
- Website: confluence.com

Confluence (Confluence Technologies) is a software firm that provides back-office automation systems to the investment management industry. The company was founded in 1991, and aims to lead the "DataTech evolution" with "a vision ... [of] instantaneously transforming data into knowledge and delivering it to the world." According to the company's website, Confluence technology is in use by eight of the top 10 global service providers, and all of the top 10 global asset managers have business processes automated through Confluence.

Confluence is headquartered in Pittsburgh, Pennsylvania. In 2017 it moved into new headquarters in Nova Place, located in Pittsburgh's Allegheny Center neighborhood. Confluence lists other international locations in Cape Town, Frankfurt, Ho Chi Minh City, London, Luxembourg, Milan, Montreal, Paris, Sydney and Toronto.

Confluence was founded in 1991 by Mike Schiller and Mark Evans. Schiller left the company in 1997 and Evans currently serves as Chairman, CEO and President of the company.

Confluence is privately owned. In 2018, TA Associates completed a majority investment in Confluence. As part of the transaction, Polaris Venture Partners sold its stake in the company.

== Products and services ==
The Confluence platform features regulatory reporting, investor communications, and performance and analytics solutions and supports a wide array of fund types – including mutual funds, ETFs, alternative investments, institutional portfolios and UCITS funds.

=== Partnerships ===
- In 2018, MSCI announced that it is adjusting its data and analytics for integration with Confluence's Regulatory Reporting.
- As of 2018, ICE Data Services and Confluence are partnering to help asset managers comply with SEC Regulations, with ICE Data Services focusing on market data and analytics, and Confluence applying its Regulatory Reporting platform.
- In June 2023, Confluence entered into a strategic partnership with Arcesium to launch an integrated data management and analytics offering for buy-side performance, risk, and regulatory reporting. It combines StatPro with Arcesium’s cloud-native Financial Data Stack.

== Growth and acquisitions ==
Confluence acquired California-based data management company, Data Agent, an alternative investment industry data and reporting solutions leader, in 2013.

In December 2014, Confluence announced the acquisition of Belgium-based data solutions provider, Orfival, increasing the breadth of Confluence offerings with new capability in performance risk analytics and attribution.

In October 2019, Confluence acquired UK portfolio analytics company StatPro for £161.1 million.

== Awards and recognition ==
In 2016 and 2017, Confluence won the "Best Use of Agile Methodology" at the American Financial Technology Awards (AFTAs).

In 2017, Confluence was awarded the "Best Data Management Solution" at the 2017 Mutual Fund Service and Technology Awards.
