= Arcesium =

American financial technology company

- Industry: Financial technology
- Founded: March 2015; 11 years ago in New York, U.S.
- Founder: D. E. Shaw & Co.
- Headquarters: New York, U.S.
- Key people: Gaurav Suri
- Number of employees: 700 (2018)
- Website: www.arcesium.com

Arcesium is a financial technology and software-enabled services company that provides post-trade operations and enterprise data management tools to asset managers, hedge funds, banks, and allocators. Its cloud-native products operate on a Software-as-Service (SaaS) model.

The firm was launched in 2015 as an independently operated joint venture of the D. E. Shaw group with additional backing from Blackstone Multi-Asset Investing (BXMA).

Arcesium is headquartered in New York City and maintains offices in the U.K. and Portugal and a large presence in India where it operates from three locations in Hyderabad, Bengaluru, and Gurugram.

== History ==
D. E. Shaw launched Arcesium in March 2015 to commercialize technology and services supporting investment managers’ post-trade activities. The D.E. Shaw group and Blackstone Alternative Asset Management its first clients. In 2018, J.P. Morgan’s Securities Services business expanded its use of Arcesium technology for alternative fund administration. In January 2020, J.P. Morgan then made a strategic investment in the company.

The company established a London office in September 2020 to serve European clients, followed by a Lisbon office announced in July 2024.

== Products and services ==
Arcesium’s offerings center on post-trade operations, data management, and adjacent middle- and back-office workflows for buy-side firms. Users of Arcesium’s products, including those in the role of designated market makers, describe the platform as supporting processes after execution across multiple asset classes and geographies.

In April 2023, the company launched Aquata, a cloud-native data platform for integrating and managing investment data across client types. In July 2024, Arcesium branded and packaged its existing post-investment tools as Opterra, a platform that unifies operational data and workflows throughout the investment lifecycle. Workflows include reconciliation and portfolio analytics, treasury and collateral activities, investor accounting, regulatory reporting, and private-markets operations.

== Leadership ==
Gaurav Suri is the chief executive officer. Institutional Investor profiled Suri’s role in the company’s launch and included him in its Trading Technology 40 list.
