= Pathway Capital Management =

Investment firm based in California

Pathway Capital Management LP
- Type: Private
- Industry: Investment management
- Founded: 1991; 35 years ago
- Founders: Douglas Le Bon; James Reinhardt; Karen Jakobi
- Headquarters: Irvine, California, U.S.
- Number of employees: 235 (2024)
- Website: www.pathwaycapital.com

Pathway Capital Management is an American private markets firm headquartered in Irvine California. Outside the U.S., it has offices in Europe and Asia-Pacific.

The majority of the firm's assets are in private fund of funds strategies for institutional investors. In 2020, Preqin ranked the company as the fifth-largest fund of funds globally with $62 billion in assets under management.

== Background ==
Pathway was founded in 1991 by several partners from Wilshire Associates. Le Bon who was one of the co-founders grew a practice helping pension funds invest in private markets while at Wilshire Associates. Pathway initially started as a private equity consultant that would advise pension funds on what to invest in. Early clients includes CalSTRS which it won a contract partially by charging lower fees than its peers.

In October 2006, Pathway halted its consulting services as it moved into the more lucrative investment management business where it could directly manage fund of funds accounts instead. Pathway informed the Los Angeles County Employees Retirement Association and Massachusetts Pension Reserves Investment Management Board that it would not rebid on its private equity consulting contracts because it no longer worked on advisory accounts. Pathway would focus on building a specialty funds business, in which it manages a specific private equity fund of funds-type arrangement with a single, large institutional investor.

Pathway charges a management fee based on the net asset values of their funds during their extended terms. During the initial terms, it charges management fee on their invested capital.

In November 2025, Clearlake Capital agreed to acquire Pathway for approximately $1 billion; following the acquisition, the combined group will manage $185 billion. The transaction was completed in June 2026.
