= Confluence (journal) =

- Discipline: Graduate liberal studies
- Language: English
- Edited by: Steven A. Burr

Publication details
- Former name(s): Journal of Graduate Liberal Studies
- History: 1995-present
- Publisher: Association of Graduate Liberal Studies Programs (United States)
- Frequency: Biannually

Standard abbreviations
- ISO 4: Confluence

Indexing
- ISSN: 1933-0057
- LCCN: 2006214368
- OCLC no.: 402816617
- Journal of Graduate Liberal Studies
- ISSN: 1082-6246

Links
- Journal homepage

Confluence: The Journal of Graduate Liberal Studies is an academic journal covering liberal studies that is published by the Association of Graduate Liberal Studies Programs. It was established in 1995 as the Journal of Graduate Liberal Studies and obtained its current name in 2006. The journal publishes both non-fiction and fiction, including essays, short stories, poetry, creative nonfiction, and visual arts. The editor-in-chief is Steven A. Burr (Loyola University Maryland).
