= Confluence (convention) =

Annual science fiction convention in Pennsylvania, US

Confluence is an annual science fiction convention that has been occurring in Pittsburgh since 1988.

== History ==
The ninth annual convention garnered over 400 science fiction fans in 1996. The original name was derived from the meaning of confluence, a gathering, and the fact that Pittsburgh is located at the confluence of three rivers.

The event has been organized by the Pittsburgh Area Real Time Science Fiction Enthusiasts Club (PARSEC).

In 2020, in response to the COVID-19 pandemic in the United States, the convention was held virtually and called C'monfluence.

== Events ==
Confluence is a convention focused primarily on the literature and art of science fiction, fantasy, and horror. Events include panel discussions, talks, poetry readings, filk concerts, a video room, and more.
