= Bruce Buck =

American lawyer and executive (born 1946)

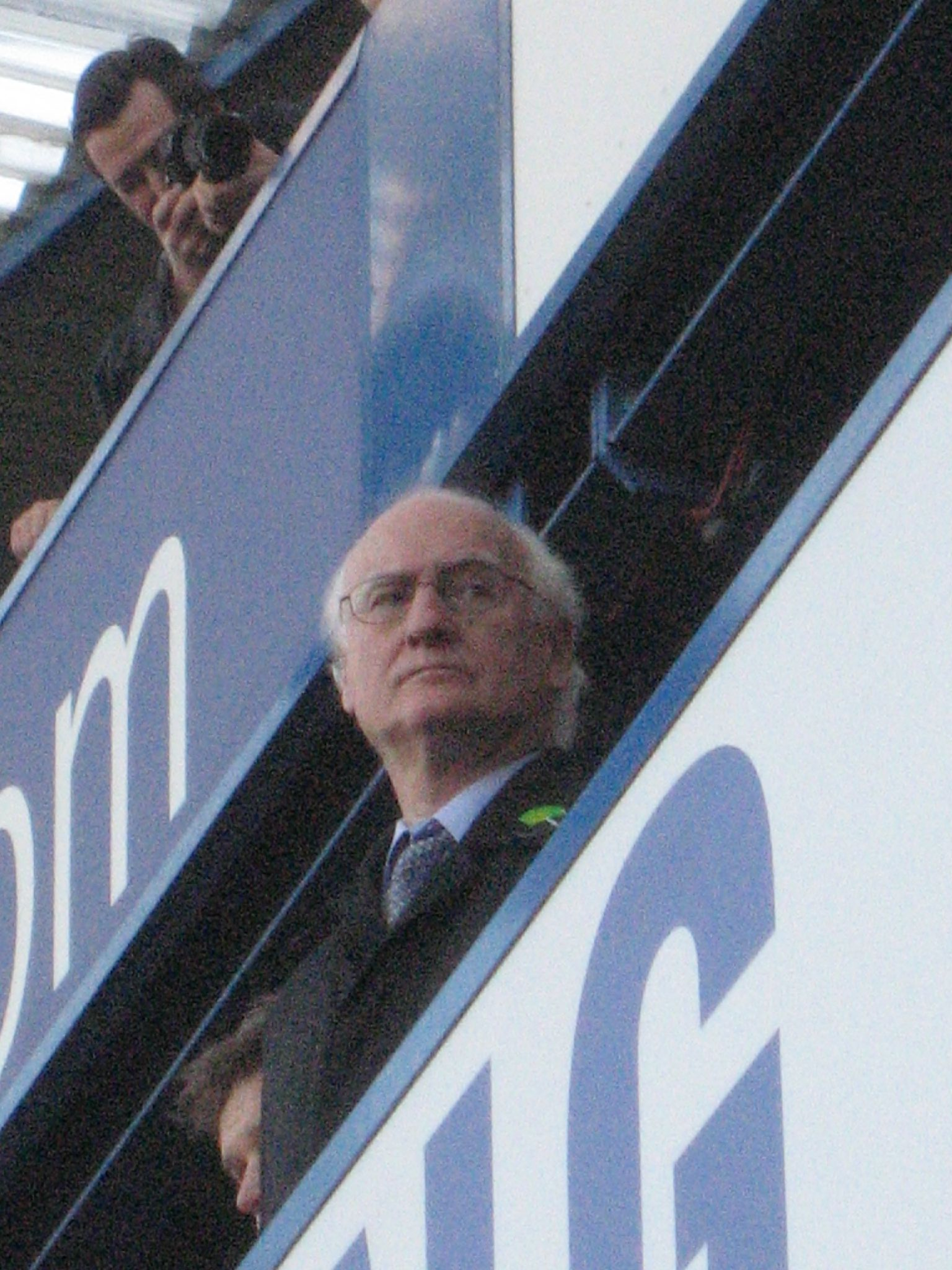
- Buck in 2008

Chairman of Chelsea
- In office March 2004 – 20 June 2022
- Preceded by: Ken Bates
- Succeeded by: Todd Boehly

Personal details
- Born: Bruce Michael Buck; March 12, 1946 (age 80) New York, United States
- Education: Colgate University (BA); Columbia Law School (JD)
- Profession: Lawyer
- Known for: Former chairman of Chelsea F.C.

Bruce Michael Buck (born March 12, 1946) is an American lawyer and founding managing partner of the London office of law firm Skadden, Arps, Slate, Meagher & Flom. He was also the chairman of Premier League football club Chelsea from 2004 until 2022. His practice areas are European mergers and acquisitions, project finance and capital markets.

== Early life and education ==
Buck received a B.A. degree from Colgate University and a Juris Doctor degree from Columbia Law School.

== Law career ==
Bruce Buck has been practising law in Europe since 1983. He left New York for England in 1983 for a “standard tour of duty” of two or three years with his previous law firm White & Case. Five years later he was headhunted by M&A specialists Skadden Arps to develop the firm's European practice from scratch and has stayed on ever since.

As the partner in charge of Skadden's European offices, his work includes a broad range of transactions in the capital markets area. Buck represents both European and non-European clients in a full range of crossborder financing transactions, generally in connection with equity offerings or high-yield and other debt financings.

== Chelsea F.C. ==
Buck's involvement with Chelsea began through his position as European head of the American law firm Skadden, Arps, Slate, Meagher & Flom. Skadden Arps specialises in mergers, acquisitions and capital market transactions, and Buck had personally done legal work on a number of acquisitions for the Russian company Siberian Oil (Sibneft), through which he came to advise Russian-Israeli billionaire Roman Abramovich, formerly the majority shareholder in Sibneft.

The £140 million acquisition of all of the outstanding shares of the London Stock Exchange-listed company Chelsea Village plc was his first experience of taking over a football club.

Buck remained in his role, despite the ownership change at Chelsea in May 2022. This changed on 20 June 2022, when the club announced that he would be stepping down from his role effective 30 June, although he would continue to work for the club as a Senior Advisor. He was succeeded by club co-owner Todd Boehly as chairman.

== Personal life ==
Buck has a wife and three sons. He took an interest in football after moving to London in the 1980s, and became a season ticket holder to Chelsea in 1991.

Business positions
Preceded by Ken Bates	Chelsea F.C. chairman 2004–2022	Succeeded by Todd Boehly
