= Confluence (shopping mall) =

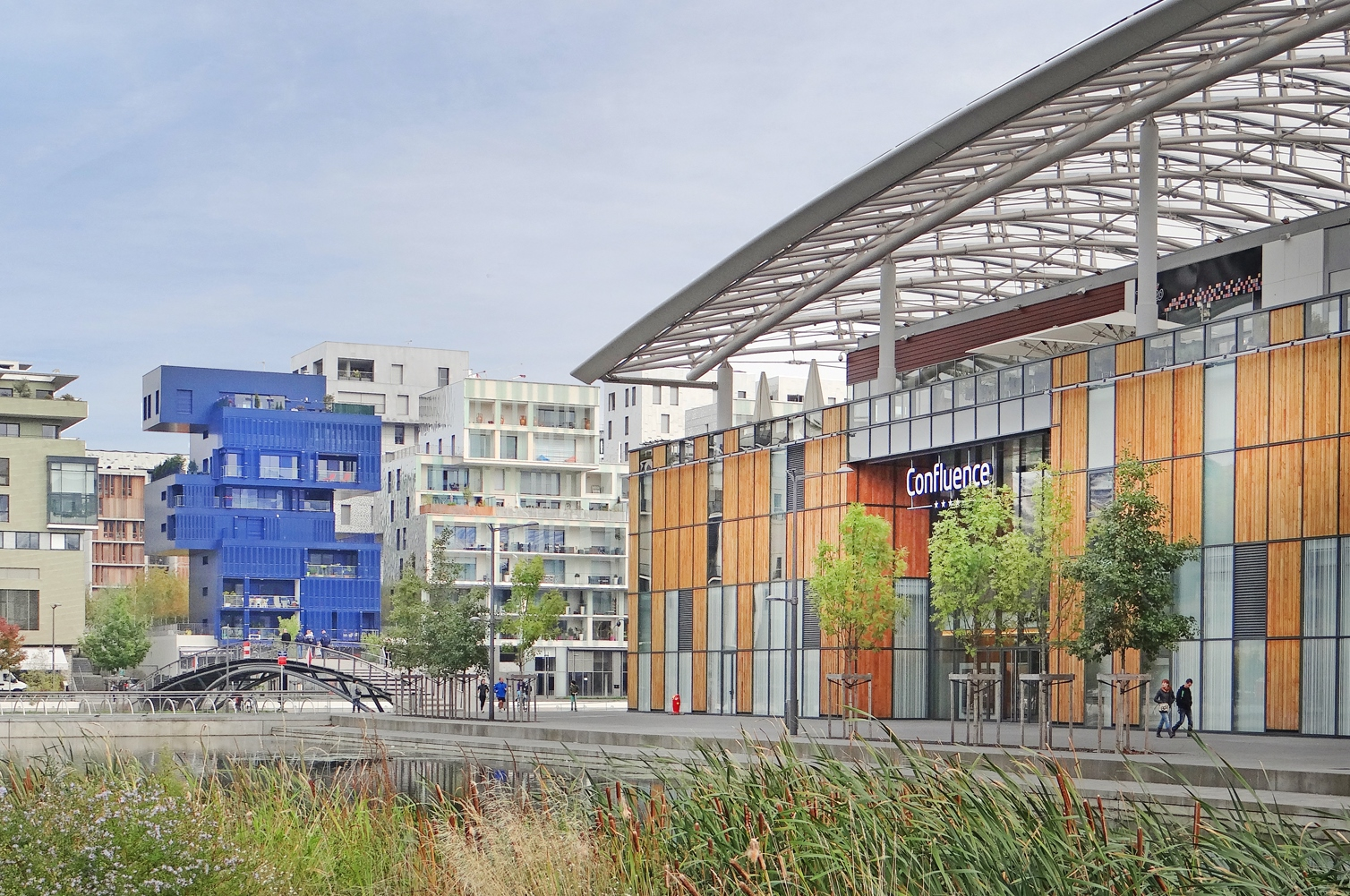
- Location: Lyon (2nd arrondissement), France
- Coordinates: 45.741405°N 4.815853°E
- Opened: 4 April 2012
- Owner: Unibail-Rodamco-Westfield
- Num. of stores: 102
- Floor area: 53,542 m^{2} (576,320 sq ft)
- Floors: 3
- Parking: 1,355 spaces
- Public transit: Hôtel de Région–Montrochet
- Website: www.confluence.fr

Confluence is a major shopping mall in the 2nd arrondissement of Lyon, France, opened on 4 April 2012. It is located in the modern neighbourhood of La Confluence at the south of the Presqu'île between Rhône and Saône rivers.

== Access ==
=== Public transportation ===
The shopping mall is served by tram lines T1 and T2 at the Hôtel de Région–Montrochet station and by bus S1.

== See also ==
- Musée des Confluences
