= Todd Boehly =

American businessman (born 1973)

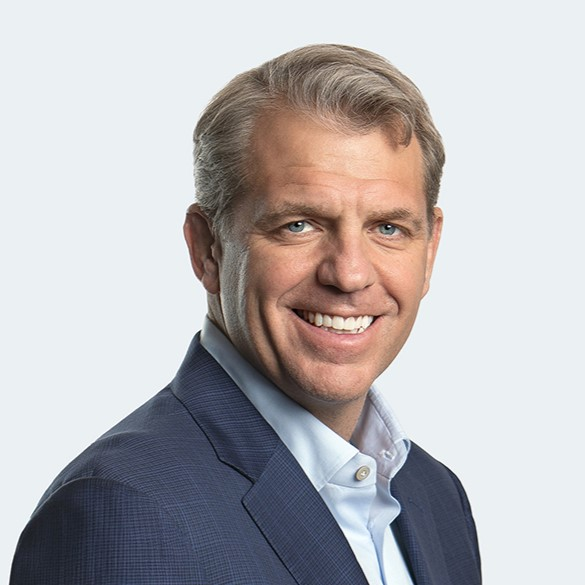
- Boehly in 2024

Chairman of Chelsea F.C.
- In office 20 June 2022 – 16 September 2026
- Preceded by: Bruce Buck
- Succeeded by: TBD

Co-owner of Chelsea F.C.
- In office 20 June 2022 – 16 September 2026
- Preceded by: Roman Abramovich
- Succeeded by: TBD

Co-owner of RC Strasbourg Alsace
- In office 22 June 2023 – 16 September 2026
- Preceded by: Marc Keller
- Succeeded by: TBD

Personal details
- Born: September 20, 1973 (age 53) Fairfax County, Virginia, U.S.
- Spouse: Katie Boehly
- Children: 3
- Education: College of William and Mary (BBA); London School of Economics (attended)

Todd L. Boehly (/ˈboʊliː/; born September 20, 1973) is an American businessman. He is the co-founder, chairman, chief executive officer (CEO) and controlling member of Eldridge Industries, a holding company headquartered in Miami, Florida. He is the former co-controlling owner and chairman of Premier League football club Chelsea, and former co-owner of Ligue 1 football club Strasbourg under BlueCo. As of March 2026, Forbes estimated his net worth at US$9.3 billion.

== Early life and education ==
Boehly, whose grandparents emigrated from Germany, was born in Fairfax County, Virginia. His father was an engineer and his mother was a first grade teacher. He has a younger sister. Boehly attended Landon School in Bethesda, Maryland, graduating in 1991.

Boehly graduated in 1996 from the College of William & Mary with a Bachelor of Business Administration degree in finance. After feeling overwhelmed with his college experience and not knowing exactly what he wanted to do, he visited his former geometry professor from Landon, Steve Sorkin, for advice. Boehly had an interest in finance and Sorkin advised him to move to London due to the potential opportunities to work in one of the largest global financial centers.

Taking Sorkin's advice on board, he moved to London on a special British Universities North America Club (BUNAC) visa and studied at the London School of Economics residing at Passfield Hall. Whilst at the London School of Economics, Boehly began working at Citibank and then at CS First Boston.

== Career ==
After graduating, Boehly became an analyst at Credit Suisse First Boston, structuring collateralized loan obligations. In 1999, he joined J.H. Whitney & Company where he helped restructure $600 million of Guggenheim Partners' collateralized loan obligations, and first began working with Guggenheim co-founder Mark Walter. In 2001, Boehly joined Guggenheim Partners and bought out J.H. Whitney's $1.5 billion credit business, folding it into Guggenheim. At Guggenheim, Boehly launched the firm's credit investing business, which grew to $60 billion, and assumed responsibility of its asset management business. He became president of Guggenheim in 2011.

In early 2013, Boehly led a deal between Time Warner Cable and the Los Angeles Dodgers of Major League Baseball to create SportsNet LA, a regional network to broadcast all Dodgers’ games and Dodgers-related programming. Broadcasting from the team-owned network began with the 2014 baseball season.

In 2026, it was reported that Boehly led a group proposing to purchase the sanctioned Russian oil company Lukoil. He previously contributed $2 million to PACs and political causes affiliated with Donald Trump.

=== Eldridge Industries ===
In 2015, Boehly bought some of the assets he had collected at Guggenheim, including The Hollywood Reporter, Dick Clark Productions, and Security Benefit to found Eldridge Industries, a private holding company which invests in various industries. In addition to its Miami headquarters, Eldridge Industries also has offices in Abu Dhabi, Atlanta, Beverly Hills, Chicago, Dallas, Greenwich, Connecticut, New York City, and London. It employed approximately 5,000 employees in the United States as of 2025. In 2023, Boehly appeared on CNBC to discuss Eldridge Industries' focus on credit management and scaling businesses in response to market conditions in the United States. In 2024, he made another appearance on CNBC to discuss growing activity in mergers and acquisitions as part of a shift towards market consolidation. In a 2025 Bloomberg interview, Boehly commented on opportunities in developing credit markets and industries in Asia, particularly Japan, Hong Kong, and China.

Boehly's asset management company Eldridge owns Security Benefit Life Insurance. In 2010, he visited Topeka, Kansas to lead Security Benefit's acquisition by Guggenheim and demutualization. While negotiating the acquisition of Security Benefit, Boehly stayed at The Eldridge Hotel, a historic hotel founded by the abolitionist Shalor Eldridge. He later spun Security Benefit out as a part of a new company which he named Eldridge Industries, and Security Benefit became a part of the asset manager Eldridge when it was founded in 2025. Eldridge Industries also owns Zinnia (formerly SE2), a technology platform for insurance companies. He invested in Clearcover Insurance, and DPL Financial Advisors, an RIA insurance network. DPL reached over $1 billion in annuity sales in 2022, which doubled in 2023. Eldridge Industries also owns a 10% interest in Blue Owl GP Stakes Fund III.

He helped to found Cain, a real estate firm co-owned by Eldridge Industries, Kennedy Wilson, and European real investment firm Blackbrook Capital. Blackbrook merged with Cain in 2024.

In 2024, the real estate investment firm Eldridge Acre Partners was formed in partnership with AECOM.

Through Eldridge Industries, Boehly has invested in technology, entertainment, sports, and consumer goods. Boehly has also invested in AI parking management company Metropolis Technologies, the largest parking company in North America. It has over 4,000 locations and processed over $5 billion in payments from 50 million customers as of 2025. The company's artificial intelligence platform is also used in retail, food service, hospitality, and aviation. He has also invested in digital delivery service Gopuff, which had raised $5 billion in total funding as of 2025 and was valued at $40 billion.

==== Eldridge ====
Boehly is the chairman of Eldridge, an asset manager and insurance holding company founded in 2025 with over $70 billion in assets under management. Several existing Eldridge Industries asset management and investment businesses were reconsolidated under Eldridge. In 2025, it opened an office in Singapore.

Eldridge is wholly owned by Eldridge Industries and includes the asset management division Eldridge Capital Management, and the insurance and retirement division Eldridge Wealth Solutions. Eldridge Wealth Solutions' holdings comprise Everly Life and Security Benefit Life Insurance, an insurer with $60 billion in assets. Security Benefit had a net income of $1.2 billion as of 2023, and issued an offering of $650 million in senior debt in 2024.

=== Sports ===
Boehly owns 20% of the Los Angeles Dodgers and is also a part owner of the Los Angeles Sparks. Under his ownership, the Dodgers won the 2020 and 2024 World Series, and their games have seen a rise in viewership. He is an owner of esports organization Cloud9. Boehly and Walter acquired a 27% stake in the Los Angeles Lakers from Philip Anschutz in 2021. At the time, the Lakers were third-highest valued team in the NBA, with an estimated value of $5.14 billion.

On 22 June 2023, Boehly acquired a majority stake in French Ligue 1 club Strasbourg for a reported fee of £65M through BlueCo.

Boehly has also invested in The St. James athletic facility in Springfield, Virginia, which is planned to be part of a network of sports training facilities.

As of 2026, Eldridge Industries and Arctos Partners manage a fund that invests in North American sports leagues and entertainment companies.

Boehly has commented on the professionalization of college sports and increasing demand for more sophisticated sports training programs. In an interview with CNBC, Boehly analyzed the use of experiential technologies including artificial intelligence, augmented reality, and virtual reality on audience participation in sports, and its impact on avenues of sports monetization such as sports betting.

=== Chelsea F.C. ===
In 2019, Boehly made an attempt to buy the English football club Chelsea for $3 billion, but the owner at the time, Russian billionaire Roman Abramovich, rejected the takeover bid. In March 2022, alongside Mark Walter, Hansjörg Wyss and Clearlake Capital, he launched a bid to buy the club from Abramovich, who had announced an intention to sell it amid the Russian invasion of Ukraine. Their consortium was later known as BlueCo. On May 6, 2022, Chelsea F.C. confirmed that the bid had been accepted by its owners and would be finalized by the end of the month. The bid was approved by both the UK and, because of Abramovich's Portuguese citizenship, the Portuguese government, the Premier League, and the European Union. On May 30, the takeover of the club was completed.

Boehly was named chairman and interim sporting director of Chelsea on June 20, 2022, after Bruce Buck stepped down. On January 9, 2023, Boehly stepped down as the interim sporting director of Chelsea.

The Guardian noted that Boehly is following his usual approach of taking an active role in new business operations during their first year, and then stepping back and deferring to "the experts" once they are in place. In May 2023, Boehly called the purchase of the team "a long-term project", commenting that "the fans are demanding, and they want to win. And we get that, we [also] want to win". In 2023, Chelsea partnered with Tempus Ex Machina to integrate additional features into the Chelsea mobile app, such as the ability to switch camera positions while watching livestreams of games, adjust the graphical interface and view highlights. In 2025, Chelsea won the FIFA Club World Cup.

On September 16, 2026, Chelsea announced that Clearlake Capital acquired the ownership interest of Boehly. Boehly stepped down as Chairman after his four-year tenure.

=== Media and entertainment ===
In 2012, Eldridge Industries provided seed funding for film company A24. The studio has been described as "an indie powerhouse" by Los Angeles Times, and has been nominated for 87 Academy Awards, of which it won 21. In 2023, it became the first studio in history to win the top six Academy Awards (Best Picture, Best Director, Best Actor, Best Actress, Best Supporting Actor, and Best Supporting Actress) in a single year.

In 2020, it was announced that Boehly formed a joint venture with Penske Media Corporation to manage publications, including Billboard, Rolling Stone, The Hollywood Reporter, Variety and Music Business Worldwide. The joint venture managed content such as television series, films and live events, and became the majority owner of South by Southwest in 2021. In 2023, Penske Media Corporation and Eldridge Industries renamed the joint venture Penske Media Eldridge, which also owns properties such as South by Southwest, Life Is Beautiful Music & Art Festival, and Dick Clark Productions.

Dick Clark Productions partnered with Spotify to relaunch the Billboard Music Awards as a digital event in 2023. That year, Dick Clark's New Year's Rockin' Eve, which is produced by Dick Clark Productions, was renewed with ABC through 2029.

Boehly led investments in fan engagement platform Laylo, Canadian influencer marketing and technology company, Viral Nation, and Fixated, a content creation management company.

Boehly is the largest investor in Larry Jackson's music company Gamma, followed by A24 and Apple. Gamma acquired music distribution platform Vydia, and expanded into Africa and the Middle East, opening headquarters in Lagos and Dubai.

==== Golden Globes ====
In 2021, Boehly was named the interim CEO of the Hollywood Foreign Press Association. In 2022, Eldridge Industries acquired the HFPA, and announced plans to create a for-profit entity to manage the Golden Globe Awards' intellectual property, as well as a nonprofit entity to manage the HFPA's philanthropic efforts.

Eldridge Industries and Dick Clark Productions acquired the assets, rights and properties of the Golden Globes in 2023, as part of the HFPA's dissolution. Under this deal, the non-profit Golden Globe Foundation was also formed to handle the philanthropic efforts of the former HFPA.

The 81st Golden Globe Awards aired on CBS on January 7, 2024, returning to its traditional time slot on the first Sunday of January. The show introduced two new awards categories, "Stand-up Comedy" and "Cinematic and Box Office Achievement", and six nominees per category, increasing from the previous five nominees. The broadcast was watched by over 9.4 million viewers, earning the show's highest ratings in years. The broadcast of the 83rd Golden Globes in 2026 received over 8.6 million viewers and 43 million impressions on social media, the highest level of online engagement in the awards' history. The 83rd Golden Globes added a new awards category: "Best Podcast".

== Boards ==
Boehly sits on the boards of Cain, Kennedy Wilson, PayActiv, Vivid Seats and CAIS, which launched the SaaS platform CAIS Solutions.

=== Reception ===
Boehly was listed on Los Angeles Business Journal's list of the 500 most influential people from 2017 to 2023. In 2022, he was included on the Forbes 400 list, and the Bloomberg 50, a list of the most influential people in global business. Boehly was featured on the cover of Forbes in 2024, as part of a feature on his investment, sports and entertainment empire. He was also included in Los Angeles Times' 2024 "LA Influential" list.

He is a frequent keynote speaker at symposiums, summits and economic forums.

== Personal life ==
Boehly met his wife Katie while he was studying at the College of William & Mary. They have three sons. Boehly and his wife helped found the Boehly Center for Excellence in Finance in 2014 at William & Mary's Raymond A. Mason School of Business via a multi-year gift. They also sponsor the yearly women's Stock Pitch and Leadership Summit at William & Mary. In 2020, Boehly and Katie committed funding to the construction of a new athletic complex and sports performance center at the college. They were honorary co-chairs of a $55 million campaign to fund William & Mary Athletics in 2021. In January 2021, Boehly partnered with William & Mary to produce a series of courses for students at the Boehly Center for Excellence in Finance.

Boehly is involved with various organizations, including Finding a Cure for Epilepsy and Seizures (FACES), the Brunswick School, the Prostate Cancer Foundation, and the Focused Ultrasound Foundation. He also supports the Milken Centre for Advancing the American Dream.

Business positions
Preceded by Bruce Buck	Chelsea chairman 2022–2026	Succeeded by Vacant
