= Chelsea Pitch Owners =

UK nonprofit organisation

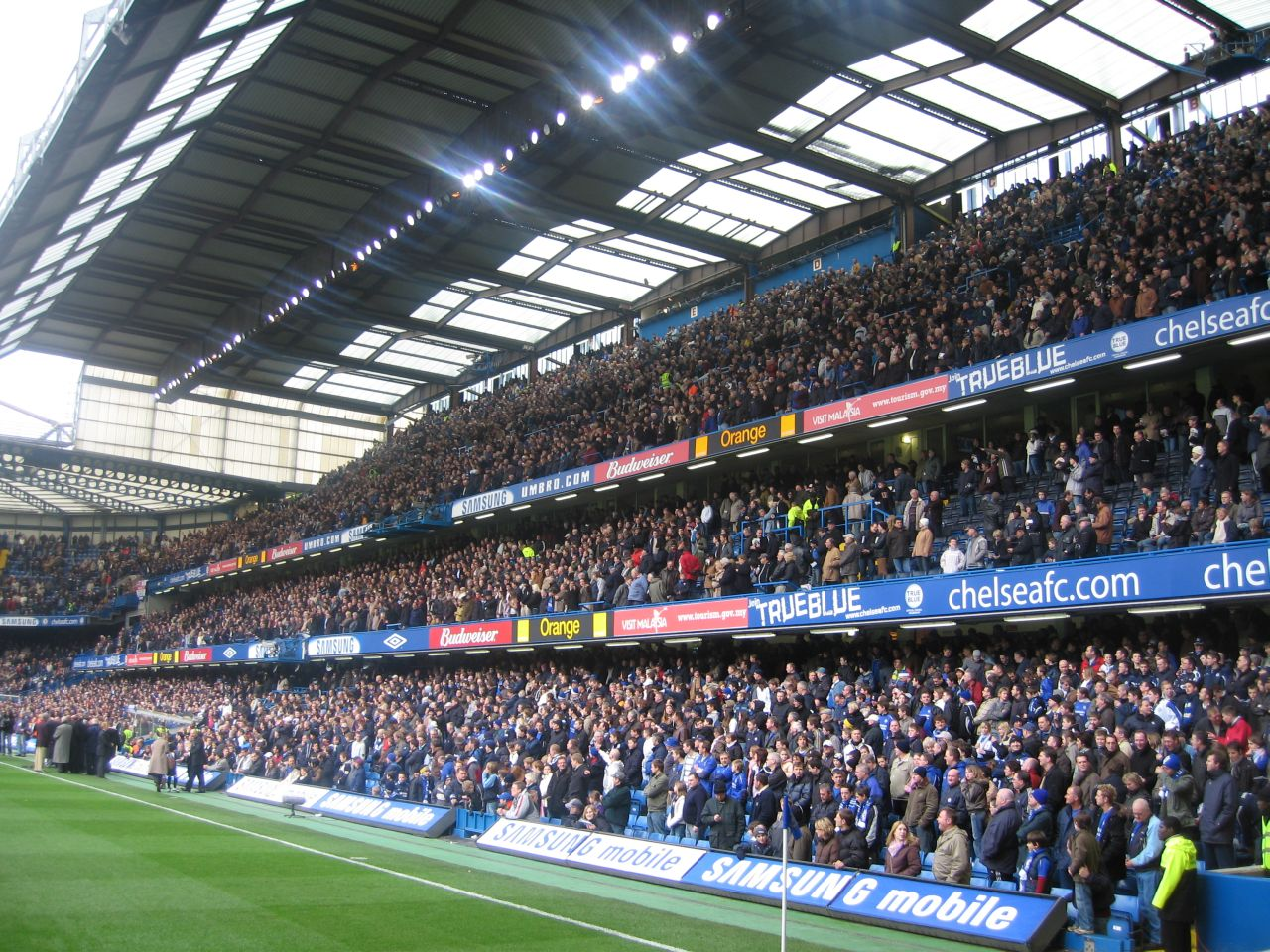
The East Stand. The cost of constructing this stand played a large part in the club's financial crisis.

Chelsea Pitch Owners plc is a nonprofit organisation which is part of Chelsea Football Club, tasked with the upkeep of the stadium. It owns both the freehold of the Stamford Bridge stadium and the naming rights of Chelsea Football Club.

== History ==
Chelsea suffered serious financial troubles during the 1970s and 1980s following a large-scale attempt to renovate Stamford Bridge. The financial crisis and a subsequent change of ownership at the club culminated in the sale of the club's freehold to property developers Marler Estates (and subsequently Cabra Estates). The move almost saw Chelsea lose the stadium.

The future of the stadium (and hence the club) was only secured in 1992, when the property developers were bankrupted by a market crash, allowing the then-chair Ken Bates to do a deal with their bankers and to regain control of the stadium for the football club. Following this, Chelsea Pitch Owners was created, and in 1997 it purchased the Stamford Bridge freehold, the turnstiles, the pitch and the Chelsea FC name with the aid of a non-recourse loan of £10 million from Chelsea Village plc, the parent company of the club. CPO in turn granted the club a 199-year lease on Stamford Bridge at a peppercorn rent.

== Organisation and ownership ==
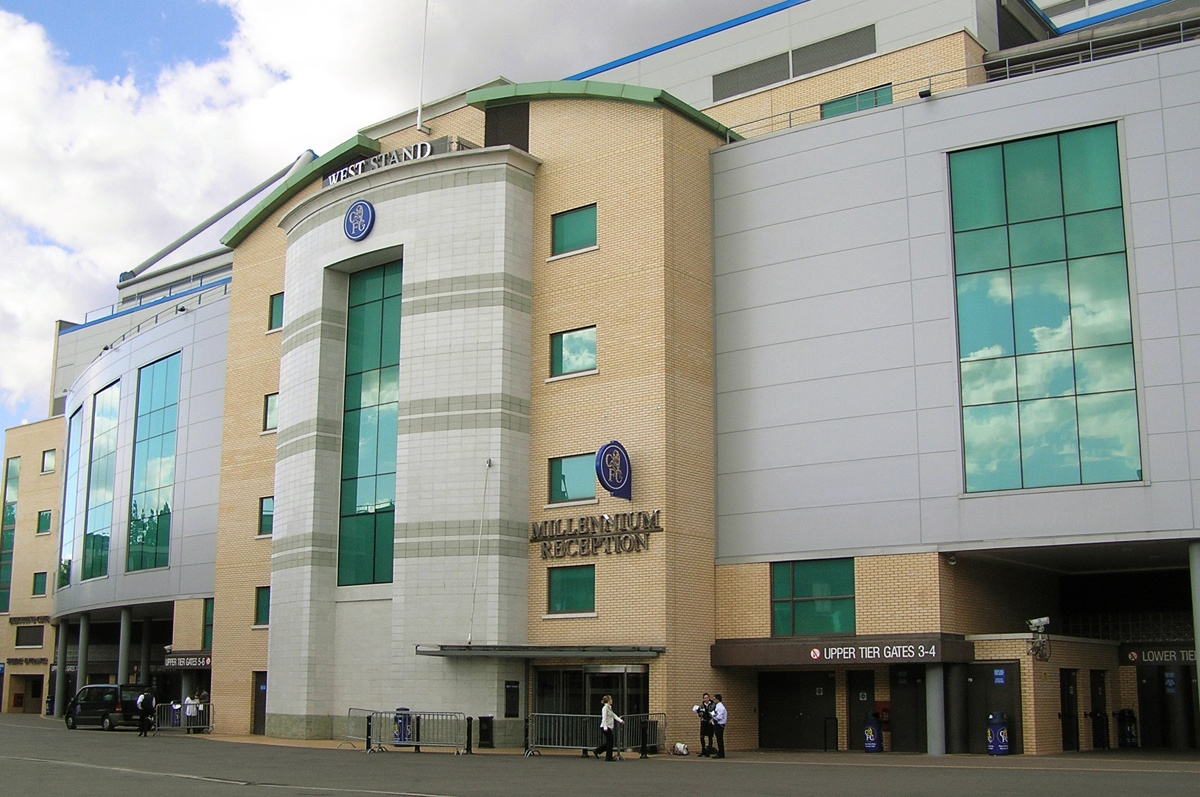
The entrance to the West Stand (2006)

In granting control of the freehold to Chelsea Pitch Owners, the intention was to ensure that Stamford Bridge could never again be sold to property developers. Irrespective of how many shares are owned by an individual, voting rights are limited to 100 per shareholder to prevent any one person or organisation gaining control of CPO.

CPO also owns the name Chelsea Football Club Ltd, which is licensed back to the club on condition that the first team play their home matches at Stamford Bridge. This means that should Chelsea move to another stadium in the future, they would not be able to use the name Chelsea Football Club without permission from 75% of CPO shareholders.

The company is a non-profit organisation and is not listed on any stock exchange. Its purpose is to raise the money needed to pay off the loan and then lease the freehold back to the club, on the strictly defined proviso that the ground may only be used for football purposes. Fans are encouraged to purchase shares to secure the club's future. As of 2023, around 23,000 CPO shares have been sold, and approximately £2 million of the debt has been paid off. Former club captain John Terry is the current president of the CPO. Terry also holds the position of president for Chelsea Women.

== Club proposal ==
On 3 October 2011 Chelsea Football Club made a proposal to buy back the freehold land (owned by CPO) on which the football stadium at Stamford Bridge sits, which would pave the way for a move to a new ground. Chelsea chairman Bruce Buck, said: "Chelsea should always be grateful to those who invested in CPO. We know only too well how close the club came to losing our home prior to the formation of CPO, but that threat has now gone under Mr Abramovich's ownership and with the CPO structure in place we cannot plan with certainty for the future. I hope all shareholders vote in favour of the proposal."

Chelsea chief executive Ron Gourlay said: "I am sure all Chelsea fans have enjoyed the football and success we have witnessed at Stamford Bridge since 2003 and Chelsea Football Club and Mr Abramovich are determined to ensure that the club continues to compete at the highest level of world football." He added: "We continue to look at options for expanding the Bridge and I should be clear that we have not identified a site for a new stadium elsewhere."

The proposal was brought in a general CPO meeting on 27 October 2011 but failed to pass as only 61.6% of the total votes were cast in favour of the proposal, below the 75% minimum requirement.

In May 2012, Chelsea Football Club confirmed that they had lodged a bid to buy the site of Battersea Power Station, with the possibility of the club relocating to a 60,000-seater capacity stadium. Chairman Bruce Buck did concede that there were "a number of hurdles to jump," including "winning the support of our fans, the CPO shareholders and local Wandsworth residents [near the Battersea site], as well as securing the approval of Wandsworth Council, the Greater London Authority and heritage authorities." The Battersea Power Station proposal did not proceed, with the site redeveloped for residential and commercial uses.

=== The Stamford Bridge Redevelopment Project ===
In December 2015 Chelsea announced intention to build a 60,000-seater stadium at Stamford Bridge to a design by Herzog & de Meuron. Planning permission was achieved in 2017, In May 2018, the club announced suspension of the rebuild due to the "unfavourable investment climate."

In July 2022 it was reported that the club's new owner Todd Boehly had appointed American architect Janet Marie Smith to oversee the renovation of the stadium. However, as of March 2025, no progress has been made with this.
