= Shadwell v Shadwell =

- Court: Court of Common Pleas
- Full case name: LANCELOT SHADWELL v CAYLEY SHADWELL AND ANOTHER, Executor and Executrix of Charles Shadwell, Deceased.
- Citations: [1860] EWHC CP J88, (1860) 9 CB (NS) 159

Court membership
- Judges sitting: Erle CJ, Byles J, Keating J

Keywords
- Consideration, pre-existing duty, third party

Shadwell v Shadwell [1860] EWHC CP J88 is an English contract law case, which held that it would be a valid consideration for the court to enforce a contract if a pre-existing duty was performed, so long as it was for a third party. It has been accepted into United States law.

== Facts ==
Shadwell was engaged to marry Ellen Nicole. His Uncle Charles promised £150 a year in a letter after the marriage. He wrote,

11 August 1838. Gray’s Inn.

My dear L,

I am glad to hear of your intended marriage with Ellen Nicholl, and, as I promised to assist you at starting, I am happy to tell you that I will pay to you 150l yearly during my life time and until your annual income from your profession of a chancery barrister shall amount to 600 guineas, of which your own admission will be the only evidence that I shall receive or require.

Your ever affectionate uncle, Charles Shadwell.

Uncle Charles died. Shadwell alleged that his Uncle had not paid in full before the death and claimed the outstanding money from his Uncle's estate. The estate refused to pay on the ground that Shadwell had given no consideration for the promise to pay the £150.

== Judgment ==
The Court of Common Pleas held that there was good consideration for the promise by the nephew marrying, despite the fact that the engagement had already happened when the promise was made. There was good consideration in performing a pre-existing contract, if it was with a third party.

Erle CJ said,

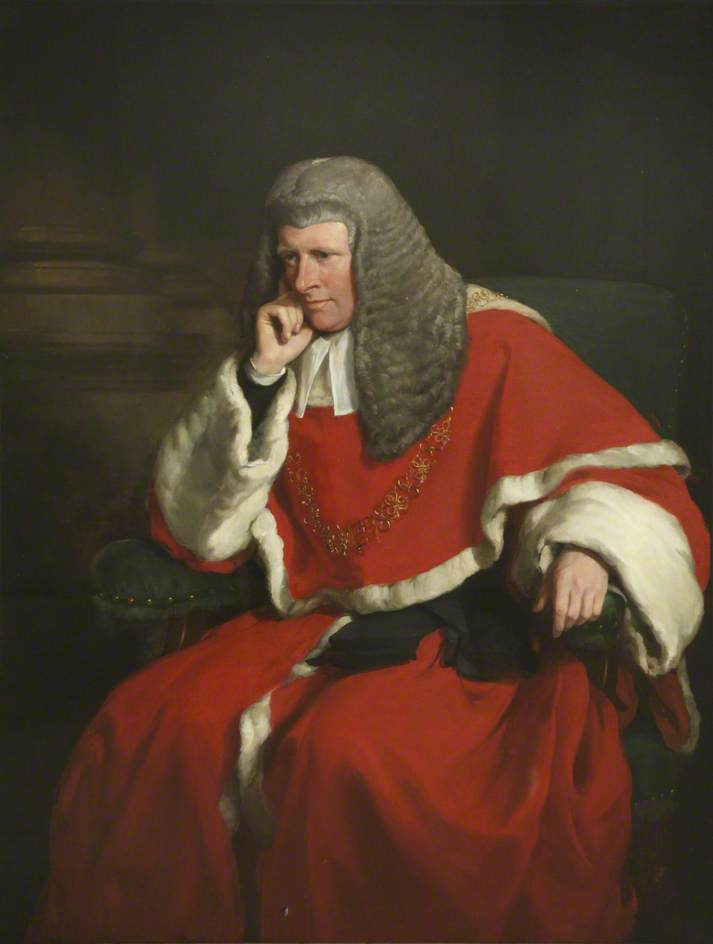
Sir William Erle

Now, do these facts shew that the promise was in consideration either of a loss to be sustained by the plaintiff or a benefit to be derived from the plaintiff to the uncle, at his, the uncle's, request? My answer is in the affirmative. First, do these facts shew a loss sustained by the plaintiff at his uncle's request? When I answer this in the affirmative, I am aware that a man's marriage with the woman of his choice is in one sense a boon, and in that sense the reverse of a loss: yet, as between the plaintiff and the party promising to supply an income to support the marriage, it may well be also a loss. The plaintiff may have made a most material change in his position, and induced the object of his affection to do the same, and may have incurred pecuniary liabilities resulting in embarrassments which would be in every sense a loss if the income which had been promised should be withheld; and, if the promise was made in order to induce the parties to marry, the promise so made would be in legal effect a request to marry.

Secondly, do these facts shew a benefit derived from the plaintiff to the uncle, at his request? In answering again in the affirmative, I am at liberty to consider the relation in which the parties stood and the interest in the settlement of his nephew which the uncle declares. The marriage primarily affects the parties thereto; but in a secondary degree it may be an object of interest to a near relative, and in that sense a benefit to him. This benefit is also derived from the plaintiff at the uncle's request. If the promise of the annuity was intended as an inducement to the marriage, and the averment that the plaintiff, relying on the promise, married, is an averment that the promise was one inducement to the marriage, this is the consideration averred in the declaration; and it appears to me to be expressed in the letter, construed with the surrounding circumstances.

Byles J dissented. In particular he disagreed on the factual question that the marriage was at the uncle's request.

Keating J agreed with Erle CJ.

== See also ==
- Chappell & Co Ltd v Nestle Co Ltd [1960] AC 87
- Hamer v Sidway 124 NY 538 (1891)
- White v Bluett (1853) 23 LJ Ex 36
- Hawes v Armstrong 1 N. C. 761, 1 Scott, 661, Tindall CJ
- Eastwood v Kenyon 11 Ad. & E. 438, 3 P. & D. 276
