= Re Wragg Ltd =

In re Wragg Ltd
- Court: Court of Appeal of England and Wales
- Citation: [1897] 1 Ch 796

Court membership
- Judges sitting: Lindley LJ; Smith LJ; Rigby LJ

Case opinions
- Lindley LJ, Smith LJ

Keywords
- Shares, capital, consideration

In re Wragg Ltd [1897] 1 Ch 796 is a UK company law case, also relevant for English contract law, concerning shares, and the rule that shares should be exchanged for consideration that is in some sense at least sufficient, not necessarily adequate.

== Facts ==
Mr Wragg and Mr Martin sold their omnibus and livery stable business to a newly incorporated company for £46,300. The company paid by issuing debentures and fully paid shares to Mr Wragg and Mr Martin. The liquidator of Wragg Ltd claimed that the company was (in return for the share issue) worth £18,000 less than the board had decided to pay.

== Judgment ==
Lindley LJ held that the transaction was wholly legitimate. He noted that Ooregum Gold Mining Co of India v Roper decided shares cannot be issued at a discount, or below their nominal value, and continued.

It has, however, never yet been decided that a limited company cannot buy property or pay for services at any price it thinks proper, and pay for them in fully paid-up shares. Provided a limited company does so honestly and not colourably, and provided that it has not been so imposed upon as to be entitled to be relieved from its bargain, it appears to be settled... that agreements by limited companies to pay for property or services in paid-up shares are valid and binding on the companies and their creditors... It is not law that persons cannot sell property to a limited company for fully paid-up shares and make a profit by the transaction. We must not allow ourselves to be misled by talking of value. The value paid to the company is measured by the price at which the company agrees to buy what it thinks it worth its while to acquire. Whilst the transaction is unimpeached, this is the only value to be considered.

Smith LJ concurred, saying if the consideration is ‘not clearly colourable nor illusory, then, in my judgment, the adequacy of the consideration cannot be impeached by a liquidator unless the contract can also be impeached’.

== See also ==
- UK company law
- Chappell & Co Ltd v Nestle Co Ltd [1960] AC 87
