= Chappell & Co Ltd v Nestle Co Ltd =

English contract law case

- Court: House of Lords
- Full case name: CHAPPELL AND COMPANY LIMITED and others v THE NESTLE COMPANY LIMITED and others
- Decided: 18 June 1959
- Citation: [1960] AC 87
- Transcript: UKHL 1

Court membership
- Judges sitting: Viscount Simonds, Lord Reid, Lord Tucker, Lord Keith of Avonholm, Lord Somervell of Harrow

Case opinions
- Lord Somervell

Keywords
- Consideration, adequacy, copyright

Chappell & Co Ltd v Nestle Co Ltd [1959] UKHL 1 is an important English contract law case, where the House of Lords confirmed the traditional doctrine that in order for a legal contract to be binding consideration must be sufficient but need not be adequate.

== Facts ==
Chappell & Co. owned the copyright to "Rockin' Shoes" (by The King Brothers). Nestlé was giving away records of it to people who sent in three wrappers from 6d chocolate bars, as well as 1s 6d. The Copyright Act 1956 s 8 said a 6.25% royalty needed to be paid on the "ordinary retail selling price" to the owners of copyrights. Nestle said 1s 6d was the ordinary retail selling price, but Chappell & Co argued that it should be more and sought an injunction for breach of CA 1956 s 8. In this way the question arose as to whether the wrappers constituted partial consideration for the records. Mr Justice Downjohn granted an injunction, the Court of Appeal (Lords Justices Jenkins and Ormerod; Lord Justice Romer dissenting) reversed his decision, and Chappell & Co appealed.

== See also ==
- Bret v JS (1600) Cro Eliz 756, love and affection not good consideration
- Evans v Llewellin (1787) 1 Cox CC 333, share of estate sale set aside on grounds of very low price
- Thomas v Thomas (1842) 2 QB 851, there must be sufficient consideration "in the eyes of the law"
- Shadwell v Shadwell [1860] EWHC CP J88, performing a pre-existing duty to a third party still good consideration, or that a request to perform an act already undertaken can be implied
- Fry v Lane (1888) 40 ChD 312, suggested that inadequate consideration not relevant
- In re Wragg Ltd [1897] 1 Ch 796, company law case, where Court of Appeal refused to impeach a share sale transaction alleged to have been at an undervalue
- Batsakis v. Demotsis, 226 S.W.2d 673 (1949), an American case in which the court held that a few drachma was good consideration
