= Peppercorn (law) =

Legal term

In legal parlance, a peppercorn is a metaphor for a very small cash payment or other nominal consideration, used to satisfy the requirements for the creation of a legal contract. It is featured in Chappell & Co Ltd v Nestle Co Ltd ([1960] AC 87), an important English contract law case where the House of Lords stated that "a peppercorn does not cease to be good consideration if it is established that the promisee does not like pepper and will throw away the corn". However, the cited passage is mere dicta, and not the basis for the decision.

== Function in contract law ==
In English law, and other countries with similar common law systems, a binding legal contract requires that each party must provide consideration. In other words, each party will give something of value to the other party for the contract to be considered binding. The situation is different under contracts within civil law jurisdictions because such nominal consideration can be categorised as a disguised gift.

However, in American law, courts will not generally inquire into the adequacy or relative value of the consideration provided by each party. So, if a contract calls for one party to give up something of great value, while the other party gives up something of much lesser value, then it will generally still be considered a valid contract, even though the exchange of value greatly favors one side. Courts, however, will reject "consideration" that was not truly bargained for. For example, in the 1904 case Fischer v. Union Trust Co., the Michigan Supreme Court held that the one dollar paid for the sale of real property did not constitute valuable consideration since the transaction had not been bargained for—a dollar was handed to a mentally incompetent "buyer" who then dutifully handed it to the "seller". The dollar was not considered real consideration, not because the dollar was too small an amount, but because it did not induce the seller to part with the property. Such promises that are motivated by love and affection are insufficient to constitute consideration.

So, in order for an essentially one-sided contract (such as a gift) to still be valid and binding, the contract will generally be written so that one side gives up something of value, while the other side gives a token sum—one pound, dollar, or literally one peppercorn. Peppercorn payments are sometimes used when selling a struggling company whose net worth may be negative. If some party agrees to take it over and assume its liabilities as well as its assets, the seller may actually agree to make a large payment to the buyer. But the buyer must still make some payment, however small, for the company in order to establish that both sides have given consideration.

=== Concealing the value of consideration ===
A peppercorn is also used in more balanced contracts, where one side wishes to conceal the nature of their payment. For example, since real estate contracts are generally matters of public record, the purchaser of a house may not wish to list the exact amount of the payment on the contract. But there must be some specific payment listed in the contract, or the contract will be considered void for lack of consideration. So the contract may be written to reflect that the house is being sold in return for "ten dollars and other good and valuable consideration". The ten dollars is the "peppercorn" that provides concrete consideration and ensures that the contract is valid, while the actual amount paid for the house is hidden and referred to only as the "other good and valuable consideration".

=== In leases for real property ===
Another common example is the English practice of "peppercorn rent", the nominal rental sum for property, land or buildings. Where a rental contract is put in place and the owner of the property wishes it to be rent-free, it is normal to charge a small sum as "peppercorn rent", because if the owner wants to lease the property, he must charge some rent so that consideration exists for both parties. Furthermore, a peppercorn rent is often used as a form of nominal ground rent where a (potentially substantial) premium has also been paid on commencement of a long lease of, say, 99 or 125 years (a "virtual freehold"). The notional collection of the annual peppercorn rent helps to maintain a formal landlord–tenant relationship between the two parties, precluding the risk of a claim for adverse possession from the tenant arising, were no consideration to be paid for an extended period. An example is that of Andrew Mountbatten-Windsor (formerly Prince Andrew, Duke of York) and Prince Edward, Duke of Edinburgh, who were required to pay a nominal peppercorn rent for the Royal Lodge and Bagshot Park, respectively (if demanded). The former embassy of the United States in London was leased from the Duke of Westminster, being the only embassy that the United States did not own outright, for a peppercorn rent.

A peppercorn rent is sometimes denominated in whimsical physical goods rather than currency. For example, many of the buildings in London's Covent Garden are leased at a rent of "one red apple and a posy of flowers", the National Coastwatch station at St Albans Head occupies buildings owned by the Encombe Estate in exchange for "one crab per annum if demanded" while the Isles of Scilly Wildlife Trust leases untenanted land on the Isles of Scilly from the Duchy of Cornwall for one daffodil per year.

In response to the ground rent scandal of the 2010s, the Leasehold Reform (Ground Rent) Act 2022 defines a peppercorn rent for the first time in English law as an annual rent of one actual peppercorn and limits ground rent on most new residential long leases to that amount. Besides there being no obligation for a landlord to actually levy the rent, the law also bans landlords from charging any administrative fee for collecting a peppercorn rent.

== Transactions and traditions involving peppercorns ==
The Masonic Lodge of St. George's, Bermuda, rents the Old State House as its lodge for the annual sum of a single peppercorn, presented to the Governor of Bermuda on a velvet cushion atop a silver platter, in an annual ceremony performed since 1816 on or about 23 April.

The Sevenoaks Vine Cricket Club in Sevenoaks, England, rents the Vine Cricket Ground from Sevenoaks Town Council at a yearly rent of one peppercorn. It is many years since the club paid only one peppercorn for the rent of the pavilion. The council, in return, gives a new cricket ball to Baron Sackville every year if requested.

The University of Bath's main campus is on a 999-year lease from the then Bath City Council. Each year a peppercorn is presented by the Treasurer of the University to the Chairman of the Bath and North East Somerset Council as rent (but also to further the relationships between "town and gown").

The Australian National University Law Students' Society (ANU LSS) has a magazine called Peppercorn Magazine, which was founded in 1969. In August 2023, the ANU LSS launched the 'Peppercorn Pedestal', featuring a dried black peppercorn on a small velvet pillow in celebration of the various student traditions involving peppercorns at the ANU College of Law.

== See also ==
- One-dollar salary
