= Stamford Bridge (stadium) =

Association football stadium in Fulham, London, England

Coordinates: 51°28′54″N 0°11′28″W

- "The Bridge"

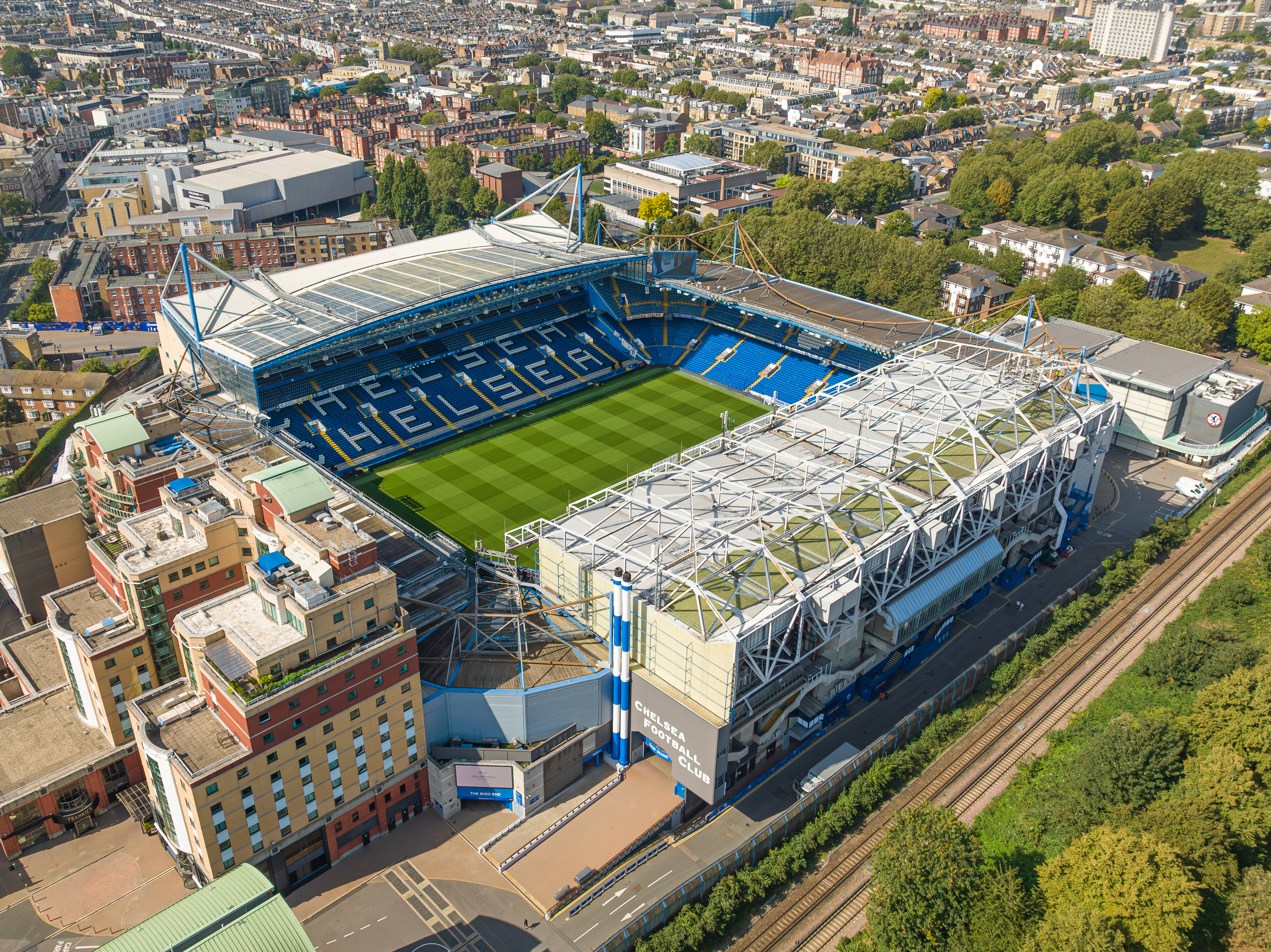
- Aerial view of the stadium in 2023
- Interactive map of Stamford Bridge
- Full name: Stamford Bridge
- Address: Fulham Road
- Location: Fulham; London, England; SW6 1HS
- Owner: Chelsea Pitch Owners
- Operator: Chelsea
- Capacity: 40,044
- Executive suites: 51
- Surface: GrassMaster by Tarkett Sports
- Record attendance: 82,905 (Chelsea–Arsenal, 12 October 1935)
- Field size: 112.64 by 73.82 yards (103.0 m × 67.5 m)
- Public transit: Fulham Broadway

Construction
- Built: 1877
- Opened: 28 April 1877
- Renovated: 1904–1905, 1998
- Architect: Archibald Leitch (1887)

Tenants
- London Athletic Club (1877–1904); Chelsea (1905–present); Chelsea Women (2016–present); Shakhtar Donetsk (European competitions) (2026–present)

Stamford Bridge (/ˈstæmfərd/) is a football stadium in Fulham, in the Borough of Hammersmith and Fulham, in West London. It is the home of Premier League club Chelsea. With a capacity of 40,044, it is the twelfth-largest football stadium in England.

Opened in 1877, the stadium was used by London Athletic Club until 1905, when new owner Gus Mears founded Chelsea Football Club to occupy the ground; Chelsea have played their home games there ever since. It has undergone major changes over the years, most recently in the 1990s when it was renovated into a modern, all-seater stadium.

Stamford Bridge has hosted Charity Shield games. It has also hosted numerous other sports, such as cricket, rugby union, rugby league, speedway, greyhound racing, baseball and American football. The stadium's highest official attendance is 82,905, for a league match between Chelsea and Arsenal on 12 October 1935.

== History ==
=== Early history ===
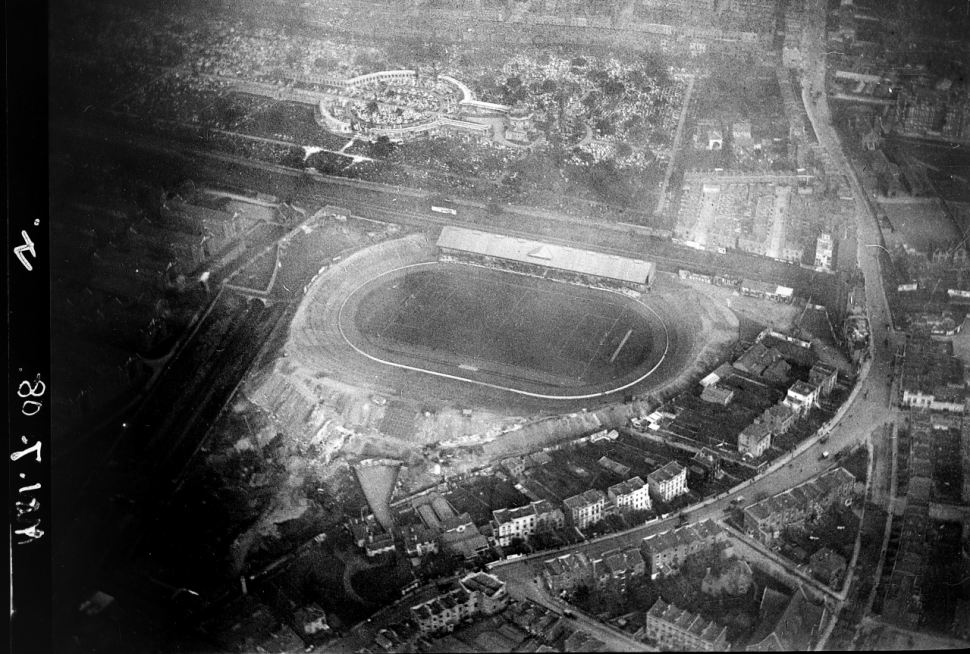
Aerial view of Chelsea's Stamford Bridge stadium in 1909

"Stamford Bridge" is considered to be a derivative of "Samfordesbrigge" meaning "the bridge at the sandy ford". Eighteenth century maps show a "Stanford Creek" running along the route of what is now a railway line at the back of the East Stand as a tributary of the Thames. The upper reaches of this tributary have been known as Billingswell Ditch, Pools Creek and Counters Creek. In medieval times the creek was known as Billingwell Dyche, derived from "Billing's spring or stream". It formed the boundary between the parishes of Kensington and Fulham. By the 18th century, the creek had become known as Counter's Creek, which is the name it has retained since.

The stream had two local bridges: Stamford Bridge on the Fulham Road (also recorded as Little Chelsea Bridge) and Stanbridge on the King's Road, now known as Stanley Bridge. The existing Stamford Bridge was built of brick in 1860–1862 and since been partly reconstructed.

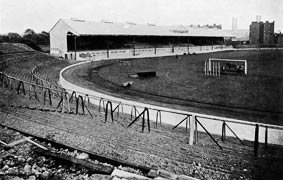
The brand New Stamford Bridge stadium in August 1905.

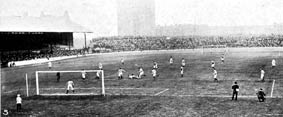
Chelsea beat West Brom at Stamford Bridge in September 1905.

Stamford Bridge opened in 1877 as a home for the London Athletic Club and was used almost exclusively for that purpose until 1904, when the lease was acquired by brothers Gus and Joseph Mears, who wanted to stage high-profile professional football matches there. However, previous to this, in 1898, Stamford Bridge played host to the World Championship of shinty between Beauly Shinty Club and London Camanachd. Stamford Bridge was built near the Lillie Bridge Grounds, an older sports ground which had hosted the 1873 FA Cup Final and the first ever amateur boxing matches (among other things). It was initially offered to Fulham Football Club, but they turned it down for financial reasons. After considering the sale of the land to the Great Western Railway Company, the Mears decided to found their own football club, Chelsea, to occupy the ground as a rival to Fulham. Noted football ground architect Archibald Leitch, who had also designed Ibrox, Celtic Park, Craven Cottage and Hampden Park, was hired to construct the stadium. In its early days, Stamford Bridge stadium was served by a small railway station, Chelsea and Fulham railway station, which was later closed after World War II bombing.

Stamford Bridge was initially planned to have a capacity of around 100,000 and was the second largest ground in England after Crystal Palace. It was used as the FA Cup final venue. As originally constructed, Stamford Bridge was an athletics track and the pitch was initially located in the middle of the running track. This meant that spectators were separated from the field of play on all sides by the width of running track and, on the north and south sides, the separation was particularly large because the long sides of the running track considerably exceeded the length of the football pitch. The stadium had a single stand for 5,000 spectators on the east side. Designed by Archibald Leitch, it was an exact replica of the Stevenage Road Stand he had previously built at the re-developed Craven Cottage (and the main reason why Fulham had chosen not to move into the new ground). The other sides were all open in a vast bowl and thousands of tons of material excavated from the building of the Piccadilly line provided high terracing for standing spectators exposed to the elements on the west side.

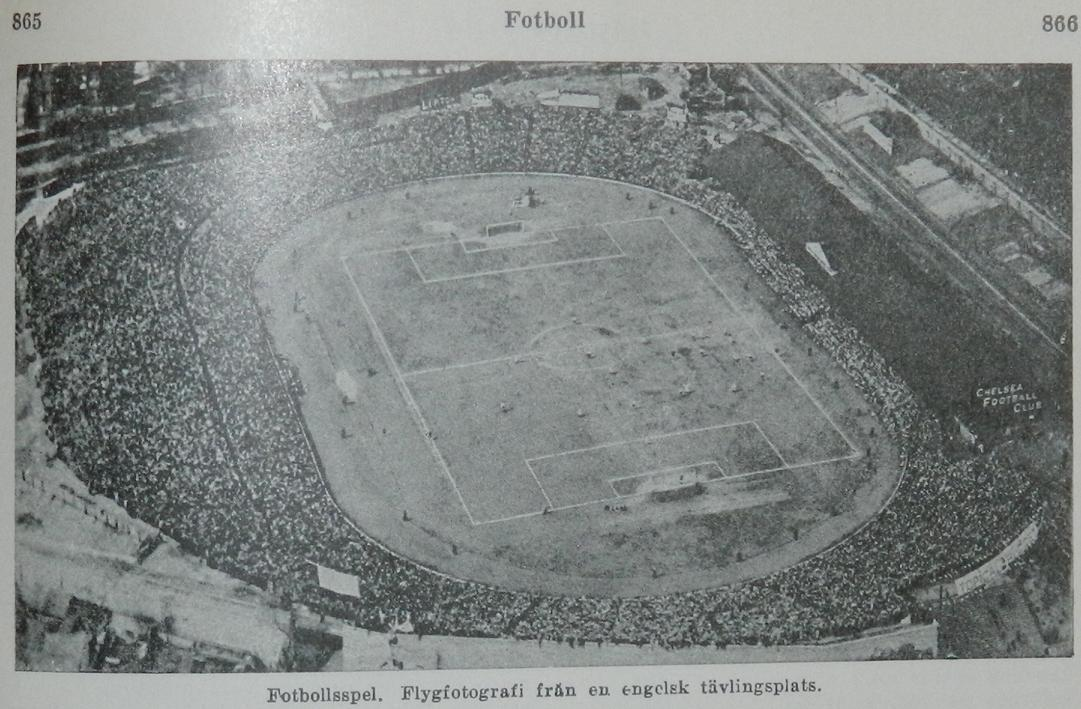
A jam packed Stamford Bridge in the early 1930s.

In 1945, Stamford Bridge staged one of the most notable matches in its history. Soviet side FC Dynamo Moscow were invited to tour the United Kingdom at the end of the Second World War and Chelsea were the first side they faced. An estimated crowd of over 100,000 crammed into Stamford Bridge to watch a 3–3 draw, with many spectators on the dog track and on top of the stands.

=== Crisis ===
In the early 1970s the club's owners initiated a project to renovate Stamford Bridge. However, the cost of building the East Stand escalated out of control after shortages of materials and a builders' strike and the remainder of the ground remained untouched. The new East Stand was finished, but most of the (unusable) running tracks remained, and the new stand was also displaced by approximately 20 metres, compared to the pitch. The idea was to move the entire stadium towards the north. But due to the financial situation in the mid-1970s the other stands were not rebuilt for another two decades. In the meantime, Chelsea struggled in the league, and attendances fell and debts increased. The club was relegated to the Second Division in 1975 and again in 1979, narrowly avoiding the drop into the Third Division in 1983 before finally returning to the First Division a year later.

The increase in the costs, combined with other factors, sent the club into decline. As a part of financial restructuring in the late 1970s, the freehold was separated from the club and when new Chelsea chairman Ken Bates bought the club for £1 in 1982, he did not buy the ground. A large chunk of the Stamford Bridge freehold was subsequently sold to property developers Marler Estates. The sale resulted in a long and acrimonious legal fight between Bates and Marler Estates. Marler Estates was ultimately forced into bankruptcy after a market crash in the early 1990s, allowing Bates to do a deal with its banks and re-unite the freehold with the club.

During the 1984–85 season, following a series of pitch invasions and fights by football hooligans during matches at the stadium, chairman Ken Bates erected an electric perimeter fence between the stands and the pitch – identical to the one which effectively controlled cattle on his dairy farm. However, the electric fence was never turned on and before long it was dismantled, due to the GLC blocking it from being switched on for health and safety reasons.

=== Modernisation and redevelopment ===
With the Taylor Report arising from the Hillsborough disaster being published in January 1990 and ordering all top division clubs to have all-seater stadiums in time for the 1994–95 season, Chelsea's plan for a 34,000-seat stadium at Stamford Bridge was given approval by Hammersmith and Fulham council on 19 July 1990.

The re-building of the stadium commenced and successive building phases during the 1990s eliminated the original running track. The construction of the East Stand some 20 years earlier had begun the process of eliminating the track. All stands, now roofed and all-seater, are immediately adjacent to the pitch. This structure captures and concentrates the noise of supporters. The pitch, the turnstiles, and the naming rights of the club are now owned by Chelsea Pitch Owners, an organisation set up to prevent the stadium from being purchased by property developers.

KSS Design Group (architects) designed the complete redevelopment of Stamford Bridge Stadium and its hotels, megastore, offices and residential buildings.

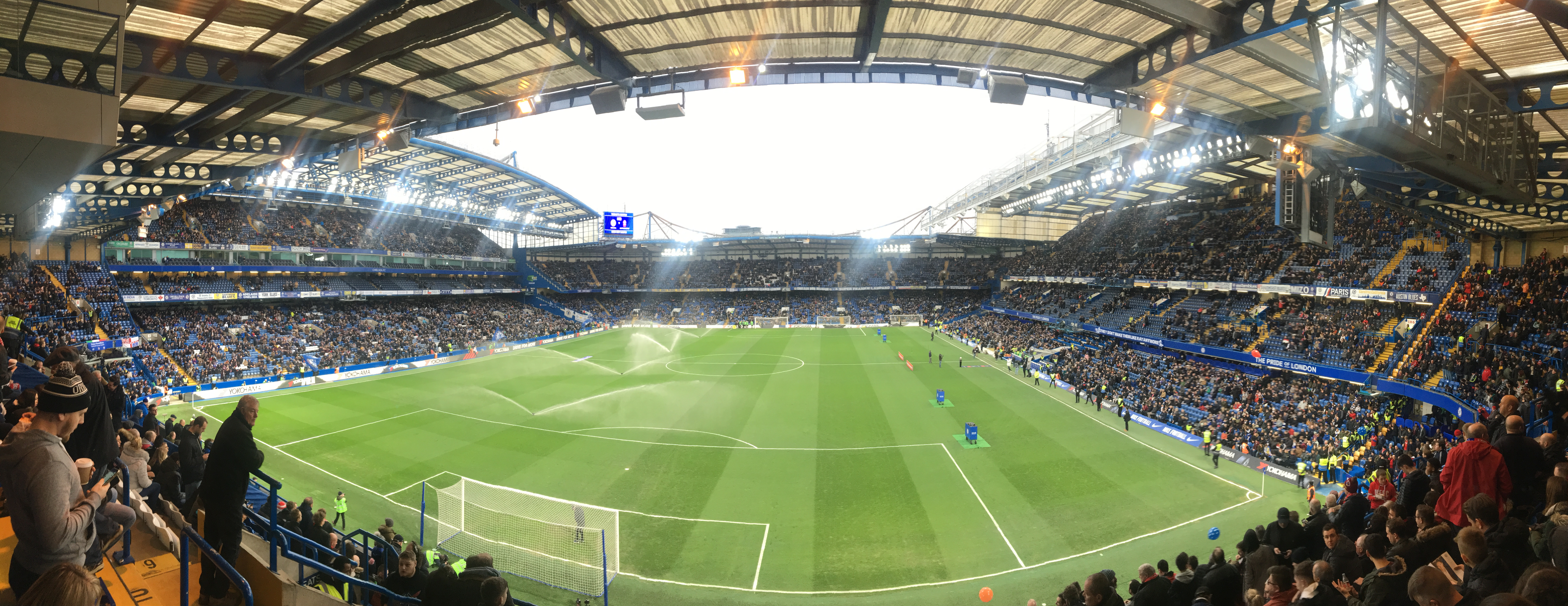
Stamford Bridge before a game against Nottingham Forest in 2020

== Other uses ==
=== Chelsea Women ===
Since the 2010s, Chelsea F.C. Women, the club's women's affiliate, has played selected games at Stamford Bridge, including league games against domestic rivals as well as all UEFA Women's Champions League games.

In April 2026, after nine years of playing at Kingsmeadow, Chelsea Women announced that for the 2026–27 Women's Super League season and onwards they would be moving to play all of their home matches at Stamford Bridge.

=== Other football events ===
Stamford Bridge was the venue of the FA Cup Final from 1920 to 1922, before being replaced by Wembley Stadium in 1923. It has staged ten FA Cup semi-finals, ten Charity Shield matches, and three England matches, the last in 1932. It was one of the home venues for the representative London XI team that played in the original Inter-Cities Fairs Cup. The team played the home leg of the two-legged final at Stamford Bridge, drawing 2–2 with FC Barcelona; they lost the away leg 6–0, however.

On 23 May 2013, the stadium hosted the final of the 2012–13 UEFA Women's Champions League.

On 5 August 2023, Stamford Bridge hosted charity match Game4Ukraine to raise money for the United24 initiative, a fundraiser to help in Ukraine's rebuilding of facilities and infrastructure that suffered damage from the Russian invasion of Ukraine as well as the ongoing Russo-Ukrainian War.

In 2019 and 2024, Stamford Bridge has also been used as the venue for Soccer Aid, an annual charity match initially organised by singer Robbie Williams and actor Jonathan Wilkes.

In the 2026–27 season, Chelsea failed to qualify for European competition. They instead agreed to host Shakhtar Donetsk's Champions League league phase home matches, as the latter were required to play at neutral venues due to the Russian invasion of Ukraine.

Results of FA Cup Finals at Stamford Bridge

Year	Attendance	Winner		Runner-up
1920	50,018	Aston Villa	1–0	Huddersfield Town
1921	72,805	Tottenham Hotspur	1–0	Wolverhampton Wanderers
1922	53,000	Huddersfield Town	1–0	Preston North End

==== International matches ====
- 11 December 1909: England Amateurs 9–1 Netherlands
- 5 April 1913: England 1–0 Scotland
- 20 November 1929: England 6–0 Wales
- 7 December 1932: England 4–3 Austria
- 11 May 1946: England 4–1 Switzerland (Victory International)
- 25 March 2013: Brazil 1–1 Russia

=== Other sports ===
Stamford Bridge has also hosted a variety of other sporting events since Chelsea have occupied the ground. In October 1905 it hosted a rugby union match between the All Blacks and Middlesex, and in 1908, Stamford Bridge was the venue for a Rugby League international between Great Britain and the touring New Zealand All Golds, who won 18–6. Two New Zealanders George Smith and William "Massa" Johnston played and scored in both these games. Two further Rugby League games were held in 1952, British Empire XIII v New Zealand, and 1983, Fulham v Cardiff. In 1914 Stamford Bridge hosted a baseball match between the touring New York Giants and the Chicago White Sox. In 1924 the stadium hosted the 1924 Women's Olympiad, the first international event for women in track and field in the UK. A speedway team operated from the stadium from 1929 until 1932, winning the Southern League in their opening season. Initially open meetings were held there in 1928. A nineteen-year-old junior rider, Charlie Biddle, was killed in a racing accident. In 1931, black cinders were laid onto the circuit suitable for use by speedway and athletics. A midget car meeting reportedly attracted a crowd of 50,000 people in 1948.

The ground was used in 1980 for the first major day-night floodlit cricket match between Essex and West Indies (although organised by Surrey) which was a commercial success; the following year it hosted the final of the inaugural Lambert & Butler county cricket competition. It, however, failed and the experiment of playing cricket on football grounds was ended. Stamford Bridge briefly hosted American football – despite not being long enough for a regulation-size gridiron field – when the London Monarchs were based there in 1997.

=== Greyhound racing ===
The Greyhound Racing Association (GRA) brought greyhound racing to Stamford Bridge on 31 July 1933 and this forced the London Athletic Club to leave the venue. Totalisator turnover in 1946 was nearly £6 million (£5,749,592); to put this in perspective to football, the British transfer record at the same time in 1946 was £14,500.

On 1 August 1968 the GRA closed Stamford Bridge to greyhound racing quoting the fact that Stamford Bridge had to race on the same days as White City. An attempt by Chelsea to bring back greyhound racing to Stamford Bridge in 1976, to alleviate debts, failed when the GRA refused them permission to do so.

== Structure and facilities ==
The Bridge pitch is surrounded on each side by four covered all-seater stands, officially known as the Matthew Harding Stand (North), East stand, The Shed End (South) and West Stand. Each stand has at least two tiers and was constructed for entirely different reasons as part of separate expansion plans.

=== Matthew Harding Stand ===
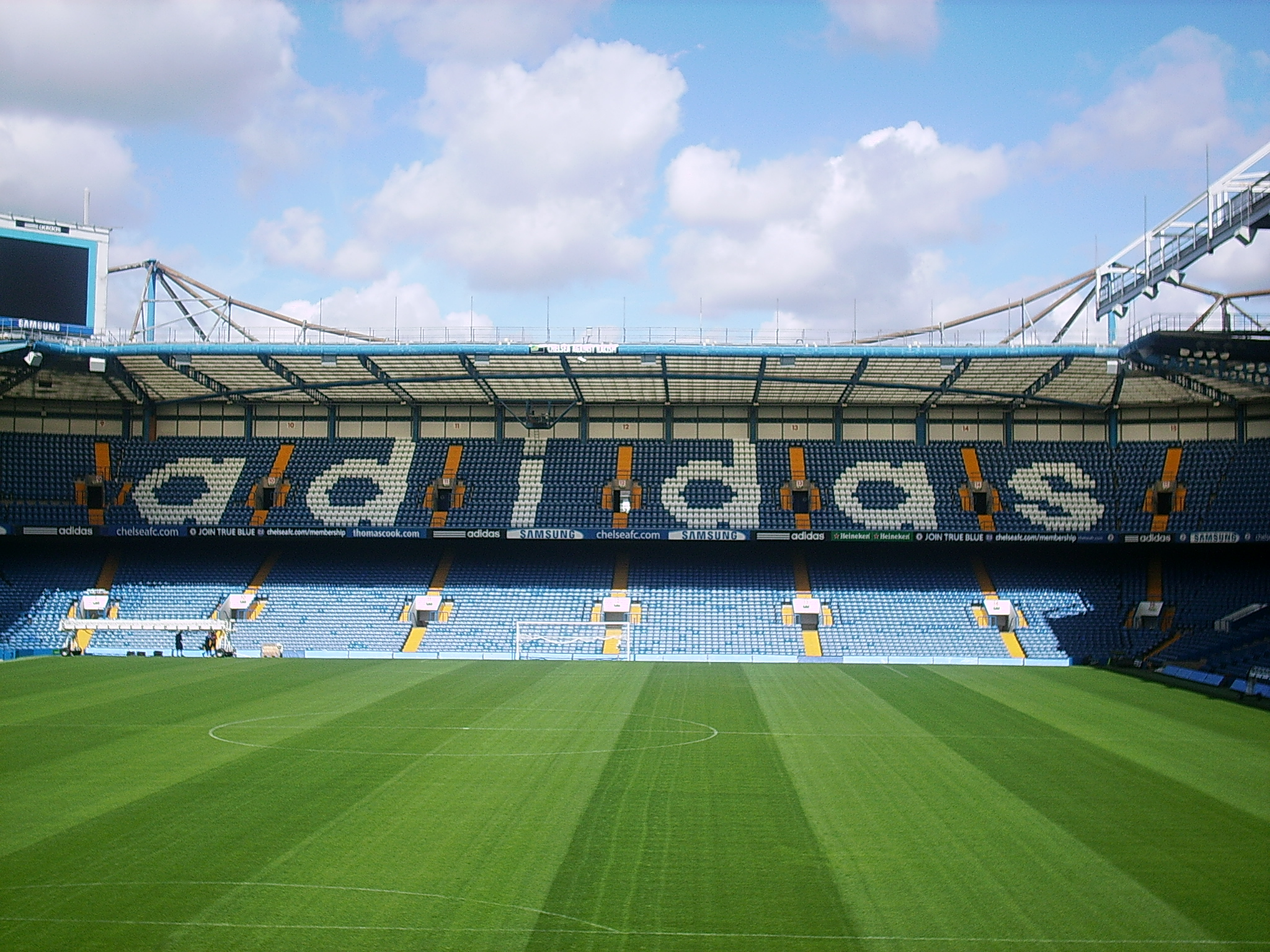
The Matthew Harding Stand

The Matthew Harding Stand, previously known as the North Stand, is along the north edge of the pitch. In 1939, a small two storied North Stand including seating was erected. It was originally intended to span the entire northern end, but the outbreak of World War II and its aftermath compelled the club to keep the stand small. It was demolished and replaced by open terracing for standing supporters in 1976. The North Terrace was closed in 1993 and the present North Stand of two tiers (the Matthew Harding Stand) was then constructed at that end.

It is named after former Chelsea director Matthew Harding, whose investment helped transform the club in the early 1990s before his death in a helicopter accident on 22 October 1996. His investment in the club enabled construction of the stand which was completed in time for the 1996–97 season. It has two tiers and accommodates most season-ticket holders, giving it an excellent atmosphere, especially in the lower tier. Any proposal to enlarge the facility would necessitate demolition of the adjacent Chelsea F.C. Museum and Chelsea Health Club and Spa.

For some Champions League matches, this stand operates at reduced capacity, some entrances being obstructed by the presence of TV outside-broadcast vehicles.

=== East Stand ===
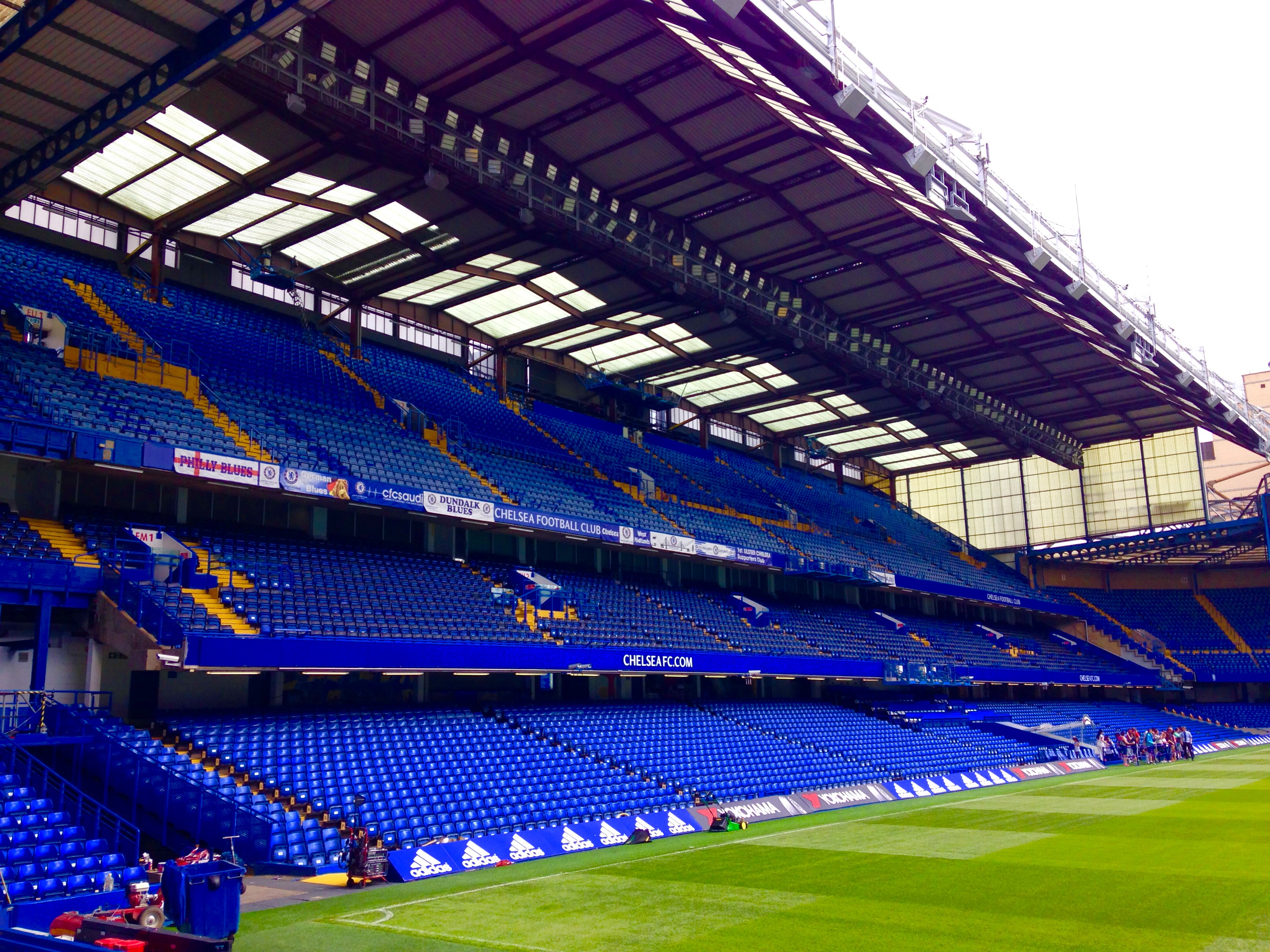
The East Stand

The only covered stand when Stamford Bridge was renovated into a football ground in 1905, the East Stand had a gabled corrugated iron roof, with around 6,000 seats and a terraced enclosure. The stand remained until 1972, when it was demolished in what was meant to be the opening phase of a comprehensive redevelopment of the stadium. The new stand was opened at the start of the 1974–75 season, but due to the ensuing financial difficulties at the club, it was the only part of the development to be completed.

The East Stand essentially survives in its 1973 three-tiered cantilevered form, although it has been much refurbished and modernised since. It is the heart of the stadium, housing the tunnel, dugout, dressing rooms, conference room, press centre, Audio-Visual and commentary box. The middle tier is occupied by facilities, clubs, and executive suites. The upper tier provides spectators with one of the best views of the pitch and it is the only section to have survived the extensive redevelopment of the 90s. Previously, it was the home to away supporters on the bottom tier. However, at the start of the 2005–06 season, then-manager José Mourinho requested that the family section move to this part of the stand, to boost team morale. Away fans were moved to the Shed End.

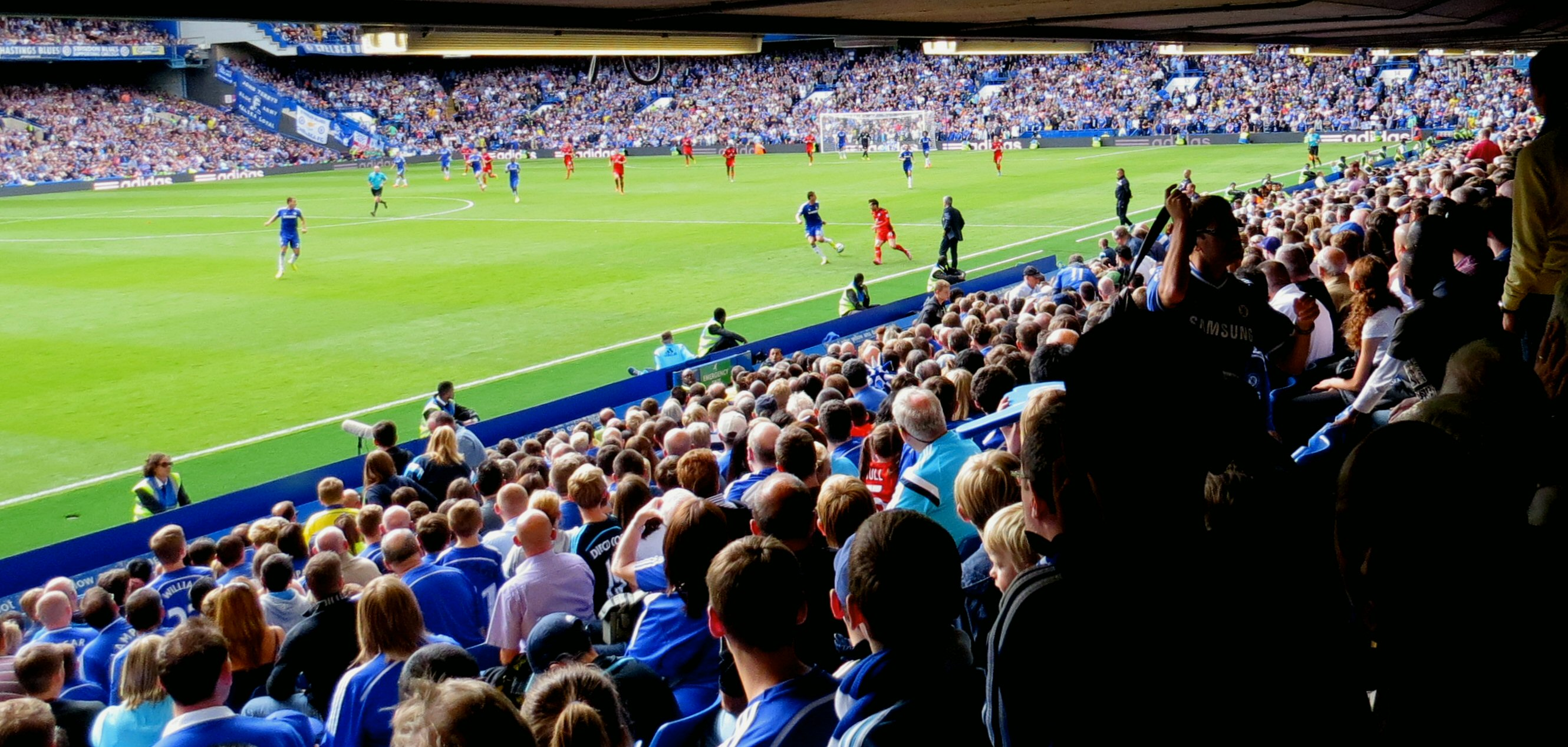
View from the Lower East Stand, August 2014

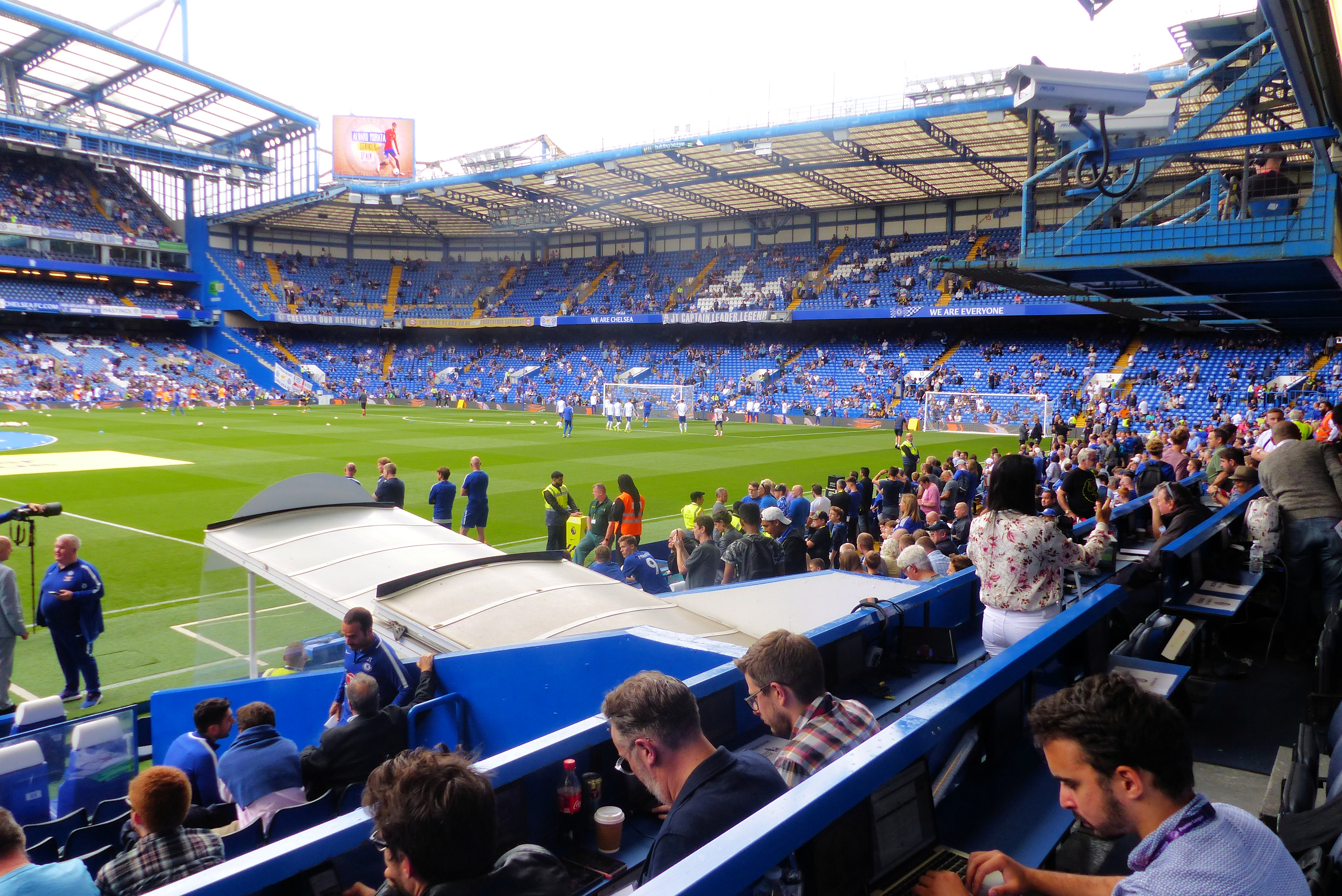
A view from the press box at Stamford Bridge

=== Shed End ===
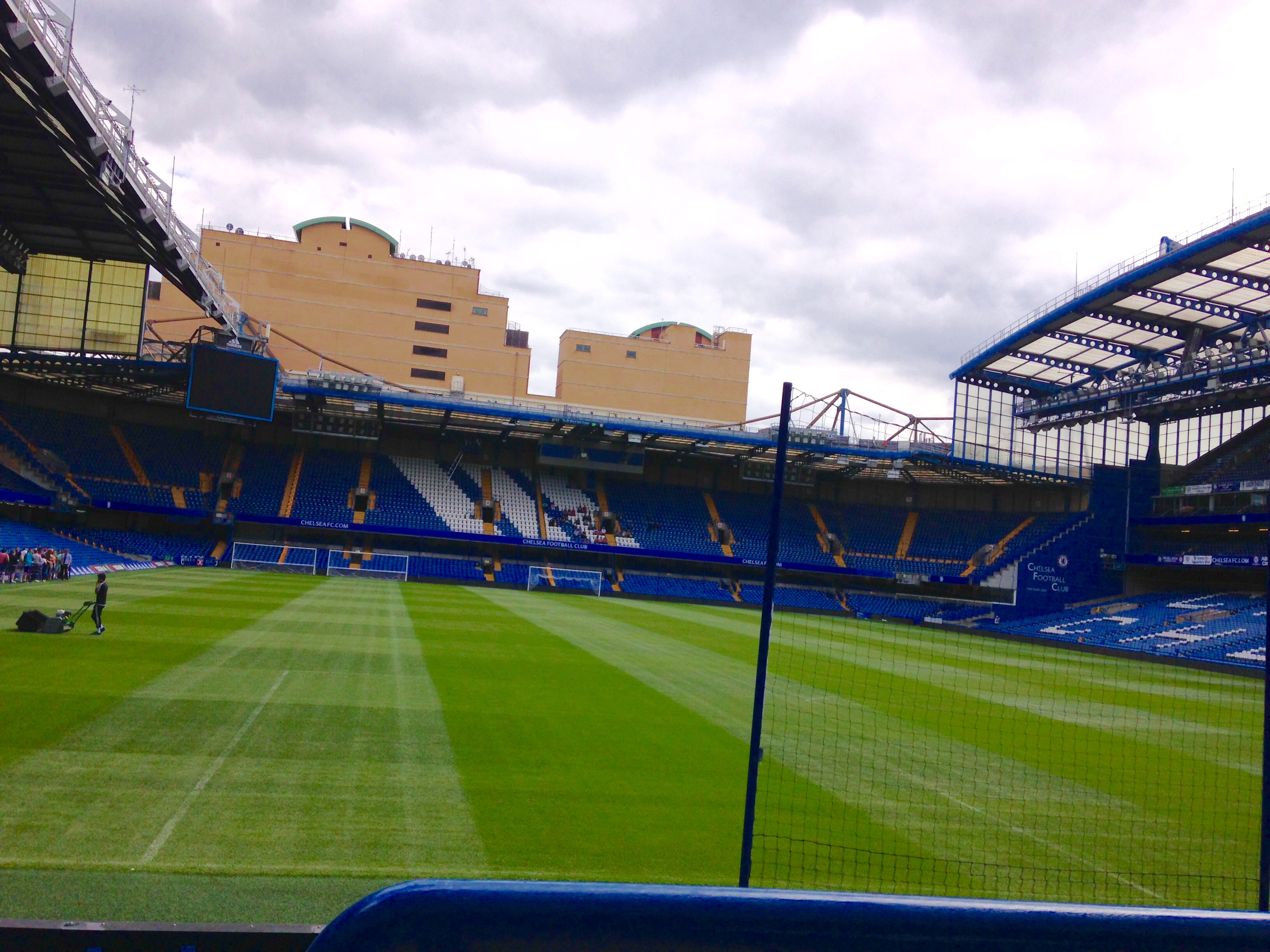
The Shed End, the smallest stand at Stamford Bridge with around 6,000 seats

The Shed End is along the south side of the pitch. In 1930, a new terrace was built on the south side, for more standing spectators. It was originally known as the Fulham Road End, but supporters nicknamed it 'The Shed' and this led the club to officially change its name. It became the most favoured spot for the loudest and most die-hard support, until the terrace was demolished in 1994, when all-seater stadia became compulsory by law as a safety measure in light of the Taylor Report following the Hillsborough disaster. The seated stand which replaced it is still known as the Shed End (see below).

The new stand opened in time for the 1997/98 season. Along with the Matthew Harding Stand, it is an area of the ground where many vocal fans congregate. The view from the upper tier is widely regarded as one of the best in the stadium. The Shed also contains the centenary museum and a memorial wall, where families of deceased fans are able to leave a permanent memorial of their loved ones, indicating their eternal support. A large chunk of the original wall from the back of the Shed End terrace still stands and runs along the south side of the stadium. It has recently been decorated with lights and large images of Chelsea legends. Since 2005, it has been where away supporters are housed; they are allocated 3,000 tickets towards the east side, roughly half of the capacity of the stand. At domestic cup matches, away fans take the entire stand.

Peter Osgood's ashes were laid to rest under the Shed End penalty spot in 2006.

=== West Stand ===
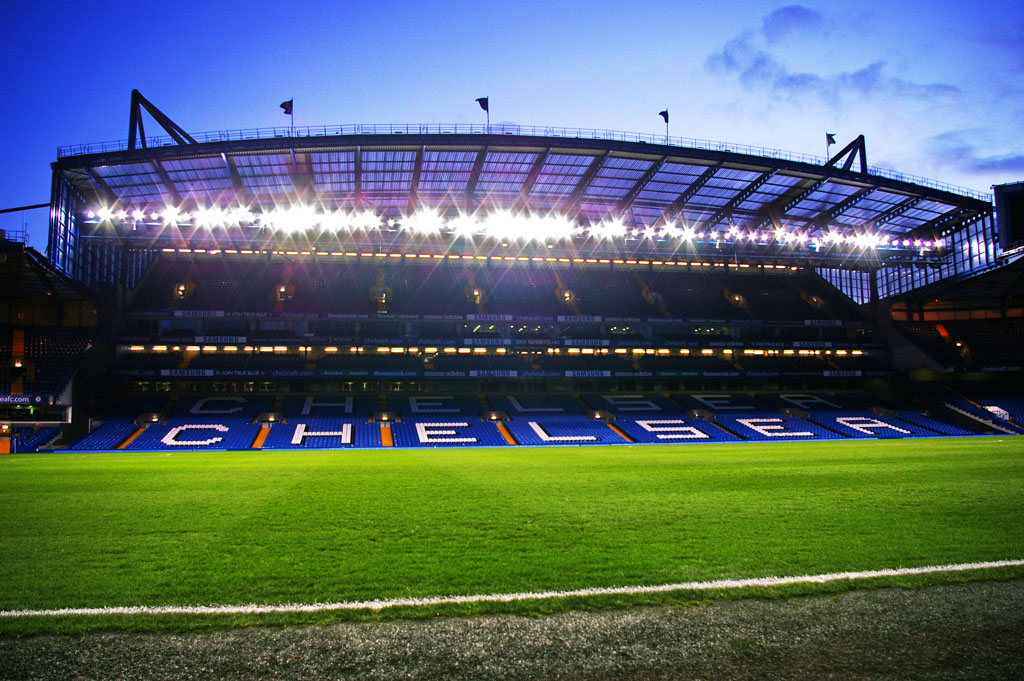
The West Stand is currently the largest stand at Stamford Bridge with 13,500 seats

In 1964–65, a seated West Stand was built to replace the existing terracing on the west side. Most of the West Stand consisted of rising ranks of wooden tip up seats on iron frames, but seating at the very front was on concrete forms known as "the Benches". The old West Stand was demolished in 1997 and replaced by the current West Stand. It has three tiers, in addition to a row of executive boxes that stretches the length of the stand.

The lower tier was built on schedule and opened in 1998. However, difficulties with planning permission meant that the stand was not fully completed until 2001. Construction of the stand almost caused another financial crisis, which would have seen the club fall into administration, but for the personal intervention of Roman Abramovich. In borrowing £70m from Eurobonds to finance the project, Ken Bates put Chelsea into a highly perilous financial position, primarily because of the repayment terms he had agreed to.

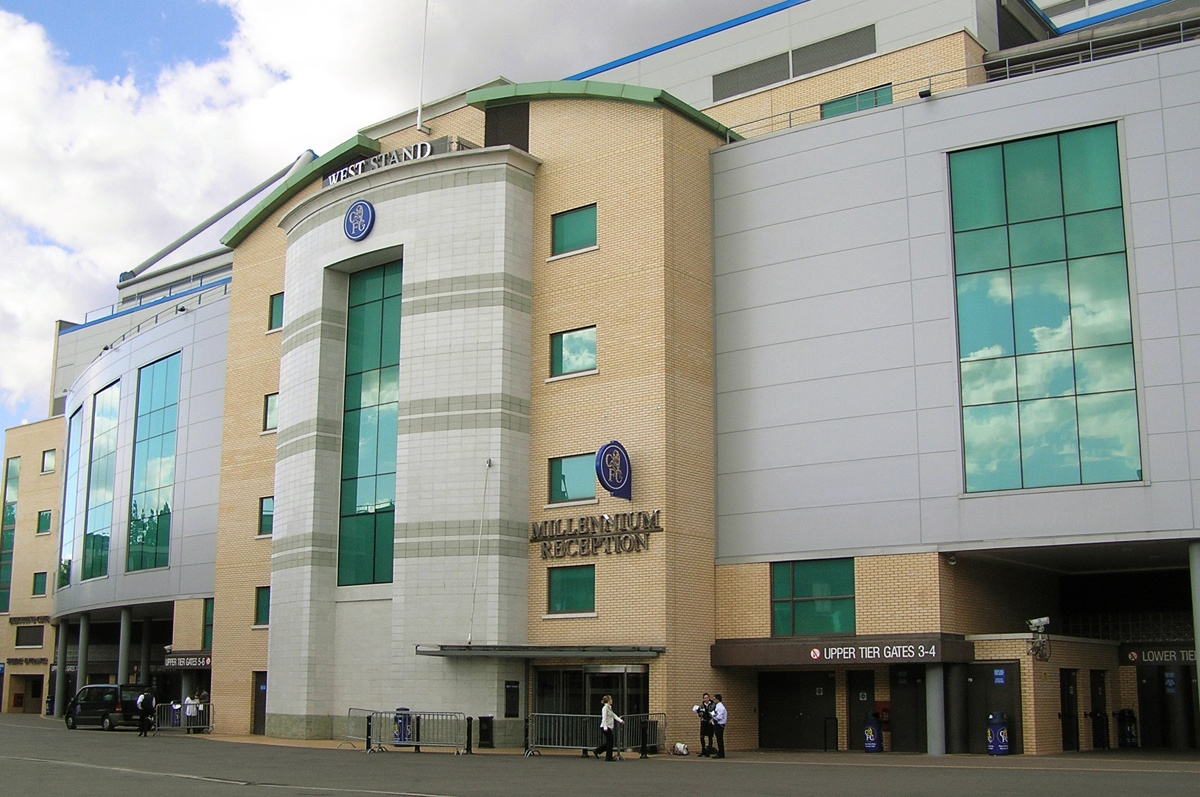
The Stamford Bridge West Stand exterior (2006).

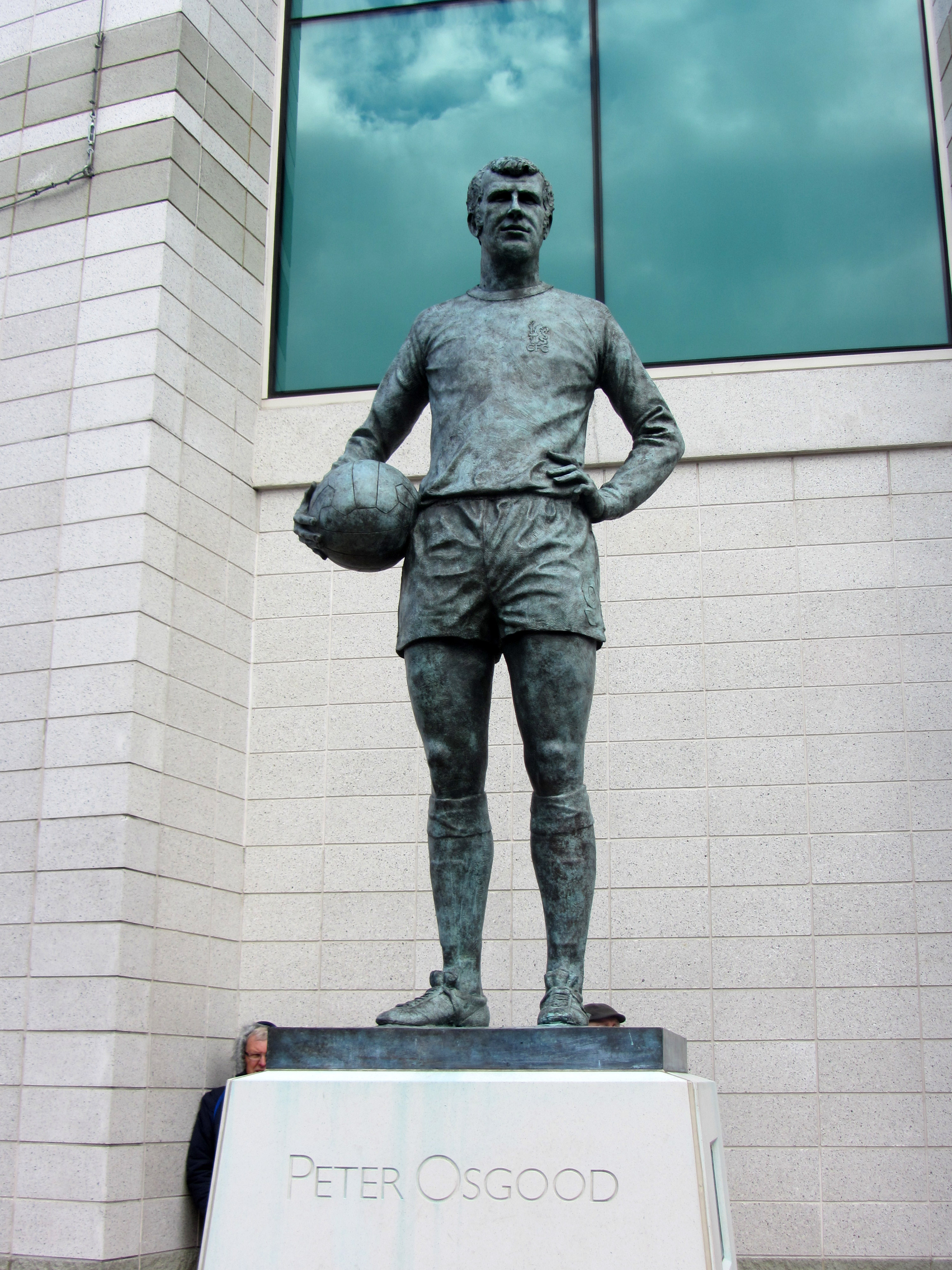
- Statue of Peter Osgood outside Stamford Bridge, by Philip Jackson.
- A plaque on the side, written by official club historian Rick Glanvill, reads:
- • Stamford bridge has many heroes but only one king •
- • Graceful technician • Nerveless striker •
- • Icon of the swinging sixties •
- • Adored by fans • Scorer of immortal cup final goals •
- • A big man for a golden age •

Now complete, the stand is the primary external 'face' of the stadium, being the first thing fans see when entering the main gate on Fulham Road. The Main Entrance is flanked by hospitality entrances, formerly named after former Chelsea players Nigel Spackman and David Speedie. Signage at those entrances with those players' names was removed in 2020, to be replaced by directional signage, meaning those entrances are no longer named after any player. The stand also features the largest concourse area in the stadium, it is also known as the 'Great Hall' and is used for many functions at Stamford Bridge, including the Chelsea Player of the Year ceremony.

The aforementioned executive boxes, also known as the Millennium Suites, are the home of the majority of matchday hospitality guests. Each box is also named after a former Chelsea player (names in brackets):

- Tambling Suite (Bobby Tambling)
- Clarke Suite (Steve Clarke)
- Harris Suite (Ron Harris)
- 'Drakes' (Ted Drake)
- Bonetti (Peter Bonetti)
- Hollins (John Hollins)

In October 2010, a nine-foot statue of popular 1960s Chelsea forward Peter Osgood, created by Philip Jackson, was unveiled by Peter's widow, Lynn. It is positioned in a recess of the West Stand near the Millennium Reception.

In January 2020, Chelsea FC unveiled a large mural by Solomon Souza on an outside wall of the West Stand of the stadium. The mural is part of Chelsea's 'Say No to Antisemitism' campaign funded by club owner Roman Abramovich. Included on the mural are depictions of footballers Julius Hirsch and Árpád Weisz, who were killed at Auschwitz concentration camp, and Ron Jones, a British prisoner of war known as the 'Goalkeeper of Auschwitz'.

=== Pitch ===
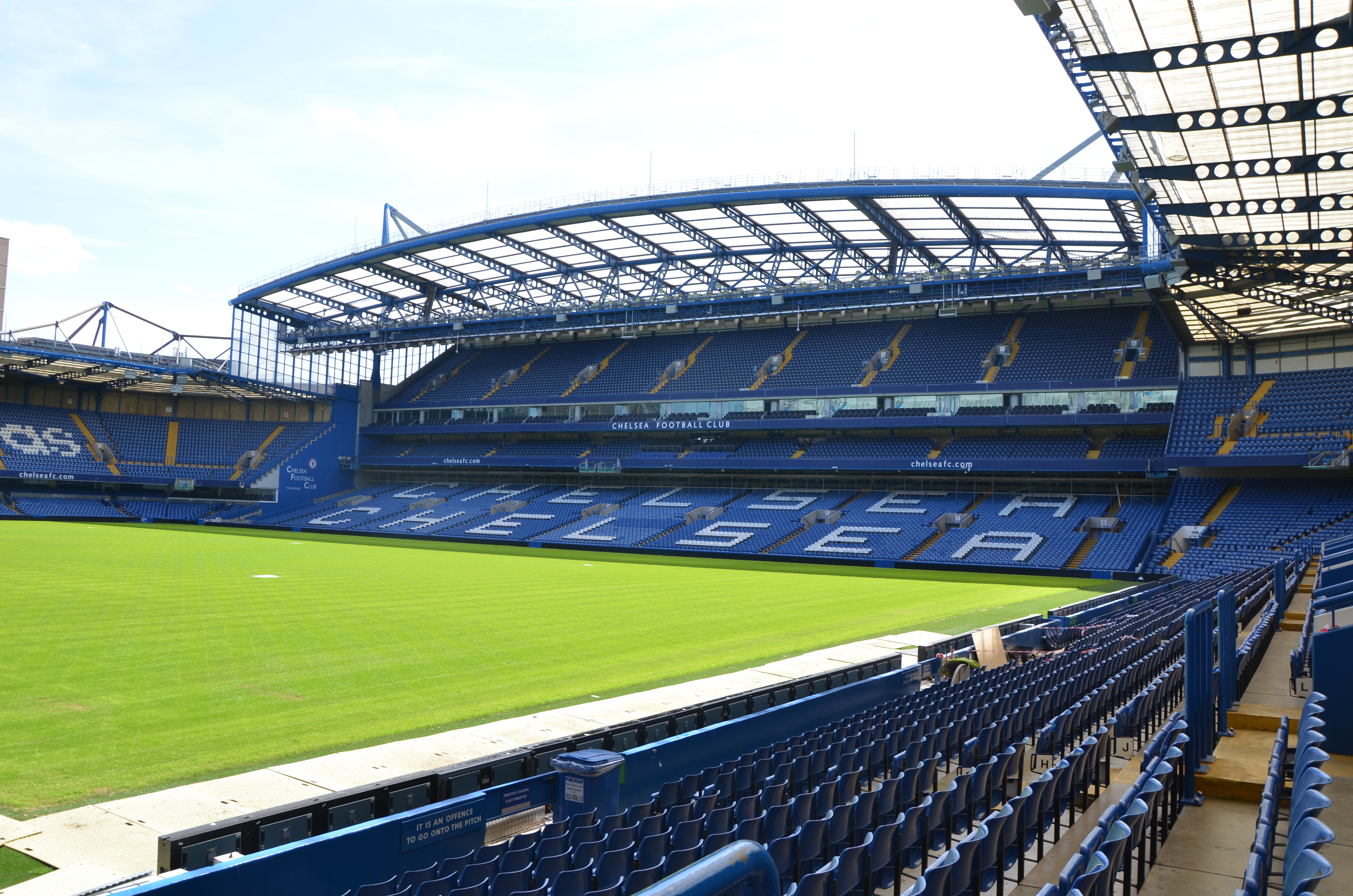
The Matthew Harding End, West Stand, and Shed End (2013)

The Bridge opened in 1877 as a home for the London Athletic Club and was used almost exclusively for that purpose until 1904. Subsequently, with the opening of the football club, the need for a playing surface resulted in the construction of the pitch. In June 2015 significant upgrades were made to the undersoil-heating, drainage, and irrigation systems. Along with the installation a new hybrid grass pitch, this brought the pitch up to modern standards. The current pitch at the ground measures approximately 103 metres (112.9 yd) long by 68 metres (74.03 yd) wide, with a couple metres of run-off space on all sides. The south stand has by far the most run-off space being unto 3.5 metres deep.

== Chelsea Village and surroundings ==
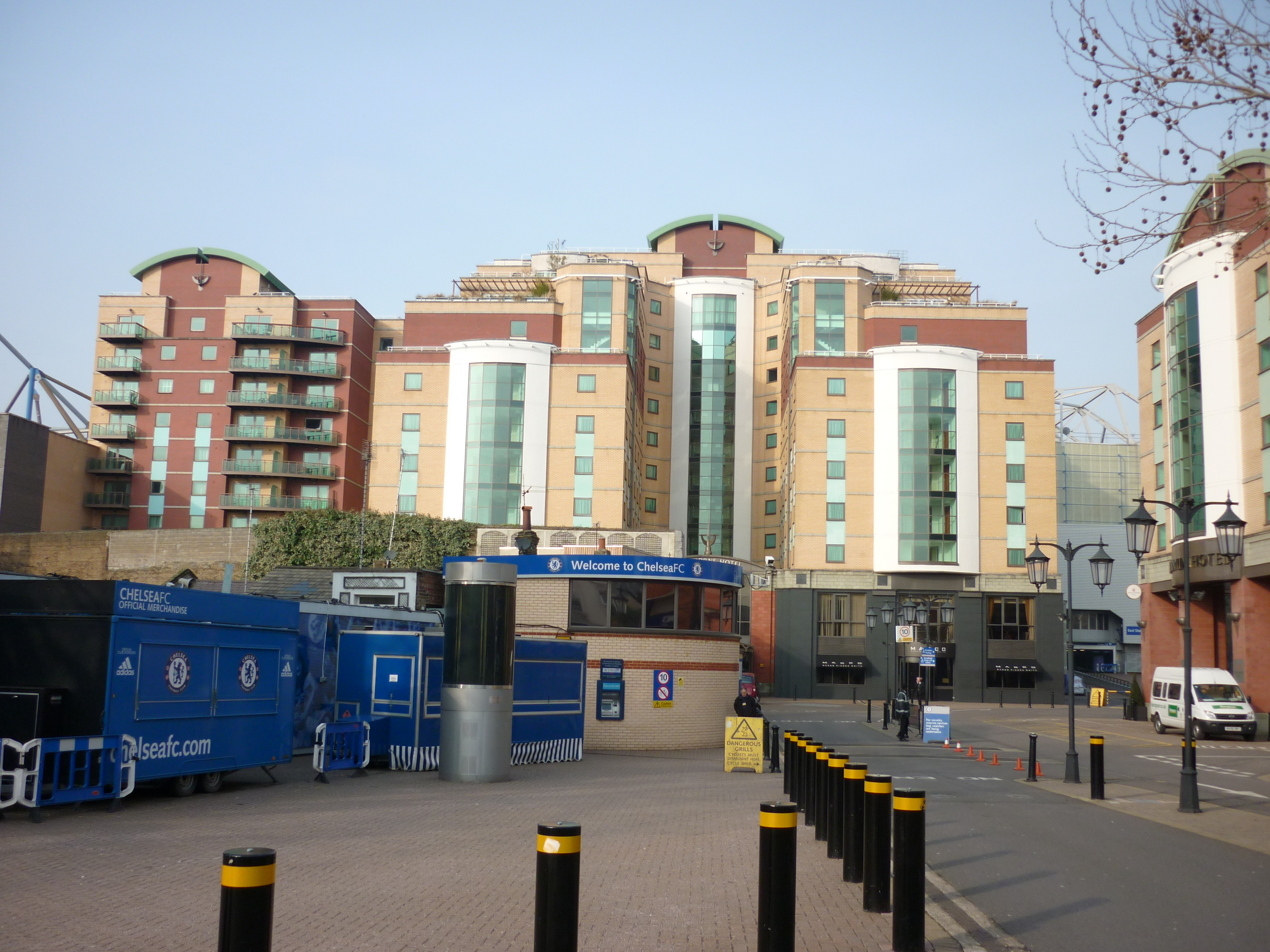
Stamford Bridge East Entrance

When Stamford Bridge was redeveloped in the Ken Bates era, many additional features were added to the complex, including two hotels, apartments, bars, restaurants, the Chelsea Megastore, and an interactive visitor attraction called Chelsea World of Sport. These were completed in August 2001 at a cost of £100 million. The intention was that these facilities would provide extra revenue to support the football side of the business, but they were less successful than hoped, and before the Abramovich takeover in 2003, the debt taken on to finance them was a major burden on the club. Soon after the takeover, a decision was taken to drop the "Chelsea Village" brand and refocus on Chelsea as a football club. However, the stadium is sometimes still referred to as part of Chelsea Village or "The Village".

=== Centenary Museum ===
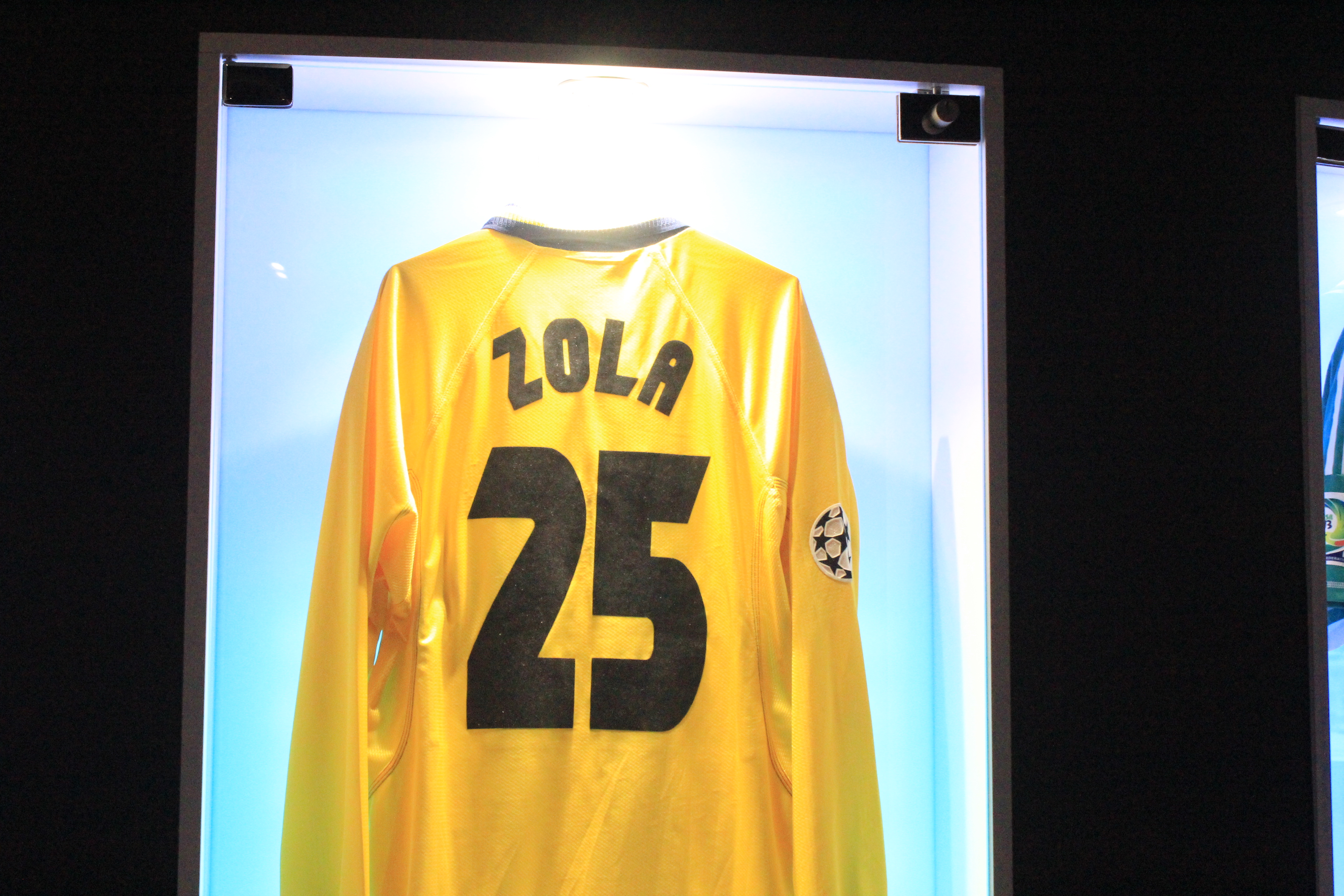
Gianfranco Zola's jersey hangs up at Chelsea's museum

2005 saw the opening of a new club museum, known as the Chelsea Museum or the Centenary Museum, to mark the one hundredth anniversary of the club. The museum is located in the former Shed Galleria. Visitors are able to visit the WAGs lounge and then watch an introductory video message from the former vice-president Richard Attenborough. They are then guided decade by decade through the club's history seeing old programmes, past shirts, José Mourinho's coat and other memorabilia. A motto on the wall of the museum reads "I am not from the bottle. I am a special one.", a reference to Mourinho's famous quote upon signing as manager for Chelsea.

On 6 June 2011, a new museum with improved and interactive exhibits opened behind the Matthew Harding stand. It is the largest football museum in London.

=== Megastore ===
The club merchandise shop, known as the Megastore, is situated on the south-west corner of the stadium. The shop has two floors; the ground floor mainly consists of souvenirs and children's gear, and the first floor offers mainly apparel, including training jerseys, jackets, coats, and replica team jerseys. There are also two smaller shops, one located at the Stamford Gate entrance and the other inside the new museum building behind the Matthew Harding stand.

== The Stamford Bridge Redevelopment Project ==
Former Chelsea owner Roman Abramovich sanctioned redevelopment of Stamford Bridge to around 55,000 to 60,000 seats. Its location in a heavily built-up part of Inner London, in between a main road and two railway lines complicates the logistics of the redevelopment. Additionally, dispersing 60,000 fans into the residential roads surrounding Stamford Bridge is likely to create congestion.

=== Alternative sites ===
Earls Court Exhibition Centre, White City, Battersea Power Station, the Imperial Road Gasworks (off the Kings Road on the Fulham and Chelsea border), and the Chelsea Barracks were alternative sites explored for a stadium rebuild. Under the Chelsea Pitch Owners (CPO) articles of association, the club would however relinquish the name 'Chelsea Football Club' should it ever move from the site where Stamford Bridge exists. The club proposed to buy back the freehold from CPO. In a vote held on 27 October 2011, its shareholders opted against selling their rights.

On 4 May 2012, Chelsea announced a bid to purchase Battersea Power Station to build a 60,000-seater stadium on the site in conjunction with property developers Almacantar. However the bid was not accepted, and the Battersea Power Station site was redeveloped for residential and commercial uses.

=== Proposed plan ===
Stamford Bridge as re-designed by the architect firm Herzog & de Meuron (2015)

On 17 June 2014, the club announced that it had commissioned a study of the area from Fulham Broadway to Stamford Bridge and beyond, by architects Lifschutz Davidson Sandilands. In December 2015, Chelsea announced intention to build a 60,000-seater stadium at Stamford Bridge.

On 5 January 2017, Hammersmith and Fulham council approved the rebuild. The whole of the Chelsea Village development would be demolished and the new stadium would include a new club shop, museum, a bar, and restaurants. The two existing hotels, restaurants, bars and spa would be relocated.

On 6 March 2017, full permission was given to redevelop Stamford Bridge by the mayor of London, Sadiq Khan, who said the "high quality and spectacular design" would add to the capital's "fantastic array of sporting arenas".

The Stamford Redevelopment Project encompasses an area of around 12.1 acres (48967 m^{2}). The northern boundaries are formed by Railway lines to the north and the east, while Fulham Road forms the southern boundary. Sir Oswald Stoll Mansions form the western frontier. The club carried out a public consultation in June 2017 to gain feedback about the stadium design. The project is expected to be constructed in a phased manner.

During the rebuild, expected to last 3–4 years, the club would have to find an alternative site to play home games. The Twickenham Stadium emerged as one possible destination, although the RFU stated they have no intentions of bringing football to the stadium. In February 2016, media reports claimed that Chelsea had agreed a £20 million deal with the FA for Wembley Stadium to use it for three seasons beginning in 2017–18. Although, Chelsea wanted exclusive rights to Wembley, the FA suggested that they share stadium with London-rivals Tottenham Hotspur F.C. for just the 2017–18 season, as Spurs were then engaged in their own stadium rebuild. The FA wanted to show no favourites in using the national stadium.

==== Proposed design ====
The stadium rebuild was designed by Swiss architects Herzog & de Meuron, who had previously designed the Allianz Arena in Munich and the Beijing National Stadium.

The Gothic, Westminster Abbey-inspired redesign, envisioned as a "cathedral of football", prominently features a series of 132 brick piers interlaced with 132 slender steel piers, in reference to the borough's Victorian-era brick works, that extend over the roof and end in a circular white steel ring right above the pitch. The piers create a covered walkway around the perimeter of the premises.

The unusual faceted polygon shape of the stadium accommodates site constraints such as neighbouring properties, rights to light, rails, historic boundary walls, whilst maximising its interior space. With five levels above ground and three basement levels, and five general admission entrances and four hospitality entrances to a three-tiered spacious spectator bowl across four stands, the rebuild's principal emphasis is on match-day atmosphere and spectator experience; including views of the pitch from all seats in the stadium, easier stadium access, and the season-ticket holders keeping their respective seating positions. A pair of continuous 'inner' and 'outer' rings occupying approximately 60,000 m^{2} around the bowl houses concourse facilities like dining areas, kiosks, washrooms, kitchens, and first-aid rooms. The façade, made up of 264 piers, is left open or is covered with opaque panels and translucent glass. The front panels feature decorative architectural metal known as Crozier. The public plazas are augmented by an additional 23,000 m^{2} through covering of the railway lines bordering its perimeter. According to the architects, the design is intended to "capture the spirit of the local heritage in a contemporary sculpted form that will respond to the local townscape [...] The structure will have a lightness of expression when viewed directly but also a solidity and textural materiality when seen obliquely".

Involving excavation activities and demolition of the existing stadium and the associated buildings, the rebuild, touted as "one of the most ambitious and difficult builds in architectural history", is expected to cost $754 million. Herzog & de Meuron, redesigned the stadium based on the master-plan drafted by Lifschutz Davidson Sandilands, while Aecom provided environmental, fire, mechanical, electrical, and plumbing engineering and were also landscape architects. Parsons Brinckerhoff and Schlaich Bergermann Partner worked on its structural and civil engineering aspects.

==== Legal hurdles ====
In May 2017, the Crosthwaites family, whose house is sited opposite the East Stand, launched legal proceedings in the form of an injunction, in order to prevent Chelsea from expanding Stamford Bridge. The family's argument was that further building at the stadium would block out their natural light. Chelsea attempted to offer them legal advice worth £50,000, and further compensation understood to be in the region of a six-figure sum, in exchange for waiving their legal right to light in their home. The club then sought the help of the local authority, Hammersmith & Fulham Council, in order to continue with the Stamford Bridge Redevelopment Project. In January 2018 the council sided with the club, by planning to use its powers under planning law to buy the air rights over part of Stamford Bridge and the railway line which sits between the stadium and the affected homes. It would then lease the land back to Chelsea and railway operators Network Rail, meaning the Crosthwaites would be entitled to compensation but would not be able to prevent the redevelopment.

=== Suspension ===
On 31 May 2018, the club announced suspension of the rebuild stating, "Chelsea Football Club announces today that it has put its new stadium project on hold. No further pre-construction design and planning work will occur. [...] The club does not have a time frame set for reconsideration of its decision. The decision was made due to the current unfavourable investment climate."

=== New plan ===
In July 2022, it was reported that the club's new owner Todd Boehly had appointed American architect Janet Marie Smith to oversee the renovation of the stadium. In July 2023, it was reported that Chelsea had agreed a deal to buy the majority of the 1.2 acre Sir Oswald Stoll Mansions site between Stamford Bridge and Fulham Broadway tube station for the stadium redevelopment.

== Statistics ==
=== Records ===
- Record attendance: 82,905 v Arsenal F.C. on 12 October 1935
- Lowest attendance: 3,000 V Lincoln City, Second Division, 17 February 1906 (During COVID: 2,000 v Leeds United, Premier League, 5 December 2020)

=== Average attendances ===
Average Premier League attendances
Season	Stadium capacity	Average attendance	% of capacity	Ranking within the Premier League
2025–26	40,044	39,602	98.9%	11th highest
2024–25	40,173	39,672	98.8%	9th highest
2023–24	40,343	39,700	98.4%	9th highest
2022–23	40,343	40,002	99.2%	9th highest
2021–22	40,343	36,424	90.3%	10th highest
2020–21	41,798	526	1.3%	5th highest
2019–20	41,798	32,023	76.6%	8th highest
2018–19	40,853	40,721	99.7%	8th highest
2017–18	41,631	41,282	99.2%	8th highest
2016–17	41,623	41,508	99.7%	6th highest
2015–16	41,798	41,500	99.2%	7th highest
2014–15	41,798	41,546	99.4%	7th highest
2013–14	41,798	41,482	99.3%	6th highest
2012–13	41,798	41,462	99.2%	6th highest
2011–12	42,449	41.478	97.7%	6th highest
2010–11	42,449	41,435	97.6%	6th highest

== Access ==
Stamford Bridge is easily accessible by public transport. The closest London Underground station – Fulham Broadway – has a dedicated "match day" entrance, allowing crowds easier entry/exit from the station, avoiding the main ticket hall and shopping centre. Given the stadium's location in south west London, car parking in the local area is extremely limited – and therefore the use of public transport is recommended by Chelsea FC and local supporter groups.

Public transport access
Service	Station/Stop	Line/Route	Walking distance from Stamford Bridge
London Buses	Walham Green	11, 14, 211, N11	200 yards (180 m) 2 mins
London Buses	Fulham Broadway/ Fulham Town Hall	28, 295, 306, 424, N28	0.2 miles (0.32 km) 5 mins
London Underground	Fulham Broadway	District line	0.2 miles (0.32 km) 5 mins
London Underground	Earl's Court	District line Piccadilly line	1.1 miles (1.8 km) 27 mins
National Rail; London Overground	West Brompton	London Overground Southern	0.8 miles (1.3 km) 20 mins
National Rail; London Overground	Imperial Wharf	London Overground Southern	0.625 miles (1.006 km) 13 mins
London River Services	Chelsea Harbour Pier	London River Services	0.75 miles (1.21 km) 15 mins

== See also ==
- Football in London
- Lists of stadiums

Preceded by Old Trafford; Manchester	FA Cup; Final venue 1920–1922	Succeeded by Wembley Stadium; London
Preceded by Olympiastadion; Munich	UEFA Women's Champions League; Final venue 2013	Succeeded by Estádio do Restelo; Lisbon
