= Batsakis v. Demotsis =

1949 Texas appeals court case

- Court: Texas Court of Appeals
- Decided: November 16, 1949
- Citation: 226 S.W.2d 673 (Tex. Civ. App. 1949)

Court membership
- Judge sitting: McGill

Batsakis v. Demotsis, 226 S.W.2d 673 (Tex. Civ. App. 1949), was a 1949 decision by the Texas Court of Appeals, United States which was an appeal from a judgment of the 57th judicial District Court of Bexar County, Texas. In the case, George Batsakis (Plaintiff) sued Eugenia Demotsis (Defendant) to collect on a promise Demotsis had made, in 1942 in war-torn Greece, to pay at a later date to Batsakis $2,000 dollars with interest at the rate of 8% per annum from April 2, 1942, in exchange for 500,000 drachmae given at the time of the execution of the contract. On appeal, the court found for Batsakis.

== Facts and case history ==
In 1942, during the occupation of Greece by Nazi Germany in World War II, Demotsis was in severe financial straits. This period in Greek history was marked by extensive starvation and malnutrition. Hundreds of thousands of Greeks died as a result of wartime living conditions. According to scholars, the apparent contract made between the two parties would most likely have resulted in punishment or even death at the hands of the German occupiers as a black market transaction.

Demotsis asked Batsakis for money, which she needed to buy food for her family. In exchange, Demotsis promised in writing (in the form of a letter) to give Batsakis $2,000 dollars, plus 8% annual interest, after the war, or sooner, if she was able to regain access to her assets in the United States (Demotsis held property and funds in Texas but had no direct access to them as a result of the war). In the putative letter from Demotsis to Batsakis, written in the Greek language, Demotsis stated that she had received $2,000 from Batsakis. The following is an English translation of the letter:

Piraeus - April 2, 1942

Mr. George Batsakis

Konstantinou Diadohou #7

Piraeus

Mr. Batsakis:

I state by my present (letter) that I received today from you the amount of two thousand dollars ($2,000.00) of United States of America money, which I borrowed from you for the support of my family during these difficult days and because it is impossible for me to transfer dollars of my own from America.

The above amount I accept with the expressed promise that I will return to you again in American dollars either at the end of the present war or even before in the event you might be able to find a way to collect them (dollars) from my representative in America whom I will write and give him an order relative to this. You understand until the final execution (payment) to the above amount an eight per cent interest will be added and paid together with the principal.

I thank you and I remain yours with respects.

The recipient,

(Signed) Eugenia The. Demotsis.

What she actually received however was 500,000 Greek drachmae, which had a market exchange value of approximately $25 at the time of the execution of the contract on account of massive hyperinflation. After Demotsis refused to repay the loan once the war was over, Batsakis sued and Demotsis asserted as her defense that the contract was unenforceable due to a lack of consideration (the element of exchange generally necessary to make a contract valid in common law systems) and that Batsakis's delivery of 500,000 drachmae, with a putative value of $25, could not be adequate consideration for her promise of $2,000, making the contract unenforceable. The trial court declared the contract enforceable and awarded Batsakis $750 plus interest and Batsakis appealed the judgment at which time the Court of Appeals affirmed the trial court's decision but modified the damages to $2,000 "with interest thereon at the rate of 8% per annum from April 2, 1942 and ordered that such judgment will bear interest at the rate of 8% per annum until paid on $2,000.00 thereof and on the balance interest at the rate of 6% per annum." The Court of Appeals reasoned that the consideration given by Demotsis for Batsakis's promise of 500,000 drachmae could not be considered inadequate under state law as she had received "exactly what she contracted for." The appellate court found the consideration legally sufficient and went on to state that the adequacy or inadequacy of the consideration did not bear on the enforceability, since mere inadequacy of consideration will not void a contract. The appellate court noted that, in common law systems including the American system, courts generally review the legal sufficiency of the consideration in a contract but have historically refused ordinarily to inquire into the adequacy of the consideration, whether the transaction was generally a fair or equivalent exchange.

== See also ==
- Chappell & Co Ltd v Nestle Co Ltd [1960] AC 87, an equivalent case confirming the rule in English contract law
- Evans v Llewellin (1787) 1 Cox CC 333, where a man's share in his sister's estate was sold for very little without advice or reflection, the transaction was set aside.
