= Edward Alderson (judge) =

English lawyer and judge

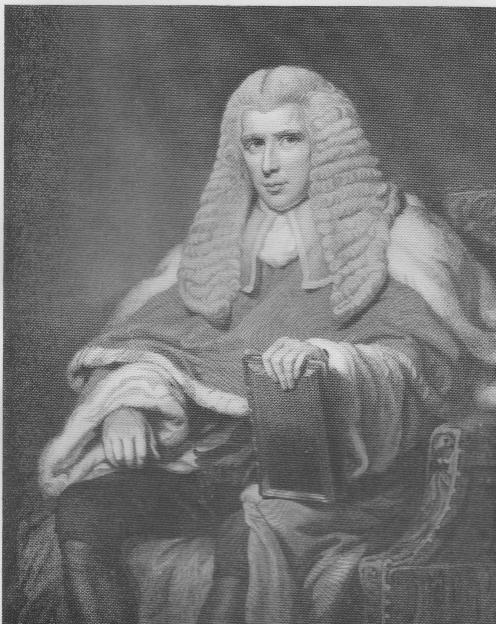
Baron Alderson

Sir Edward Hall Alderson (baptised 11 September 1787 – 27 January 1857) was an English lawyer and judge whose many judgments on commercial law helped to shape the emerging British capitalism of the Victorian era.

He was a Baron of the Exchequer and so held the honorary title Baron Alderson, in print Alderson, B.

== Early life ==
Born in Great Yarmouth, Alderson was the eldest son of Robert (died 1833), a barrister and recorder, and Elizabeth née Hurry who died in 1791. Alderson suffered an unstable childhood, variously living with relatives, unhappily attending Charterhouse School but, more positively, being tutored by Edward Maltby. He was an able student of mathematics and classics at Gonville and Caius College, Cambridge, about to take exams he heard of the death of his sister Isabella. A year later in 1809 he graduated as senior wrangler, First Smith's prize, was First Medallist, and Chancellor's Gold Medallist. During free time he became an ardent debater and avid reader; winning Middle Bachelors, and the Latin Prize for Comparison of Ancient Dialogues with Modern. In his finals year he also won the Members Prize, and Senior Bachelors Prize. He was consequently elected fellow.

A pupil of Joseph Chitty, Alderson was called to the bar in 1811 at the Inner Temple and began work on the northern circuit where he established a substantial practice. He joined with Richard Barnewall as a law reporter from 1817 to 1822. On 26 October 1823 he married Georgina Drewe (died 1871) and the couple had many children.

An early indication of his abilities came in 1825 when he was instructed by opponents of the proposed Liverpool and Manchester Railway, principally the directors of the Bridgewater and Leeds and Liverpool Canals, as their counsel in the committee stage of the private bill needed to establish the railway. Alderson was to cross-examine George Stephenson on his designs for the railway and the surveys on which they were based. Alderson proved an able advocate and Stephenson a poor witness. Stephenson later confessed, "I was not long in the witness box before I began to wish for a hole to creep out at." Largely owing to Alderson's devastating closing speech, the bill was lost, the railway was delayed for several years and Stephenson's early reputation badly damaged.

== Judicial career ==
Alderson was appointed to the Common Law Commission in 1828 and a judge of the Court of Common Pleas in 1830, with the attendant knighthood. He became a Baron of the Exchequer in the Exchequer of Pleas in 1834. He was an advocate of the plasticity of the common law in adapting to the changing times. According to Hedley, he was popular and jocular, a "clever, analytical, and forthright judge, with little patience for those of lesser abilities". He never sought to be a Queen's Counsel or Member of Parliament.

== Personality and family ==
Although as a criminal judge at the assizes he was instrumental in suppressing the Luddites and Chartists, he believed that rehabilitation was the principal goal of sentencing. He was dubious of the effects of deterrence and argued for the limitation of capital punishment, himself seeking to disapply it, by whatever technical means he could creatively devise.

An active member of the Church of England and a close friend of Bishop of London, Charles James Blomfield, Alderson supported the Gorham judgment which held that the Church was subject to secular law. He was a noted advocate of affirmation as an alternative to the oath for witnesses but opposed the growing contemporary campaign for secular education. Hedley describes Alderson as a "Conservative... suspicious of the 'tyranny' he saw in democracy".

Alderson established homes in London and Lowestoft where he wrote poetry, in English and Latin, and corresponded with his cousin, novelist Amelia Opie. He was also an enthusiastic and knowledgeable follower of horse racing.

While sitting at Liverpool assizes in December 1856, he heard of a serious injury to one of his sons and collapsed. He died the following January at his London home from a brain disease. He was buried at St Mary Magdalen's Church, Risby, near Bury St Edmunds.

His eldest son Edward Pakenham Alderson married Mildred Anne, (1827–1909), daughter of Sir William Cradock-Hartopp, 3rd Baronet and widow of Sir Francis Scott, 3rd Baronet, on 12 September 1868; he died on 3 December 1876.

Alderson's daughter, Georgina, married British statesman, Robert Gascoyne-Cecil, 3rd Marquess of Salisbury in 1857. Salisbury's father, James Gascoyne-Cecil, 2nd Marquess of Salisbury, opposed the marriage owing to Georgina's lack of wealth and social standing.

His grandson, Edward Alderson, a son of Francis John Alderson and Jane Irvin Black, served as Clerk to the Parliaments between 1930 and 1934.

== Cases ==
- Miller v. Salomons - oath of abjuration
- R v Pritchard (1836) 7 C. & P. 303 continues to be used in modern criminal cases in England and Wales as having laid down the criteria for assessing a defendant's fitness to plead.
- Hodge’s Case (1838), 2 Lewin 227, 168 E.R. 1136 - an explanation to the jury of the meaning and dangers of circumstantial evidence, required to be given as a separate direction to the jury until 1973.
- Winterbottom v. Wright (1842) – Reasserted the traditional doctrine of privity of contract to dismiss a negligence claim for damages by a pedestrian who was injured by a defective vehicle.
- Wood v Peel (1844) – in a trial to determine the winner of the Derby, Alderson ordered that the purported winner Running Rein be produced in court. The horse could not be found and the result of the race was overturned.
- R v. Serva and others
- R v. Griffin (1853) – Alderson suggested, contrary to precedent but obiter dicta, that the principle of priest-penitent privilege applied in England.
- Neilson v Harford (1841) – Distinguished patenting a principle (impermissible) from patenting a physical implementation of a principle (permissible)
- White v Bluett
- Knight (Clerk) v. The Marquess of Waterford
- Hadley v Baxendale (1854) – Defined the scope of contractual damages in English law.
- Blyth v Company Proprietors of the Birmingham Water Works (1856) – Introduced the concept of the reasonable person in setting judicial standards for the appropriate level of care owed to another.

== Bibliography ==
- [Anon.] (1857) Law Times 31 Jan, p.255; 7 Feb, p.266
- Alderson, C. H. (1858). Selections From the Charges and Other Detached Papers of Baron Alderson. With an Introductory Notice of His Life. London: John W. Parker & Son.
- Foulkes, N. (2010). Gentlemen and Blackguards: Gambling Mania and Plot to Steal the Derby of 1844. London: Weidenfeld & Nicolson. p. Ch.17–19.
- Hedley, S. (2004) "Alderson, Sir Edward Hall (bap. 1787, d. 1857)", Oxford Dictionary of National Biography, Oxford University Press, accessed 22 July 2007 (subscription, Wikipedia Library access or UK public library membership required)
