= White v Bluett =

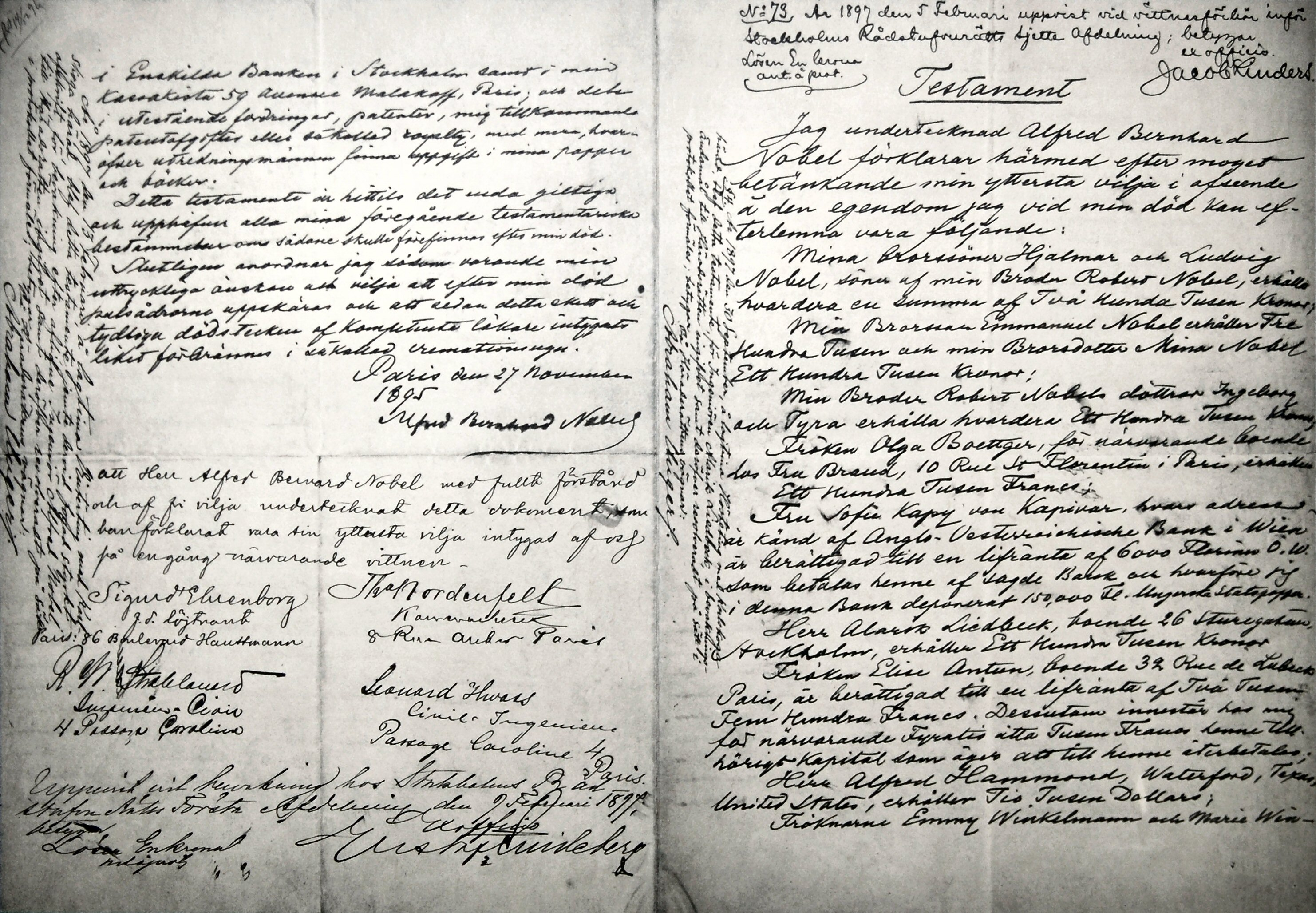
- Court: Exchequer Chamber
- Citation: (1853) 23 LJ Ex 36; 24 Eng Law & Eq 434

Court membership
- Judges sitting: Pollock CB, Alderson B

White v Bluett (1853) 23 LJ Ex 36 is an English contract law case, concerning the scope of consideration in English law.

== Facts ==
Mr Bluett had lent his son some money. Mr Bluett died. The executor of Mr Bluett's estate was Mr White. He sued the son to pay back the money. In his defense, the son argued that his father had said the son need not repay if the son would stop complaining about how Mr Bluett would distribute his property in his will among the children.

== Judgment ==
Pollock CB held there was no consideration for any discharge of the obligation to repay. The son had ‘no right to complain’ anyway. Not complaining was therefore an entirely intangible benefit.

The plea is clearly bad. By the argument, a principle is pressed to an absurdity, as a bubble is blown until it bursts. Looking at the words merely, there is some foundation for the argument, and following the words only, the conclusion may be arrived at. It is said, the son had a right to an equal distribution of his father's property, and did complain to his father because he had not an equal share, and said to him, I will cease to complain if you will not sue upon this note. Whereupon the father said, If you will promise me not to complain, I will give up the note. If such a plea as this could be supported, the following would be a binding promise: A man might complain that another person used the public highway more than he ought to do, and that other might say, do not complain, and I will give you five pounds. It is ridiculous to suppose that such promises could be binding. So, if the holder of a bill of exchange were suing the acceptor, and the acceptor were to complain that the holder had treated him hardly, or that the bill ought never to have been circulated, and the holder were to say, now, if you will not make any more complaints, I will not sue you, such a promise would be like that now set up. In reality, there was no consideration whatever. The son had no right to complain, for the father might make what distribution of his property he liked; and the son's abstaining from doing what he had no right to do can be no consideration.

Baron Alderson added this:

There is a consideration on one side, and it is said the consideration on the other is the agreement itself; if that were so, there could never be a nudum pactum.

== See also ==
- Bret v JS (1600) Cro Eliz 756
- Hamer v Sidway (1891) 27 NE 256
- Pitt v PHH Asset Management Ltd
- Williams v Roffey Bros
