= Ooregum Gold Mining Co of India v Roper =

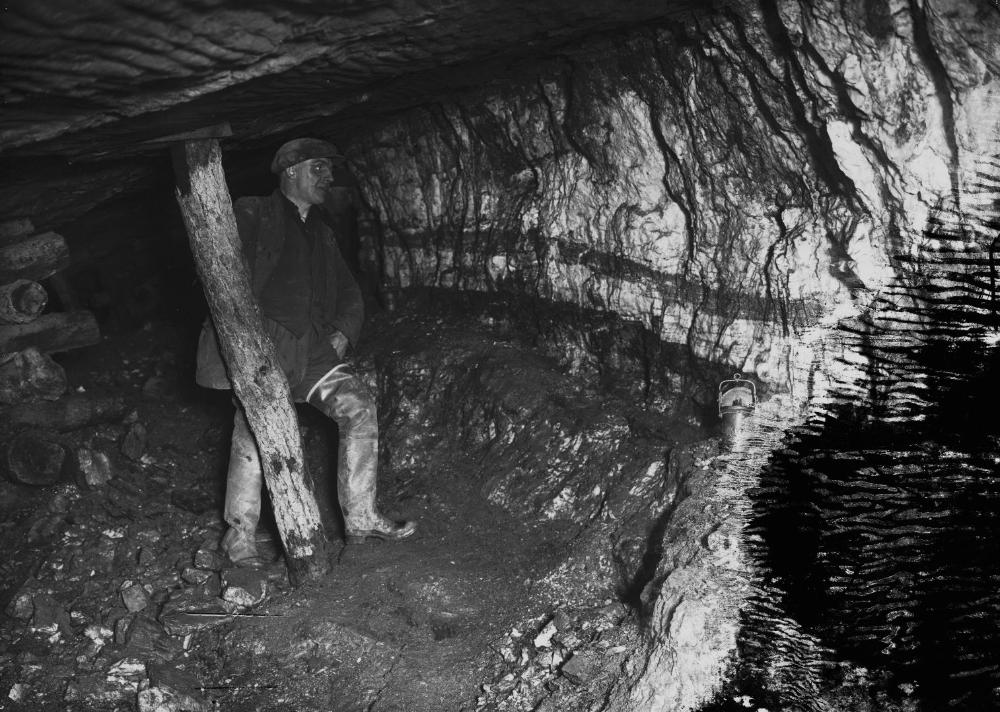
- Court: House of Lords
- Citation: [1892] AC 125

Keywords
- Share capital maintenance, issue at a discount

Ooregum Gold Mining Co of India v Roper [1892] AC 125 is an old and controversial English company law case concerning shares. It concerns the rule that shares should not be issued "at a discount" on the price at which they were issued.

Under United Kingdom company law the rule is now codified in Companies Act 2006, sections 552 and 580.

== Facts ==
The Ooregum Gold Mining Co of India issued 120,000 shares at £1 each. Shareholders said they wanted to sell on the shares for 5 shillings, (i.e. 25 new pence) one quarter of the value the shares were issued at, but that the buyers would be credited with a full £1 in the company. This would mean that shareholders would get a 15 shilling (75 new pence) discount. At the time of the litigation, the share price stood at £2 14s. The shareholders at the time of the purchase (who now wanted money to pay off a debenture) even though they had voted for the issue, then turned around to the buyers and argued that shares were prohibited from being issued at a discount, and that the transaction was void.

== Judgment ==
The House of Lords agreed that shares must not be issued at a discount. It was concerned with the potential effects on creditors. Although it is arguable that any capital increase would benefit creditors (hence speaking in favour of not preventing issue at a discount), the Lords held the proper technical route would be for the company to reduce the nominal value of the shares (as seen in the later case of Greenhalgh v Arderne Cinemas Ltd). Lord Halsbury LC said the following.

the Act of 1862... makes [it] one of the conditions of the limitation of liability that the memorandum shall contain the amount of the capital with which the company proposes to be registered, divided into shares of a certain fixed amount. It seems to me that the system thus created by which the shareholder’s liability is to be limited by the amount unpaid upon his shares, renders it impossible for the company to depart from that requirement, and by any expedient to arrange with their shareholders that they shall not be liable for the amount unpaid on their shares.

Lord Watson noted that otherwise, ‘so long as the company honestly regards the consideration as fairly representing the nominal value of the shares in cash, its estimate ought not to be critically examined.’

== See also ==
- UK company law
