= Bret v JS =

- Court: Court of Common Pleas
- Citation: (1600) Cro Eliz 756

Bret v JS & Wife (1600) Cro Eliz 756 is a formative English contract law, which held that a good consideration for courts to enforce contracts did not include promises for "natural affection".

== Facts ==
Mr William Dracot was the husband of the wife in this case. His son went to "table" (train as a servant for meal preparation) with Mr Bret for three years. Dracot promised Bret £8 a year for the duration, but he died that same year. The widow, out of love for the son and the wish that the son would continue, promised Bret £6 13s 4d for the tabling of the son for the rest of the three years, and £8 a year for each year after. Then the widow married the defendant, J.S. Mr Bret brought an action for the £6 13s 4d for tabling in the two years following.

The report shows the counsel for JS and the wife, Warburton, argued (1) this was an entire contract by the first husband for the entire year and it could not be apportioned (2) natural affection is not a sufficient ground for an assumpsit without quid pro quo (3) the contract should have been pleaded as an action for debt.

== Judgment ==
The Court held that the action succeeded. The report runs as follows,

For as to the first, it is well apportionable; because it being for tabling which he had taken, there ought to be a recompense, although he departed within the year, or that the contractor died within the year. To the second they agreed, that natural affection of itself is not a sufficient consideration to ground an assumpsit; for although it be sufficient to raise an use, yet it is not sufficient to ground an action without an express quid pro quo. But it is here good, because it is not only in consideration of affection, but that her son should afterwards continue at his table, which is good as well for the money due before, as for what should afterwards become due. And as to the third, true it is that, if the contract had been only for the tabling afterwards, then debt would have lain, and not this action; but in regard it is conjoined with another thing for which he could not have an action of debt (as it is here for this £6 13 s 4d) an action upon the case lies for all (as debt with other things may be put into an arbitrament). Wherefore it was adjudged for the plaintiff.

== See also ==
- Pillans v Van Mierop
- White v Bluett
- Combe v Combe
- Williams v Roffey Bros
