= Carefree =

Carefree may refer to:

- Carefree, Arizona, town in the United States
- Carefree (chant), a football chant sung by Chelsea FC supporters
- Carefree (feminine hygiene), a feminine hygiene product
- Carefree (film), a 1938 film with Fred Astaire and Ginger Rogers
- Carefree (Devon Williams album), 2008
- Carefree (Samantha Stollenwerck album), 2009
- "Carefree", a song by the Refreshments
- "Carefree", a 2014 song by Kevin MacLeod
- CareFree, a brand of chewing gum made by the Hershey Company
