= Back to the Shed campaign =

The "Back to the Shed Campaign" was launched by Chelsea FC in 2007, to improve the atmosphere at home matches.

The campaign was initially created by CFCnet's Jerry Kendik, in early 2007. The campaign aimed to introduce season ticket holders back to the Shed End at Stamford Bridge and try to restore the atmosphere to what it used to be.

The first match of the campaign was against Middlesbrough FC in February 2007 and an improvement in atmosphere was noticed. The major improvement was noticed against the Bolton Wanderers FC in April 2007, when a secondary campaign was launched by CFCnet called "The Shed 50", where 50 fans would sit in the Shed Upper together and sing throughout the majority of the match. The 50 target was not reached, but 42 was. Many noticed the vast improvements, and the campaigns continued into the 2007/08 season.

"Shed 100s", similar to the "Shed 50" but with 100 participants instead of 50, were organised for the home matches against Birmingham City FC, Blackburn Rovers FC, Manchester City FC and Newcastle United FC, during the autumn of 2007. A "Return to the 80s" campaign was also arranged by the people behind the "Return to the Shed Campaign", for the away game against Wigan Athletic FC, in November 2007. On 12 April 2008, was the next "Shed 100", against Wigan Athletic FC.

The Shed Campaign has also encouraged Shed End season ticket holders to gather in the south side of the East Upper Stand for the domestic cup matches, when the away team supporters take an allocation of 6,000 in The Shed End, displacing many season tickets holders. For the League Cup match against Liverpool in December 2007, this affected the atmosphere in a positive way, with Chelsea progressing to the final, winning 2–0.
