= Blue Tomorrow =

2000 single released by English football team Chelsea

"Blue Tomorrow" was a single released by the English football team Chelsea in 2000. It reached number 22 in the UK Singles Chart.
