= Carefree (chant) =

Football chant sung by followers of Chelsea football club

"Carefree" is a football chant sung by supporters of Chelsea Football Club, and it is meant to demonstrate indifference, valour and possibly belligerence when in an alien and hostile environment. The original tune is "Lord of the Dance”.

== Lyrics ==
It has its origins to a trip of Chelsea fans at an away game in Sweden in 1982. The lyrics were probably put together by a terrace regular named Mick Greenaway.

Carefree, wherever we may be
We are the famous CFC
And we don't care
Whoever you may be
'Cause we are the famous CFC

Usually, the chant is sung with bawdier lyrics.

== See also ==
- Blue Is the Colour (song)
- The Liquidator (instrumental)
