= Alyson Rudd =

British journalist with The Times (born 1967)

Alyson Rudd (born 1963) is a British journalist with The Times who writes about sport, mainly football, and literature in the book club section. She was born in Liverpool in 1967 and grew up in rural Lancashire. She is a graduate of the London School of Economics but began her career in fashion before becoming a financial journalist. She was an enthusiastic footballer with Leyton Orient Ladies and is now a qualified football coach and referee. She is a life long Liverpool fan, is married, has two sons and lives in West London.

== Bibliography ==
- Matthew Harding: Pursuing the Dream. Mainstream Publishing (16 Oct 1997) ISBN 1-85158-957-0 (biography of Matthew Harding}
- Astroturf Blonde. Headline Book Publishing; (5 Aug 1999) ISBN 0-7472-6093-1
