= Matthew Harding =

English businessman (1953–1996)

- Born: Matthew Charles Harding; 26 December 1953; Haywards Heath, Sussex, England
- Died: 22 October 1996 (aged 42); Middlewich, Cheshire, England
- Spouse: Ruth Harding
- Children: 3

Matthew Charles Harding (26 December 1953 – 22 October 1996) was a British businessman, vice-chairman of Chelsea Football Club and a financial supporter of New Labour.

== Early years and education ==
Harding was born in Haywards Heath, Sussex, the son of Paul Harding, an insurance executive. He attended Abingdon School in Abingdon from 1964 until 1971. He was a member of the badminton first team, for which he was awarded half-colours, in addition to being a cricket first XI player, captain of the Colts cricket team and a member of the hockey second XI. Although he enjoyed the sport, he did not enjoy the school ethos, earning his single A level in Latin.

== Career ==
Harding left school and went to London. Through his father's friendship with Ted Benfield, he joined the insurance brokers Benfield, Lovick & Rees and it was in the insurance industry that he made his fortune, starting out by making the tea and going on to be a director. By 1980, he had acquired a 32% stake in the company, becoming one of Britain's 100 richest men.

In June 1995, he was appointed a "Steward" of Abingdon School and presented the awards at Leavers' Day. He donated £500,000 towards the school's "Mercers Court", a new IT centre where one of the rooms was named ”The Matthew Harding Careers Room" after his interest in offering careers advice to the pupils.

=== Political activity ===
In 1996, Harding donated £1 million to the Labour Party, making him, at the time, the party's largest individual donor in its history.

=== Chelsea FC ===
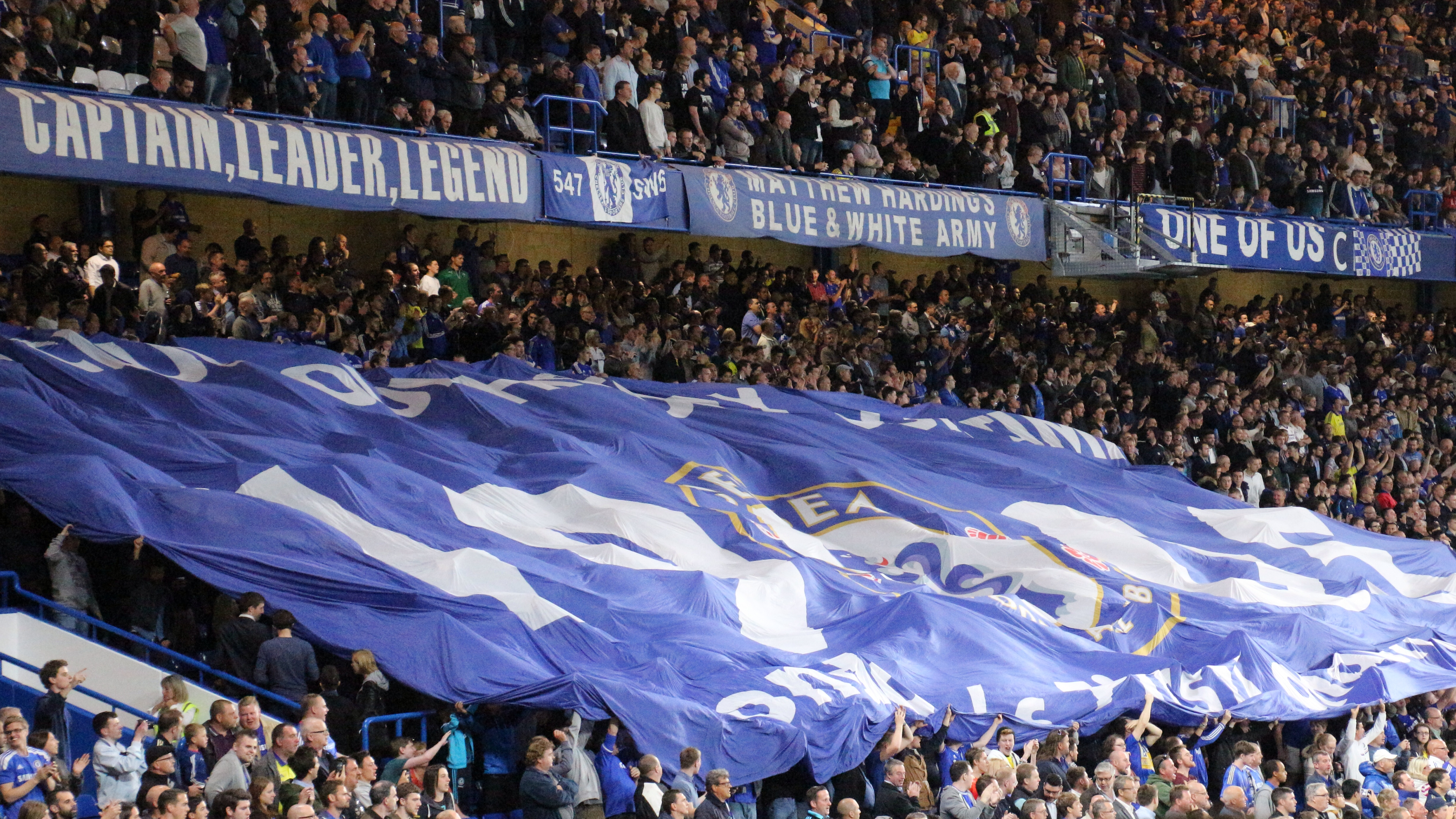
A banner at Stamford Bridge in 2014, in tribute to Harding. It reads "Matthew Harding's Blue & White Army".

A lifelong fan of Chelsea Football Club, Harding responded to Chelsea chairman Ken Bates' call for new investment in the club in 1993. In October 1993, he was appointed as a Chelsea Football Club director. He invested £26.5 million in the club, including £7.5 million towards construction of the North Stand (now the Matthew Harding Stand), £16.5 million to buy the Stamford Bridge freehold and transfer funds. He would frequently ask players for autographs and other signed items. However, his time there was marked by frequent clashes with Bates, club chairman and majority shareholder, over the direction to be taken by the club. Bates feared that Harding would try to oust him from his position, although in reality Harding was only interested in the success of the club. Bates eventually banned Harding from the Chelsea boardroom and effectively limited his input and influence over the club. Dispute between Bates and Harding was continual and only stopped after Harding's death in 1996. Bates received widespread criticism after calling Harding "evil" just a year after his death.

== Death ==
On 22 October 1996, while flying back from Chelsea’s League Cup defeat away to Bolton Wanderers, the helicopter Harding was travelling on crashed near Middlewich, Cheshire, killing Harding along with the pilot and three other passengers, including journalist John Bauldie. He was 42. The crash of the Eurocopter AS355 Écureuil 2 aircraft took place at night and in poor weather. An investigation by the Air Accidents Investigation Branch found that the pilot did not have the experience or qualifications necessary to safely pilot by instruments in such conditions. An inquest found that the pilot was likely to have become disorientated due to the poor visibility, and called for the introduction of new safety regulations. Harding's death came months before Chelsea’s FA Cup triumph and the general election victory of the Labour Party which he had backed financially near the end of his life.

== Personal life ==
Harding's son, Patrick, became a semi-professional footballer who played for Burgess Hill Town F.C.

== See also ==
- List of Old Abingdonians

== Sources ==
- Matthew Harding: Pursuing the Dream by Alyson Rudd Mainstream Publishing (16 October 1997) ISBN 1-85158-957-0
- A Question of Honour by Lord Michael Levy Simon & Schuster (12 May 2008) ISBN 1-84737-315-1
