= Mick Greenaway =

Influential football supporter

Mick Greenaway (1949–1999) was a famous football fan and die-hard supporter of Chelsea FC.

Raised in Billing Street, near Stamford Bridge, his adoptive father was a Chelsea fan, who introduced him to the club during the glorious 1954-55 season.

He was the creator of the Zigger Zagger chant, and would introduce it to other Chelsea fans to sing following him. He also created the chant 'Ask Old Brown To Tea' from a Chas & Dave song, which started the tradition of Chelsea fans throwing celery onto the pitch.
