= Carefree (Devon Williams album) =

Studio album by Devon Williams
- Released: April 29, 2008
- Genre: Indie
- Length: 45:52
- Label: Ba da bing (CD) / olFactory (vinyl)
- Producer: Mike Trujillo

Carefree is the first full-length album by Los Angeles based Devon Williams since disbanding Fingers Cut Megamachine.

== Track listing ==
1. "Please Be Patient" – 2:45
2. "Honey" – 2:07
3. "Elevator" – 3:18
4. "Fragile Weapon" – 2:30
5. "Stephane City" – 2:52
6. "One and One" – 2:43
7. "A Truce" – 3:26
8. "Jolie" – 2:48
9. "Bells" – 1:24
10. "How Could I Not" – 5:52
11. "A Day in the Night" – 4:57

== Notes/trivia ==
- The entire length of track 11, "A Day in the Night", is 16:03, and includes a secret track at 14:55.
- The album is titled Carefree on the front cover, and Careerfree on the spines.
- Track 9, "Bells", was previously titled "Slaughter House".
